= 2007–08 Feyenoord season =

Feyenoord
2007–08 season
- Chairman: Dick van Well
- Manager: Bert van Marwijk
- Stadium: De Kuip
- Eredivisie: 6th
- KNVB Cup: Winners
- Top goalscorer: League: Roy Makaay (13); All: Roy Makaay (20)
Home colours	Away colours

The 2007–08 season was the first and last season under coach Bert van Marwijk before becoming the head coach of the Netherlands national football team. This was his second spell at Feyenoord after he had managed the team from 2000 to 2004. This season was not the best of seasons in the Eredivisie finishing only 6th. However, the club won a big price: the KNVB Cup, which was the 11th time they had won the cup.

== Competitions ==
=== Overall ===
Competition	Started round	Final position / round	First match	Last match
Eredivisie	—	6th	19 August 2007	20 April 2008
KNVB Cup	—	Winner	29 September 2007	27 April 2008

Source: Competitions

=== Eredivisie ===
==== League table ====
Pos	Team	Pld	W	D	L	GF	GA	GD	Pts	Qualification or relegation
4	Twente	34	17	11	6	52	32	+20	62	Qualification to Champions League third qualifying round playoff
5	Heerenveen	34	18	6	10	88	48	+40	60	Qualification to Champions League third qualifying round playoff
6	Feyenoord	34	18	6	10	64	41	+23	60	Qualification to UEFA Cup first round
7	Groningen	34	15	6	13	53	54	−1	51	Qualification to UEFA Cup first round playoff
8	NEC	34	14	7	13	49	50	−1	49	Qualification to UEFA Cup first round playoff

Source: Eredivisie
Rules for classification: 1) points; 2) goal difference; 3) number of goals scored.

==== Results summary ====
Overall								Home						Away					
Pld	W	D	L	GF	GA	GD	Pts	W	D	L	GF	GA	GD	W	D	L	GF	GA	GD
34	18	6	10	81	49	+32	60	12	3	2	57	20	+37	6	3	8	24	29	−5

Source: Matches

==== Matches ====
19 August 2007 1	FC Utrecht	0 – 3	Feyenoord	Utrecht
14:30 CEST	George (yellow card) 3'	Report	Hofs (yellow card) 8', (goal) 62'; Bruins 25'; Van Bronckhorst (yellow card) 54'; Makaay 85'	Stadium: Stadion Galgenwaard; Attendance: 22,100; Referee: Eric Braamhaar

26 August 2007 2	Feyenoord	5 – 0	NAC	Rotterdam
14:30 CEST	Makaay 21' (pen.); Vlaar 49'; Şahin 55', 72'; De Guzmán 69'	Report	Loran (yellow card) 20'	Stadium: De Kuip; Attendance: 41,000; Referee: Jack van Hulten

1 September 2007 3	Feyenoord	2 – 0	Willem II	Rotterdam
20:00 CEST	Bruins 26'; Makaay 43'; Lucius (yellow card) 58'	Report	Nieuwendaal (yellow card) 88'	Stadium: De Kuip; Attendance: 45,000; Referee: Bas Nijhuis

16 September 2007 4	Roda JC	1 – 3	Feyenoord	Kerkrade
12:30 CEST	Tioté 40'; Hadouir (yellow card) 46'; Saeijs (yellow card) 59'; Sonkaya (yellow card) 80'	Report	Vlaar (yellow card) 38'; Makaay 47' (pen.); De Cler (yellow card) 53'; De Guzmán 62', 70'	Stadium: Parkstad Limburg; Attendance: 17,148; Referee: Ben Haverkort

23 September 2007 5	PSV	4 – 0	Feyenoord	Eindhoven
14:30 CEST	Culina (yellow card) 27'; Perez 35', 43'; Méndez 39', (yellow card) 58'; Koevermans 88'	Report	De Cler (yellow card) 25'; Lucius (yellow card) 28'; Van Bronckhorst (yellow card) 60'	Stadium: Philips Stadion; Attendance: 35,000; Referee: Eric Braamhaar

29 September 2007 6	Feyenoord	2 – 0	Heerenveen	Rotterdam
20:00 CEST	Makaay 22'; Hofs 28'	Report	Zuiverloon (yellow card) 52'; Dingsdag (yellow card) 58'; Nielsen (yellow card) 82'	Stadium: De Kuip; Attendance: 47,000; Referee: Pieter Vink

7 October 2007 7	Vitesse	0 – 1	Feyenoord	Arnhem
12:30 CEST	Yakubu (yellow card) 53'	Report	Hofs 55' (yellow card) 90'	Stadium: Gelredome; Attendance: 18,450; Referee: Luc Wouters (Belgium)

20 October 2007 8	Feyenoord	1 – 0	Excelsior	Rotterdam
20:00 CEST	Van Bronckhorst 77'	Report	Bandjar (yellow card) 32'; Altheer (yellow card) 84'	Stadium: De Kuip; Attendance: 47,000; Referee: Björn Kuipers

27 October 2007 9	Twente	2 – 0	Feyenoord	Enschede
20:00 CEST	Nkufo 11'; Huysegems 57', (yellow card) 58'	Report	De Guzmán (yellow card) 49'; Lee (yellow card) 74'	Stadium: Arke Stadion; Attendance: 13,250; Referee: Jack van Hulten

4 November 2007 10	Feyenoord	2 – 0	De Graafschap	Rotterdam
14:30 CEST	De Guzmán 54'; Makaay 59' (pen.)	Report		Stadium: De Kuip; Attendance: 46,000; Referee: Eric Braamhaar

11 November 2007 11	Feyenoord	2 – 2	Ajax	Rotterdam
12:30 CEST	Van Bronckhorst (yellow card) 11', (goal) 28'; Şahin (yellow card) 30'; De Guzmán (yellow card) 22', (goal) 74'	Report	Vertonghen (yellow card) 13'; Suárez (yellow card) 16'; Rommedahl 52'; S. de Jong 67'; Heitinga (yellow card) 77'; Maduro (yellow card) 82'	Stadium: De Kuip; Attendance: 42,500; Referee: Frank de Bleeckere (Belgium)

25 November 2007 12	FC Groningen	3 – 2	Feyenoord	Groningen
14:30 CEST	Levchenko (yellow card) 43'; Van de Laak (yellow card) 55'; Sankoh (yellow card) 65'; Berg 73', 90'; Nevland 76'	Report	Makaay 11'; Hofland (yellow card) 74'; Şahin 77'; De Cler (yellow card) 86'	Stadium: Euroborg; Attendance: 19,721; Referee: Pieter Vink

2 December 2007 13	Feyenoord	6 – 0	Heracles	Rotterdam
14:30 CEST	Makaay 1', 27'; Hofland 41'; Slory 67'; Van Bronckhorst 71'; Wijnaldum 74'; Lucius (yellow card) 87'	Report		Stadium: De Kuip; Attendance: 44,500; Referee: Dick van Egmond

9 December 2007 14	VVV-Venlo	0 – 0	Feyenoord	Venlo
12:30 CEST	Fleuren (yellow card) 25'	Report	Van Bronckhorst (yellow card) 40'; Şahin (yellow card) 46'; Bahia (yellow card) 58'	Stadium: De Koel; Attendance: 6,000; Referee: Kevin Blom

30 January 2008 15	Feyenoord	2 – 2	AZ	Rotterdam
20:45 CEST	Lucius (yellow card) 26'; Van Bronckhorst 50'; Bahia 75'	Report	De Zeeuw (yellow card) 28'; Pellè 40'; El Hamdaoui 72'; Dembélé (yellow card) 74'	Stadium: De Kuip; Attendance: 46,500; Referee: Kevin Blom

23 December 2007 16	NEC	0 – 2	Feyenoord	Nijmegen
12:30 CEST	Nalbantoğlu (yellow card) 49'	Report	De Guzmán 48', 60'	Stadium: De Goffert; Attendance: 12,500; Referee: Roelof Luinge

26 December 2007 17	Feyenoord	2 – 0	Sparta	Rotterdam
12:30 CEST	Makaay 4', 74'; Lucius (yellow card) 34'; Hofland (yellow card) 61'	Report	Rose (yellow card) 67'	Stadium: De Kuip; Attendance: 46,500; Referee: Pieter Vink

30 December 2007 18	Heerenveen	1 – 1	Feyenoord	Heerenveen
14:30 CEST	Beerens (yellow card) 23'; Sibon 88'	Report	Slory 17'; Lucius (yellow card) 24'	Stadium: Abe Lenstra Stadion; Attendance: 25,600; Referee: Dick Jol

12 January 2008 19	Feyenoord	0 – 1	PSV	Rotterdam
20:00 CEST	De Cler (yellow card) 60'; Hofs (yellow card) 63' (red card)	Report	Bakkal 40'; Dzsudzsák (yellow card) 65'; Afellay (yellow card) 90'	Stadium: De Kuip; Attendance: 45,000; Referee: Pieter Vink

18 January 2008 20	Excelsior	2 – 1	Feyenoord	Rotterdam
20:30 CEST	Van Guldener 5'; Den Ouden 11'; Braber (yellow card) 58'	Report	Mols (yellow card) 73'; Buijs 80'; Hofland (yellow card) 88'	Stadium: Stadion Woudestein; Attendance: 3,600; Referee: Eric Braamhaar

24 January 2008 21	Feyenoord	3 – 1	Twente	Rotterdam
20:00 CEST	Bruins 40'; Makaay 56'; De Cler 63'; Van Bronckhorst (yellow card) 90'	Report	Nkufo 22' (pen.); Engelaar (yellow card) 43'	Stadium: De Kuip; Attendance: 43,500; Referee: Dick van Egmond

27 January 2008 22	Feyenoord	1 – 1	Groningen	Rotterdam
14:30 CEST	Fledderus 47' (o.g.)	Report	Berg 32'	Stadium: De Kuip; Attendance: 41.500; Referee: Jol

3 February 2008 23	Ajax	3 – 0	Feyenoord	Amsterdam
12:30 CEST	Heitunga 8'; Lindgren (yellow card) 12'; Huntelaar 45', 90'; Luque (yellow card) 80'	Report	Hofland (yellow card) 23'; Slory (yellow card) 59'; Landzaat (yellow card) 76'	Stadium: Amsterdam Arena; Attendance: 49,893; Referee: Jach van Hulten

9 February 2008 24	De Graafschap	1 – 3	Feyenoord	Doetinchem
20:30 CEST	Schöne 18'; Hese (yellow card) 47'; Schuurman (yellow card) 53'; Bot (yellow card) 73'	Report	Makaay 45'; Hofs 56', 63'; Slory (yellow card) 90'	Stadium: De Vijverberg; Attendance: 12,600; Referee: Björn Kuipers

17 February 2008 25	Feyenoord	1 – 0	Vitesse	Rotterdam
14:30 CEST	Fer (yellow card) 13'; Greene (yellow card) 20'; De Guzmán 45'; Slory (yellow card) 73'; De Cler (yellow card) 90'	Report	Takak (yellow card) 31'; Jansen (yellow card) 58'; Sansoni (yellow card) 71'; Van der Schaaf (yellow card) 73'; Verhaegh (red card) 90'	Stadium: De Kuip; Attendance: 46,000; Referee: Reinold Wiedemeijer

23 February 2008 26	Heracles	3 – 3	Feyenoord	Almelo
20:00 CEST	Everton 1'; Lakić 23', 60'; Quansah (yellow card) 63'; Boakye (yellow card) 65'; García (yellow card) 89'; Schilder (yellow card) 90'	Report	Bahia 17'; Landzaat 31', (yellow card) 70'; Hofs 57', (yellow card) 65'; Greene (yellow card) 58'; Hofland (yellow card) 79'	Stadium: Polman Stadion; Attendance: 8.500; Referee: Blom

2 March 2008 27	Feyenoord	1 – 3	NEC	Rotterdam
14:30 CEST	Van Bronckhorst 39', (yellow card) 48'; De Cler (yellow card) 82'	Report	Holman 17'; Sibum (yellow card) 18'; Nalbantoğlu (yellow card) 45'; Babos (yellow card) 69'; Olsson 79'; Lens 90'	Stadium: De Kuip; Attendance: 44,000; Referee: Bas Nijhuis

12 March 2008 28	AZ	0 – 1	Feyenoord	Alkmaar
20:00 CEST	De Zeeuw (yellow card) 42'; Jaliens (red card) 90'	Report	De Guzmán 20'; De Cler (yellow card) 80'	Stadium: DSB Stadion; Attendance: 16,652; Referee: Luc Wouters (Belgium)

15 March 2008 29	Feyenoord	4 – 1	VVV-Venlo	Rotterdam
20:00 CEST	Bruins 5'; Van Bronckhorst 33'; Mols 44'; Şahin 58'	Report	Honda 13'; Ofrany (yellow card) 32'; Blondelle (yellow card) 79'	Stadium: De Kuip; Attendance: 46,000; Referee: Ben Haverkort

23 March 2008 30	Sparta	3 – 2	Feyenoord	Rotterdam
14:30 CEST	Boukhari 15', 50'; Promes (yellow card) 42'; Rutjes (yellow card) 85'; Emnes 90'	Report	Lucius 12'; Şahin (yellow card) 48'; Van Bronckhorst 62'; Fer (yellow card) 90'	Stadium: Het Kasteel; Attendance: 10,894; Referee: Dick Jol

30 March 2008 31	NAC	3 – 1	Feyenoord	Breda
12:30 CEST	Elshot 32'; Molhoek 40'; Amoah 72'; Fehér (yellow card) 79'	Report	Fer 10'; De Cler (yellow card) 70'	Stadium: Rat Verlegh Stadion; Attendance: 16,590; Referee: Eric Braamhaar

6 April 2008 32	Feyenoord	3 – 1	FC Utrecht	Rotterdam
14:30 CEST	Bruins 35'; Landzaat 38'; Van Bronckhorst (yellow card) 44'; Bahia (yellow card) 53'; Şahin 56'	Report	Van der Gun (yellow card) 32'; George 74'; Cornelisse (yellow card) 86'	Stadium: De Kuip; Attendance: 44,000; Referee: Roelof Luinge

13 April 2008 33	Willem II	3 – 1	Feyenoord	Tilburg
14:30 CEST	Demouge 7', 19'; Boutahar 36'	Report	Bruins (yellow card) 24'; Hofs (yellow card) 60'; Bahia 74'; Hofland (yellow card) 78'	Stadium: Koning Willem II Stadion; Attendance: 14,700; Referee: Dick van Egmond

20 April 2008 34	Feyenoord	3 – 0	Roda JC	Rotterdam
14:30 CEST	Bruins 55', (yellow card) 67'; Şahin 77'; Mols 88'	Report	Vandamme (yellow card) 29'; Meeuwis (yellow card) 36'; De Jong (red card) 65'	Stadium: De Kuip; Attendance: 46,000; Referee: Pieter Vink

=== KNVB Cup ===
26 September 2007 Round of 64	Feyenoord	3 – 0	FC Utrecht	Rotterdam
20:45 CEST	Hofs 53'; Bruins 56'; Makaay 61'	Report		Stadium: De Kuip; Attendance: 21,000; Referee: Roelof Luinge

1 November 2007 Round of 32	Feyenoord	3 – 1	Groningen	Rotterdam
20:45 CEST	Makaay 4', 29' (pen.), 39'; Buijs (yellow card); Van Bronckhorst (yellow card)	Report	Greene 62' (o.g.); Kruiswijk (yellow card); Meerdink (yellow card); Nevland (yellow card)	Stadium: De Kuip; Attendance: 30,000; Referee: Tom van Sighem

15 January 2008 Round of 16	SV Deurne	0 – 4	Feyenoord	Helmond
20:45 CEST		Report	De Guzmán 9'; Makaay 17', 62'; Mols 68'; Hofland (yellow card); Bahia (yellow card)	Stadium: De Braak; Attendance: 4,200; Referee: Michel Winter

28 February 2008 1/4 Final	Feyenoord	2 – 1	PEC Zwolle	Rotterdam
20:45 CEST	Makaay 8'; Mols 83'; Buijs (yellow card)	Report	Tozé 43'	Stadium: De Kuip; Attendance: 32,000; Referee: Dick van Egmond

18 March 2008 1/2 Final	Feyenoord	2 – 0	NAC	Rotterdam
20:45 CEST	Mols 53'; landzaat 74', (yellow card); Lucius (yellow card)	Report	Zwaanswijk (yellow card); Mtiliga (yellow card)	Stadium: De Kuip; Attendance: 29,000; Referee: Pieter Vink

27 April 2008 Final	Feyenoord	2 – 0	Roda JC	Rotterdam
18:00 CEST	landzaat 8', (yellow card); De Guzmán 36'; Lucius (yellow card)	Report	Meeuwis (yellow card); Janssen (yellow card); Tioté (yellow card)	Stadium: De Kuip; Attendance: 45,000; Referee: Jack van Hulten

=== Friendlies ===
11 July 2007	VV Lyra	0 – 8	Feyenoord	De Lier
			De Guzman 2', 4', 41'; Slory 19', 45'; Makaay 25', 34'; Bahia 77'	Stadium: Sportpark De Zweth; Attendance: unknown Referee: unknown

14 July 2007	RKSV Taxandria	0 – 12	Feyenoord	Oisterwijk
			Own goal 10' (o.g.); Lucius 25' (pen.); De Guzman 38', 41'; De Cler 45'; Slory 49'; Makaay 65'; Wijnaldum 69'; J. Buijs 80'; Castelen 85'; Mols 87'; Hofs 88'	Stadium: De Gemullehoeken; Attendance: unknown Referee: unknown

17 July 2007	VV Reünie	0 – 18	Feyenoord	Borculo
			Makaay 1', 11', 21', 28', 38'; J. Buijs 2' (pen.); Vincken 8', 25'; De Cler 31'; Castelen 34'; Wijnaldum 43'; Şahin 45'; Slory 53'; Lensky 66'; Mols 73'; Bruins 78'; Drenthe 78'; De Guzmán 88'	Stadium: De Wildbaan; Attendance: unknown Referee: unknown

20 July 2007	Voorschoten '97	0 – 9	Feyenoord	Voorschoten
			Own goal 10' (o.g.); Makaay 11' (pen.); Castelen 24', 55', 65'; Bruins 45'; D. Buijs 71'; Hofs 75', 79'	Stadium: Sportpark Adegeest; Attendance: unknown Referee: unknown

25 July 2007	Feyenoord	1 – 1	Chelsea	Rotterdam
18:00 CEST	Hofland 44'		Lampard 79'	Stadium: De Kuip; Attendance: 45,000; Referee: Ruud Bossen

28 July 2007	FC Emmen	2 – 3	Feyenoord	Emmen
	Stroeve (2x)		Makaay 4'; De Guzmán 25'; Mols 85'	Stadium: Unive Stadion; Attendance: 8,000; Referee: unknown

11 August 2007	RKSV Schijndel	0 – 5	Feyenoord	Schijndel
			Makaay 15'; Own goal 30' (o.g.); Bruins 40'; Hofs 59'; Bahia 87'	Stadium: Sportpark Zuideinderpark; Attendance: unknown Referee: unknown

8 May 2008	WSV Apeldoorn	1 – 4	Feyenoord	Apeldoorn
	Berghuis		Makaay 7', 74', 85'; Slory 57'; Landzaat (penalty missed)	Stadium: Sportpark De Voorwaarts; Attendance: unknown Referee: unknown

15 May 2008	Alphense Boys	2 – 7	Feyenoord	Alphen aan den Rijn
	Patrick Kalkema; Moustafa Yachhou		Van Bronckhorst 12', 47'; Mols 25', 40'; Slory 58'; Hofs 60', 90'	Stadium: Sportpark De Bijlen; Attendance: unknown Referee: unknown

22 May 2008	BSV Limburgia	0 – 11	Feyenoord	Brunssum
			Lucius 8' (pen.), 45'; Bahia 24'; Mols 30'; Wattamaleo 30', 58'; Hofs 36', 43', 69'; Tininho 37', 39'	Stadium: Sportpark Houserveld; Attendance: unknown Referee: unknown

24 May 2008	SV Meerssen	0 – 2	Feyenoord	Meerssen
			Greene 50'; Hofs 55'	Stadium: Sportpark Marsana; Attendance: unknown Referee: unknown

28 May 2008	ASWH	1 – 5	Feyenoord	Hendrik-Ido-Ambacht
	Ferry van Lare		Pattinama 7'; Buijs 13'; Bahia 74'; Tininho 80'; Landzaat 82' (pen.)	Stadium: Sportpark Schildman; Attendance: unknown Referee: unknown

=== Port of Rotterdam Tournament 2007 ===
3 August 2007	Feyenoord	0 – 0	Porto (Portugal)	Rotterdam
				Stadium: De Kuip; Attendance: unknown Referee: unknown

5 August 2007	Feyenoord	1 – 1	Liverpool (England)	Rotterdam
	Drenthe 44'; Bruins (penalty missed) 86'		Gerrard 71'	Stadium: De Kuip; Attendance: unknown Referee: unknown

== Player details ==
No.	Pos	Nat	Player	Total		Eredivisie		KNVB Cup	
No.	Pos	Nat	Player	Apps	Goals	Apps	Goals	Apps	Goals
3	DF	(Netherlands) NED	Kevin Hofland	31	1	27	1	4	0
4	DF	(Brazil) BRA	André Bahia	33	3	28	3	5	0
5	DF	(Netherlands) NED	Tim de Cler	38	1	32	1	6	0
6	DF	(Netherlands) NED	Theo Lucius	34	1	29	1	5	0
7	MF	(Netherlands) NED	Danny Buijs	24	1	20	1	4	0
8	MF	(Netherlands) NED	Giovanni van Bronckhorst	38	6	32	6	6	0
9	FW	(Netherlands) NED	Roy Makaay	32	20	28	13	4	7
10	MF	(Netherlands) NED	Nicky Hofs	24	7	21	6	3	1
11	FW	(Netherlands) NED	Andwélé Slory	15	2	14	2	1	0
14	FW	(Netherlands) NED	Michael Mols	27	5	21	2	6	3
16	FW	(South Korea) KOR	Lee Chun-soo	14	0	12	0	2	0
17	MF	(Turkey) TUR	Nuri Şahin	33	6	28	6	5	0
18	DF	(Netherlands) NED	Serginho Greene	28	0	22	0	6	0
19	MF	(Netherlands) NED	Denny Landzaat	14	4	11	2	3	2
20	DF	(Netherlands) NED	Ron Vlaar	4	1	4	1	0	0
21	DF	(Netherlands) NED	Dwight Tiendalli	0	0	0	0	0	0
22	FW	(Netherlands) NED	Luigi Bruins	33	7	27	6	6	1
23	DF	(Netherlands) NED	Jordy Buijs	0	0	0	0	0	0
24	DF	(Netherlands) NED	Royston Drenthe	0	0	0	0	0	0
25	MF	(Netherlands) NED	Georgino Wijnaldum	12	1	10	1	2	0
26	FW	(Canada) CAN	Jacob Lensky	0	0	0	0	0	0
27	FW	(Netherlands) NED	Diego Biseswar	2	0	1	0	1	0
28	MF	(Netherlands) NED	Leroy Fer	16	1	13	1	3	0
29	FW	(Netherlands) NED	Tim Vincken	0	0	0	0	0	0
31	GK	(Netherlands) NED	Henk Timmer	38	0	32	0	6	0
32	GK	(Egypt) EGY	Sherif Ekramy	1	0	1	0	0	0
33	MF	(Netherlands) NED	Jonathan de Guzmán	39	11	33	9	6	2
37	GK	(Netherlands) NED	Erwin Mulder	1	0	1	0	0	0

- Source: voetbal.com

== Transfers ==
In: Note: Flags indicate national team as defined under FIFA eligibility rules; some limited exceptions apply. Players may hold more than one non-FIFA nationality.

No.	Pos.	Nation	Player
3	DF	NED	Kevin Hofland (from (Germany) VfL Wolfsburg)
5	DF	NED	Tim de Cler (from (Netherlands) AZ)
8	MF	NED	Giovanni van Bronckhorst (from (Spain) Barcelona)
9	FW	NED	Roy Makaay (from (Germany) Bayern Munich)
11	FW	NED	Andwélé Slory (from (Netherlands) Excelsior)
14	FW	NED	Michael Mols (from (Netherlands) ADO Den Haag)
16	FW	KOR	Lee Chun-soo (from (South Korea) Ulsan Hyundai)
17	MF	TUR	Nuri Şahin (loan from (Germany) Borussia Dortmund)
19	MF	NED	Denny Landzaat (from (England) Wigan Athletic)
22	FW	NED	Luigi Bruins (from (Netherlands) Excelsior)

Out: Note: Flags indicate national team as defined under FIFA eligibility rules; some limited exceptions apply. Players may hold more than one non-FIFA nationality.

No.	Pos.	Nation	Player
—	MF	GHA	Mohammed Abubakari (to (Greece) Panserraikos)
—	MF	NED	Richard Blonk (to (Netherlands) ADO Den Haag)
—	FW	NED	Romeo Castelen (to (Germany) Hamburger SV)
—	FW	GRE	Angelos Charisteas (to (Germany) 1. FC Nürnberg)
—	DF	NED	Royston Drenthe (to (Spain) Real Madrid)
—	MF	BEL	Stein Huysegems (to (Netherlands) Twente)
—	FW	FIN	Joonas Kolkka (to (Netherlands) NAC Breda)
—	DF	BEL	Philippe Léonard (to (Romania) Rapid București)
—	MF	NED	Alfred Schreuder (to (Netherlands) Twente)
—	FW	NED	Diego Biseswar (loan to (Netherlands) De Graafschap)
—	DF	NED	Jordy Buijs (loan to (Netherlands) De Graafschap)
—	DF	BEL	Pieter Collen (loan to (Belgium) Sint-Truidense)
—	FW	NED	Michael Jansen (loan to (Netherlands) De Graafschap)
—	DF	BEL	Timothy Derijck (loan to (Belgium) FCV Dender)
—	MF	CHI	Sebastián Pardo (loan to (Netherlands) Excelsior)
—	DF	TUN	Karim Saidi (loan to (Turkey) Sivasspor)
—	DF	NED	Dwight Tiendalli (loan to (Netherlands) Sparta Rotterdam)
—	FW	NED	Pierre van Hooijdonk (Stopped)
—	GK	NED	Patrick Lodewijks (Stopped)

== Club ==
=== Coaching staff ===
Position	Staff
Manager	(Netherlands) Bert van Marwijk
Assistant manager	(Netherlands) Egid Kiesouw (Netherlands) Dick Voorn
Assistant manager / Goalkeeping coach	(Netherlands) Patrick Lodewijks

Last updated: 23 September 2017

=== Kit ===
Supplier: Kappa
Sponsor(s): Fortis

Home	Away	Goalkeeper

Last updated: 23 July 2013.
Source: Feyenoord
