= 2011–12 Adelaide United FC season =

Adelaide United
2011–12 season
- Chairman: Greg Griffin
- Manager: John Kosmina (Caretaker)
- A-League: 9th
- Top goalscorer: League: Sergio van Dijk (8); All: Sergio van Dijk (8)
- Highest home attendance: 14,573 (vs Melbourne Victory, 14 October 2011)
- Lowest home attendance: 5,898 (vs Perth Glory, 1 March 2012)
- Average home league attendance: 9,292 (9,083 incl. relocated GCU match)
Home colours	Away colours

The 2011–12 Adelaide United FC season was the club's seventh A-League season. It includes the 2011–12 A-League season as well as any other competitions of the 2011–12 football season.

== Season overview ==
As of 1 April 2011, all A-League clubs were able to negotiate new kit supplier deals as the previous contract with Reebok had elapsed and as such, Adelaide United negotiated a three-year deal with Erreà.

Off-season transfers marked the departure of long serving players Travis Dodd, Lucas Pantelis and Robert Cornthwaite, and of fan favourites Mathew Leckie and Marcos Flores to overseas clubs. In a coup for the club and the A-League, Rini Coolen managed to secure the signatures of Socceroos Bruce Djite, Jon McKain and Dario Vidošić; with the latter being offered the Australian marquee player status at the club for the season. The signing of Ukrainian international, Evgeniy Levchenko completed Adelaide's foreign player quota.

It was announced at the season launch gala dinner on 26 August that the club's captain for the season would be Jon McKain, with Cássio and Eugene Galeković named as vice-captains.

During the last weeks of the off-season in September, Adelaide recruited its final players to complete the squad for the season. Ricardo Da Silva was scouted and signed from local South Australian Super League outfit, Adelaide City, whilst double-winning defenders Milan Susak and Antony Golec were signed to add extra depth to the squad.

On 30 September 2011, the club announced its intention to purchase the Veneto Club complex located in Beverley, South Australia for an estimated $4 million and rename it the "Reds Centre". It is proposed that the refurbished facilities will be used as the club's permanent training venue for the players as well as for hosting post-match gatherings. On 12 December 2011 it became evident that the deal had fallen through due to unacceptable changes made to the contract between land owners and the club. The Veneto Centre was soon thereafter sold to Royal Park Salvage, despite the final sale not being announced.

On 18 December 2011 it was announced that head coach Rini Coolen had been sacked and replaced by former coach John Kosmina as caretaker coach for the rest of the season, including the AFC Champions League group stage of 2012. As part of Kosmina's takeover of the head coaching position, Eugene Galeković was named club captain on 28 December 2011, replacing Jon McKain.

== Players ==
=== Squad information ===
N	Pos.	Nat.	Name	Age	Since	App	Goals	Ends	Transfer fee	Notes
1	GK	(Australia)	Galeković (captain)	45	2007	102	0	2014	Free	
2	CM	(Australia)	Malik	36	2011	24	0	2013	Free	Originally from Youth System
3	CB	(Australia)	Boogaard	40	2010	32	0	2012	Free	
4	CB	(Australia)	McKain	44	2011	15	0	2014	Free	
5	RB	(Australia)	Mullen	37	2008	58	2	2013	Free	
6	LWB	(Brazil)	Cássio (vice-captain)	46	2007	96	6	2013	Free	
7	CM	(Australia)	Caravella	43	2011	25	1	2013	Free	
8	DM	(Ukraine)	Levchenko	48	2011	10	0	2012	Free	
9	CF	(Indonesia)	van Dijk	44	2010	52	25	2013	Free	Foreign marquee player
10	AM	(Australia)	Vidošić	39	2011	25	5	2014	Free	Australian marquee player
11	ST	(Australia)	Djite	39	2011	59	16	2014	Free	
12	CB	(Australia)	Golec	36	2011	11	1	2014	Free	
13	AM	(Portugal)	Ricardo	43	2011	5	0	2012	Free	
14	RWB	(Australia)	Watson	39	2010	52	0	2013	Free	
15	DM	(Australia)	Melling	31	2012	9	0	2015	Youth system	
16	RM	(Australia)	Dilevski	41	2011	12	1	2012	Free	
17	LW	(Philippines)	Ramsay	38	2010	55	6	2013	Free	
18	CM	(Australia)	Barbiero	42	2007	74	8	2013	Free	
20	GK	(Australia)	Birighitti	35	2008	9	0	2012	Youth system	
21	DM	(Uruguay)	Usúcar	40	2011	29	0	2013	Free	
22	CB	(Australia)	Fyfe	44	2012	53	5	2013	Free	
24	AM	(Australia)	Kamara	30	2012	1	0	2015	Youth system	
25	ST	(Australia)	Kostopoulos	36	2012	3	0	Undisclosed	Youth system	
28	ST	(Australia)	Wooding	33	2012	1	0	Undisclosed	Youth system	
30	GK	(Australia)	Izzo	31	2012	0	0	2015	Youth system	

- Last updated: 25 March 2012
- Source: Adelaide United FC, Players in / out, Wikipedia players' articles
- Ordered by squad number.
- Notes: League appearances and goals listed (including Finals)

=== Players in / out ===
Re-signed

Name	Position	Duration	Contract expiry	Notes
(Philippines) Iain Ramsay	Midfielder	2 years	2013	
(Australia) Daniel Mullen	Defender	2 years	2013	
(Brazil) Cássio	Defender	2 years	2013	
(Australia) Fabian Barbiero	Midfielder	2 years	2013	
(Australia) Cameron Watson	Midfielder	2 years	2013	
(Uruguay) Francisco Usúcar	Midfielder	2 years	2013	
(Netherlands) Andwélé Slory	Midfielder	1 year	2012	Accepted the option to extend contract.

In

Name	Position	Moving from	Notes
(Australia) Osama Malik	Midfielder	(Australia) North Queensland Fury	2-year contract
(Australia) Zenon Caravella	Midfielder	(Australia) Gold Coast United	2-year contract
(Australia) Paul Izzo	Goalkeeper	(Australia) AIS	3-year contract beginning 1 January 2012
(Australia) Jacob Melling	Midfielder	(Australia) AIS	3-year contract beginning 1 January 2012
(Australia) Bruce Djite	Striker	(Australia) Gold Coast United	2-year contract
(Australia) Spase Dilevski	Midfielder	(Romania) Universitatea Craiova	1-year contract
(Australia) Dario Vidošić	Midfielder	(Germany) 1. FC Nürnberg	3-year contract
(Australia) Jon McKain	Defender	(Saudi Arabia) Al Nassr	3-year contract
(Ukraine) Evgeniy Levchenko	Midfielder	(Netherlands) Willem II	1-year contract
(Portugal) Ricardo Da Silva	Midfielder	(Australia) Adelaide City	1-year contract
(Australia) Antony Golec	Defender	(Australia) Sydney FC	1-year contract
(Australia) Milan Susak	Defender	(Indonesia) Minangkabau	2-year contract
(Australia) Teeboy Kamara	Midfielder	(Australia) Adelaide United (Youth)	3-year contract beginning May 2012
(Australia) Iain Fyfe	Defender	(South Korea) Busan IPark	1-year contract beginning March 2012

Out

Name	Position	Moving to	Notes
(Australia) Paul Reid	Midfielder	Released	Contract was not renewed.
(Australia) Travis Dodd	Midfielder	(Australia) Perth Glory	Contract was not renewed.
(Australia) Mathew Leckie	Midfielder	(Germany) Borussia Mönchengladbach	Contract was not renewed.; Free transfer.
(Australia) Robert Cornthwaite	Defender	(South Korea) Chunnam Dragons	Transferred at the end of the 2010/11 season.; Undisclosed transfer fee.
(Croatia) Dario Bodrušić	Defender	Released	Contract was not renewed.
(Australia) Francesco Monterosso	Striker	(Australia) Metrostars	Contract was not renewed.
(Australia) Joe Costa	Midfielder	Released	Contract was not renewed.
(Australia) Adam Hughes	Midfielder	(Australia) Perth Glory	Contract was not renewed.
(Australia) Lucas Pantelis	Midfielder	(New Zealand) Wellington Phoenix	Released from final year of contract.
(Argentina) Marcos Flores	Midfielder	(China) Henan Jianye	Transferred at the end of the 2010/11 season.; Reported transfer fee of $500,000.
(Australia) Bradley Norton	Defender	Released	Released from senior contract
(Netherlands) Andwélé Slory	Midfielder	Retired	Released from contract.
(Australia) Milan Susak	Defender	(China) Tianjin Teda	Transferred in February 2012; Reported transfer fee of $200,000

== Player statistics ==
=== Squad stats ===
				Total				A-League		A-League Finals		
N	Pos.	Name	Nat.	GS	App	Gls	Min	App	Gls	App	Gls	Notes
1	GK	Galeković	(Australia)	25	25	-42	2250	25	-42			(−) means goals conceded
2	MF	Malik	(Australia)	16	23		1482	23				
3	DF	Boogaard	(Australia)	20	20		1773	20				
4	DF	McKain	(Australia)	13	15		1229	15				
5	DF	Mullen	(Australia)	16	19	1	1386	19	1			
6	DF	Cássio	(Brazil)	14	14		1140	14				
7	MF	Caravella	(Australia)	21	25	1	1865	25	1			
8	MF	Levchenko	(Ukraine)	9	10		730	10				
9	FW	van Dijk	(Indonesia)	21	22	8	1871	22	8			
10	MF	Vidošić	(Australia)	24	25	5	1960	25	5			
11	FW	Djite	(Australia)	21	24	5	1768	24	5			
12	DF	Golec	(Australia)	10	11	1	908	11	1			
13	MF	Ricardo	(Portugal)	1	5		106	5				
14	MF	Watson	(Australia)	18	24		1747	24				
15	MF	Melling	(Australia)	1	9		283	9				
16	MF	Dilevski	(Australia)	7	12	1	640	12	1			
17	MF	Ramsay	(Philippines)	17	24	2	1613	24	2			
18	MF	Barbiero	(Australia)	14	18	2	1226	18	2			
20	GK	Birighitti	(Australia)	2	2	-1		2	-1			(−) means goals conceded
21	MF	Usúcar	(Uruguay)	14	22		1287	22				
22	DF	Fyfe	(Australia)		1		28	1				
24	MF	Kamara	(Australia)		1		27	1				Promoted from Youth squad
25	FW	Kostopoulos	(Australia)	1	2		103	2				Promoted from Youth squad
28	FW	Wooding	(Australia)		1		44	1				Promoted from Youth squad
30	GK	Izzo	(Australia)									(−) means goals conceded

Last updated: 25 March 2012
Source: Soccerway – Adelaide United 2011/12
Ordered by shirt number
0 shown as blank

==== Delisted players ====
				Total				A-League		A-League Finals		
N	Pos.	Name	Nat.	GS	App	Gls	Min	App	Gls	App	Gls	Notes
	DF	Susak	(Australia)	8	9		676	9				Transferred to Tianjin Teda in February 2012.
	MF	Slory	(Netherlands)	4	6		377	6				Retired from professional football in November 2011.

Last updated: 12 November 2011
Source: Soccerway – Adelaide United 2011/12
Ordered by shirt number
0 shown as blank

=== Disciplinary records ===
==== A-League ====
N	Pos.	Nat.	Name	Yellow card	Second yellow card	Red card	Notes
1	GK	(Australia)	Galeković	3			
2	MF	(Australia)	Malik	3			
3	DF	(Australia)	Boogaard	4	1		One match suspension for Round 9 against Central Coast Mariners.
4	DF	(Australia)	McKain	6			One match suspension for Round 12 against Sydney FC.
5	DF	(Australia)	Mullen	5			
6	DF	(Brazil)	Cássio	3			
7	MF	(Australia)	Caravella	6			
8	MF	(Ukraine)	Levchenko	4			
9	FW	(Indonesia)	van Dijk	3			
11	FW	(Australia)	Djite	4			
12	DF	(Australia)	Golec	2			
13	MF	(Portugal)	Ricardo	1			
14	MF	(Australia)	Watson	1			
15	MF	(Australia)	Melling	1			
16	MF	(Australia)	Dilevski	3			
17	MF	(Philippines)	Ramsay	1	1		One match suspension for Round 13 against Wellington Phoenix.
18	MF	(Australia)	Barbiero	4			
21	MF	(Uruguay)	Usúcar	2			
22	DF	(Australia)	Susak	2			
23	MF	(Netherlands)	Slory	2			Retired from professional football after Round 7.

Last updated: 25 March 2012
Source: Competitive matches
Only competitive matches
(yellow card) = Number of bookings; (second yellow card) = Number of sending offs after a second yellow card; (red card) = Number of sending offs by a direct red card.

=== Scorers ===
==== A-League ====
Total	Player		Goals per Round																										
Total	Player		1	2	3	4	5	6	7	8	9	10	11	12	13	14	15	16	17	18	19	20	21	22	23	24	25	26	27
8	(Indonesia)	Sergio van Dijk		1					X	X	X			X		2	1	1	1	1									1
5	(Australia)	Dario Vidošić	X		1	1					X			1		1							1						
5	(Australia)	Bruce Djite			X	X			1						1				1			1	1						X
2	(Australia)	Fabian Barbiero	X	X	X	X	X	X				1												1			X	X	X
2	(Philippines)	Iain Ramsay						1							X			X									1		X
1	(Australia)	Spase Dilevski					1					X				X	X	X	X	X	X	X	X	X	X	X	X	X	X
1	(Australia)	Zenon Caravella						1												X									X
1	(Australia)	Daniel Mullen		X			X		X	X				1								X	X	X	X				
1	(Australia)	Antony Golec	X	X	X	X	X	X	X	X	X	X	X		1						X	X	X	X	X				

A goal was scored from a penalty kick	Two goals were scored from penalty kicks	Player did not play

== Club ==
=== Coaching staff ===
Position	Staff
Manager (Caretaker)	(Australia) John Kosmina
Assistant coach	(Australia) Luciano Trani
Youth coach and Academy Manager	(Australia) Michael Valkanis
Goalkeeper coach	(Australia) Peter Blazincic
Fitness and conditioning coach	(Australia) Peter Cklamovski

Last updated: 22 December 2011
Source: Adelaide United FC

=== Managerial Changes ===
Outgoing manager	Manner of departure	Date of vacancy	Table	Incoming manager	Date of appointment	Table
(Netherlands) Rini Coolen	Demoted to oversee club youth development and academy and subsequently resigned.	18 December 2011	9th, Round 11 (11–12)	(Australia) John Kosmina	18 December 2011	Round 11 (11–12)

=== Attendance at home games ===
Week	Date	Opponent	Score AUFC – Away	Attendance	Weekday
2	14 October 2011	Melbourne Victory	1–0	14,573	Friday
3	22 October 2011	Sydney FC	1–2	12,054	Saturday
5	4 November 2011	Melbourne Heart	1–1	10,294	Friday
6	11 November 2011	Gold Coast United	2–1	6,368	Friday^{*}
8	25 November 2011	Newcastle Jets	0–0	8,403	Friday
9	2 December 2011	Central Coast Mariners	0–4	8,437	Friday
11	16 December 2011	Gold Coast United	0–3	7,967	Friday
13	30 December 2011	Wellington Phoenix	2–0	9,739	Friday
15	7 January 2012	Brisbane Roar	1–1	11,274	Saturday
19	29 January 2012	Perth Glory	0–3	9,063	Sunday
20	3 February 2012	Wellington Phoenix	1–2	8,425	Friday
22	19 February 2012	Sydney FC	1–2	8,259	Sunday
24	1 March 2012	Perth Glory	0–2	5,898	Thursday
27	23 March 2012	Melbourne Heart	1–1	6,411	Friday

* Note: The Round 6 away match against Gold Coast United was moved from Skilled Park to Hindmarsh Stadium and re-classified as an Adelaide United home game.

== Competitions ==
=== Overall ===
Competition	Started round	Current position / round	Final position / round	First match	Last match
AFC Champions League	Qualifying play-off	—	Quarter-finals	16 February 2012	3 October 2012
A-League	—	—	9th	9 October 2011	23 March 2012

Source: Competitions

=== Pre-season ===
29 June 2011	Adelaide United	1–0	Adelaide Galaxy	Hindmarsh Stadium, Adelaide
Wednesday 19:30	Ricardo	Report		Attendance: Closed to the public

26 July 2011	Adelaide United	3–1	Campbelltown	Hindmarsh Stadium, Adelaide
Tuesday 18:30	Slory; Djite; Kostopoulos		Nelson	Attendance: Closed to the public

2 August 2011	Adelaide United	9–0	Croydon Kings	Hindmarsh Stadium, Adelaide
Tuesday 18:30	Djite; Dilevski van Dijk (pen.); Kostopoulos; Kamau			Attendance: Closed to the public

9 August 2011	Adelaide United	5–0	Western Strikers	Hindmarsh Stadium, Adelaide
Tuesday 18:30	van Dijk; Djite; Kostopoulos			Attendance: Closed to the public

16 August 2011	Adelaide United	3–0	Para Hills Knights	Hindmarsh Stadium, Adelaide
Tuesday 18:30	van Dijk; Djite			Attendance: Closed to the public

2 September 2011	Adelaide United	4–2	Adelaide Galaxy	Hindmarsh Stadium, Adelaide
Friday 18:30	Slory; Djite; Cássio		Briscoe	Attendance: Closed to the public

30 September 2011	Adelaide United	4–1	Adelaide Blue Eagles	Hindmarsh Stadium, Adelaide
Friday 18:30	van Dijk 14', 22'; Slory 55'; Malik 74'	Report	42' Filletti	Attendance: Closed to the public

9 September 2011	Adelaide United	0–0	Gold Coast United	Hindmarsh Stadium, Adelaide
Friday 19:30	Ramsay (yellow card) 44'; McKain (yellow card) 49'	Report	(yellow card) 58' Rožić	Attendance: 2,269; Referee: Jarred Gillett

17 September 2011	Brisbane Roar	0–3	Adelaide United	Clive Berghofer Stadium, Toowoomba
Saturday 18:30	Stefanutto (yellow card) 64'	Report	10' (o.g.) Murdocca; (yellow card) 23' Dilevski; (yellow card) 43' Levchenko; 48' Djite; 69' Lastella

23 September 2011	Adelaide United	1–1	Melbourne Victory	Hindmarsh Stadium, Adelaide
Friday 19:30	Slory (yellow card) 20' (goal) 40'	Report	(yellow card) 63' Leijer; 89' Hernández	Attendance: 9,543; Referee: David Costello

=== A-League ===
==== League table ====
Pos	Team	Pld	W	D	L	GF	GA	GD	Pts	Qualification
1	Central Coast Mariners	27	15	6	6	40	24	+16	51	Qualification for 2013 AFC Champions League group stage and finals series (Note: First place qualifies for the 2013 AFC Champions League group stage. Winning the 2012 A-League Grand Final automatically earns qualification for the 2013 AFC Champions League qualifying play-off, unless first place are champions.)
2	Brisbane Roar (C)	27	14	7	6	50	28	+22	49	Qualification for 2013 AFC Champions League qualifying play-off and finals series
3	Perth Glory	27	13	4	10	40	35	+5	43	Qualification for Finals series
4	Wellington Phoenix	27	12	4	11	34	32	+2	40	Qualification for Finals series
5	Sydney FC	27	10	8	9	37	42	−5	38	Qualification for Finals series
6	Melbourne Heart	27	9	10	8	35	34	+1	37	Qualification for Finals series
7	Newcastle Jets	27	10	5	12	38	41	−3	35	
8	Melbourne Victory	27	6	11	10	35	43	−8	29	
9	Adelaide United	27	5	10	12	26	44	−18	25	
10	Gold Coast United	27	4	9	14	30	42	−12	21	

Source: ultimatealeague.com
Rules for classification: 1) points; 2) goal difference; 3) number of goals scored.
(C) Champions

==== Results summary ====
Overall								Home						Away					
Pld	W	D	L	GF	GA	GD	Pts	W	D	L	GF	GA	GD	W	D	L	GF	GA	GD
27	5	10	12	26	44	−18	25	3	4	7	11	22	−11	2	6	5	15	22	−7

Last updated: 25 March 2012.
Source: Competitive Matches

==== Results by round ====
Round	1	2	3	4	5	6	7	8	9	10	11	12	13	14	15	16	17	18	19	20	21	22	23	24	25	26	27
Ground	A	H	H	A	H	H	A	H	H	A	H	A	H	A	H	A	A	R	H	H	A	H	A	H	A	A	H
Result	L	W	L	L	D	W	D	D	L	D	L	D	W	W	D	D	L	D	L	L	W	L	L	L	D	L	D
Position	9	4	6	9	9	7	8	9	9	9	9	10	9	7	8	8	8	7	9	9	9	9	9	9	9	9	9

Updated to match(es) played on 19 March 2012. Source: Competitive Matches
A = Away; H = Home; W = Win; D = Draw; L = Loss
Notes:
Round 18 to be played at a regional centre; R = Regional.
Round 6 away match against Gold Coast United moved from Skilled Park to Hindmarsh Stadium and re-classified as an Adelaide United home game.

==== Matches ====
9 October 2011 Round 1	Perth Glory	1–0	Adelaide United	nib Stadium, Perth
Sunday 19:00	Burns (yellow card) 49'; Mehmet (yellow card) 58' (goal) 76'; Vukovic (yellow card) 86'	Report; Summary	(yellow card) 37' Levchenko	Attendance: 9,452; Referee: Jarred Gillett

14 October 2011 Round 2	Adelaide United	1–0	Melbourne Victory	Hindmarsh Stadium, Adelaide
Friday 19:30	Slory (yellow card) 28' van Dijk 52'	Report; Summary	(yellow card) 28' (yellow-red card) 55' Leijer; (yellow card) 83' Kewell	Attendance: 14,573; Referee: Ben Williams

22 October 2011 Round 3	Adelaide United	1–2	Sydney FC	Hindmarsh Stadium, Adelaide
Saturday 17:00	Vidošić 28'; Dilevski (yellow card) 35'; Slory (yellow card) 73'	Report; Summary	60' Coyne; 81' Carle	Attendance: 12,054; Referee: Gerard Parsons

28 October 2011 Round 4	Brisbane Roar	7–1	Adelaide United	Suncorp Stadium, Brisbane
Friday 19:30	Henrique 21' (pen.), 36' (pen.); Berisha 23', 26', 29', 69'; Danning (yellow card) 71'; Issey 81'	Report; Summary	5' Vidošić; (yellow card) 20' McKain; (yellow card) 35' Cássio; (yellow card) 47' Susak	Attendance: 11,762; Referee: Strebre Delovski

4 November 2011 Round 5	Adelaide United	1–1	Melbourne Heart	Hindmarsh Stadium, Adelaide
Friday 19:30	Levchenko (yellow card) 37'; Caravella (yellow card) 44'; Ramsay (yellow card) 63'; Dilevski 78'; McKain (yellow card) 83'	Report; Summary	(yellow card) 9' Williams; (yellow card) 25' (yellow-red card) 77' Colosimo; 49' Hamill; (yellow card) 53' Behich	Attendance: 10,294; Referee: Jarred Gillett

11 November 2011 Round 6	Adelaide United	2–1	Gold Coast United	Hindmarsh Stadium, Adelaide^{*}
Friday 19:30	Cássio (yellow card) 5'; McKain (yellow card) 49'; Djite (yellow card) 55'; Caravella 57'; Ramsay 69'	Report; Summary	(yellow card) 17' Halloran; (yellow card) 21' Traoré; 66' J. Brown	Attendance: 6,368; Referee: Chris Beath

19 November 2011 Round 7	Wellington Phoenix	1–1	Adelaide United	Eden Park, Auckland
Saturday 14:30	T. Brown (yellow card) 38'; Lia (yellow card) 77'; Boogaard 83' (o.g.)	Report; Summary	(yellow card) 33' Dilevski; 45' Djite; (yellow card) 67' Usúcar; (yellow card) 79' Caravella; (yellow card) 90+3' Ricardo	Attendance: 20,078; Referee: Peter Green

25 November 2011 Round 8	Adelaide United	0–0	Newcastle Jets	Hindmarsh Stadium, Adelaide
Friday 19:30	Usúcar (yellow card) 30'; Boogaard (yellow card) 33' (yellow-red card) 65'; Caravella (yellow card) 59'; Djite (yellow card) 90'	Report; Summary	(yellow card) 56' Topor-Stanley; (yellow card) 70' Ry. Griffiths; (yellow card) 90+1' Calvano	Attendance: 8,403; Referee: Matthew Gillett

2 December 2011 Round 9	Adelaide United	0–4	Central Coast Mariners	Hindmarsh Stadium, Adelaide
Friday 19:30	Susak (yellow card) 16'; McKain (yellow card) 38'; Mullen (yellow card) 73'	Report; Summary	(yellow card) 19' Rose; 30' Amini; 32' Ibini-Isei; 38' (pen.) (yellow card) 79' Zwaanswijk; 66' Ro. Griffiths; (yellow card) 83' Bojić	Attendance: 8,437; Referee: Kris Griffiths-Jones

10 December 2011 Round 10	Melbourne Victory	1–1	Adelaide United	Etihad Stadium, Melbourne
Saturday 19:15	Thompson 58'	Report; Summary	(yellow card) 32' (goal) 81' Barbiero	Attendance: 16,562; Referee: Peter Green

16 December 2011 Round 11	Adelaide United	0–3	Gold Coast United	Hindmarsh Stadium, Adelaide
Friday 19:35	McKain (yellow card) 35'; Dilevski (yellow card) 73'; Djite (yellow card) 85'	Report; Summary	19' Halloran; 36' Rigters; (yellow card) 43' (goal) 90+3' Macallister; (yellow card) 64' (yellow-red card) 76' Rožić; (yellow card) 89' Thwaite	Attendance: 7,967; Referee: Ryan Shepheard

22 December 2011 Round 12	Sydney FC	2–2	Adelaide United	Sydney Football Stadium, Sydney
Thursday 19:00	Kisel 19' (pen.); McFlynn (yellow card) 43'; Reddy (yellow card) 55'; Bosschaart (yellow card) 64'; Petratos 66'; Cazarine (yellow card) 70'	Report; Summary	8' (yellow card) 14' Mullen; (yellow card) 18' Boogaard; (yellow card) 34' (yellow-red card) 88' Ramsay; 56' Vidošić	Attendance: 10,212; Referee: Jarred Gillett

30 December 2011 Round 13	Adelaide United	2–0	Wellington Phoenix	Hindmarsh Stadium, Adelaide
Friday 19:30	Djite 17'; Golec 62'; McKain (yellow card) 71' van Dijk (yellow card) 82'; Caravella (yellow card) 85'	Report; Summary	(yellow card) 13' Brown; (yellow card) 51' Muscat; (yellow card) 78' Lochhead	Attendance: 9,739; Referee: Chris Beath

4 January 2012 Round 14	Melbourne Heart	1–3	Adelaide United	AAMI Park, Melbourne
Wednesday 14:45	Babalj 90'	Report; Summary	37' (pen.), 78' van Dijk; 47' Vidošić; (yellow card) 59' Golec; (yellow card) 80' Barbiero; (yellow card) 83' Mullen	Attendance: 8,272; Referee: Kris Griffiths-Jones

7 January 2012 Round 15	Adelaide United	1–1	Brisbane Roar	Hindmarsh Stadium, Adelaide
Saturday 17:00	Barbiero (yellow card) 45' van Dijk (yellow card) 54' (goal) 78' (pen.)	Report; Summary	(yellow card) 45' (goal) 59' Issey; (yellow card) 77' Smith	Attendance: 11,274; Referee: Ben Williams

13 January 2012 Round 16	Melbourne Victory	1–1	Adelaide United	AAMI Park, Melbourne
Friday 19:30	A. Thompson 6'; Brebner (yellow card) 44'; Fabio (yellow card) 82'	Report; Summary	53' van Dijk; (yellow card) 66' Boogaard	Attendance: 20,959; Referee: Jarred Gillett

21 January 2012 Round 17	Central Coast Mariners	3–2	Adelaide United	Bluetongue Stadium, Gosford
Saturday 17:00	McBreen 14'; Rose (yellow card) 27' (goal) 77'; Hutchinson (yellow card) 58'; Kwasnik 74'	Report; Summary	15' van Dijk; 18' Djite	Attendance: 7,478; Referee: Kris Griffiths-Jones

25 January 2012 Round 18	Adelaide United	1–1	Newcastle Jets	Carrington Park, Bathurst
Wednesday 19:30	Barbiero (yellow card) 41' van Dijk 57'; Malik (yellow card) 90'; Boogaard (yellow card) 90+1'; Galeković (yellow card) 90+2'; Mullen (yellow card) 90+3'	Report; Summary	(yellow card) 65' Tiago; 72' Wheelhouse	Attendance: 2,363; Referee: Alan Milliner

29 January 2012 Round 19	Adelaide United	0–3	Perth Glory	Hindmarsh Stadium, Adelaide
Sunday 16:30		Report; Summary	15' Smeltz; 20' McGarry; (yellow card) 41' Burns; (yellow card) 55' van den Brink; (yellow card) 78' Hughes; (yellow card) 79' Vukovic; 82' Miller; (yellow card) 90+1' Pantelidis	Attendance: 9,063; Referee: Jarred Gillett

3 February 2012 Round 20	Adelaide United	1–2	Wellington Phoenix	Hindmarsh Stadium, Adelaide
Friday 19:30	Djite 10'; Malik (yellow card) 37'	Report; Summary	14' T. Brown; 38' Sánchez; (yellow card) 54' Muscat; (yellow card) 78' Sigmund; (yellow card) 87' Ifill; (yellow card) 90+3' Daniel	Attendance: 8,425; Referee: Gerard Parsons

12 February 2012 Round 21	Gold Coast United	1–2	Adelaide United	Skilled Park, Robina
Sunday 17:00	Boogaard 6' (o.g.); Thwaite (yellow card) 19'	Report; Summary	(yellow card) 16' Watson; (yellow card) 34' Levchenko; 41' (yellow card) 50' Djite; 60' Vidošić	Attendance: 1,723; Referee: Chris Beath

19 February 2012 Round 22	Adelaide United	1–2	Sydney FC	Hindmarsh Stadium, Adelaide
Sunday 18:30	Cássio (yellow card) 53'; Barbiero 56'	Report; Summary	45+1' Chianese; 81' Mallia; (yellow card) 85' Cole	Attendance: 8,259; Referee: Kris Griffiths-Jones

24 February 2012 Round 23	Newcastle Jets	1–0	Adelaide United	Hunter Stadium, Newcastle
Friday 19:30	Elrich 39'; Zadkovich (yellow card) 57'; Regan (yellow card) 85'; Bridges (yellow card) 90+2'	Report; Summary	(yellow card) 13' Levchenko; (yellow card) 56' Melling	Attendance: 10,383; Referee: Ben Williams

1 March 2012 Round 24	Adelaide United	0–2	Perth Glory	Hindmarsh Stadium, Adelaide
Thursday 19:30^{†}	Galeković (yellow card) 6' van Dijk (yellow card) 87'	Report; Summary	6' Mehmet; 24' Burns; (yellow card) 32' Dodd; (yellow card) 57' Pantelidis	Attendance: 5,898; Referee: Matthew Gillett

11 March 2012 Round 25	Brisbane Roar	1–1	Adelaide United	Suncorp Stadium, Brisbane
Sunday 16:30	Berisha 70'; Franjic (yellow card) 79'	Report; Summary	14' Ramsay; (yellow card) 38' Caravella; (yellow card) 44' Malik	Attendance: 10,739; Referee: Strebre Delovski

17 March 2012 Round 26	Central Coast Mariners	1–0	Adelaide United	Bluetongue Stadium, Gosford
Saturday 17:00	Ibini 47'	Report; Summary	(yellow card) 19' Golec; (yellow card) 86' Caravella; (yellow card) 90' Galeković; (yellow card) 90+3' Boogaard	Attendance: 7,275; Referee: Ben Williams

23 March 2012 Round 27	Adelaide United	1–1	Melbourne Heart	Hindmarsh Stadium, Adelaide
Friday 19:30	van Dijk 37' (pen.); Mullen (yellow card) 78'	Report; Summary	(yellow card) 37' Colosimo; (yellow card) 44' Srhoj; 68' Babalj	Attendance: 6,411; Referee: Adam Kersey

* Note: The Round 6 away match against Gold Coast United was moved from Skilled Park to Hindmarsh Stadium and re-classified as an Adelaide United home game.
† Note: The Round 24 home match against Perth Glory was moved from 4 to 1 March to accommodate AFC Champions League participation.

=== AFC Champions League ===
==== Qualifying play-off ====
16 February 2012 Final Round	Adelaide United (Australia)	3–0	(Indonesia) Persipura Jayapura	Adelaide, Australia
Thursday 19:30	Boogaard 12'; Levchenko 57'; Barbiero (yellow card) 67' van Dijk 84'	AFC Preview; AFC Report; Club Report; Summary	(yellow card) 32' Bonai; (yellow card) 39' Beto	Stadium: Hindmarsh Stadium; Attendance: 5,013; Referee: Masaaki Toma (Japan)

==== Group stage ====
Pos	Team	Pld	W	D	L	GF	GA	GD	Pts	Qualification	ADE	BYD	POH	GMB
1	(Australia) Adelaide United	6	4	1	1	7	2	+5	13	Advance to knockout stage	—	0–0	1–0	2–0
2	(Uzbekistan) Bunyodkor	6	3	1	2	8	7	+1	10	Advance to knockout stage	1–2	—	1–0	3–2
3	(South Korea) Pohang Steelers	6	3	0	3	6	4	+2	9		1–0	0–2	—	2–0
4	(Japan) Gamba Osaka	6	1	0	5	5	13	−8	3		0–2	3–1	0–3	—

Source: WorldFootball.net

6 March 2012 Match Day 1	Bunyodkor (Uzbekistan)	1–2	(Australia) Adelaide United	Tashkent, Uzbekistan
Tuesday 22:30	Murzoev 90+4'	AFC Report; Club Report; Summary	12' Boogaard; 53' Golec; (yellow card) 90+4' Vidošić	Stadium: JAR Stadium; Attendance: 7,000; Referee: Andre El Haddad (Lebanon)

20 March 2012 Match Day 2	Adelaide United (Australia)	2–0	(Japan) Gamba Osaka	Adelaide, Australia
Tuesday 19:30	Mullen 14', 21' (yellow card) 35'	AFC Report; Club Report; Summary	(yellow card) 24' Nakazawa; (yellow card) 90+1' Kaji	Stadium: Hindmarsh Stadium; Attendance: 5,112; Referee: Mohamed Abdelkarim Mohamed Ismail Alzarooni (United Arab Emirates)

3 April 2012 Match Day 3	Pohang Steelers (South Korea)	1–0	(Australia) Adelaide United	Pohang, South Korea
Tuesday 20:30	Dae-Ho 68'	AFC Report; Club Report; Summary		Stadium: Steelyard Stadium; Attendance: 2,833; Referee: Khalil Al Ghamdi (Saudi Arabia)

18 April 2012 Match Day 4	Adelaide United (Australia)	1–0	(South Korea) Pohang Steelers	Adelaide, Australia
Wednesday 19:30	Djite 90'	AFC Report; Club Report; Summary	(yellow card) 36' Won-Il; (yellow card) 63' Ji-Soo; (yellow card) 83' Hyung-Min	Stadium: Hindmarsh Stadium; Attendance: 7,659; Referee: Hai Tan (China)

2 May 2012 Match Day 5	Adelaide United (Australia)	0–0	(Uzbekistan) Bunyodkor	Adelaide, Australia
Wednesday 19:30	Cássio (yellow card) 15'; Kostopoulos (yellow card) 87'	AFC Report; Club Report; Summary	(yellow card) 64' Murzoev; (yellow card) 71' Shorakhmedov	Stadium: Hindmarsh Stadium; Attendance: 7,794; Referee: Liu Kwok Man (Hong Kong)

16 May 2012 Match Day 6	Gamba Osaka (Japan)	0–2	(Australia) Adelaide United	Suita, Japan
Wednesday 19:30		AFC Report; Club Report; Summary	65' van Dijk; (yellow card) 80' Djite; 88' (o.g.) Sato	Stadium: Osaka Expo '70 Stadium; Attendance: 7,294; Referee: Nawaf Shukrulla (Bahrain)

==== Round of 16 ====
29 May 2012 Round of 16	Adelaide United (Australia)	1–0	(Japan) Nagoya Grampus	Adelaide, Australia
Tuesday 19:30	McKain 42'; Caravella (yellow card) 54'	AFC Report; Club Report; Summary	(yellow card) 73' Daniel	Stadium: Hindmarsh Stadium; Attendance: 9,758; Referee: Malik Abdul Bashir (Singapore)

==== Quarter-finals ====
19 September 2012 First Leg	Adelaide United (Australia)	2–2	(Uzbekistan) Bunyodkor	Adelaide, Australia
Wednesday 19:30	Ramsay 8'; Kostopoulos 18', (yellow card) 60'; Boogaard (red card) 42'; Fyfe (yellow card) 49'	AFC Report; Club Report; Summary	44' Hasanov; (yellow card) 46' Karimov; (yellow card) 73' Murzoev; 75' Salomov	Stadium: Hindmarsh Stadium; Attendance: 10,366; Referee: Abdullah Al Hilali (Oman)

3 October 2012 Second Leg	Bunyodkor (Uzbekistan)	3–2 (a.e.t.) (5–4 agg.)	(Australia) Adelaide United	Tashkent, Uzbekistan
Wednesday 23:30	Turaev 20'; Hasanov (yellow card) 66'; Shorakhmedov 67'; Ibrokhimov (yellow card) 76'; Gafurov (yellow card) 88' (yellow-red card) 100'; Rakhmatullaev 104'	AFC Report; Club Report; Summary	4' Ramsay; (yellow card) 31' Kostopoulos; (yellow card) 55' Bowles; 62' (yellow card) 112' Jerónimo; (yellow card) 66' Vidošić; (yellow card) 69' (yellow-red card) 88' Barbiero; (yellow card) 85' (yellow-red card) 120' Fyfe	Stadium: JAR Stadium; Attendance: 7,212; Referee: Ali Abdulnabi (Bahrain)
