= 2004–05 AZ Alkmaar season =

AZ Alkmaar
2004–05 season
- Manager: (Netherlands) Co Adriaanse
- Stadium: Alkmaarderhout
- Eredivisie: 3rd
- KNVB Cup: Round of 16
- UEFA Cup: Semi-finals
- Top goalscorer: Kenneth Perez (13)

During the 2004–05 Dutch football season, AZ Alkmaar competed in the Eredivisie.

== Season summary ==
AZ reached the UEFA Cup semi-finals, the farthest they had progressed in Europe since winning the UEFA Cup in 1981.

== First-team squad ==
Squad at end of season

Note: Flags indicate national team as defined under FIFA eligibility rules; some limited exceptions apply. Players may hold more than one non-FIFA nationality.

No.	Pos.	Nation	Player
1	GK	NED	Henk Timmer
2	DF	NED	Jan Kromkamp
3	DF	NED	Kew Jaliens
4	DF	NED	Barry Opdam
5	DF	NED	Joris Mathijsen
6	MF	NED	Denny Landzaat
7	FW	MAR	Ali Elkhattabi
8	MF	NED	Olaf Lindenbergh
9	FW	BEL	Stein Huysegems
10	MF	MAR	Adil Ramzi
11	MF	MAR	Tarik Sektioui
12	DF	FIN	Juha Reini

No.	Pos.	Nation	Player
14	DF	NED	Tom Zoontjes
15	DF	NED	Tim de Cler
17	MF	NED	Martijn Meerdink
18	MF	NED	Michael Buskermolen
19	FW	NED	Robin Nelisse
20	MF	NED	Barry van Galen
21	FW	DEN	Kenneth Perez
22	FW	NED	Arjan Wisse
24	GK	NED	Theo Zwarthoed
27	MF	NED	Haris Medunjanin
29	DF	NED	Ron Vlaar
33	MF	ANT	Christy Janga

=== Left club during season ===
Note: Flags indicate national team as defined under FIFA eligibility rules; some limited exceptions apply. Players may hold more than one non-FIFA nationality.

No.	Pos.	Nation	Player
13	DF	ESP	José Fortes Rodríguez (to RBC Roosendaal)
16	MF	NED	Miel Mans (on loan to MVV)

No.	Pos.	Nation	Player
—	MF	NED	Reinier Robbemond (to De Graafschap)

== Transfers ==
=== In ===
- (Netherlands) Kew Jaliens - (Netherlands) Willem II
- (Netherlands) Joris Mathijsen - (Netherlands) Willem II
- (Morocco) Tarik Sektioui - (Netherlands) Willem II

== Results ==
=== UEFA Cup ===
==== First round ====
- PAOK 2-3 AZ
- AZ 1-1 PAOK

==== Group stage ====
- AZ 2–0 Auxerre
- Amica Wronki 1–3 AZ
- AZ 1–0 Rangers
- Grazer AK 2–0 AZ

==== Round of 32 ====
- Alemannia Aachen 0-0 AZ
- AZ 2-1 Alemannia Aachen

==== Round of 16 ====
- Shakhtar Donetsk 1-3 AZ
- AZ 2-1 Shakhtar Donetsk

==== Quarter-finals ====
- Villarreal 1-2 AZ
- AZ 1-1 Villarreal

==== Semi-finals ====
28 April 2005	Sporting CP (Portugal)	2–1	(Netherlands) AZ	Lisbon
	Douala 37'; Pinilla 80'	Report	Landzaat 36'

5 May 2005	AZ (Netherlands)	3–2 (a.e.t.)	(Portugal) Sporting CP	Alkmaar
	Perez 6'; Huysegems 79'; Jaliens 109'	Report	Liédson 45+3'; Miguel Garcia 120+2'
