= Zenon Caravella =

Australian football player

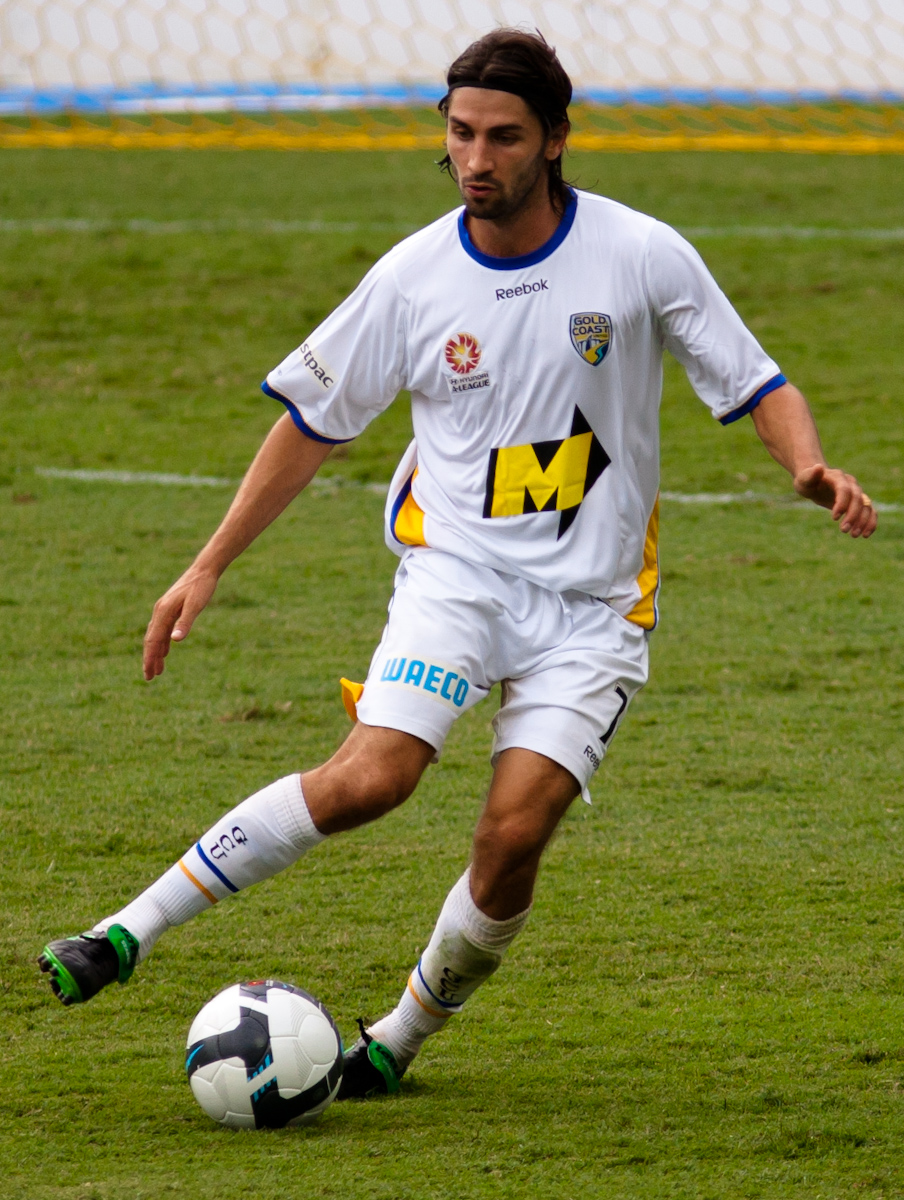
- Caravella playing for Gold Coast United in 2010

Personal information
- Full name: Zenon Mauro Caravella
- Date of birth: 17 May 1983 (age 43)
- Place of birth: Cairns, Australia
- Height: 1.70 m (5 ft 7 in)
- Position: Central midfielder

Senior career*
Years	Team	Apps	(Gls)
2001	St. George		
2001–2005	Sydney Olympic	50	(7)
2005–2006	New Zealand Knights	21	(0)
2006–2008	FC Omniworld	52	(6)
2009–2011	Gold Coast United	52	(1)
2011–2013	Adelaide United	29	(1)
2013–2014	Newcastle Jets	25	(0)
2014	FNQ FC Heat	6	(0)
2014–2015	Newcastle Jets	20	(0)
2020–2021	Leichhardt FC	8	(1)
- * Club domestic league appearances and goals as of 15 November 2021

Zenon Caravella (born 17 March 1983) is an Australian former soccer player who last played for Newcastle Jets in the A-League.

== Club career ==
After the demise of the A League in Caravella played for Sydney Olympic in the NSW Premier League becoming one of their best players. He was scouted by other clubs during the 2004–2005 season including Malaysian club, Johor FC, before eventually being signed by John Adshead, the head coach of New Zealand Knights inaugural A-League campaign.

He was scouted by a Dutch agent and on 1 January 2006 moved to the Netherlands to play for Eerste Divisie team FC Omniworld. After a year at FC Omniworld his contract was extended for another year. He was purportedly chased by top Eerste Divisie club, FC Den Bosch, but he ultimately ended up re-signing with FC Omniworld. His contract ultimately ran its course with both parties parting mutually.

Following Caravella's stint at Omniworld, various media outlets reported him to being chased by various Serie B clubs in Italy, namely Bari and Piacenza.

On 3 December 2008 he was signed by Gold Coast United after knocking back offers from Serie B clubs. He scored his first goal for the club on 29 January in a 1–0 win against Melbourne Victory. After his debut season at Gold Coast United, he won then Coach Miron Bleiberg's Player of the Year, and Goal of the Year.

In July 2010, it was reported and confirmed that an official offer for transfer came from Turkish Super Lig side Konyaspor, estimated to be around A$300,000. Gold Coast United manager Miron Bleiberg confirmed this offer in which he advised that after much deliberation the club were happy to agree to terms however the decision lay with Caravella as he had to take into consideration his growing online boutique wine business, Red White and Bubbles. Caravella ultimately declined the offer, believed to be worth A$450,000 a season for 3 years.

On 13 January 2011 he signed a 2-year deal to play with Adelaide United in the A-League.

In October 2011, Zenon Caravella was one of 20 Australian players hand picked by National Team Coach Holger Osieck to attend an Australian National Football Team Camp

After Caravella's debut season with Adelaide United, he won the prestigious Club Champion award, the highest accolade a player can be given at the club'

On 23 January 2013, A-League club Newcastle Jets announced the signing of Caravella for the remainder of the 2012/2013 season and the 2013/2014 season.

In October 2013, Caravella agreed to another extension with the Jets, securing a future with the club until the completion of the 2014/15 season.

In June 2014, it was unexpectedly announced that Zenon Caravella had requested a release from the remaining year of his Jets contract, citing business opportunities as the reason for his exit. The club has confirmed it would prefer Caravella fulfil his contractual obligations as a key player for the Jets, but agreed to terminate as he would relocate to his hometown of Cairns to run his family business. Caravella has since stated he would like to stay involved in football in Far North Queensland.

In July 2014, Caravella announced the launch of Caravella Coaching, a private football coaching school based in Cairns, aimed at training kids aged between 6–16 in both private and group settings. Furthermore, Caravella signed with local side FNQ FC Heat.

In October 2014, after playing 6 matches for FNQ Heat and helping them reach second place, Caravella was called out of retirement to return to the Newcastle Jets to help improve their midfield depth and was a starter for most of the season.

After a tumultuous season with Newcastle Jets under Nathan Tinkler – which saw 5 players sensationally sacked mid-season – Caravella was offered the captain's armband and refused on principle and loyalty to his exiled teammates. It is believed this led to the non-renewal of his contract as he was arguably the Newcastle Jets most influential player at the time.

In July 2015, after a 15-year career at the highest level, Caravella returned to Cairns and announced his retirement. to start FNQ's first fully integrated football academy called Caravella Football Academy.

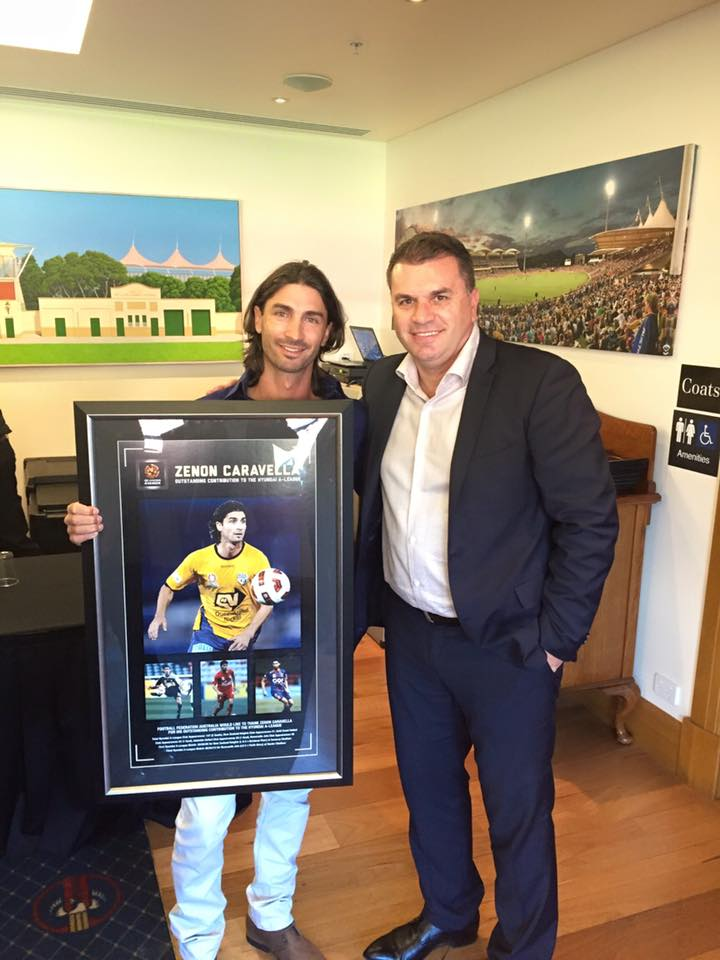
Zenon Caravella with Ange Postecoglou

In May, 2016, Zenon Caravella was honoured by the FFA at the A-League Grand Final in front of 50,000 fans for his "Outstanding Contribution to the A-League", an accolade only a handful of players are presented with each year.

== Style of play ==
Caravella played as a midfielder. He was known for his technical ability.

== Personal life ==
Zenon is of Italian descent and is the nephew of Frank Farina. He has been married. He has two daughters.

== Honours ==
Personal honours:

- Adelaide United Club Champion: 2011–12
- Gold Coast United Coach's Player of the Year 2009–10
- NSL Champions Sydney Olympic 2001/2002
- FFA Honouree "Outstanding Contribution to the A-League" 2016
