= Haris Medunjanin =

Bosnian footballer (born 1985)

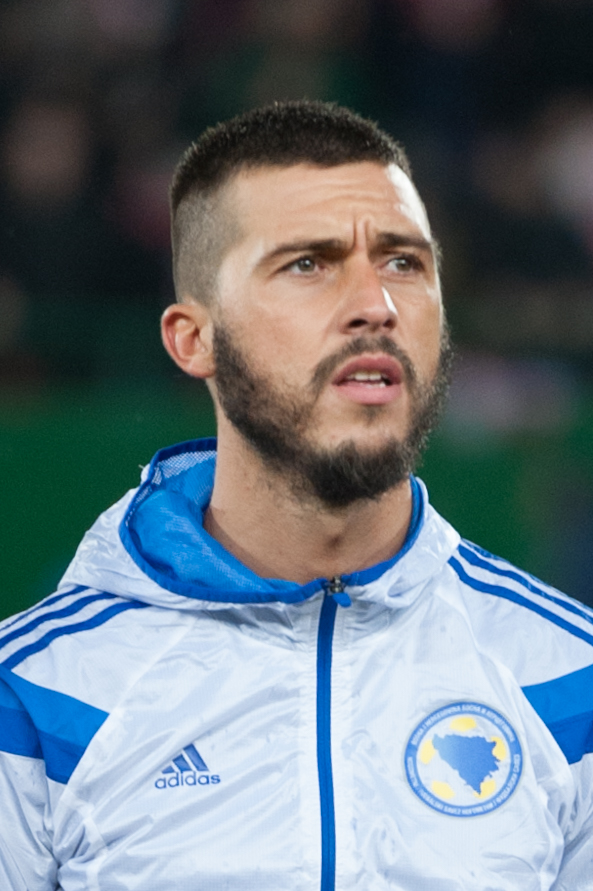
- Medunjanin with Bosnia and Herzegovina in 2015

Personal information
- Full name: Haris Medunjanin
- Date of birth: 8 March 1985 (age 41)
- Place of birth: Sarajevo, SFR Yugoslavia
- Height: 1.86 m (6 ft 1 in)
- Position: Midfielder

Team information
- Current team: NEC (assistant)

Youth career
- Swift Atletiek
- AFC'34
- AZ

Senior career*
Years	Team	Apps	(Gls)
2004–2008	AZ	25	(4)
2006–2007	→ Sparta Rotterdam (loan)	32	(7)
2008–2010	Valladolid	42	(7)
2010–2013	Maccabi Tel Aviv	46	(9)
2012–2013	→ Gaziantepspor (loan)	30	(4)
2013–2014	Gaziantepspor	32	(2)
2014–2016	Deportivo La Coruña	24	(2)
2016–2017	Maccabi Tel Aviv	33	(4)
2017–2019	Philadelphia Union	98	(5)
2020–2022	FC Cincinnati	70	(4)
2022–2023	PEC	24	(6)
2023–2024	Castellón	31	(9)
Total		487	(63)

International career
2006–2007	Netherlands U21	7	(0)
2009–2018	Bosnia and Herzegovina	60	(9)

Managerial career
- 2024–2025: Castellón (assistant)
- 2025–: NEC (assistant)
Medal record
Men's football
Representing Netherlands
UEFA European Under-21 Championship
Winner	2006 Portugal
Winner	2007 Netherlands
- * Club domestic league appearances and goals

Haris Medunjanin (Bosnian pronunciation: [xâːris medûːɲanin]; born 8 March 1985) is a Bosnian former professional footballer who played as a midfielder. He is the current assistant manager of Eredivisie club NEC Nijmegen.

He started his professional career at AZ, who loaned him to Sparta Rotterdam in 2006. In 2008 he joined Valladolid, before signing with Maccabi Tel Aviv two years later. He was loaned to Gaziantepspor in 2012, signing on a permanent basis the following season; in 2016 he returned to Maccabi and, one year later, moved to the Philadelphia Union.

Medunjanin represented the Netherlands at under-21 level, but in 2009 he decided to play for Bosnia and Herzegovina as a senior. His international career lasted until 2018, with the highlight being appearing at the 2014 FIFA World Cup.

== Club career ==
=== AZ ===
Medunjanin was born in Sarajevo, Socialist Republic of Bosnia and Herzegovina, Socialist Federal Republic of Yugoslavia. He made his Eredivisie debut on 20 February 2005, with AZ Alkmaar. During his three-year spell, however, opportunities were scarce.

For the 2006–07 season, Medunjanin was loaned to Sparta Rotterdam. He was essential as the modest club finished 13th by scoring seven league goals.

=== Valladolid ===
After another unassuming campaign in Alkmaar, Medunjanin was acquired by Spain's Real Valladolid in August 2008. He was relatively used in his first year, mainly as a substitute.

In 2009–10, Medunjanin netted all of his five La Liga goals as a late substitute. In January 2010, he and other teammates were fined €6,000 for breaching club discipline by "engaging in untimely nocturnal activities", and the team was also eventually relegated.

=== Maccabi Tel Aviv ===
Medunjanin signed a four-year contract with Maccabi Tel Aviv F.C. in Israel in July 2010, for €1.8 million. He made his official debut for his new team on the 15th in a UEFA Europa League second qualifying round against FK Mogren, and scored in the 2–0 home win.

=== Gaziantepspor ===
On 31 August 2012, Medunjanin signed with Turkish side Gaziantepspor on loan from Maccabi. The move was made permanent before the start of the following season, on a three-year deal.

=== Deportivo ===
On 12 August 2014, after a successful medical, free agent Medunjanin joined Deportivo de La Coruña. On 29 January 2016, having been deemed surplus to requirements by new manager Víctor Sánchez, he terminated his contract, and agreed to a one-and-a-half-year deal with his former club Maccabi Tel Aviv two days later.

Medunjanin helped Maccabi to qualify for the Europa League group stage in both his first and second seasons, following runner-up finishes in the Premier League.

=== Philadelphia Union ===
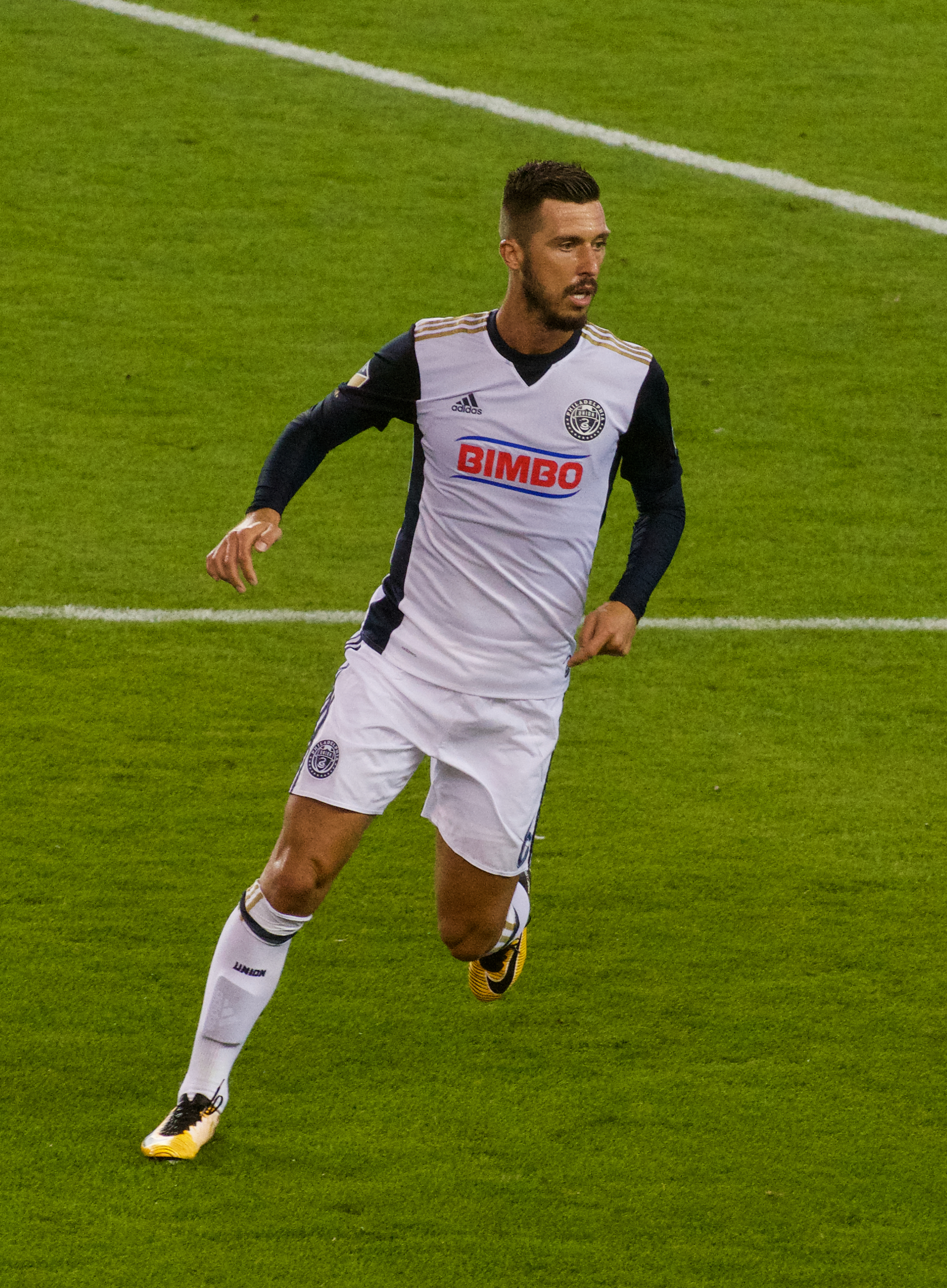
Medunjanin playing for Philadelphia Union in 2017

On 31 January 2017, Major League Soccer club Philadelphia Union signed Medunjanin to a two-year deal with an option for a third. He made his debut in the season opener, in a 0–0 away draw against the Vancouver Whitecaps FC. He scored his first goal for his new team on 14 May 2017, contributing to a 4–0 victory at D.C. United; on 27 November, he was named their Player of the Year after contributing 12 assists and two goals.

Becoming one of the Union's core midfielders, Medunjanin's contract option was picked up for the 2019 campaign. He helped the side earn their best season to date by playing every minute in the league, also leading all MLS players in total passes (2,571), total completed passes (2,182), passes in the opponent's half (1,521) and completed passes in the opponent's half (1,217) according to Opta.

On 20 November 2019, Medunjanin was released. During the MLS waiver draft, his rights were selected by FC Cincinnati.

=== FC Cincinnati ===
On 5 December 2019, aged 34, Mendunjanin joined FC Cincinnati. He scored his first goal for his new team the following 19 September, with a game-winning olympic corner kick against the New York Red Bulls.

Medunjanin left the TQL Stadium in August 2022, by mutual consent.

=== Later career ===
On 9 August 2022, Medunjanin returned to the Netherlands after 14 years, on a one-year contract at PEC Zwolle. In July 2023 he moved countries again, with the 38-year-old signing a one-year deal with Spanish Primera Federación club CD Castellón.

After retiring, and having achieved promotion to Segunda División by scoring nine goals, Medunjanin remained at his last team as assistant manager under Dick Schreuder; the pair had first met while the former was still a player at Philadelphia Union.

== International career ==
=== Netherlands ===
Medunjanin was part of the Netherlands under-21 team that won the 2006 tournament of the UEFA European Championship. He was also called by coach Foppe de Haan for his squad in the 2007 tournament, held in the Netherlands; the nation went on to retain its title by beating Serbia 4–1 in the final, and in the process qualify for the 2008 Olympic Games in Beijing.

=== Bosnia and Herzegovina ===
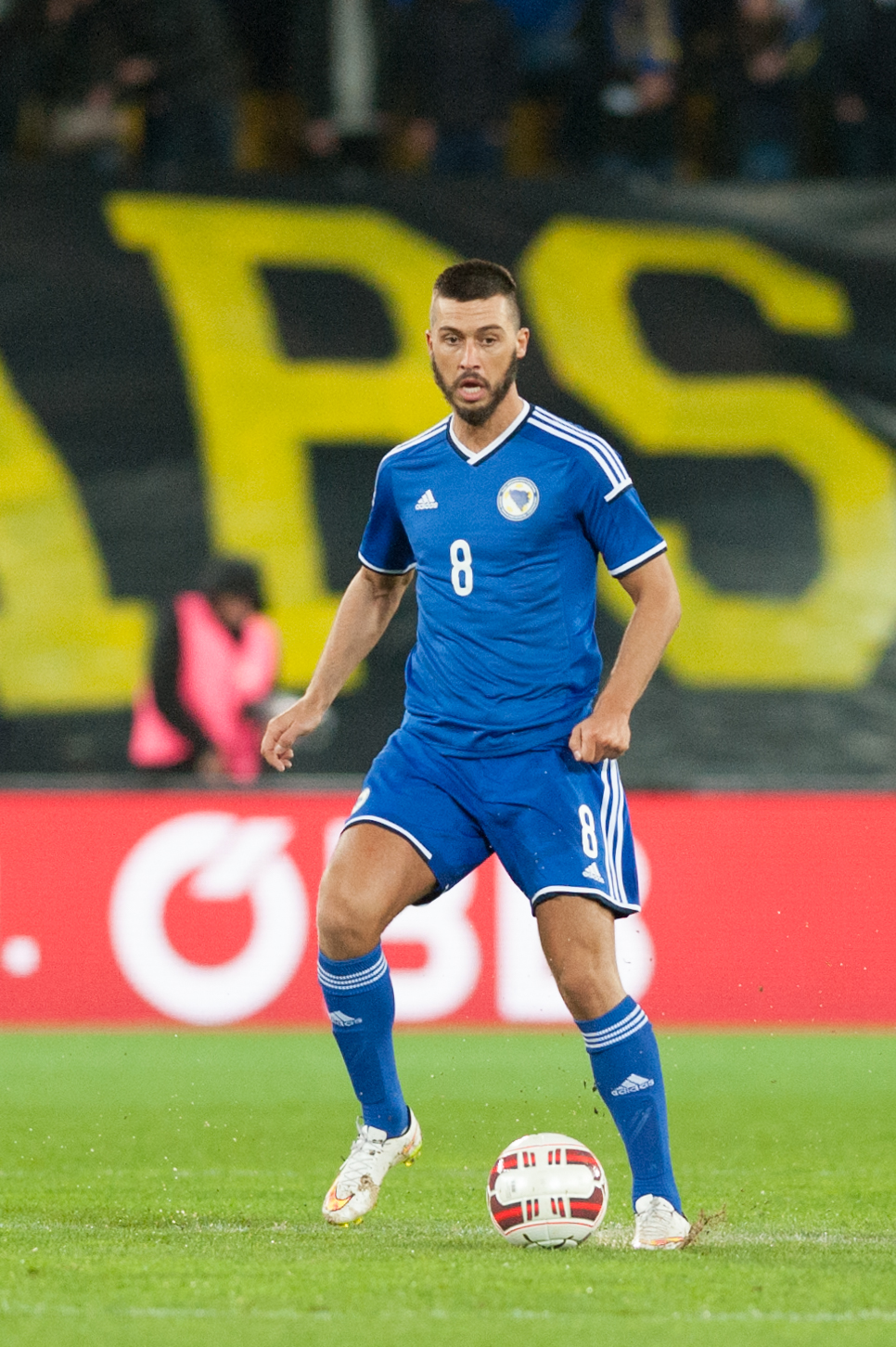
Medunjanin playing for Bosnia and Herzegovina in 2015

In a 2009 interview, Medunjanin expressed strong desire to play for his native Bosnia and Herzegovina. In August of the same year, his paperwork for change of footballing citizenship was submitted to FIFA and, on 31 October 2009, national coach Miroslav Blažević invited the player for the 2010 FIFA World Cup playoff games against Portugal. He made his debut – as a starter – in the decisive second leg, a 0–1 loss in Zenica (0–2 on aggregate).

Medunjanin scored his first international goal on 17 November 2010, in a friendly with Slovakia. In the UEFA Euro 2012 qualifying campaign, he contributed three goals against Albania (2–0, home), Belarus (2–0, away) and Luxembourg (5–0 at home), helping Bosnia to the second place in their group and to qualify for play-offs.

On 2 June 2014, Medunjanin was named in the squad for 2014 FIFA World Cup. He made his debut in the tournament 14 days later, playing the last 16 minutes of a 2–1 group stage loss to Argentina.

On 13 October 2015, Medunjanin scored a crucial brace against Cyprus to help Bosnia and Herzegovina reach the Euro 2016 play-offs after the 3–2 away win. In 2016, he captained the nation during the Kirin Cup winning campaign, the first match being against Denmark on 3 June.

Medunjanin announced his retirement from international football on 27 March 2018, after playing in a friendly with Senegal which marked his 60th cap.

== Personal life ==
After the outbreak of Bosnian War in 1992, Medunjanin moved to the Netherlands at the age of seven with his mother and sister, whilst his father was unable to leave, later losing his life. Due to living in the latter country he possessed dual citizenship, Bosnian and Dutch.

In July 2019, Medunjanin married Israeli model Moran Rahimi.

== Career statistics ==
=== Club ===
As of match played 7 November 2021

Appearances and goals by club, season and competition
Club	Season	League			Cup		Continental		Other		Total	
Club	Season	Division	Apps	Goals	Apps	Goals	Apps	Goals	Apps	Goals	Apps	Goals
AZ	2004–05	Eredivisie	3	0	0	0	0	0	—		3	0
AZ	2005–06	Eredivisie	10	3	2	0	2 (Note: Appearances in UEFA Europa League)	0	1 (Note: Appearance in 2005–06 Eredivisie Europa League play-offs)	0	15	3
AZ	2007–08	Eredivisie	12	1	1	0	2	0	—		15	1
AZ	Total		25	4	3	0	4	0	1	0	33	4
Sparta Rotterdam (loan)	2006–07	Eredivisie	32	7	3	2	—		2 (Note: Appearances in 2006–07 Eredivisie play-offs for UEFA Europa League)	0	37	9
Valladolid	2008–09	La Liga	18	1	3	1	—		—		21	2
Valladolid	2009–10	La Liga	24	5	1	0	—		—		25	5
Valladolid	Total		42	6	4	1	—		—		46	7
Maccabi Tel Aviv	2010–11	Israeli Premier League	32	8	4	1	6	4	—		42	13
Maccabi Tel Aviv	2011–12	Israeli Premier League	14	1	3	2	9	1	—		26	4
Maccabi Tel Aviv	Total		46	9	7	3	15	5	—		68	17
Gaziantepspor (loan)	2012–13	Süper Lig	30	4	3	0	—		—		33	4
Gaziantepspor	2013–14	Süper Lig	32	2	1	0	—		—		33	2
Deportivo La Coruña	2014–15	La Liga	24	2	1	0	—		—		25	2
Deportivo La Coruña	2015–16	La Liga	0	0	2	0	—		—		2	0
Deportivo La Coruña	Total		24	2	3	0	—		—		27	2
Maccabi Tel Aviv	2015–16	Israeli Premier League	15	3	4	1	—		—		19	4
Maccabi Tel Aviv	2016–17	Israeli Premier League	18	1	2	0	14	2	—		34	3
Maccabi Tel Aviv	Total		33	4	6	1	14	2	—		53	7
Philadelphia Union	2017	Major League Soccer	34	2	2	0	—		—		36	2
Philadelphia Union	2018	Major League Soccer	30	2	5	1	—		—		35	3
Philadelphia Union	2019	Major League Soccer	34	1	1	0	—		2 (Note: Appearances in MLS Cup playoffs)	0	37	1
Philadelphia Union	Total		98	5	8	1	—		2	0	108	6
FC Cincinnati	2020	Major League Soccer	22	1	0	0	—		—		22	1
FC Cincinnati	2021	Major League Soccer	29	3	0	0	—		—		29	3
FC Cincinnati	Total		51	4	0	0	—		—		51	4
Career total			413	47	38	8	33	7	5	0	489	62

=== International ===
Appearances and goals by national team and year
National team	Year	Apps	Goals
Bosnia and Herzegovina	2009	1	0
Bosnia and Herzegovina	2010	6	1
Bosnia and Herzegovina	2011	11	3
Bosnia and Herzegovina	2012	6	0
Bosnia and Herzegovina	2013	9	1
Bosnia and Herzegovina	2014	9	0
Bosnia and Herzegovina	2015	6	2
Bosnia and Herzegovina	2016	6	1
Bosnia and Herzegovina	2017	2	1
Bosnia and Herzegovina	2018	4	0
Total		60	9

Scores and results list Bosnia and Herzegovina's goal tally first, score column indicates score after each Medunjanin goal.

List of international goals scored by Haris Medunjanin
No.	Date	Venue	Opponent	Score	Result	Competition
1	17 November 2010	Štadión Pasienky, Bratislava, Slovakia	Slovakia	1–1	3–2	Friendly
2	7 June 2011	Bilino Polje, Zenica, Bosnia and Herzegovina	Albania	1–0	2–0	UEFA Euro 2012 qualifying
3	2 September 2011	Dinamo Stadium, Minsk, Belarus	Belarus	2–0	2–0	UEFA Euro 2012 qualifying
4	7 October 2011	Bilino Polje, Zenica, Bosnia and Herzegovina	Luxembourg	5–0	5–0	UEFA Euro 2012 qualifying
5	7 June 2013	Skonto Stadium, Riga, Latvia	Latvia	3–0	5–0	2014 FIFA World Cup qualification
6	13 October 2015	GSP Stadium, Nicosia, Cyprus	Cyprus	1–0	3–2	UEFA Euro 2016 qualifying
7	13 October 2015	GSP Stadium, Nicosia, Cyprus	Cyprus	2−2	3–2	UEFA Euro 2016 qualifying
8	6 September 2016	Bilino Polje, Zenica, Bosnia and Herzegovina	Estonia	3–0	5–0	2018 FIFA World Cup qualification
9	7 October 2017	Grbavica, Sarajevo, Bosnia and Herzegovina	Belgium	1–1	3–4	2018 FIFA World Cup qualification

== Honours ==
Netherlands U21

- UEFA European Under-21 Championship: 2006, 2007

Individual

- Philadelphia Union Player of the Year: 2017
