= Andwélé Slory =

Dutch former professional footballer (born 1982)

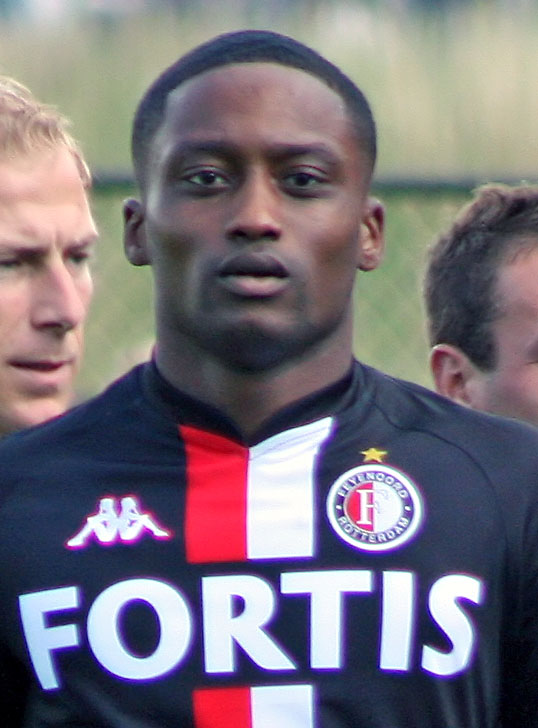

Personal information
- Full name: Andwélé Cedric Slory
- Date of birth: 27 September 1982 (age 44)
- Place of birth: Paramaribo, Suriname
- Height: 1.70 m (5 ft 7 in)
- Position: Right winger

Youth career
- ODIN '59
- Stormvogels
- Telstar

Senior career*
Years	Team	Apps	(Gls)
2000–2005	Stormvogels Telstar (Note: Stormvogels Telstar was known as Telstar until 2001.)	77	(21)
2005–2007	Excelsior	65	(26)
2007–2010	Feyenoord	50	(7)
2010	West Bromwich Albion	6	(0)
2010	Levski Sofia	5	(0)
2011	Adelaide United	11	(0)
2013	BVV Barendrecht		
2014	VDL Maassluis		
2015	Dordrecht	5	(0)
Total		214	(54)

International career^{‡}
2007	Netherlands	2	(0)
- * Club domestic league appearances and goals as of 23 May 2015 (UTC) ‡ National team caps and goals as of 6 June 2007

Andwélé Cedric Slory (born 27 September 1982) is a Dutch former professional footballer. He played as a right winger.

After his professional debut for Stormvogels Telstar at the age of 18, Slory promoted to the Eredivisie with his next club Excelsior. In the Eredivisie, Slory had an impressive season with Excelsior. Slory became the club's top scorer with 12 goals, made his debut in the Netherlands national football team and earned a transfer to Feyenoord. Due to injuries, Slory had a difficult start at Feyenoord, but became a first team regular in the season 2009–10. Later he played in England, Bulgaria and Australia, then retired from playing professionally for three years until he joined FC Dordrecht in 2015, where he retired once again after six months.

Slory has also played for the Netherlands national football team.

== Early life ==
Slory was born in Paramaribo, Suriname, where he lived until he was seven years old. Slory's father is a former player of the Surinamese football club S.V. Robinhood and the Suriname national football team, where he played as an attacking midfielder. Slory left Suriname when his mother started to study in the Netherlands.

In the Netherlands Slory first lived in Zaandam, North Holland. After two months the family moved to Heemskerk, North Holland. When Slory was in the Netherlands for almost a year, a friend of his mother signed him up for his first amateur football club.

== Club career ==
=== Youth career ===
Slory started his youth career at local Heemskerk club ODIN '59. Soon he joined Stormvogels, a regional club with teams playing on the highest national youth levels. Eventually he got the option to join a professional side. The Dutch Eerste Divisie clubs AZ and Telstar, both based in North Holland, were interested in the youngster. Slory decided to play for Telstar. Main reason for his decision was the fact there were already friends of him playing for the club from Velsen.

At the age of 15, Slory was almost sent away from the club. Mainly thanks to his coach, Toon Gerrits, the youngster changed positively: "I had an evaluation talk with Toon Gerrits. We had a good talk and after that my development went sky high. I still thank him for that."

=== Stormvogels Telstar (2000–2005) ===
==== First steps (2000–2003) ====
Slory joined Telstar's first team squad in the season 2000–01, but did not play a single match for the first team. In 2001, Telstar merged with Slory's previous amateur club, Stormvogels, which resulted in a name change; Stormvogels Telstar.

At the age of 18, Slory made his professional debut in the Dutch Eerste Divisie on 18 August 2001. Slory replaced Orlando Smeekes in the 73rd minute of the home match against Excelsior (1–3). On 4 November 2001, Slory was named in the starting line-up of the home match against HFC Haarlem (0–1) for the first and only time of the season. Slory played nine matches in his first season, without scoring any goals. After a promising debut season, Slory had a disappointing follow-up season. In the season 2002–03, Slory only made two appearances in the club's first team.

==== Breakthrough (2003–2005) ====
Slory had his breakthrough in the season 2003–04. On 5 September 2003, Slory scored his first professional goals in the home match win against Heracles Almelo (2–1). After replacing Luciano van Kallen in the 44th minute, Slory scored both goals for Stormvogels Telstar. Slory played 35 Eerste Divisie matches for Stormvogels Telstar, in which he scored 12 goals.

Slory slowly grew out to be an important player for the club from Velsen. In the season 2004–05, Slory played 31 league matches, scoring 9 goals. As Slory's ambition went beyond the club's, Slory was ready for a new challenge. On 21 February 2005, Excelsior announced the transfer of the 22 years old winger. Slory signed a two-year deal with the third club of Rotterdam. Feyenoord was also part of the agreement, as the Eredivisie club had the first option on the player.

=== Excelsior (2005–2007) ===
==== Unexpected promotion (2005–2006) ====
At Excelsior, Slory quickly became a first team regular and had a successful 2005–06 season. On 12 September 2005, Slory made his Excelsior debut in the away match against Cambuur Leeuwarden (0–1). One week later, on 19 September 2005, Slory scored his first goal for Excelsior in the home match against FC Emmen (3–0).

Under the management of Mario Been, Excelsior unexpectedly battled for the Eerste Divisie championship. On 31 March 2006, Excelsior won the home match against championship favorite VVV-Venlo (3–1), securing the Eerste Divisie 2005–06 title. Slory scored the equalizer and played an important role in Excelsior's Eredivisie promotion, by scoring 14 goals in 36 matches.

==== Relegation battle (2006–2007) ====
After Excelsior's surprise promotion, the Rotterdam club was an almost certain relegation candidate for the season 2006–07. The club had the lowest Eredivisie budget and only few players with Eredivisie experience. However, Slory impressed in the early weeks of the season, scoring five goals in the first ten matches and also had four assists to his name. Slory made his Eredivisie debut on 19 August 2006, in the home match against Roda JC (0–1). Slory scored his first goal on the highest level one week later on 26 August 2006, in the away match against RKC Waalwijk (1–1).

Due to Slory's impressive start of the season, the winger was watched by scouts from various domestic and foreign clubs. However, on 27 October 2006, Feyenood prompted to confirm they were using their option to sign the youngster in the summer. On 21 December 2006, it was announced Slory would join Feyenoord at the end of the season, signing a two-year deal.

Slory continued his impressive run at Excelsior by scoring goals in important matches, including the 1–1 equalizer in the away match against his new club's arch rivals Ajax (2–2). The winger also scored in the home trashing against Heracles Almelo (6–1) and twice in the away match against ADO Den Haag (2–2), both clubs also fighting against relegation. On 29 April 2007, the last Eredivisie match day, Excelsior played against Eredivisie leader AZ. Slory's excellent dribble in the 20th minute caused AZ goalkeeper Boy Waterman to make a foul. The goalkeeper got sent off and Excelsior received a penalty kick, which was finished by Luigi Bruins. Excelsior eventually won the match 3–2, which caused AZ to lose the Eredivisie title to PSV.

Excelsior finished the Eredivisie on a 16th place, which meant they had to compete in the promotion/relegation playoffs. After wins against BV Veendam, with two goals from Slory in the second leg, and RBC Roosendaal, with Slory scoring the winning goal in the second leg, Excelsior remained in the top tier.

=== Feyenoord (2007–2010) ===
==== False start (2007–2009) ====
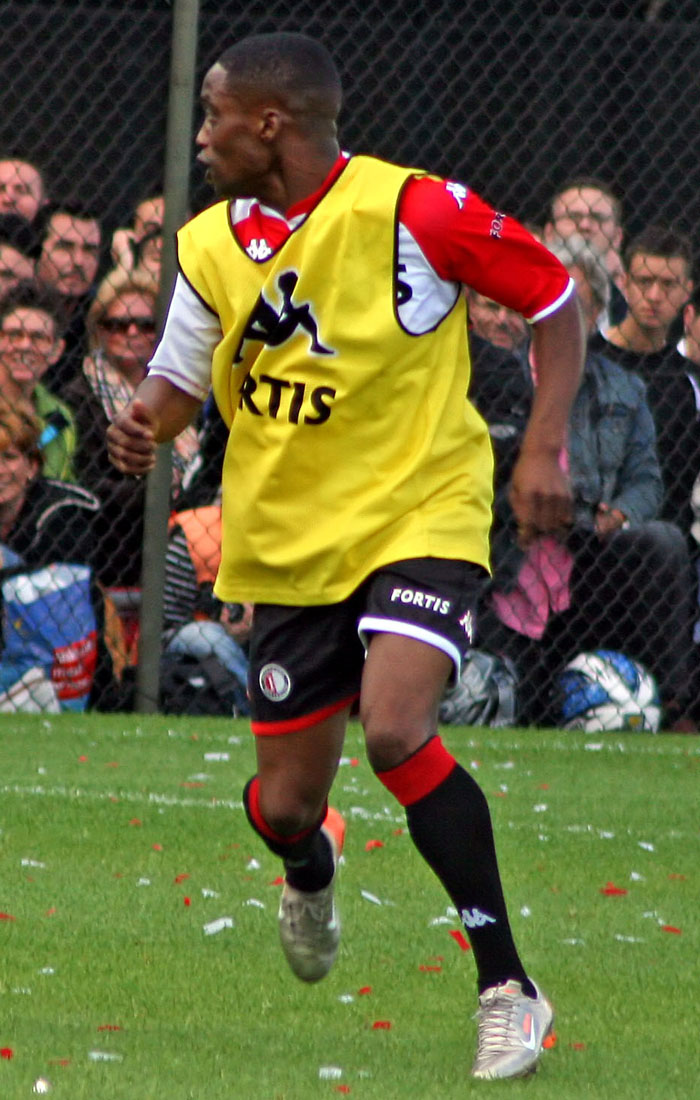
Slory at Feyenoord's first training of the season 2007–08.

Slory's 2007–08 season initially started on 15 June 2007. Before even playing a single minute for Feyenoord, arch rivals Ajax made an offer on the new Feyenoord winger. However, Slory remained at Feyenoord as new Feyenoord coach Bert van Marwijk refused any cooperation.

On 19 August 2007, Slory made an unlucky debut for Feyenoord in the Eredivisie season opening match. Slory was part of Feyenoord's starting line-up in the away match against FC Utrecht (0–3), but collided with opposing goalkeeper Franck Grandel after 17 minutes. The winger broke a metatarsal bone and was sidelined for almost two months. While Slory was recovering from his injury, Feyenoord decided to offer Slory a new contract. On 4 October 2007, Feyenoord extended Slory's contract with a year. Slory's new contract ends summer 2010, with an option for another year.

Slory returned on the pitch on 11 November 2007, in the Klassieker, Feyenoord's home match against Ajax (2–2). Slory came in as a substitute in the 69th minute, but missed two immense opportunities to score face to face with Ajax goalkeeper Maarten Stekelenburg in extra time. As a result of the heavy rivalry between the two sides, a threatening note was delivered at Slory's home address after the match: "You better score the third opportunity, otherwise you must move!". Slory reported the threat to the police. On 2 December 2007, Slory scored his first Eredivisie goal for Feyenoord in the home match against Heracles Almelo (6–0).

Due to injuries and personal difficulties, Slory only played 17 matches in his first Feyenoord season. The same problems haunted the player in the season 2008–09. Slory already missed the complete pre-season program due to a hamstring injury, while he strained a muscle in his other leg in his first Eredivisie match of the season, causing Slory to be out for another six weeks. Slory appeared in 20 Eredivisie matches, scoring only one goal.

==== Last chance (2009–2010) ====
For the season 2009–10, former Excelsior coach Mario Been returned on Slory's path, as he was appointed as the new Feyenoord coach. After two disappointing seasons full of injuries, it was Slory's last chance at the club from Rotterdam. However, Slory had a controversial start of the season. On 17 July 2009, Slory was involved in a fight with teammate Karim El Ahmadi on a pre-season training in Óbidos, Portugal. The day after the fight, Slory apologized in front of all his teammates and technical staff.

During the start of the season, Slory quickly became a first team regular. With four goals in thirteen matches, the right winger performed well above expectation. Despite the good start of the season, minor incidents continued to occur and Slory slowly lost his place within the first eleven. On 25 October 2009, Slory was substituted during half time in Feyenoord's home match against VVV-Venlo (1–0) due to disciplinary reasons after arguing with Feyenoord midfielder Denny Landzaat. On 22 November 2009, Slory was fined for signing autographs at a school in Barendrecht, while he was reportedly ill and unable to attend the club's training session. Combined with Slory's expiring contract, the player was free to join a new club during the winter transfer period.

=== West Bromwich Albion (2010) ===
On 1 February 2010 he signed for English Championship side West Bromwich Albion on a free transfer. Slory made his debut for West Brom, coming on as 52nd-minute substitute in their 3–2 away win at Blackpool on 3 February 2010. Slory made his home debut for the Baggies in a 2–0 win over Scunthorpe United on 9 February.

He made his first start of the season on 16 February in a 1–1 draw with Cardiff City away. Slory made 6 league appearances for West Bromwich Albion during the 2009/10 season with only one start and the rest coming off the bench.

On 5 May 2010 he was released by West Bromwich Albion who decided against adding to the wingers 5-month contract

=== Levski Sofia ===
On 30 August 2010, Slory arrived in Bulgaria and on the next day (31 August 2010), Slory officially signed his contract, after successfully passing the medical tests. The contract is for 2 years. Slory did not succeed in establishing himself as first choice in the Sofia team's line-up and eventually cancelled his contract with the Bulgarian side.

=== Adelaide United ===
On 20 December 2010, it was announced that Slory had signed as a guest player for A-league side Adelaide United, a contract which allows him to make a maximum of 10 appearances for the club. However, he is ineligible to play until the international transfer window opens in January. Adelaide United has also left the door open for the possibility of Slory staying on beyond the end of the 2010/11 A-League season. Slory recently revealed to the media that he has extended his contract to the end of the 2011/12 season but it is yet unknown if it is definite. On 2 February 2011, Slory made his first official appearance for the team.

Due to a heated disagreement with manager Rini Coolen, it was claimed that Slory would walk away from United. Coolen, who dropped Slory for the Round 7 match against Wellington Phoenix at Eden Park was said to have done so because of the row. It is believed that Slory would also "walk away from the game" and retire from professional football, due to the row. Adelaide United confirmed the reports that Slory intended to retire from football on 22 November 2011. Slory claims he has lost the passion and commitment to football, and hopes to return to the Netherlands and start up a business.

=== Return to Netherlands ===
Slory returned to Netherlands and played with amateur clubs BVV Barendrecht and VDL Maassluis, while completing his coaching course. More than 3 years after he last playing professionally, he signed an 18-month professional contract with Eredivisie club FC Dordrecht in January 2015, after having trained with the club since August 2014. On 10 April, Slory was demoted to the reserves alongside Mart Lieder and Jordy van Deelen by head coach Jan Everse.

== International career ==
Slory was born in Suriname, a former Dutch territory, and was eligible to represent either the Surinam national team or the Netherlands national team, he chose to represent the Netherlands like many other Surinamese born footballers such as Edgar Davids, Clarence Seedorf and Jimmy Hasselbaink.

As a result of his excellent performance at Excelsior in the Eredivisie season 2006–07, Slory received an invitation by the Netherlands coach Marco van Basten. Slory joined the Netherlands national team on their trip through Asia in the summer of 2007.

Slory played two matches for the Netherlands. On 2 June 2007, Slory made his international debut in the friendly match against South Korea in Seoul (0–2). After a foul on Slory, the Netherlands received a penalty kick in the 32nd minute of game, which was scored by Rafael van der Vaart. Slory played his second and last match for the Netherlands on 6 June 2007, as the Netherlands beat Thailand in Bangkok (1–3).

== Personal life ==
His son is Netherlands youth international and Feyenoord player Jaden Slory.

== Career statistics ==
=== Club ===
Appearances and goals by club, season and competition
Club	Season	League			Cup (Note: Includes KNVB Cup, FA Cup and Bulgarian Cup)		Continental		Total	
Club	Season	Division	Apps	Goals	Apps	Goals	Apps	Goals	Apps	Goals
Stormvogels Telstar	2000–01	Eerste Divisie	0	0	0	0	—		0	0
Stormvogels Telstar	2001–02	Eerste Divisie	9	0	0	0	—		9	0
Stormvogels Telstar	2002–03	Eerste Divisie	2	0	0	0	—		2	0
Stormvogels Telstar	2003–04	Eerste Divisie	35	12	0	0	—		35	12
Stormvogels Telstar	2004–05	Eerste Divisie	31	9	0	0	—		31	9
Stormvogels Telstar	Total		77	21	0	0	0	0	77	21
Excelsior	2005–06	Eerste Divisie	36	14	2	0	—		38	14
Excelsior	2006–07	Eredivisie	29	12	1	1	—		30	13
Excelsior	Total		65	26	3	1	0	0	68	27
Feyenoord	2007–08	Eredivisie	17	2	0	0	—		17	2
Feyenoord	2008–09	Eredivisie	20	1	0	0	1	0	21	1
Feyenoord	2009–10	Eredivisie	13	4	1	0	—		14	4
Feyenoord	Total		50	7	1	0	1	0	52	7
West Bromwich Albion	2009–10	Championship	6	0	0	0	—		6	0
PFC Levski Sofia	2010–11	A Group	5	0	0	0	—		5	0
Adelaide United	2010–11	A-League	0	0	0	0	—		0	0
FC Dordrecht	2014–15	Eredivisie	5	0	0	0	—		5	0
Career total			211	54	4	1	1	0	216	55

=== International ===
Appearances and goals by national team and year
National team	Year	Apps	Goals
Netherlands	2007	2	0
Total		2	0

== Honours ==
Excelsior

- Eerste Divisie: 2005–06

Feyenoord

- KNVB Cup: 2007–08

== Trivia ==
- When Feyenoord won the KNVB Cup 2007-08, Slory refused to hold the trophy, as he did not play a single minute in a KNVB Cup match that season.
