= Rini Coolen =

Dutch footballer and manager

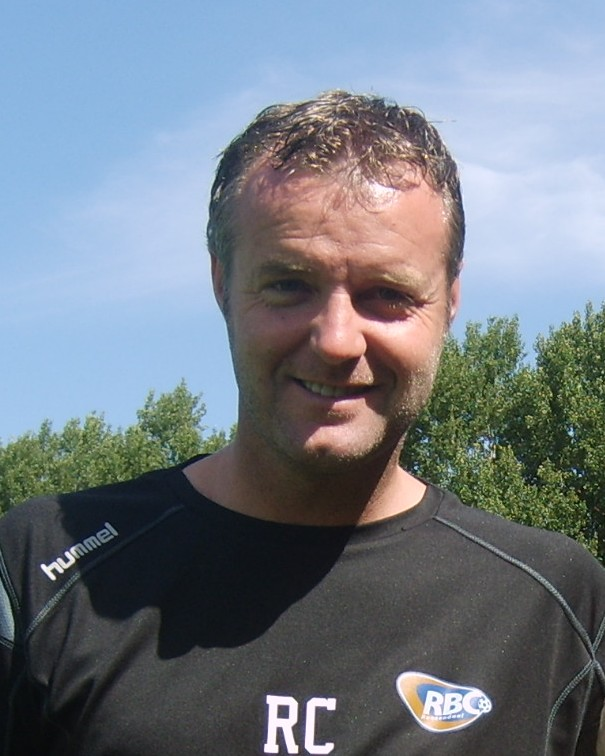

Personal information
- Full name: Marinus Johannes Coolen
- Date of birth: 10 February 1967 (age 59)
- Place of birth: Arnhem, Netherlands
- Position: Defender

Team information
- Current team: N.E.C. (dir. of football)

Senior career*
Years	Team	Apps	(Gls)
1985–1988	Go Ahead Eagles	64	(1)
1988–1994	Heracles	148	(6)
1989–1990	→ De Graafschap (loan)	3	(0)
1994–1995	AZ	23	(0)
Total		238	(7)

Managerial career
- 1996–1999: Heracles (assistant coach)
- 1999–2002: Twente Reserves
- 2002–2004: Twente (assistant coach)
- 2004–2006: Twente
- 2006–2007: AGOVV
- 2008–2010: RBC
- 2010–2011: Adelaide United
- 2015: Aruba
- 2018: Rosenborg (interim)
- 2020–2021: Feyenoord U21
- 2021–2024: Feyenoord Academy
- 2025-: N.E.C. (dir. football)
- * Club domestic league appearances and goals

Rini Coolen (born 10 February 1967) is a Dutch retired football defender and currently the director of football at Eredivisie side N.E.C..

== Club career ==
Coolen played professionally for Go Ahead Eagles, Heracles, De Graafschap and AZ.

== Managerial career ==
He retired in 1995 and became a football manager who worked for Heracles Almelo, Twente and AGOVV Apeldoorn. He left Twente by mutual agreement on 1 February 2006. In November 2008, he signed for RBC Roosendaal as the successor of released coach Rob Meppelink. In 2010, he was appointed manager of A-League club Adelaide United.

His inaugural season with Adelaide United proved to be a success, taking the club from their disastrous last place finish in the 2009–10 season to third place in the 2010–11 season. His time at the club was marred with off-field dramas, most notably surrounding former Reds captain Travis Dodd who moved to Perth Glory. Coolen proposed a plan to the club and started rebuilding the team after being signed to a four-year contract.

Coolen released several players including Travis Dodd, Paul Reid, Adam Hughes and Lucas Pantelis. Imports brought in by Coolen such as Evgeniy Levchenko, Ricardo Da Silva and Andwele Slory failed to make an impact. After a poor start to the 2011/2012 season, it was announced on 18 December 2011, that Coolen would be replaced by former Adelaide United coach John Kosmina. He was supposed to stay at the club as the youth team coach, however on 21 December 2011, it was announced that he had left the club. Coolen took the club to court for breaching his four-year contract and was awarded $400,000 in an out-of-court settlement.

In 2015, he was coach of the Aruba national football team for six weeks.

In August 2016, Coolen left his post as Academy boss at PEC Zwolle to join Fred Rutten as his assistant at Al Shabab in Dubai.

On 19 July 2018, Coolen was appointed as interim manager of Rosenborg.

On 11 June 2020, Feyenoord announced that Coolen had signed a two-year contract with the club to become the coach of the club's new Under-21 team from the 2020–2021 season. On 21 May 2021, Feyenoord announced that Coolen would become the new head of the club's youth academy. On 21 October 2023, Feyenoord announced that at the end of the 2023-24 season Coolen would leave the club, due to differing views on vision. In summer 2025, Coolen was appointed director of football at N.E.C..

== Honours ==
Rosenborg

- Eliteserien: 2018
- Norwegian Cup: 2018

== Statistics ==
As of 13 December 2018

Team	Nat	From	To	Record							
Team	Nat	From	To	G	W	D	L	GF	GA	GD	Win %
Adelaide United	(Australia)	5 July 2010	18 December 2011	50	21	10	19	70	62	+8	42.00
Rosenborg (Interim)	(Norway)	19 July 2018	31 December 2018	29	16	6	7	46	33	+13	55.17
Total				79	37	16	26	118	95	+23	46.84
