= Arjan Wisse =

Dutch footballer (born 1985)

Personal information
- Date of birth: 10 June 1985 (age 41)
- Place of birth: Den Helder, Netherlands
- Height: 1.91 m (6 ft 3 in)
- Position: Forward

Youth career
- AZ

Senior career*
Years	Team	Apps	(Gls)
2003–2006	AZ	6	(1)
2005–2006	→ Telstar (loan)	26	(4)
- VIOS-W
Total		32	(5)

International career
- Netherlands U17
- Netherlands U19
- Netherlands U20
- * Club domestic league appearances and goals

Arjan Wisse (born 10 June 1985) is a Dutch former professional footballer who played as a forward.

== Club career ==
Born in Den Helder, Wisse played professionally for AZ and Telstar. Prior to signing on loan for Telstar in May 2005, he was close to signing for Sparta.

He was due to be loaned to HFC Haarlem for the 2006–07 season, but the deal collapsed after Wisse missed two medical examinations. Wisse then had trials with Belgian club Sint-Truiden in June 2007, and English club Darlington in July 2007. He retired from professional football in 2007.

After two years without a club, he was linked back with Haarlem for the 2008–09 season. He later played for amateur club VIOS-W, retiring in January 2015 due to lack of motivation. He also played futsal for SZVV.

== International career ==
Wisse represented the Netherlands at under-17, under-19, and under-20 levels, and played for them at the 2005 FIFA World Youth Championship.
