= Dick Voorn =

Dutch football coach (born 1948)

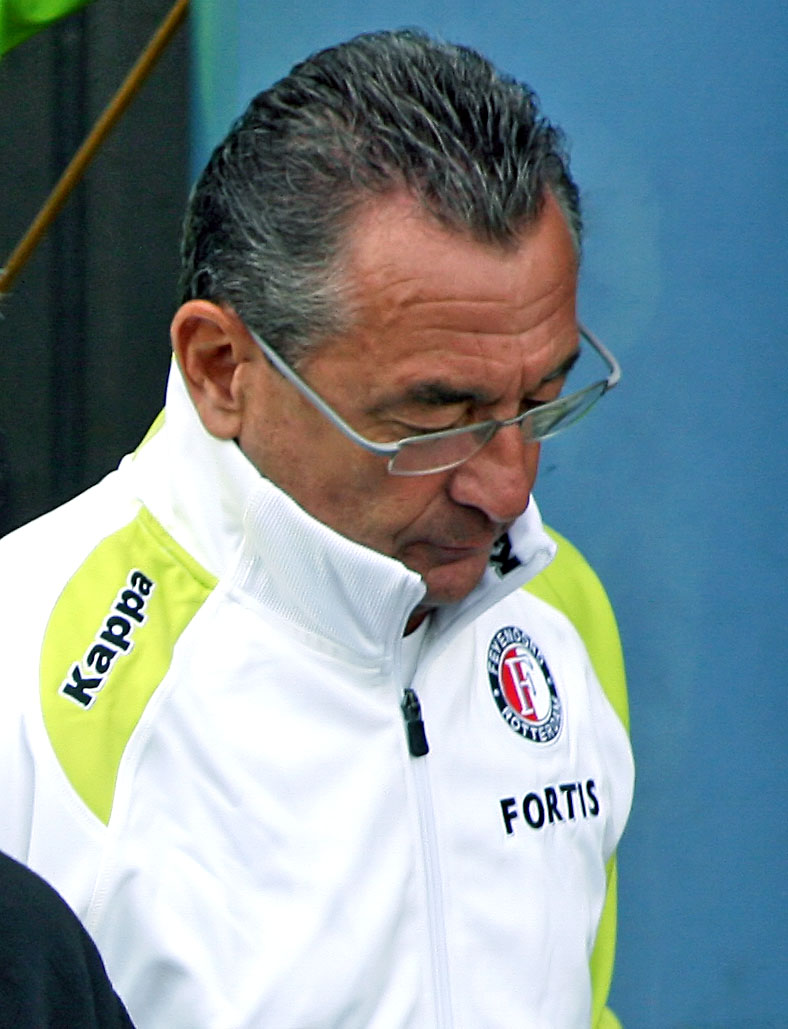

Personal information
- Date of birth: 30 October 1948 (age 77)
- Place of birth: Uithoorn, North Holland, Netherlands
- Height: 1.78 m (5 ft 10 in)

Team information
- Current team: RKSV Bekkerveld

Managerial career
- Years: Team
- RKSV Bekkerveld

Dick "Cookie" Voorn (born 30 October 1948) is a Dutch football coach. Until recently he was one of the assistant managers at the Netherlands national team.

Voorn was born in Uithoorn, North Holland. He made his first steps in professional football in the 1990s when he became assistant manager at Fortuna Sittard where he worked alongside Bert van Marwijk. The two, as well as rehabilitation coach Egid Kiesouw became close friends and a dynamic trio. Together they brought Fortuna Sittard into the 1999 KNVB Cup final.

Van Marwijk left Fortuna and moved to Feyenoord Rotterdam where he would win the UEFA Cup. After that success he went to the Bundesliga to manage the team Feyenoord beat in the UEFA Cup final, Borussia Dortmund. Van Marwijk appointed his own staff and both Kiesouw and Voorn were appointed. The financial situation at the club was tough and the trio did all they could to get the best out of the team. They succeeded, although they were unable to earn any prizes. When Van Marwijk and Dortmund split up during the 2006-07 season Voorn and Kiesouw remained at the club until the end of the season.

During the summer break Van Marwijk returned to Feyenoord and technical director Peter Bosz let him appoint his own staff, which meant Voorn and Kiesouw re-joined Van Marwijk in his mission to bring Feyenoord back to the top.
