= Denny Landzaat =

Dutch footballer (born 1976)

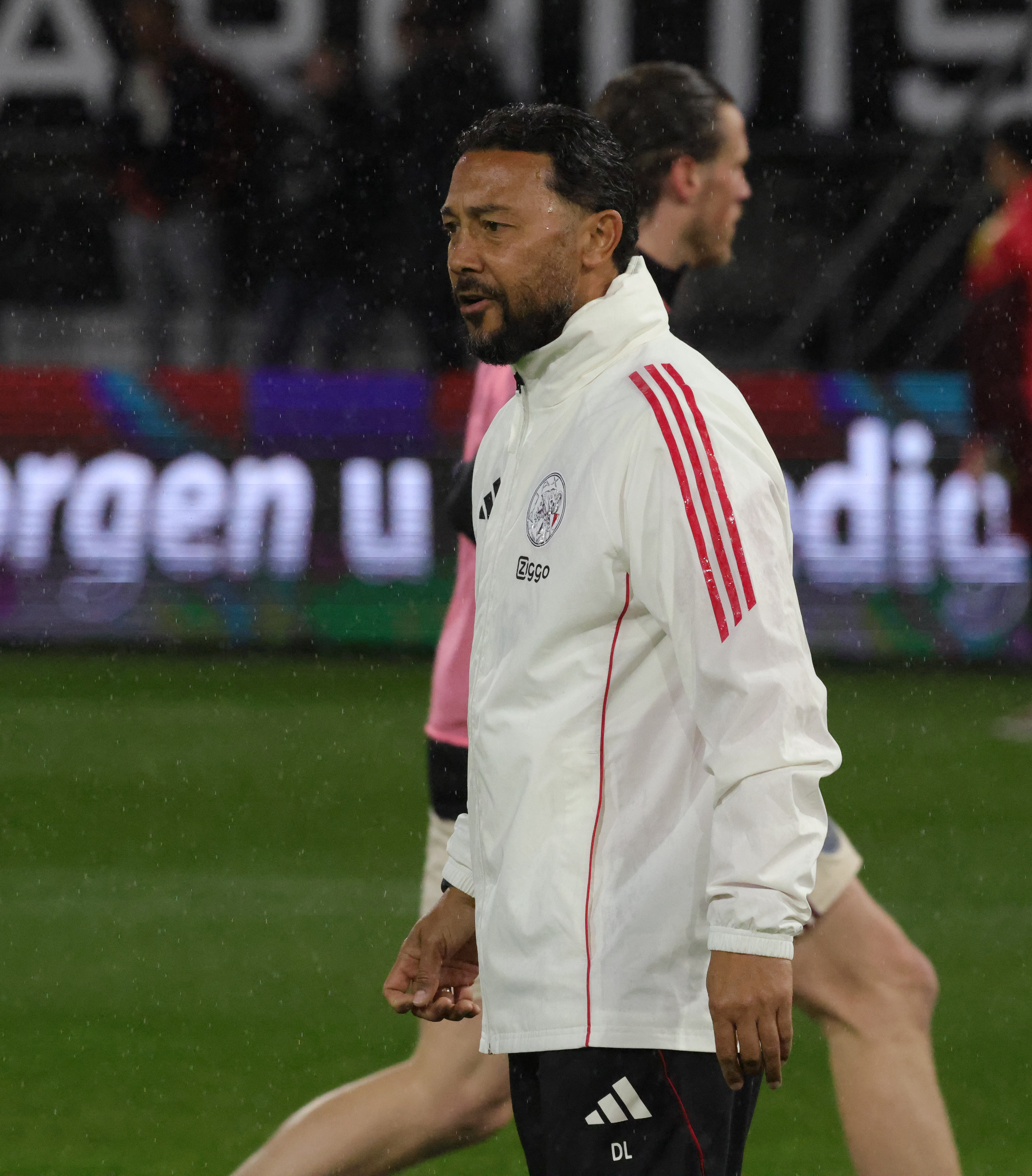
- Landzaat as assistant coach of Ajax in 2026

Personal information
- Full name: Denny Domingues Landzaat
- Date of birth: 6 May 1976 (age 50)
- Place of birth: Amsterdam, Netherlands
- Height: 1.78 m (5 ft 10 in)
- Position: Midfielder

Youth career
- Buitenveldert
- Ajax

Senior career*
Years	Team	Apps	(Gls)
1995–1996	Ajax	1	(0)
1996–1999	MVV	102	(10)
1999–2003	Willem II	139	(38)
2003–2006	AZ	79	(22)
2006–2008	Wigan Athletic	52	(5)
2008–2010	Feyenoord	38	(5)
2010–2013	Twente	50	(2)
2014	Willem II	9	(0)
Total		461	(82)

International career
2001–2008	Netherlands	38	(1)

Managerial career
- 2015–2016: Jong AZ (assistant)
- 2016: AZ (U15)
- 2016–2017: AZ (U17)
- 2017–2018: Jong AZ (assistant)
- 2018–2019: Feyenoord (assistant)
- 2019–2020: Al-Ittihad (assistant)
- 2021–2022: Willem II (assistant)
- 2022: Al-Taawoun (assistant)
- 2022–2023: Lech Poznań (assistant)
- 2024: Ferencváros (assistant)
- 2025: Indonesia (assistant)
- 2025–: Ajax (assistant)
- * Club domestic league appearances and goals

Denny Domingues Landzaat (born 6 May 1976) is a Dutch former professional footballer and coach who is currently an assistant coach for Eredivisie club Ajax. Throughout his playing career, he mostly played as a midfielder.

== Club career ==
=== Early career ===
Landzaat was educated in Ajax's youth academy, but only played one league match for the club before moving on to have lengthy spells with MVV, Willem II and AZ. He was AZ's captain in the 2005–06 season, as they finished second in the Eredivisie.

=== Wigan Athletic ===
Landzaat joined Premier League club Wigan Athletic on 18 July 2006 for an undisclosed fee, thought to be £2.5 million. He signed a three-year contract with the club. He scored his first goal for Wigan against Reading in a 2–3 loss on 30 January 2007. He followed this with a 30-yard strike at the Emirates Stadium in a 1–2 defeat to Arsenal on 11 February. On 18 August 2007, Landzaat converted a penalty against Sunderland to score his first home goal for Wigan at the JJB Stadium. He also scored the first goal in Wigan's 5–3 win over local rivals Blackburn Rovers.

=== Feyenoord ===
On 25 January 2008, Landzaat returned to the Netherlands to join Feyenoord for a £1 million transfer fee. He signed a three-and-a-half-year contract with the club. He scored his first goal for Feyenoord on his debut, in the 3–3 draw against Heracles on 24 February 2008.

=== Twente ===
After his contract with Feyenoord expired, Landzaat signed a one-year deal with Twente in August 2010, which was extended during the season and again in the following season. He won the KNVB Cup in 2010–11.

=== Willem II ===
After his contract with Twente expired in the summer of 2013, Landzaat was unable to find a new team for the start of the 2013–14 season. However, on 16 January 2014, he signed a contract with Willem II until the end of the season. He retired from professional football at the end of the season, having been a part of the team that helped Willem II back to the Eredivisie.

== International career ==
Landzaat was a member of the Dutch squad at the 1995 FIFA World Youth Championship. Landzaat also competed in the 2006 World Cup. On 21 May 2008, Landzaat was released from Marco van Basten's UEFA Euro 2008 provisional squad.

== Coaching career ==
Landzaat ended his career in the summer 2014 and then signed a contract with AZ Alkmaar until 2017 as an individual coach for the first team and for Jong AZ. One year later, he was also appointed assistant manager to Martin Haar for Jong AZ.

From January 2016, he became manager of AZ's U15 team but still retained his coaching role for the Jong and first team's and also as assistant manager for Jong AZ. In the summer 2016, he then took charge of the club's U17 squad and beside that, he also functioned as assistant manager under Danny Blind for the Netherlands national football team in an advisor role. In the summer 2017, he signed a new one-year contract and was appointed assistant manager for Jong AZ, once again under Martin Haar.

In the 2018–19 season, Landzaat was appointed assistant to Giovanni van Bronckhorst. Jaap Stam was appointed manager for Feyenoord in the summer 2019. When Stam stepped down on 28 October 2019, Landzaat also did. One week later, he was appointed assistant manager of Henk ten Cate at Saudi Professional League club Al-Ittihad.

On 19 June 2022, he was announced as the assistant manager under John van den Brom at Polish Ekstraklasa defending champions Lech Poznań. On 18 December 2023, one day after van den Brom's dismissal, Landzaat left the club by mutual consent.

On 8 January 2025, Landzaat was appointed as an assistant coach for the Indonesia national team under Patrick Kluivert.

== Personal life ==
Landzaat was born and raised in Amsterdam. He is of Indonesian descent through his Moluccan mother.

== Career statistics ==
=== Club ===
Appearances and goals by club, season and competition
Club	Season	League			Cup (Note: Includes KNVB Cup, FA Cup.)		Continental		Other		Total	
Club	Season	Division	Apps	Goals	Apps	Goals	Apps	Goals	Apps	Goals	Apps	Goals
Ajax	1995–96	Eredivisie	1	0	0	0	1	0	0	0	2	0
MVV	1996–97	Eerste Divisie	34	2	0	0	–		–		34	2
MVV	1997–98	Eredivisie	34	4	1	0	–		–		35	4
MVV	1998–99	Eredivisie	34	4	2	1	–		–		36	5
MVV	Total		102	10	3	1	0	0	0	0	105	11
Willem II	1999–2000	Eredivisie	25	3	1	1	3	0	–		29	4
Willem II	2000–01	Eredivisie	33	12	3	0	–		–		36	12
Willem II	2001–02	Eredivisie	34	16	3	2	–		–		37	18
Willem II	2002–03	Eredivisie	34	5	2	0	6	1	–		42	6
Willem II	2003–04	Eredivisie	13	2	3	2	2	1	–		18	5
Willem II	Total		139	38	12	5	11	2	0	0	162	45
AZ Alkmaar	2003–04	Eredivisie	17	3	0	0	–		–		17	3
AZ Alkmaar	2004–05	Eredivisie	33	10	1	1	13	4	–		47	15
AZ Alkmaar	2005–06	Eredivisie	29	9	3	2	8	1	2	0	42	12
AZ Alkmaar	Total		79	22	4	3	21	5	2	0	106	30
Wigan Athletic	2006–07	Premier League	33	2	1	0	–		–		34	2
Wigan Athletic	2007–08	Premier League	19	3	0	0	–		–		19	3
Wigan Athletic	Total		52	5	1	0	–		–		53	5
Feyenoord	2007–08	Eredivisie	11	2	3	2	–		–		14	4
Feyenoord	2008–09	Eredivisie	7	1	0	0	0	0	3	0	10	1
Feyenoord	2009–10	Eredivisie	20	2	7	0	–		–		27	2
Feyenoord	Total		38	5	10	2	0	0	3	0	51	7
Twente	2010–11	Eredivisie	27	2	5	0	12	2	–		44	4
Twente	2011–12	Eredivisie	16	0	2	0	9	1	2	0	29	1
Twente	2012–13	Eredivisie	7	0	0	0	0	0	0	0	7	0
Twente	Total		50	2	7	0	21	3	2	0	80	5
Willem II	2013–14	Eerste Divisie	9	0	0	0	–		–		9	0
Career total			470	82	37	11	54	10	7	0	568	103

=== International ===
Score and result list the Netherlands' goal tally first, score column indicates score after Landzaat goal.

International goal scored by Denny Landzaat
No.	Date	Venue	Opponent	Score	Result	Competition
1	3 September 2004	Stadion Galgenwaard, Utrecht, Netherlands	Liechtenstein	3–0	3–0	Friendly

== Honours ==
Ajax

- Eredivisie: 1995–96

MVV

- Eerste Divisie: 1996–97

Feyenoord

- KNVB Cup: 2007–08

Twente

- KNVB Cup: 2010–11
- Johan Cruyff Shield: 2010

Willem II

- Eerste Divisie: 2013–14
