= Muslu Nalbantoğlu =

Dutch footballer

Personal information
- Full name: Muslu Nalbantoğlu
- Date of birth: 24 November 1983 (age 42)
- Place of birth: Amersfoort, Netherlands
- Height: 1.74 m (5 ft 9 in)
- Position: Right-back

Youth career
- –1994: APWC
- 1994–2000: Ajax
- 2000–2001: Elinkwijk
- 2001–2004: NEC

Senior career*
Years	Team	Apps	(Gls)
2005–2008	NEC	107	(1)
2008	Kayserispor	0	(0)
2009–2012	De Graafschap	76	(4)
2012–2013	FC Oss	28	(2)
2013	Orduspor		
2014	Go-Ahead Kampen		
2014–2018	AFC Quick 1890		
2018–2024	APWC		
2024–2025	VVZ '49		
Total		211	(7)
- * Club domestic league appearances and goals

Muslu Nalbantoğlu (born 24 November 1983) is a Dutch former professional footballer who plays as a right-back.

== Career ==
Nalbantoğlu was born in Amersfoort. He made his debut in professional football, being part of the NEC Nijmegen squad in the 2004–05 season. In the 2008–09 season, he transferred to his native country and joined Kayserispor. He was released on 28 October 2008.

In January 2009, he was offered a contract until June 2010 after training with De Graafschap. In the decisive game of the 2009–10 Eerste Divisie season, Nalbantoğlu scored the winning goal in the 3–2 comeback win over Go Ahead Eagles which secured De Graafschap the Eerste Divisie title and promotion to the Eredivisie.

In August 2012, he signed a one-year deal with FC Oss, which was playing in the Eerste Divisie.

On 2 July 2013, Nalbantoğlu signed a two-year contract Orduspor in Turkey. In August, only one month later, he had his contract terminated. On 1 February 2014, Go-Ahead Kampen announced that they had signed Nalbantoğlu. That same day, Nalbantoğlu made his debut against VV Berkum in the Saturday Hoofdklasse C. In June 2014, he moved to AFC Quick 1890. Since 2018, Nalbantoğlu has been playing for his childhood club APWC.

== Honours ==
De Graafschap

- Eerste Divisie: 2009–10
