= Jacob Lensky =

Footballer (born 1988)

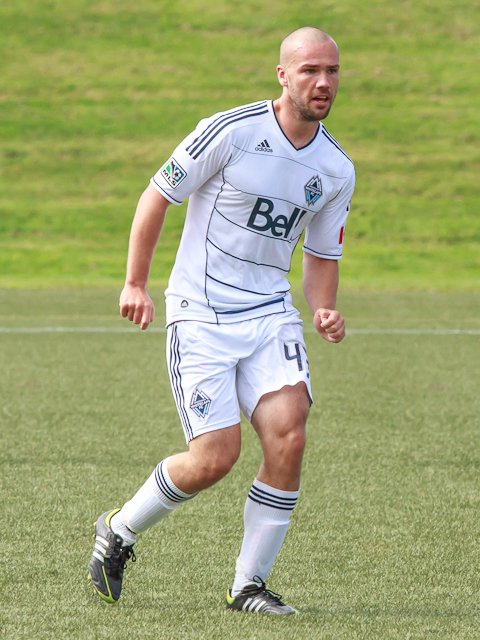
- Lensky in 2012

Personal information
- Full name: Jacob Lensky
- Date of birth: December 16, 1988 (age 37)
- Place of birth: Vancouver, British Columbia, Canada
- Position: Midfielder

Youth career
- Anderlecht
- Sparta Prague
- Slavia Prague
- Blackburn Rovers
- 2004–2007: Celtic

Senior career*
Years	Team	Apps	(Gls)
2007–2008	Feyenoord	1	(0)
2009–2011	Utrecht	55	(4)

International career^{‡}
2006	Canada U20	2	(0)
2008	Canada U23	2	(0)
2010–2011	Czech Republic U21	3	(0)
- * Club domestic league appearances and goals as of May 1, 2011 ‡ National team caps and goals as of 13:15, April 11, 2013 (UTC)

Jacob Lensky (born December 16, 1988) is a professional soccer player who plays as a midfielder. Born in Canada, he has represented Canada and the Czech Republic internationally at youth levels.

== Club career ==
=== Youth career ===
Lensky was born in Vancouver, British Columbia and attended Vancouver College. His early soccer career was spent throughout Europe - in Belgium with Anderlecht, in the Czech Republic with Sparta Prague and Slavia Prague, in England with Blackburn Rovers and Scotland with Celtic.

=== Professional career ===
In September 2006, Lensky signed a pre-contract agreement with Dutch side Feyenoord, effective from January 1, 2007. He made his Eredivisie debut for Feyenoord on February 11, 2007, against Twente.

Lensky announced his retirement from professional soccer in August 2008, before training with the Vancouver Whitecaps in January 2009. Lensky was also offered a trial with Seattle Sounders FC of Major League Soccer, but he declined.

Lensky returned to professional football in September 2009, when he signed a one-year deal with Dutch side Utrecht staying there until late 2011, when he returned to Canada.

He was on trial with Whitecaps FC of MLS until he was released on February 12, 2013.

== International career ==
=== Canada ===
Lensky was involved with Canada's unsuccessful attempt to qualify for the 2008 Summer Olympics. He played in games against Mexico and Haiti.

=== Czech Republic ===
Lensky was a member of the Czech Republic U-21 team and made his debut on March 3, 2010, against Finland. He made his competitive debut on August 11, 2010, against San Marino.
