= Ricardo Da Silva =

Portuguese-born Australian footballer

Personal information
- Full name: Ricardo Farinha Da Silva
- Date of birth: 29 October 1983 (age 42)
- Place of birth: Torres Vedras, Portugal
- Position: Attacking midfielder

Team information
- Current team: Adelaide Blue Eagles

Senior career*
Years	Team	Apps	(Gls)
2005–2007	Torreense		
2007	Adelaide Galaxy	18	(4)
2008	Adelaide Blue Eagles	18	(2)
2009–2011	Adelaide City	52	(23)
2009	→ White City (loan)	8	(1)
2011–2012	Adelaide United	5	(0)
2012–2013	Adelaide City	18	(6)
2013–2017	West Adelaide	104	(47)
2017–2019	Adelaide Olympic	55	(11)
2019	White City	0	(0)
2020–2022	West Adelaide	67	(25)
2023	Adelaide Croatia Raiders	0	(0)
2023–	Adelaide Blue Eagles	0	(0)

Managerial career
- 2019: White City (assistant manager)
- * Club domestic league appearances and goals

Ricardo da Silva (born 29 October 1983) is a Portuguese-born Australian footballer. He currently plays as an attacking midfielder for South Australian club Adelaide Blue Eagles.

== Club career ==
In 2005, Da Silva signed with Portuguese football club Torreense. He remained at the club until 2007, when he decided to move back to Australia due to family reasons. Since returning to Adelaide he played for a number of South Australian Super League clubs including Adelaide Galaxy, Adelaide Blue Eagles and Adelaide City, where he scored 23 goals over three seasons.

=== Adelaide United ===
On 22 September 2011, it was officially announced that Adelaide United had signed Da Silva on a one-year contract.

On 19 November 2011, Ricardo Da Silva made his debut for Adelaide United against Wellington Phoenix in Auckland. The game ended in a 1–1 draw.

== Personal ==
Da Silva moved to Adelaide, Australia, in 2003, and studied as an international high school student for two years.
