= 2005–06 Feyenoord season =

Feyenoord
2005–06 season
- Chairman: Jorien van den Herik
- Head coach: Erwin Koeman
- Stadium: De Kuip
- Eredivisie: 3rd
- KNVB Cup: Round of 16
- UEFA Cup: First round
- Top goalscorer: League: Dirk Kuyt (22); All: Dirk Kuyt (25)

The 2005–06 season was the 98th season in the existence of Feyenoord, a professional football club based in Rotterdam, Netherlands. It was their 50th consecutive season in the Eredivisie, the top flight of Dutch football. The team was under the management of Erwin Koeman, who head been appointed head coach ahead of the season, replacing Ruud Gullit.

== Season summary ==
Feyenoord were the highest-scoring side in the Eredivisie and improved on the previous season's results to finish third, though they remained well behind the title contenders. They were eliminated in the opening rounds of both the domestic cup and the UEFA Cup. In the Eredivisie's UEFA play-offs for Champions League qualification they were defeated at the first stage, losing 7–2 on aggregate to an Ajax team that had finished 11 points behind them in the league.

== Kits ==
Feyenoord's kits were manufactured by Italian company Kappa and sponsored by Belgian financial company Fortis.

== First-team squad ==
Squad at end of season

Note: Flags indicate national team as defined under FIFA eligibility rules; some limited exceptions apply. Players may hold more than one non-FIFA nationality.

No.	Pos.	Nation	Player
1	GK	NED	Maikel Aerts
4	DF	BRA	André Bahia
5	DF	NED	Pascal Bosschaart
7	FW	NED	Dirk Kuyt
9	FW	NED	Pierre van Hooijdonk
10	MF	NED	Nicky Hofs
14	MF	CHI	Sebastián Pardo
15	DF	DEN	Patrick Mtiliga
16	MF	NED	Alfred Schreuder
17	DF	NED	Patrick Paauwe
18	DF	NED	Serginho Greene
19	FW	MAR	Ali Boussaboun

No.	Pos.	Nation	Player
20	DF	NED	Ron Vlaar
21	FW	CIV	Salomon Kalou
28	MF	NED	Romeo Castelen (Note: Castelen was born in Paramaribo, Suriname, but also qualified to represent the Netherlands internationally and made his international debut for the Netherlands in August 2004.)
29	MF	NED	Tim Vincken
30	GK	NED	Patrick Lodewijks
32	GK	EGY	Sherif Ekramy
33	MF	CAN	Jonathan de Guzmán (Note: De Guzmán was born in Scarborough, Canada, but would later become qualified to represent the Netherlands internationally after gaining citizenship in 2008 and would make his international debut for the Netherlands in January 2013.)
34	DF	GHA	Christian Gyan
35	MF	NED	Diego Biseswar
36	DF	BUL	Ivan Bandalovski (on loan from Litex Lovech)
37	DF	NED	Royston Drenthe
39	DF	BEL	Pieter Collen

=== Left club during season ===
Note: Flags indicate national team as defined under FIFA eligibility rules; some limited exceptions apply. Players may hold more than one non-FIFA nationality.

No.	Pos.	Nation	Player
2	DF	SWE	Alexander Östlund (to Southampton)
3	DF	TUN	Karim Saidi (on loan to Lecce)
6	MF	EGY	Hossam Ghaly (to Tottenham Hotspur)
8	MF	JPN	Shinji Ono (to Urawa Red Diamonds)
9	FW	SCG	Danko Lazović (on loan to Bayer Leverkusen and Partizan Belgrade)
20	MF	BRA	Leonardo (to NAC Breda)

No.	Pos.	Nation	Player
23	DF	NED	Ferne Snoyl (on loan to Aberdeen)
24	MF	NED	Edwin de Graaf (on loan to ADO Den Haag)
25	DF	USA	Cory Gibbs (on loan to ADO Den Haag)
26	FW	NGR	John Owoeri (on loan to Westerlo)
27	DF	BEL	Timothy Derijck (on loan to NAC Breda)
31	DF	NED	Gianni Zuiverloon (on loan to RKC Waalwijk)

== Results ==
=== Eredivisie ===
Pos	Team	Pld	W	D	L	GF	GA	GD	Pts	Qualification or relegation
1	PSV (C)	34	26	6	2	71	23	+48	84	Qualification to Champions League group stage
2	AZ	34	23	5	6	78	32	+46	74	Qualification to Champions League third qualifying round playoff
3	Feyenoord	34	21	8	5	79	34	+45	71	Qualification to Champions League third qualifying round playoff
4	Ajax (Note: Ajax won the 2005–06 KNVB Cup)	34	18	6	10	66	41	+25	60	Qualification to Champions League third qualifying round playoff
5	Groningen	34	16	8	10	46	43	+3	56	Qualification to Champions League third qualifying round playoff

Rules for classification: 1) points; 2) goal difference; 3) number of goals scored.
(C) Champions
Notes:

14 August 2005 1	Feyenoord	2 – 0	NAC	Rotterdam
14:30 CEST	Pardo 24'; Kuyt 71'	report	Zwaanswijk (yellow card) 44'	Stadium: De Kuip; Attendance: 42.000; Referee: Temmink

21 August 2005 2	Sparta	1 – 3	Feyenoord	Rotterdam
12:30 CEST	van den Bergh 20'; de Fauw (yellow card) 51'; Michels (yellow card) 89'	report	Paauwe (yellow card) 4'; Pardo (yellow card) 37' (goal) 53'; Ghaly (yellow card) 38' (goal) 57'; Kuyt 45'	Stadium: Het Kasteel; Attendance: 11.000; Referee: Vink

28 August 2005 3	Ajax	1 – 2	Feyenoord	Amsterdam
12:30 CEST	Grygera (yellow card) 11'; Charisteas 79'; Trabelsi (yellow card) 81'	report	Kalou 16'; Kuyt 47'; Snoyl (yellow card) 71' (yellow-red card); Paauwe (yellow card) 84'	Stadium: Amsterdam Arena; Attendance: 49.567; Referee: van Egmond

11 September 2005 4	Feyenoord	3 – 0	NEC	Rotterdam
14:30 CEST	Ghaly (yellow card) 23'; Kalou 36'; Pardo 72'; Östlund (yellow card) 78'; Castelen 90'	report	Tininho (yellow card) 19'	Stadium: De Kuip; Attendance: 35.000; Referee: Braamhaar

18 September 2005 5	Feyenoord	5 – 1	Heerenveen	Rotterdam
14:30 CEST	Lodewijks (yellow card) 20'; Kuyt 56', 73'; Bahia 67'; Paauwe 76'; Kalou 90' (pen.)	report	Yildirim 12'; Bosvelt (yellow card) 35'; Huntelaar (red card) 61'; Waterman (yellow card) 90'	Stadium: De Kuip; Attendance: 36.000; Referee: van Dongen

25 September 2005 6	FC Twente	1 – 3	Feyenoord	Enschede
12:30 CEST	Zomer 85'	report	Castelen 26', 46'; Kuyt 90'	Stadium: Arke Stadion; Attendance: 13.250; Referee: Luinge

2 October 2005 7	FC Twente	3 – 1	Feyenoord	Utrecht
12:30 CEST	Nelisse 7', 49', 51'; Tiendalli (yellow card) 44' (red card) 65'; de Jong (yellow card) 72'	report	Keller 26' (o.g.); Ono (yellow card) 43'; Bosschaart (yellow card) 47'; Castelen (yellow card) 58'; Greene (yellow card) 61'; Paauwe (yellow card) 64'	Stadium: Stadion Galgenwaard; Attendance: 20.041; Referee: Vink

16 October 2005 8	Feyenoord	4 – 1	FC Groningen	Rotterdam
14:30 CEST	Boussaboun 53'; Greene (yellow card) 59'; Kuyt 66'; Kalou 72'; Ghaly 89'	report	Silva 9'; Kruiswijk (yellow card) 22'; Roorda (yellow card) 50'; Cornelisse (yellow card) 64'; Florén (yellow card) 84'; Waterman (yellow card) 90'	Stadium: De Kuip; Attendance: 40.000; Referee: Bossen

23 October 2005 9	RKC Waalwijk	2 – 1	Feyenoord	Waalwijk
14:30 CEST	Martens 33'; Texeira 90'	report	Castelen 78'	Stadium: Mandemakers Stadion; Attendance: 7.000; Referee: Gumienny (Belgium)

30 October 2005 10	Willem II	1 – 3	Feyenoord	Tilburg
14:30 CEST	Agustien (yellow card) 62'; Fehér (yellow card) 68'; Denissen 90'	report	de Guzman 9'; Castelen 21'; Paauwe 61'	Stadium: Koning Willem II Stadion; Attendance: 13.500; Referee: Temmink

6 November 2005 11	Feyenoord	0 – 0	Vitesse	Rotterdam
14:30 CEST	de Guzmán (yellow card) 5'	report	Yakubu (yellow card) 14'; Vreven (yellow card) 85'	Stadium: De Kuip; Attendance: 40.000; Referee: Luinge

20 November 2005 12	Roda JC	2 – 3	Feyenoord	Kerkrade
12:30 CEST	Sergio 28'; Oper 44'; Senden (yellow card) 78'; Kah (yellow card) 81' (yellow-red card); van Dijk (yellow card) 88'	report	Boussaboun (yellow card) 7'; Kuyt 25'; Bahia 33'; Paauwe (yellow card) 43'; Biseswar 79'	Stadium: Parkstad Limburg Stadion; Attendance: 16.000; Referee: van Egmond

27 November 2005 13	Feyenoord	7 – 1	Heracles	Rotterdam
14:30 CEST	Boussaboun 9', 59'; Greene 19'; Kalou 35'; Kuyt 78', 83'; Östlund (yellow card) 86'; de Guzmán 90'	report	Jansen 87'	Stadium: De Kuip; Attendance: 40.000; Referee: Blom

3 December 2005 14	RBC Roosendaal	2 – 2	Feyenoord	Roosendaal
19:30 CEST	Kpaka 2'; Loran 16'; de Lange (yellow card) 32'; Fleur (yellow card) 54'	report	Pardo 21'; de Guzmán 73'; Östlund (yellow card) 60'	Stadium: RBC Stadion; Attendance: 4.500; Referee: Braamhaar

11 December 2005 15	Feyenoord	1 – 0	PSV	Rotterdam
12:30 CEST	Kuyt 7'; Boussaboun (yellow card) 15'	report	Ooijer (yellow card) 18'; Lamey (yellow card) 73'	Stadium: De Kuip; Attendance: 45.000; Referee: Bossen

18 December 2005 16	ADO Den Haag	2 – 1	Feyenoord	The Hague
12:30 CEST	den Ouden 2' (pen.); Saavreda 79'	report	Kalou 68'	Stadium: Zuiderpark Stadion; Attendance: 8.633; Referee: Luinge

26 December 2005 17	Feyenoord	2 – 0	AZ	Rotterdam
12:30 CEST	Paauwe 3' (yellow card) 48'; de Guzmán 8'; Ghaly (yellow card) 43'	report	Perez (yellow card) 13'; de Zeeuw (yellow card) 17'; Landzaat (yellow card) 34'	Stadium: De Kuip; Attendance: 47.000; Referee: Vink

29 December 2005 18	Feyenoord	6 – 1	Willem II	Rotterdam
20:00 CEST	Östlund (yellow card) 33'; Kuyt 45', 75', 79'; Pardo 50'; Kalou 61', 69'	report	Smit (yellow card) 12'; van Nieuwstadt (yellow card) 24'; Reuser (yellow card) 35' (goal) 67'	Stadium: De Kuip; Attendance: 47.000; Referee: van Sichem

15 January 2006 19	Vitesse	0 – 1	Feyenoord	Arnhem
12:30 CEST	Knol (yellow card) 36'	report	Bahia 28'	Stadium: Gelredome; Attendance: 23.200; Referee: van Egmond

22 January 2006 20	Feyenoord	0 – 0	Roda JC	Rotterdam
14:30 CEST	Bosschaart (yellow card) 38'	report	Kah (yellow card) 9'; Cziommer (yellow card) 20'; Lachambre (yellow card) 52'	Stadium: De Kuip; Attendance: 39.000; Referee: Luinge

29 January 2006 21	Heracles	0 – 4	Feyenoord	Almelo
16:30 CEST	Maas (yellow card) 66'; de Vries (yellow card) 77'	report	Kalou 25'; Kuyt 36'; Castelen 39'; Paauwe 75'	Stadium: Polman Stadion; Attendance: 8.500; Referee: Wiedemeijer

5 February 2006 22	Feyenoord	3 – 2	Ajax	Rotterdam
12:30 CEST	Hofs 21' (yellow card) 37'; Castelen 45'; Kuyt 48'; Greene (yellow card) 65'	report	Rosenberg 23'; Lindenbergh (yellow card) 29'; Grygera (yellow card) 49'; Huntelaar 90'	Stadium: De Kuip; Attendance: 45.000; Referee: Temmink

8 February 2006 23	NEC	1 – 2	Feyenoord	Nijmegen
20:00 CEST	van der Doelen (yellow card) 36'; Niedzielan (yellow card) 39'; Denneboom 57'; Barreto (yellow card) 74'	report	Bosschaart (yellow card) 43'; Wisgerhof 83' (o.g.); Kuyt 90'	Stadium: De Goffert; Attendance: 12.500; Referee: van Hulten

12 February 2006 24	NAC	3 – 3	Feyenoord	Breda
14:30 CEST	Diba 24', 90'; Stam (yellow card) 29'; Jenner 89'	report	Kalou 7', 35'; Castelen 71'	Stadium: Rat Verlegh Stadion; Attendance: 16.385; Referee: Vink

19 February 2006 25	Feyenoord	4 – 0	Sparta	Rotterdam
12:30 CEST	Hofs 28', 37'; Kuyt 52'; Boussaboun 88'	report		Stadium: De Kuip; Attendance: 44.000; Referee: Luinge

26 February 2006 26	FC Groningen	1 – 1	Feyenoord	Groningen
16:30 CEST	Luirink (yellow card) 7'; Fledderus 12'; Cornelisse (yellow card) 20'; van de Laak (yellow card) 37'; Salmon (yellow card) 44'; van der Linden (yellow card) 53'	report	Paauwe (yellow card) 44'; van Hooijdonk 71'	Stadium: Euroborg; Attendance: 19.776; Referee: Jol

5 March 2006 27	Feyenoord	3 – 0	FC Utrecht	Rotterdam
12:30 CEST	Hofs (yellow card) 18'; Kalou 41', 90'; Kuyt 49'	report	Tiendalli (yellow card) 16'; van Steensel (yellow card) 19'; Braafheid (yellow card) 42'; Shew-Atjon (yellow card) 84' (yellow-red card)	Stadium: De Kuip; Attendance: 35.000; Referee: Wiedemeijer

12 March 2006 28	Feyenoord	1 – 1	RKC Waalwijk	Rotterdam
14:30 CEST	van Diemen 34' (o.g.); Vlaar (yellow card) 78'	report	Berger 87'	Stadium: De Kuip; Attendance: 44.000; Referee: Temmink

19 March 2006 29	AZ	1 – 0	Feyenoord	Alkmaar
12:30 CEST	Arveladze 58'; Mathijsen (yellow card) 68'	report	Hofs (yellow card) 12'; Greene (yellow card) 27'; Kuyt (yellow card) 79'	Stadium: Alkmaarderhout; Attendance: 8.845; Referee: van Egmond

26 March 2006 30	Feyenoord	0 – 2	ADO Den Haag	Rotterdam
12:30 CEST	Bosschaart (yellow card) 33'	report	de Graaf (yellow card) 34'; Kolkka 37', 67'; El Akchaoui (yellow card) 46'	Stadium: De Kuip; Attendance: 41.000; Referee: Bossen

2 April 2006 31	Feyenoord	4 – 2	FC Twente	Rotterdam
14:30 CEST	Kalou 6', 65'; Kuyt 23' (pen.), 61'	report	Zomer (yellow card) 22'; Gerritsen 25'; N'Kufo (yellow card) 34' (goal) 39'; Brama (yellow card) 44'; Ouédraogo (yellow card) 45'	Stadium: De Kuip; Attendance: 37.500; Referee: Wiedemeijer

7 April 2006 32	Heerenveen	1 – 1	Feyenoord	Heerenveen
20:30 CEST	Breuer (yellow card) 21'; Tarvajärvi 49'; Bruggink (yellow card) 66'	report	Bahia (yellow card) 32'; van Hooijdonk 79'	Stadium: Abe Lenstra Stadion; Attendance: 21.000; Referee: Haverkort

12 April 2006 33	PSV	1 – 1	Feyenoord	Eindhoven
20:00 CEST	Cocu 70'	report	Castelen 51'	Stadium: Philips Stadion; Attendance: 34.300; Referee: Bossen

16 April 2006 34	Feyenoord	2 – 0	RBC Roosendaal	Rotterdam
14:30 CEST	Hofs (yellow card) 68'; Kuyt 71' (pen.); van Hooijdonk 83'	report	Acuña (yellow card) 50'; Fortes Rodríguez (red card) 69'	Stadium: De Kuip; Attendance: 42.000; Referee: Blom

=== Play-offs Eredivisie Champions League Qualification ===
20 April 2006 1st Round	Ajax	3 – 0	Feyenoord	Amsterdam
20:15 CEST	Rosales 27'; Pienaar (red card) 71'; Heitinga 79' (yellow card) 82'; Huntelaar 80'	report	Bahia (yellow card) 61' (yellow-red card); Vlaar (yellow card) 83'; Castelen (red card) 87'	Stadium: Amsterdam Arena; Attendance: 34.364; Referee: Braamhaar

23 April 2006 1st Round	Feyenoord	2 – 4	Ajax	Rotterdam
12:30 CEST	Collen (yellow card) 15'; van Hooijdonk (yellow card) 35'; Kuyt 59', 87'	report	Rosales 34'; Huntelaar 40'; Boukhari 51'; Rosenberg (yellow card) 54'; Mitea 81'	Stadium: De Kuip; Attendance: 30.470; Referee: Bossen

Ajax won 7-2 on aggregate.

=== KNVB Cup ===
==== 1/8 Final ====
21 December 2005 Round of 16	Roda JC	1 – 0	Feyenoord	Kerkrade
	Sergio 31'			Stadium: Parkstad Limburg Stadion; Attendance: unknown Referee: unknown

=== UEFA Cup ===
==== First round ====
15 September 2005	Feyenoord (Netherlands)	1 – 1	(Romania) Rapid București	De Kuip, Rotterdam
19:00	Kuyt 40'	Report	Vasilache 74' (pen.)	Referee: Vladimír Hriňák (Slovakia)

29 September 2005	Rapid București (Romania)	1 – 0	(Netherlands) Feyenoord	Stadionul Giulești-Valentin Stănescu, Bucharest
18:00	Buga 12'	Report		Referee: Lucílio Batista (Portugal)

Rapid București won 2-1 on aggregate.

=== Friendlies ===
4 July 2005	Alphense Boys	0 – 1	Feyenoord	Alphen aan den Rijn
		report	Hofs 76'	Stadium: Sportpark de Bijlen; Attendance: unknown Referee: unknown

6 July 2005	Rohda Raalte	0 – 5	Feyenoord	Raalte
		report	Kalou 6'; Boussaboun 25'; Leonardo 43'; Östlund 52'; Hofs 65'	Stadium: Sportpark Tijenraan; Attendance: unknown Referee: unknown

8 July 2005	BVV Barendrecht	0 – 3	Feyenoord	Barendrecht
		report	Boussaboun 52'; Leonardo 82'; Hofs 89'	Stadium: Sportpark de Bongerd; Attendance: 5.000; Referee: unknown

10 July 2005	Ujpest Dosza (Hungary)	1 – 3	Feyenoord	(Hungary) Siofok
	Rajczi 51'	report	Bahia 54'; Vandenbroeck 71' (o.g.); Lazović 89'	Stadium: Révész Géza utcai Stadion; Attendance: unknown Referee: unknown

17 July 2005 Nanjing International Tournament 1/2 final	Feyenoord	2 – 1	(Spain) Espanyol	(China) Nanjing
	Kuyt 9', 19'	report	Pochettino 32'	Stadium: Nanjing Olympic Sports Centre; Attendance: unknown Referee: unknown

22 July 2005 Nanjing International Tournament final	Feyenoord	3 – 0	(Uruguay) Nacional	(China) Nanjing
	Hofs 12'; Kuyt 73', 75'	report		Stadium: Nanjing Olympic Sports Centre; Attendance: unknown Referee: unknown

31 July 2005	Feyenoord	3 – 0	(Germany) Hertha BSC	Rotterdam
	Kuyt 54'; Kalou 69'; Lazović 79'; Hofs (yellow card); Östlund (yellow card)	report	Okoronkwo (red card) 50'; Neuendorf (yellow card) 58' (yellow-red card); Kovač (yellow card); Simunic (yellow card)	Stadium: De Kuip; Attendance: unknown Referee: unknown

3 August 2005	Charlton Athletic (England)	2 – 0	Feyenoord	(England) London
	Bent 60', 62'	report		Stadium: The Valley; Attendance: unknown Referee: unknown

6 August 2005	RKSV Schijndel	2 – 2	Feyenoord	Schijndel
	Van den Heuvel 12'; Kuijpers 90'	report	Derijck 8'; Boussaboun 69'; Pardo (penalty missed) 50'	Stadium: De Rooise Heide; Attendance: unknown Referee: unknown

10 January 2006	HSV Hoek	0 – 2	Feyenoord	Hoek
		report	Snoyl 25'; Biseswar 85'	Stadium: Sportpark Denoek; Attendance: unknown Referee: unknown

22 February 2006	Feyenoord	1 – 0	(Belgium) KV Mechelen	Rotterdam
	Castelen 40'	report		Stadium: De Kuip; Attendance: unknown Referee: unknown

9 May 2006	VV Verburch	1 – 4	Feyenoord	Poeldijk
	Sengers 75'	report	Pardo 14', 26'; van Hooijdonk 39', 71' (pen.)	Stadium: Verburch Terrein; Attendance: unknown Referee: unknown

18 May 2006	Groot Woudrichem	1 – 18	Feyenoord	Almkerk
	Van Tilborg 32'	report	van Hooijdonk 4', 8' (pen.), 12', 26', 38', 61' (pen.), 64'; Pardo 20', 70'; Boussaboun 25', 45'; de Guzmán 41', 55'; Bosschaart 44'; Green 57'; Abubakari 75' (pen.), 86'; Mtiliga 78'	Stadium: Sportcomplex Almkerk; Attendance: 1.500; Referee: unknown
