= Serginho Greene =

Dutch footballer (born 1982)

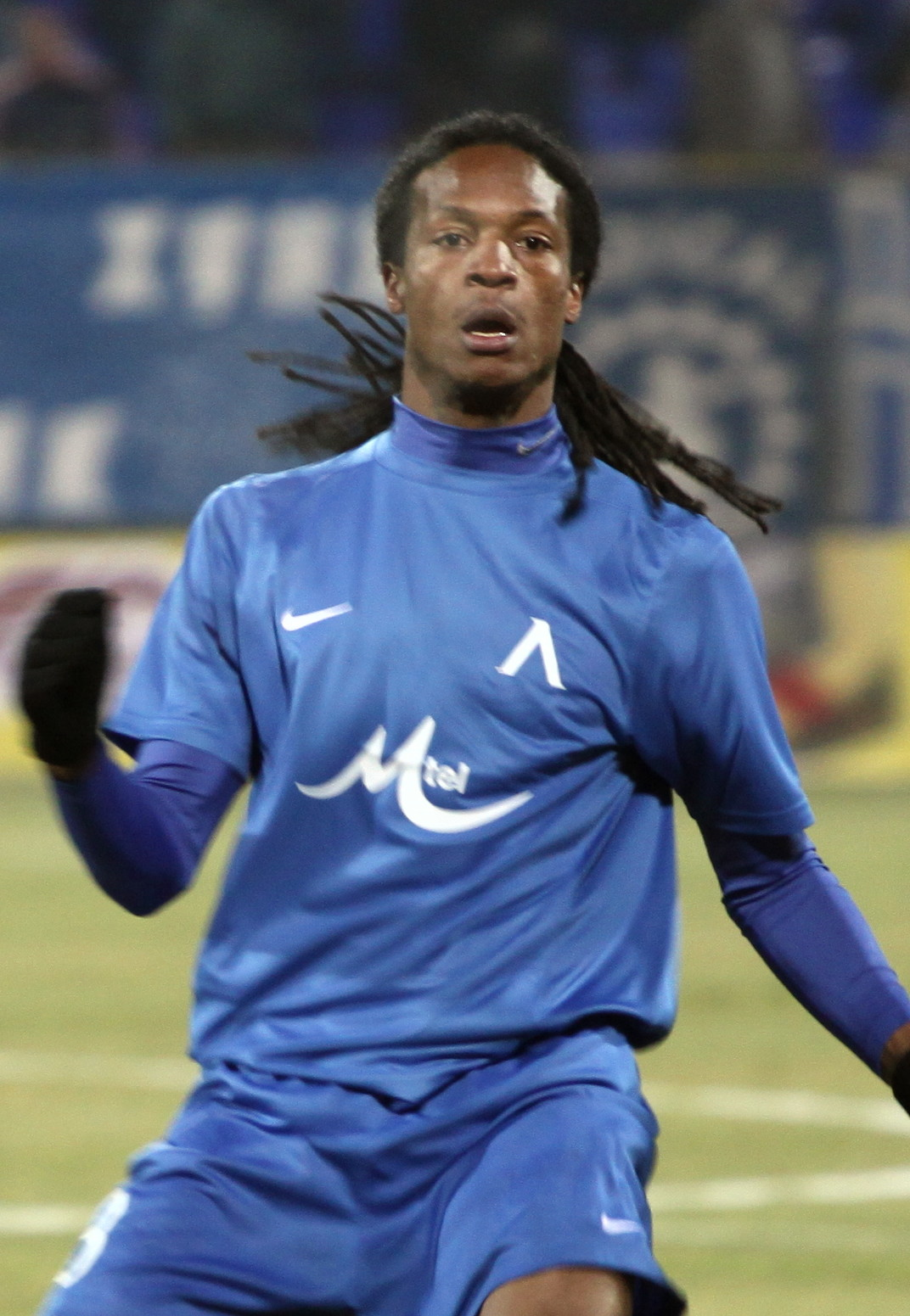
- Greene playing for Levski in 2011

Personal information
- Date of birth: 24 June 1982 (age 44)
- Place of birth: Amsterdam, Netherlands
- Height: 1.78 m (5 ft 10 in)
- Positions: Centre-back; defensive midfielder

Youth career
- 1988–1994: Abcoude
- 1994–2002: Ajax

Senior career*
Years	Team	Apps	(Gls)
2001–2002	→ Haarlem (loan)	34	(1)
2002–2005	RKC	82	(3)
2005–2009	Feyenoord	85	(1)
2009–2010	Vitesse	18	(2)
2010–2012	Levski Sofia	42	(1)
2012–2013	Vojvodina	7	(0)
2013	→ AEK Larnaca (loan)	11	(0)
2014–2015	AEK Larnaca	21	(1)
2015	Othellos Athienou	14	(1)
2015	Delhi Dynamos	4	(0)
2016	Dordrecht	8	(0)
2016–2018	RKC	66	(7)
Total		392	(17)

International career
1997	Netherlands U15	1	(1)
1996–1998	Netherlands U16	11	(0)
1998	Netherlands U17	7	(0)
2000	Netherlands U18	2	(0)
2000	Netherlands U19	4	(0)
2003	Netherlands U21	3	(0)
- * Club domestic league appearances and goals

Serginho Greene (Dutch pronunciation: [sɛrˈdʑiɲoː ˈɡrin]; born 24 June 1982) is a Dutch former professional footballer who played as a centre-back. Besides the Netherlands, he has played in Bulgaria, Serbia, Cyprus and India.

== Early life ==
Greene's life revolved around football from a young age, growing up in the southeastern part of Amsterdam, where playing street football was a daily ritual. Unlike other sports such as tennis or basketball, he was only dedicated to football. He delighted in controlling the ball and honing his skills through tricks and street matches on the streets of Amsterdam.

At the age of six, his father introduced him to FC Abcoude, where he played in their youth teams until he turned twelve. He then transitioned to Ajax's renowned football academy. He progressed through the youth ranks until he reached the under-19 squad. There, the coaches recognised his exceptional talent but believed he wasn't quite ready for Ajax's senior team. They suggested a loan move to Haarlem, which he initially hesitated about. However, he eventually made the decision to embark on that journey and kickstart his professional career.

== Club career ==
=== Haarlem ===
At Haarlem, he spent one season in de Eerste Divisie, playing 34 matches and scoring one goal. He still had a three-year remaining contract at Ajax, which he gave up, because he did not want to play in the Eerste Divisie any longer. Ajax decided to release him and fellow Eredivisie contenders RKC Waalwijk showed interest in him. Working with Martin Jol, Željko Petrović (who still was a player at RKC in those days) and Erwin Koeman he learned a lot about professional football and he developed quickly.

=== RKC Waalwijk ===
Greene played on many positions during his RKC spell. In his first season at the club he played as a left fullback, while in his second season he played both in the centre of defence and as a right fullback. During his second season at the club he became one of RKC's key players and teams like VfL Wolfsburg, Tottenham Hotspur, Galatasaray, Hamburger SV, Rangers, AZ and Feyenoord showed interest in signing him. Eventually, Feyenoord announced signing Greene on a free transfer on 14 April 2005. The main reasons for Greene to join Feyenoord were the club's reputation and their well known fanatic supporters.

=== Feyenoord ===
Greene finished the 2004–05 season in Waalwijk and joined the Feyenoord squad in the summer of 2005. At Feyenoord's presentation day on 27 July 2004, Greene flew into De Kuip by helicopter, along with other newly signed players Maikel Aerts, Timothy Derijck, Gianni Zuiverloon, Tim Vincken and Ali Boussaboun. Feyenoord also appointed a new coach to replace Ruud Gullit and to Greene's surprise it was his latest RKC coach Erwin Koeman who was given the job.

At Feyenoord, Greene impressed right from the start and gained his first team spot right away playing in the center of Rotterdam defence. Late December 2005, Feyenoord signed fellow central defender Ron Vlaar from AZ, and questions arose about who was going to play where. As right-back Alexander Östlund left the club, it was decided that Vlaar and André Bahia would play in the center and Greene would play further as a right defender. Since joining Feyenoord, Greene hardly missed a match; the team, however, was struggling in both finances and results.

In the season of 2008–09, Greene's contract, which expired in the summer of 2009, was not renewed, as Feyenoord announced the release of Greene at the end of the season.

=== Vitesse ===
On 4 November 2009, Greene joined Vitesse on a free transfer, agreeing a one-year deal with the Dutch Eredivisie club.

In June 2010, he went on trial with a Russian side Terek Grozny, but Terek decided not to sign him.

=== Levski Sofia ===
On 8 August 2010, it was announced that Greene arrived in Sofia, Bulgaria in order to negotiate terms with Bulgarian side Levski Sofia. On the next day, he made his first training with Levski. Greene signed his contract with Levski, two days later, on 10 August 2010. The contract was for two years.

During the 2010–11 season, Levski qualified for UEFA Europa League after eliminating Dundalk, Kalmar and AIK. Levski was drawn in Group C, facing Gent, Lille and Sporting CP.

Greene quickly became a first team regular playing as a defensive midfielder alongside Vladimir Gadzhev. He scored his first goal for Levski on 16 September 2010 against Gent. This goal gave Levski a 3–2 home win in their first Europa League Group stage match.

Greene started playing as a defensive midfielder, but due to Levski's defensive problems he was moved to centre-back. With the January purchase of midfielder Daniel Dimov Greene continued playing centre-half in 2011.

On 4 August 2011, he was sent off in the second leg of the UEFA Europa League match against Slovak side Spartak Trnava.

=== Vojvodina ===
On 4 July 2012, Greene signed a two-year contract with Serbian club Vojvodina.

=== Delhi Dynamos ===
On 10 September 2015, Greene signed with Delhi Dynamos and played in their second pre-season friendly match in the same day.

=== Waalwijk ===
In the summer of 2016, Greene returned to his former club RKC Waalwijk, signing a two-year deal. He left the club as his contract expired in June 2018, having scored eight goals in 72 appearances.

In October 2018, Greene announced his retirement from professional football during an interview with ELF Voetbal. He expressed his desire to prioritise his family and pursue projects outside of football.

== International career ==
Greene was a member of the Netherlands U-16 and U-21 football teams.

== Honours ==
Feyenoord

- KNVB Cup: 2008
