= 2008 KNVB Cup final =

2008 KNVB Cup Final
- Event: 2007–08 KNVB Cup
Feyenoord	Roda JC
2	0
- Date: 27 April 2008
- Venue: De Kuip, Rotterdam
- Referee: Jack van Hulten
- Attendance: 46,000

The 2008 KNVB Cup Final was a football match between Feyenoord and Roda JC on 27 April 2008 at De Kuip, Rotterdam. It was the final match of the 2007–08 KNVB Cup competition. Feyenoord beat Roda JC 2–0 after goals from Denny Landzaat and Jonathan de Guzmán. It was their eleventh KNVB Cup triumph.

== Route to the final ==
Feyenoord		Round	Roda JC	
Opponent	Result		Opponent	Result
FC Utrecht	3–0 (H)	Second round	SV Spakenburg	2–0 (A)
FC Groningen	3–1 (H)	Third round	De Graafschap	3–2 (a.e.t.) (H)
SV Deurne	4–0 (A)	Round of 16	Excelsior	3–0 (H)
FC Zwolle	2–1 (H)	Quarter-finals	FC Dordrecht	3–1 (A)
NAC Breda	2–0 (H)	Semi-finals	Heracles Almelo	2–2 (5–3 p) (A)

== Match ==
=== Details ===
27 April 2008
18:00 CEST

Feyenoord	2–0	Roda JC
Landzaat 8'; De Guzmán 36'	Report

De Kuip, Rotterdam
Attendance: 46,000
Referee: Jack van Hulten

Feyenoord	Roda JC

GK	31	(Netherlands) Henk Timmer
RB	6	(Netherlands) Theo Lucius	(yellow card) 14'
CB	3	(Netherlands) Kevin Hofland		(substituted off) 46'
CB	4	(Brazil) André Bahia
LB	5	(Netherlands) Tim de Cler
CM	19	(Netherlands) Denny Landzaat	(yellow card) 19'
CM	8	(Netherlands) Giovanni van Bronckhorst (c)
CM	17	(Turkey) Nuri Şahin		(substituted off) 71'
RW	33	(Netherlands) Jonathan de Guzmán
CF	14	(Netherlands) Michael Mols		(substituted off) 66'
LW	22	(Netherlands) Luigi Bruins
Substitutes:
GK	37	(Netherlands) Erwin Mulder
DF	18	(Netherlands) Serginho Greene		(substituted on) 46'
MF	7	(Netherlands) Danny Buijs
MF	10	(Netherlands) Nicky Hofs
MF	28	(Netherlands) Leroy Fer		(substituted on) 71'
FW	16	(South Korea) Lee Chun-soo
FW	9	(Netherlands) Roy Makaay		(substituted on) 66'
Manager:
(Netherlands) Bert van Marwijk

GK	1	(Belgium) Bram Castro
RB	24	(Turkey) Fatih Sonkaya		(substituted off) 46'
CB	3	(Netherlands) Jan-Paul Saeijs
CB	12	(Belgium) Davy De fauw
LB	27	(Hungary) Boldizsár Bodor
CM	18	(Ivory Coast) Cheick Tioté	(yellow card) 41'	(substituted off) 83'
CM	6	(Netherlands) Marcel Meeuwis (c)	(yellow card) 70'
CM	8	(Netherlands) Willem Janssen	(yellow card) 56'
RW	10	(Netherlands) Anouar Hadouir		(substituted off) 46'
CF	11	(Estonia) Andres Oper
LW	20	(Belgium) Roland Lamah
Substitutes:
GK	22	(Poland) Przemysław Tytoń
DF	2	(Netherlands) Ger Senden
DF	4	(Norway) Pa-Modou Kah
DF	14	(Netherlands) Frank van Kouwen		(substituted on) 46'
MF	17	(Canada) Marcel de Jong
FW	19	(Ivory Coast) Sekou Cissé		(substituted on) 46'
FW	9	(Belgium) Dieter Van Tornhout		(substituted on) 83'
Manager:
(Netherlands) Raymond Atteveld

Match rules

- 90 minutes.
- 30 minutes of extra-time if necessary.
- Penalty shoot-out if scores still level.
- Maximum of three substitutions.
