= André Bahia =

Brazilian footballer (born 1983)

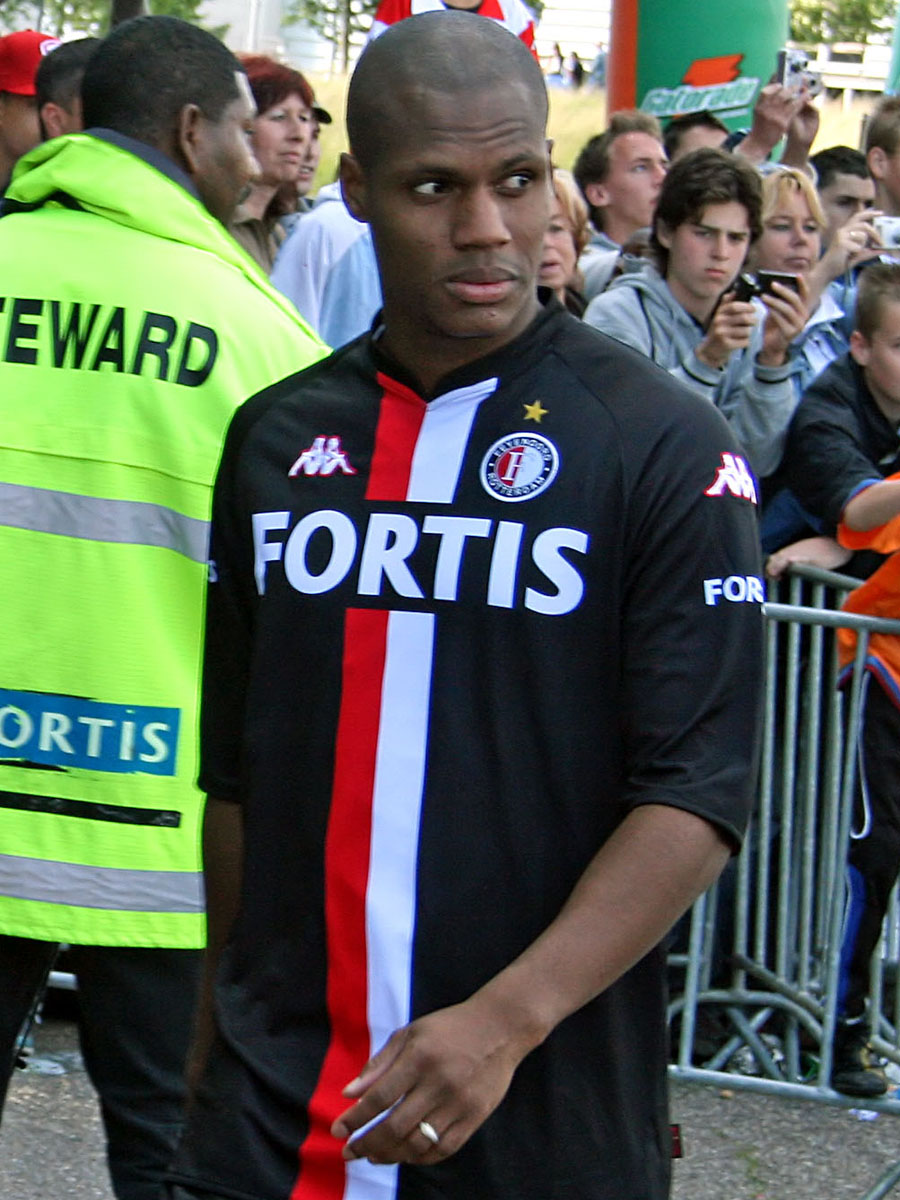
- André Bahia in the Feyenoord shirt

Personal information
- Full name: André Luiz Bahia dos Santos Viana
- Date of birth: 24 November 1983 (age 42)
- Place of birth: Rio de Janeiro, Brazil
- Height: 1.82 m (6 ft 0 in)
- Position: Centre-back

Youth career
- 1994–2000: Flamengo

Senior career*
| Years | Team | Apps | (Gls) |
| 2001–2004 | Flamengo | 81 | (3) |
| 2004 | → Palmeiras (loan) | 0 | (0) |
| 2004–2011 | Feyenoord | 179 | (17) |
| 2011–2012 | Samsunspor | 18 | (0) |
| 2013–2014 | Botafogo | 36 | (1) |
| 2015–2019 | Shonan Bellmare | 113 | (6) |
| Total | | 427 | (27) |
- * Club domestic league appearances and goals

André Luiz Bahia dos Santos Viana (born 24 November 1983) is a Brazilian former professional footballer who played as a centre-back.

== Early life ==
André Bahia was born and raised in the Tijuca area of Rio de Janeiro. He has four brothers from his father's side from a previous marriage and one sister. His father was a professional boxer in one of the lightest classes available. He was a six time Rio State champion.

== Club career ==
=== Flamengo ===
Bahia started his football career at the Escolinha Júlio César, a football school run by the former Flamengo player. After daily visiting the escolinha for two years he was asked to do a trial at Flamengo Categories of Base in 1994. Bahia joined Flamengo, where he initially played as a left-winger before switching to left-back position before playing in the central defense. It was the central defence position that meant his breakthrough in professional football.

In the 2001 season, he made his professional debut for Flamengo, where he started the whole game, in a 2–1 loss against Santa Cruz on 2 September 2001. After this, he received a handful of first team appearances throughout September by Manager Mário Zagallo. On 10 October 2001, Bahia scored his first goal for the club in a 2–2 draw against Botafogo. At the end of the 2001 season, Bahia went on to make ten appearances and scoring once for the side in all competitions.

In the 2002 season, Bahia became a first team regular after Manager Lula Pereira gave him more playing time. After the sacking of Pereira, Bahia continued to remain in the first team under the new management of Evaristo de Macedo. At the end of the 2002 season, he went on to make 24 appearances in all competitions.

In the 2003 season, Bahia continued to be in the first team by new manager Oswaldo de Oliveira. On 30 March 2003, he scored his first goal of the season, in a 1–1 draw against Coritiba. Bahia then spent the rest of the year, establishing himself in the centre–back position for the side. At the end of the 2003 season, he went on to make 35 appearances and scoring once in all competitions. By November, the club began negotiating with Bahia over a new contract.

Ahead of the 2004 season, Bahia was expected to leave Flamengo, having grown impatient with delays of negotiations. He was sent on loan to Palmeiras for 1.5 months, but returned to his parent club early. It was reported that Bahia was angry with Palmeiras over not playing any games with the team. With his return at Flamengo after the loan period things improved and he fought himself back into the team. On 2 September 2004, he scored his first goal of the season, in a 2–0 win over Vitória. However, after returning to Brazil following his signing for Feyenoord, Bahia was disciplined for "a breach of contract" and as punishment, he was told to train just with the fitness coach for several weeks. He was only allowed back into the team when they ran out of central defenders due to injuries and suspensions. Despite this, Flamengo fans had Bahia's backing, even facing his darker days at the club. In the last game of the season against Cruzeiro, Bahia scored a brace for the side, as they beat Cruzeiro 6–2 to avoid relegation in Campeonato Brasileiro Série A. At the end of the 2004 season, he went on to make 35 appearances and scoring once in all competitions.

=== Feyenoord ===
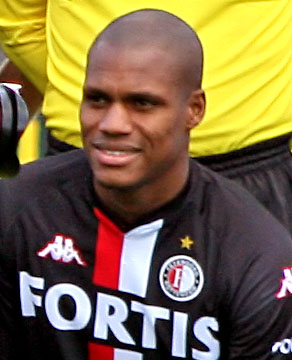
Bahia at Feyenoord

It was announced on 27 October 2004 that Bahia moved to Netherlands, joining Eredivisie side Feyenoord until the end of the 2004–05 season, and joined the team on 1 January 2005. It came after when he went on the trial with the club two days when he was scouted by the club's director Mark Wotte. Upon joining the club, Bahia was given a number four shirt for the side, Three years after signing for the club, Feyenoord was ordered by Court of Arbitration for Sport to pay Flamengo 67,000 euros.

After the first two months at the club's reserves, Bahia made his Feyenoord debut, where he started the whole game, in a 4–1 win over Roda JC on 18 March 2005. Bahia then scored his first goal for the club on 13 April 2005, in a 4–1 loss against Den Bosch. A week later on 24 April 2005, he scored again, in a 2–0 win over FC Groningen. Two days later, he signed a two–year contract with the club, keeping him until 2007, and it was confirmed on 11 May 2005. Despite losing his first team place, Bahia played five matches and scoring twice during the second half of the 2004–05 season.

In the 2005–06 season, Bahia became a first team regular for the side under the management of Erwin Koeman and formed a centre–back partnership with Serginho Greene. Bahia made his UEFA Cup debut against Rapid București in the first leg of the tournament and started the whole game, in a 1–1 draw on 15 September 2005. Three days later on 18 September 2005, he scored his first goal of the season, in a 5–1 win over Heerenveen. However in the return leg, Bahia started the whole game, as Feyenoord lost 1–0, resulting in the club's elimination in the UEFA Cup. Two months later, on 20 November 2005, he scored his second goal of the season, in a 3–2 win over Roda JC. On 15 January 2006, Bahia scored his third goal of the season, in a 1–0 win over Vitesse. Along with new signing Ron Vlaar, they helped Feyenoord keep a clean sheet in the next two matches against Roda JC and Heracles Almelo. This proved to have worked, as they formed a centre–back partnership with for the rest of the 2005–06 season. Throughout the season, Bahia played every league match until he was sent–off for a second bookable offence, in a 1–0 loss against rivals’ Ajax in the first leg of the play-offs round. As a result, Bahia missed one match, as the club went on to lose 7–2 on aggregate. Despite the loss, his contributions at Feyenoord saw the club qualify for the UEFA Cup next season. At the end of the 2005–06 season, he went on to make thirty–seven appearances and scoring four times in all competitions.

In the 2006–07 season, Bahia continued to remain in the first team, starting out in the first six matches of the season. His first goal of the season came on 21 September 2006 against SC Veendam in the third round of the KNVB Cup, which saw Feyenoord win 3–2. However, he suffered a concussion during a match against Excelsior on 24 September 2006 after colliding with Serginho Greene that saw him substituted in the 32nd minute and was sidelined for three weeks. But Bahia made his first team return from injury against Basel in the UEFA Cup match on 19 October 2006, starting the whole game, in a 1–1 draw. Two weeks later on 5 November 2006, he scored his first league goal of the season, in a 2–1 win over Vitesse. During a 3–0 loss against AS Nancy on 30 November 2006, Bahia was at fault when he scored an own goal; and eventually, Feyenoord were banned from European competition following hooliganism prior to and during the match against them. On 30 December 2006, he signed a new contract with the club, keeping him until 2009. Following his return from injury, Bahia continued to establish himself in the first team, rotating in playing either playing at centre–back and left–back positions. His third goal of the season came on 28 January 2007, scoring in a 3–1 win over RKC Waalwijk. Despite missing two more matches later in the 2006–07 season, he went on to make thirty–six appearances and scoring two times in all competitions.

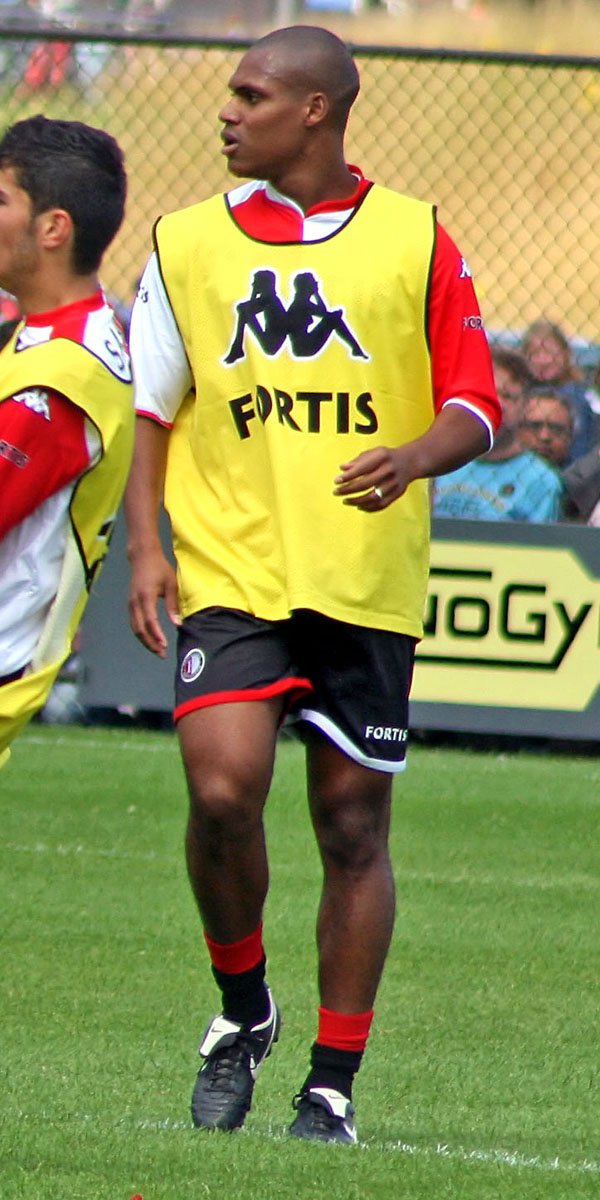
Bahia training for Feyenoord before the match in 2007.

In the 2007–08 season, Bahia found himself behind the pecking order in the first team after losing place to Kevin Hofland, who was signed from VfL Wolfsburg and Vlaar who formed a partnership in centre defence. However, due to the injury of Vlaar, Bahia returned to the starting line-up for Feyenoord and formed a centre-back partnership with either Theo Lucius, Hofland and Greene. He then helped the club keep four consecutive clean sheets between 26 September 2007 and 20 October 2007. Bahia, once again, helped Feyenoord keep four consecutive clean sheets between 2 December 2007 and 26 December 2007. On 30 January 2008, he scored his first goal of the season, in a 2–2 draw against AZ Alkmaar. Bahia also added two more goals later in the season, scoring against Heracles Almelo and Willem II. He was involved in the squad for the final of KNVB Cup, as Feyenoord were champions by beating Roda JC 2–0, therefore qualified for the UEFA Cup next season. At the end of the 2007–08 season, Bahia went on to make thirty–four appearances and scored three times in all competitions.

Ahead of the 2008–09 season, Bahia's performances from last season sparked interests of Portuguese side Porto, who were keen on signing him. The transfer speculation ended when De Teelgraaf reported and Feyenoord's website that he signed a contract with the club, keeping him until 2012. On 19 November 2018, the contract extension was officially confirmed. He scored Feyenoord's first goal of the 2008–09 season, scoring from a header, in a 3–1 loss against Heracles Almelo. A month later on 28 September 2008, Bahia scored his second goal of the season, in a 3–1 loss against FC Groningen. Since the start of the 2008–09 season, he continued to regain his first team place for Feyenoord, forming a centre–back partnership with either Hofland and Lucius. Bahia played in both legs of the play-offs round against NAC Breda, as the club lost 7–2 on aggaragate. However, he found himself sidelined on three occasions, due to injury, compassionate leave and suspension. At the end of the 2008–09 season, Bahia went on to make 42 appearances and scoring two times in all competitions.

In the 2009–10 season, Bahia started the season well when he helped Feyenoord keep four clean sheets in a row. Bahia continued to remain in the first team for the side, where he formed a central partnership with the returning Vlaar and Hofland. Bahia then scored his first goal of the season against Sparta Rotterdam in a 2–1 loss on 18 October 2009. Nine days later, on 27 October 2009, he scored again in the third round of the KNVB Cup, in a 2–0 win over Den Bosch. On 28 February 2010, Bahia scored his second goal of the season, in a 3–2 win over FC Groningen. He then set up a goal for veteran striker Roy Makaay to score a winner against Vitesse in a 2–1 win on 31 March 2010. In the last game of the season against SC Heerenveen, Bahia scored his fourth goal of the season, in a 6–2 win. Bahia then played in both legs of KNVB Cup Final against rivals' Ajax, as Feyenoord lost 6–1 on aggregate. Despite missing out three matches during the 2009–10 season, Bahia went on to make thirty–eight appearances and scoring four times in all competitions.

In the 2010–11 season, Bahia made the first two appearances for Feyenoord before suffering a knee injury that saw him out for three weeks. After returning to full training, he returned to the first team from injury, starting a match before being substituted in the 71st minute, in a 2–0 loss against NAC Breda on 12 September 2010. In a follow–up against rivals' Ajax on 19 September 2010, Bahia scored his first goal of the season, in a 2–1 loss. During the match, he was involved in an incident after elbowing Luis Suárez and was booked as a result; after the match, no action was taken against him. Bahia later reflected that playing with Luis Suárez was the most troubling striker he played with. In a match against PSV Eindhoven, he, along with Tim de Cler and Stefan de Vrij were in the defence squad, as the club conceded ten goals, in a 10 –0 loss, their heaviest defeat ever, on 24 October 2010. In a follow up match against VVV-Venlo on 27 October 2010, Bahia was able to earn a redemption for scored his first goal of the season, in a 3–0 win. His performance was subjected of criticism, which he acknowledged to Metro: "As an excuse for the poor performances it's often said the team is young and therefore prone to making mistakes. When you keep hearing that excuse, the incentive of having to perform fades." Bahia also received criticism from Willem van Hanegem for his performance and was responsible for making teammates more nervous and facing pressure. At the start of the second half of the season, he spent the rest of the season on the substitute bench, as Manager Mario Been preferred to use de Vrij and Vlaar in the centre–back positions. By March 2011, Bahia was linked with a move to Russian side Terek Grozny. However, he said about the move to Russia, saying: "Nobody has reported to me or to Feyenoord.Then I do not assume that it is serious. I do know that a number of people offer me everywhere. Those people do not represent my business, but are fortune seekers. I will not do anything about it." But Bahia appeared in the remaining matches of the 2010–11 season following an injury of Vlaar. At the end of the 2010–11 season, Bahia went on to make twenty–one appearances and scoring two times in all competitions.

At the end of the season, it announced on the club's website that Bahia has given a free transfer, allowing him to leave the club. It was revealed that should Bahia have stayed at Feyenoord for the 2011–12 season, he would have been behind the pecking order in the first team, placing on the substitute bench.

=== Samsunspor ===
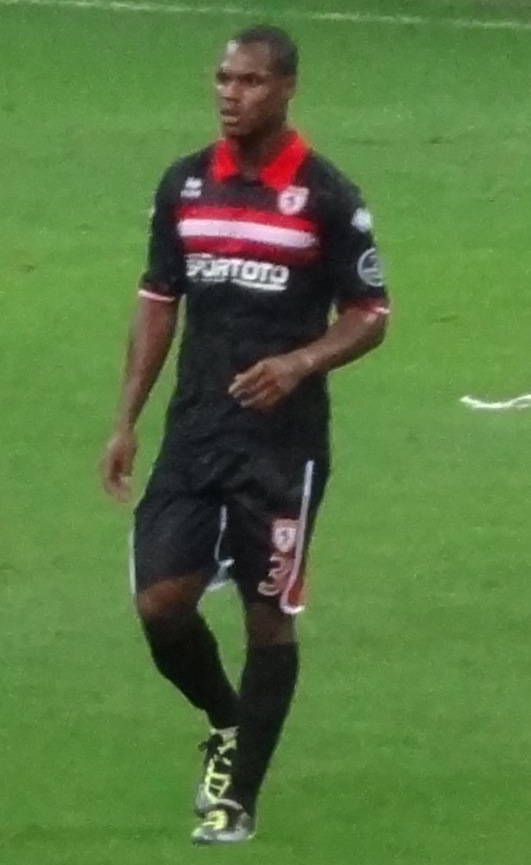
Bahia during his time at Samsunspor in 2011.

On 4 July 2011, he moved to Turkish Süper Lig side Samsunspor after seven-year spell in Feyenoord, signing a three–year contract. Upon joining the club, he told Feyenoord's official website that "he admits he is sorry to be leaving and says sorely miss this club and this city" and said about the new move, quoting: "It will take time to get used to being Samsunspor after all those years at Feyenoord".

Bahia made his debut in the Samsunspor shirt, starting the whole game, in a 3–2 win over Gençlerbirliği on 10 September 2011. Since joining the club, he quickly became a first team regular for the side, establishing himself in the centre–back position. During the season, he also played out in either left–back and defensive–midfield positions. However, in the last game of the season against Sivasspor, Bahia started the match, as Samunspor lost 2–1 and was relegated to the TFF First League next season. At the end of the 2011–12 season, he finished his first season at the club, making 31 appearances in all competitions.

At the start of the 2012–13 season, Andre left Samsunspor by mutual consent after one season. His release was explained as Andre sued the club over allegedly owing him four months of unpaid wages. Shortly after, he spoke out about his life and playing in Turkey.

=== Botafogo ===
After being released by Samsunspor, Bahia returned to Brazil by joining Botafogo on trial, with a view of permanent contract. Following the trial, Botafogo confirmed their interests in signing him in late–December. The move was later confirmed on 28 January 2013, as Bahia signed for the side on a one–year contract. Upon joining the club, he was presented by the side at the press conference. Then, on 9 May 2013, he signed a contract with the club, keeping him until the end of the year.

Bahia made his Botafogo debut on 29 May 2013, coming on as a late substitute, in a 2–1 win over Santos. Then, on 10 August 2013, he made his first start, playing the whole game, in a 1–1 draw against Goiás. Bahia made three more starts for the side towards the end of the season. In his first season at Botafogo, Bahia made eleven appearances for the club, having spent most of the season on the substitute bench. At the end of the 2013 season, Bahia had his contract renewed with Botafogo. During the 2013 season, he was part of the squad that saw Botafogo win the Campeonato Carioca.

In the 2014 season, Bahia continued to start his season at Botafogo on the substitute bench in a number of matches. On 22 May 2014, he made his first league appearances of the season, in a 2–1 loss against Grêmio. Bahia then received a handful of first team appearances throughout May following an absent of Dória but returned to the substitute bench at the beginning of July. Bahia then returned to the starting line-up on 17 August 2014 against Fluminense, in a 2–0 win. Following this, he was subjected of a transfer move to Fluminese but the move was no success and Bahia stayed at Botafogo. Since returning to the starting line-up, Bahia received a handful of first team appearances for the side following the departure of Dória. On 11 September 2014, Bahia scored his first goal for Botafogo, in a 4–2 loss against São Paulo. Despite being sidelined on two occasions later in the 2014 season, Bahia went on to make 26 appearances and scoring once in all competitions.

At the end of the 2014 season, it was announced that Bahia was leaving Botafogo to join an unnamed Japanese club. It came after when Bahia started negotiating with Botafogo to stay or next season despite the club's financial problems. After his move to Japan, Bahia made a farewell speech to Botafogo's supporters and felt moving abroad was something he can't turn down.

=== Shonan Bellmare ===
It was announced on 19 December 2014 that Bahia left Brazil for Japan to join J1 League side Shonan Bellmare, signing a two–year contract. Upon joining the club, he was given a number four shirt for the side. He moved to Japan, where his former Feyenoord teammates, Shinji Ono and Ryo Miyaichi are from.

Bahia made his Shonan Bellmare debut, where he started the whole game, in a 3–1 loss against Urawa Red Diamonds in the opening game of the season. Since making his debut for the club, Bahia quickly became a first team regular for the side. Between 10 May 2015 and 30 May 2015, Bahia helped the side earning three clean sheets following two wins and one draw. Throughout the season, Bahia's performance in the number of matches helped the side earn eighth place in the table. In the September 2015 interview with WEB magazine, Bahia spoke out the playing style in Japan. Despite being sidelined towards the end of the 2015 season, he finished the season at Shonan Bellmare, making 32 appearances in all competitions. He was named the club's MVP of the season.

In the 2016 season, Bahia continued to feature in the first team as centre–back position for the second time this season. He then helped the side earn the first two wins with clean sheets against Yokohama F. Marinos and Sagan Tosu. On 9 July 2016, Bahia scored his first goal for the club, in a 1–0 win over Albirex Niigata. His performance against Albirex Niigata earned him a spot for the Best Eleven in Matchday 2 of the League Second Stage. Then, on 30 July 2016, he scored again, which was his second goal for the club, in a 3–2 loss against Kawasaki Frontale. For the rest of the 2016 season, Bahia continued to regain his place, as Shonan Bellmore were relegated to J2 League. At the end of the 2016 season, he went on to make thirty–five appearances and scoring two times in all competitions.

In the 2017 season, Bahia featured in the first team as centre–back position, starting the season well, going the first five league matches without defeat in the J2 League. However, in a 1–0 loss against Oita Trinita on 22 April 2017, he was sent–off for second bookable offence, receiving a red card at the last minute. After returning to the first team from suspension, Bahia then played a role when he assisted Naoki Yamada to score the winning goal against Matsumoto Yamaga. Between 10 June 2017 to 25 June 2017, he helped the side earn three clean sheets, all of them were wins for Shonan Bellmore. Then on 16 July 2017, Bahia scored his first goal for the club, in a 2–0 win over Tokyo Verdy. Between 16 August 2017 and 26 August 2017, he, again, helped the side earn three clean sheets, two of them were wins for Shonan Bellmore. Bahia then scored two goals between 9 September 2017 and 16 September 2017 against Kamatamare Sanuki and Renofa Yamaguchi. He then helped Shonan Bellmore win promotion back to J.League 1 after a 1–1 draw against Zweigen Kanazawa on 29 October 2017. At the end of the 2017 season, Bahia went on to make thirty–nine appearances and scoring four times in all competitions. For his performance, he was named J.League 2 Best XI, along with Yota Akimoto.

At the start of the 2018 season, Bahia set up a goal for Temma Matsuda, who scored an equaliser in a 1–1 draw against Kawasaki Frontale on 2 March 2018. He continued to regain his first team place in the first half of the season. However, Bahia soon found himself out of the first team, having appeared on the substitute bench. On 9 May 2018, he scored his first goal of the season, in a 4–3 win over Vissel Kobe in the group stage of the J.League Cup. Although he appeared in the first team occasionally, Bahia continued to remain in the sidelined for the rest of the season. At the end of the 2018 season, he went on to make seventeen appearances and scoring once in all competitions.

It was announced on 10 January 2019 that Bahia's contract with Shonan Bellmare was not renewed and left the club.

== International career ==
In 2000, Bahia was called up by Mário Zagallo to represent Brazil at the under 20 level, and some point, he even became the captain of this team. Three years, Bahia was then called up to the Brazil again but this time, it was at the under 23 level.

After five years in the Netherlands after joining Feyenoord, Bahia said that he was open to apply for Dutch citizenship, and was applying for a Portuguese citizenship. Bahia said he was open to play for the national team.

== Personal life ==
In addition to speaking Portuguese, Bahia speaks Dutch, which he learned from during his time at Feyenoord. Since moving to Japan, Bahia spoke out his life in the country, having taking an interest there.

Bahia is married to his wife Tatiana and together, they have two children, David and Caio. During his time at Shonan Bellmare, he earned a nickname by the club: Tetsuyoroitoshi (Gladiator).

== Career statistics ==
As of 23 February 2018

Appearances and goals by club, season and competition
| Club | Season | League | | | Cup | | Continental | | Total | |
| Club | Season | Division | Apps | Goals | Apps | Goals | Apps | Goals | Apps | Goals |
|---|---|---|---|---|---|---|---|---|---|---|
| Flamengo | 2001 | Série A | 10 | 1 | 0 | 0 | 0 | 0 | 10 | 1 |
| Flamengo | 2002 | Série A | 22 | 0 | 1 | 0 | 1 | 0 | 24 | 0 |
| Flamengo | 2003 | Série A | 28 | 1 | 4 | 0 | 3 | 0 | 35 | 1 |
| Flamengo | 2004 | Série A | 26 | 3 | 5 | 0 | 2 | 0 | 33 | 3 |
| Flamengo | Total | | 86 | 5 | 10 | 0 | 6 | 0 | 102 | 5 |
| Palmeiras (loan) | 2004 | Série A | 0 | 0 | 0 | 0 | 0 | 0 | 0 | 0 |
| Feyenoord | 2004–05 | Eredivisie | 5 | 2 | 0 | 0 | 0 | 0 | 5 | 2 |
| Feyenoord | 2005–06 | Eredivisie | 34 | 3 | 0 | 0 | 0 | 0 | 34 | 3 |
| Feyenoord | 2006–07 | Eredivisie | 29 | 2 | 0 | 0 | 0 | 0 | 29 | 2 |
| Feyenoord | 2007–08 | Eredivisie | 29 | 3 | 0 | 0 | 0 | 0 | 29 | 3 |
| Feyenoord | 2008–09 | Eredivisie | 30 | 2 | 3 | 0 | 0 | 0 | 33 | 2 |
| Feyenoord | 2009–10 | Eredivisie | 32 | 3 | 6 | 1 | 0 | 0 | 38 | 4 |
| Feyenoord | 2010–11 | Eredivisie | 20 | 2 | 1 | 0 | 0 | 0 | 21 | 2 |
| Feyenoord | Total | | 179 | 17 | 10 | 1 | 0 | 0 | 189 | 18 |
| Samsunspor | 2011–12 | Süper Lig | 29 | 0 | 2 | 0 | – | | 31 | 0 |
| Samsunspor | 2012–13 | Süper Lig | 0 | 0 | 0 | 0 | – | | 0 | 0 |
| Samsunspor | Total | | 29 | 0 | 2 | 0 | 0 | 0 | 31 | 0 |
| Botafogo | 2013 | Série A | 11 | 0 | 1 | 0 | – | | 12 | 0 |
| Botafogo | 2014 | Série A | 25 | 1 | 3 | 1 | 1 | 0 | 29 | 2 |
| Botafogo | Total | | 36 | 1 | 4 | 1 | 1 | 0 | 41 | 2 |
| Shonan Bellmare | 2015 | J1 League | 30 | 0 | 1 | 0 | 1 | 0 | 32 | 0 |
| Shonan Bellmare | 2016 | J1 League | 31 | 2 | 2 | 0 | 2 | 0 | 35 | 2 |
| Shonan Bellmare | 2017 | J2 League | 39 | 4 | 0 | 0 | – | | 39 | 4 |
| Shonan Bellmare | Total | | 100 | 6 | 3 | 0 | 3 | 0 | 106 | 6 |
| Career total | | | 425 | 27 | 19 | 2 | 4 | 0 | 448 | 29 |

== Honours ==
Flamengo

- Taça Guanabara: 2001, 2004
- Campeonato Carioca: 2001, 2004
- Copa dos Campeões: 2001

Feyenoord

- KNVB Cup: 2007–08

Botafogo

- Campeonato Carioca: 2013

Shonan Bellmore

- J2 League: 2017
