= Sebastián Pardo =

Chilean footballer (born 1982)

Personal information
- Full name: Sebastián Eduardo Pardo Campos
- Date of birth: 1 January 1982 (age 44)
- Place of birth: Quillota, Chile
- Height: 1.70 m (5 ft 7 in)
- Position: Midfielder

Youth career
- Universidad de Chile

Senior career*
Years	Team	Apps	(Gls)
1999–2002	Universidad de Chile	45	(2)
2002–2007	Feyenoord	70	(10)
2007–2008	Excelsior	16	(1)
2008–2009	Universidad de Chile	15	(2)
2010	Unión Temuco	10	(1)
2013	Coquimbo Unido	5	(0)
Total		161	(16)

International career
1999	Chile U17		
2001	Chile U20	3	(1)
2002	Chile	1	(0)
- * Club domestic league appearances and goals

Sebastián Eduardo Pardo Campos (born 1 January 1982) is a Chilean former professional footballer who played as a midfielder.

== Club career ==
Pardo was born in Quillota. He began his career at Universidad de Chile, and joined Eredivisie's Feyenoord in 2002–03, debuting on 10 September 2002, against Excelsior Rotterdam (4–1 win), scoring his first goal for Feyenoord in that match. He was largely used as a backup at Feyenoord during the five years he spent there, and joined Excelsior in 2007–08.

In July 2008, he returned to Chile to play again for Universidad de Chile. On 9 June 2009, he announced his retirement from football, because of family problems.

== International career ==
Pardo represented Chile at under-17 level in the 1999 South American Championship in Uruguay and Chile at under-20 level in both the 2001 South American Championship in Ecuador and the 2001 FIFA World Youth Championship in Argentina.

At senior level, Pardo represented Chile once, in 2002.

=== Controversies ===
Previous to 2001 FIFA World Youth Championship, Pardo and seven other players were arrested in a brothel what must to be closed. The incident was known as "El episodio de las luces rojas" (Chapter of the red lights) due to the excuse employed by Jaime Valdés.

After the tournament, the eight players (Valdés, Millar, Salgado, Órdenes, Soto, Droguett, Campos and Pardo) were suspended for three international matches.

== Personal life ==
His daughter, Vaitiare, is a footballer from the Universidad Católica youth system.

== Honours ==
Universidad de Chile

- Primera División de Chile: 1999, 2000, 2009 Apertura
- Copa Chile: 1998, 2000
