= Melvin Fleur =

Dutch footballer

Personal information
- Date of birth: 18 February 1982 (age 44)
- Place of birth: Amsterdam, Netherlands
- Position: Midfielder

Youth career
- 1989-1991: AS '80
- 1991-2001: Ajax

Senior career*
Years	Team	Apps	(Gls)
2001–2003	Anderlecht	1	(0)
2002–2003	→ RBC (loan)	29	(1)
2003–2009	RBC	80	(4)

International career
2001	Netherlands U19	4	(0)
- * Club domestic league appearances and goals as of 25 May 2026

Melvin Fleur (born 18 February 1982 in Amsterdam) is a Dutch former professional footballer who played for Eredivisie club RBC Roosendaal between 2001 and 2009.

He was first loaned to RBC by Belgian giants Anderlecht, before making a definitive transfer.

Fleur also played 4 games for the Netherlands national under-19 football team.

After retiring as a player, Fleur became a physiotherapist and worked in that position for Feyenoord.
