= Remon de Vries =

Dutch footballer

Personal information
- Full name: Remon de Vries
- Date of birth: 6 July 1979 (age 47)
- Place of birth: Apeldoorn, Netherlands
- Height: 1.76 m (5 ft 9 in)
- Position: Midfielder

Youth career
- Groen Wit
- AGOVV

Senior career*
Years	Team	Apps	(Gls)
2003–2004	AGOVV	32	(0)
2004–2009	Heracles Almelo	126	(2)
2009–2010	AGOVV	17	(0)
2010–2013	WHC Wezep		
- * Club domestic league appearances and goals

Remon de Vries (born 6 July 1979) is a Dutch former professional footballer who played as a midfielder.

== Career ==
De Vries is a midfielder who was born in Apeldoorn and made his debut in professional football, being part of the AGOVV Apeldoorn squad in the 2003–04 season. At the end of that season he joined Heracles Almelo.

In the summer of 2009 he left Heracles on a free transfer and returned to AGOVV Apeldoorn on 14 September. He was released in June 2010 by his club AGOVV, and retired from professional football. He later signed as an amateur player with WHC Wezep.
