= Ferne Snoyl =

Dutch footballer (born 1985)

Personal information
- Full name: Ferne Dean Snoyl
- Date of birth: 8 March 1985 (age 41)
- Place of birth: Leidschendam, Netherlands
- Height: 1.77 m (5 ft 10 in)
- Position: Left-back

Youth career
- DWO Zoetermeer
- Feyenoord

Senior career*
Years	Team	Apps	(Gls)
2003–2006	Feyenoord	15	(0)
2004–2005	→ Den Bosch (loan)	25	(0)
2006	→ Aberdeen (loan)	12	(1)
2006–2007	NEC	29	(2)
2007–2009	RKC Waalwijk	39	(6)
2009–2011	NAC Breda	14	(1)
2011	Újpest	2	(0)
Total		136	(10)

International career
1999	Netherlands U15	1	(0)
2001–2002	Netherlands U17	13	(2)
2005–2006	Netherlands Olympic	2	(0)
- * Club domestic league appearances and goals

Ferne Dean Snoyl (born 8 March 1985) is a Dutch former professional footballer who played as a left-back.

== Club career ==
Snoyl started his professional career with Feyenoord, where he was considered a talented player but with disciplinary issues. He made his professional debut on 25 September 2003, starting in a 2–1 home win against FC Kärnten in the UEFA Cup. He was sent on loan to FC Den Bosch in the 2004–05 season to mature. He returned to Feyenoord after the season, but lost out to Pascal Bosschaart to become the starter at left-back. As a result, he was sent on a six-month loan to Scottish club Aberdeen in January 2006.

After his loan ended, Snoyl signed a three-year contract with Eredivisie club NEC on 7 July 2006, reuniting him with former Feyenoord assistant coach, Mario Been. After the first game of the 2007–08 season, Snoyl was axed from the squad by Been as he was deemed overweight. As a result, NEC hired a dietician. Snoyl regained fitness, and was eventually included in the first team again after a week. After several legal issues in October 2007, NEC announced on 7 November that Snoyl's contract had been terminated.

On 27 November 2007, Snoyl joined Eerste Divisie club RKC Waalwijk on a six-month contract, with an option for an additional year. He made his debut for the club on 11 January 2008, coming on as a substitute in the 68th minute for Savvas Exouzidis in a 7–2 league win over Go Ahead Eagles. His first start came four days later in a KNVB Cup match against HFC Haarlem, which saw RKC lose on penalties. On 29 April, the option in his contract was triggered and thus extended until 2009.

Despite a successful stint with RKC, Snoyl chose not to extend his contract with the club, and instead signed a two-year deal with NAC Breda on 13 July 2009, where he was the intended successor of Patrick Mtiliga, who had moved to Málaga. Again, he struggled with overweight and was demoted from the first team on 2 April 2010. He left the club as his contract expired in 2011. NAC supporters had tauntingly held up a banner in his final game for the club referring to his overweight and chanted "Big Mac Snoyl".

A free agent, Snoyl had a successful trial with Hungarian club Újpest in September 2011, and he signed a deal for the remainder of the 2011–12 season on 7 November. He left the club on 12 January 2012, and subsequently retired from professional football as a 27-year-old.

== International career ==
Snoyl has been capped for various national youth teams, and participated in the 2001 UEFA European Under-16 Championship and 2002 UEFA European Under-17 Championship.

== Legal issues ==
On 20 February 2008, Snoyl was found guilty of assaulting his then-girlfriend 18 October 2007. He was sentenced to 50 hours of community service.

On 21 February 2022, Snoyl was named as a suspect in a major case involving drug distribution and trafficking, and had been charged by the Public Prosecution Service.

== Personal life ==
Outside of football, Snoyl is a qualified tattoo artist and owns his own tattoo studio in The Hague. Customers include Wout Weghorst, Kevin-Prince Boateng and Quincy Promes.
