= Ron Vlaar =

Dutch former footballer (born 1985)

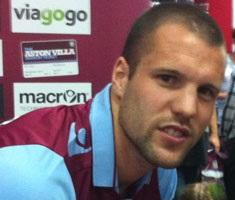
- Vlaar with Aston Villa in 2012

Personal information
- Full name: Ron Peter Vlaar
- Date of birth: 16 February 1985 (age 41)
- Place of birth: Hensbroek, Netherlands
- Height: 1.89 m (6 ft 2 in)
- Position: Centre-back

Youth career
- 1991–1995: Apollo '68
- 1995–1996: SVW '27
- 1996–2004: AZ

Senior career*
Years	Team	Apps	(Gls)
2004–2006	AZ	10	(0)
2006–2012	Feyenoord	136	(8)
2012–2015	Aston Villa	79	(2)
2015–2021	AZ	91	(5)
Total		316	(15)

International career
2004–2005	Netherlands U19	4	(0)
2005–2007	Netherlands U21	15	(0)
2005–2014	Netherlands	32	(1)
Medal record
Feyenoord
Winner	KNVB Cup	2008
Aston Villa
Second place	FA Cup	2015
Netherlands
Winner	UEFA Under-21 Championship	2006
Winner	UEFA Under-21 Championship	2007
Third place	FIFA World Cup	2014
- * Club domestic league appearances and goals

Ron Peter Vlaar (Dutch pronunciation: [ˈrɔɱ ˈvlaːr]; born 16 February 1985) is a Dutch former footballer who played as a centre-back.

Vlaar came up through AZ's youth ranks. After making his professional debut, he played sparingly for two seasons before joining Feyenoord in 2006. He later played in the Premier League with Aston Villa before rejoining AZ in 2015.

Vlaar represented the Netherlands at various youth levels. However, he had most success with the Netherlands U20 on the 2005 FIFA World Youth Championship and with Netherlands U21 on the UEFA European Under-21 Championship in 2006 and 2007. Vlaar was a Netherlands international from 2005 until retiring in 2014. He was included in national team for Euro 2012 and the 2014 FIFA World Cup, where they won the bronze medal. Vlaar played 32 times for the Netherlands national team and has captained both Feyenoord and Aston Villa.

== Early life ==
Vlaar was born in Hensbroek, North Holland. His mother, Margaret, was a handball player, while his father was an amateur football player. Vlaar has two younger sisters, Ellen and Lisan, who are both active in sports as well. Ellen is a gymnast and Lisan plays volleyball.

== Club career ==
=== Youth ===
In Hensbroek, Vlaar joined local club Apollo '68 at the age of six. Apollo '68 youth coach Kees Wijte was quickly convinced: "But when Ron was five, he was already allowed to train with us. You could already see how good he was. Ron had a powerful kick with both his left and right leg, and a very good one as well. Besides, he had a fantastic mentality. Ron always wanted to win and become better."

When Vlaar went to his final year in elementary school, he left Apollo '68. The youngster wanted to play on a higher level and joined SVW '27 from Heerhugowaard. At his new club, Vlaar's development went well above expectation. After playing for SVW '27 for one season, he was invited to join the AZ youth academy, a professional side playing in the Eerste Divisie. In 2002, Vlaar signed his first youth contract with the club, keeping him in Alkmaar until summer 2007. Having initially started out in the attacking midfield position, Vlaar began playing in the defender position after "being told by his coach that he could be better focus in the back".

=== AZ Alkmaar ===
Halfway towards the end of the 2004–05 season, Vlaar made his unexpected Eredivisie debut at the age of 20 because due to suspensions within the first-team squad at the end of the season, he was paired up with the experienced centre back Barry Opdam on 23 April 2005 in the away match against RKC Waalwijk, as AZ lost 2–1. Five days later, on 28 April 2005, Vlaar made his European debut when he was part of the starting line-up in the UEFA Cup semi-final away match against Sporting Lisbon, losing 2–1. Vlaar played three Eredivisie matches and two UEFA Cup matches in his debut season.

While Vlaar thought the season 2005–06 would be his breakthrough year, AZ coach Louis van Gaal kept choosing for more experienced players. However, he suffered a thigh injury that saw him miss the first two league matches of the season. But Vlaar made his first appearance of the season, coming on as a 64th-minute substitute, in a 5–0 win against Vitesse on 27 August 2005. He scored his first goal for the club, in a 5–3 loss against Krylia Sovetov Samara in the first leg of the UEFA Cup on 15 September 2005. Vlaar was part of the starting line-up thrice, while he came in as a substitute in four matches, having a total of seven Eredivisie appearances in his first half-year. In a match against PSV Eindhoven on 15 October 2005, Vlaar received a red card for a second bookable offence, in a 3–0 loss. Despite his substitute status at AZ, the youngster impressed the Netherlands coach Marco van Basten enough to invite him for his first international matches. As he was only playing at AZ for a youth contract, various sides were interested to offer the player more playing time. AZ were keen to offer him a new and improved contract, however Vlaar had no interest in staying at AZ as he felt blackmailed by AZ coach Louis van Gaal: "He told me I would only play at emergencies if I wouldn't sign the new contract". In response, coach van Gaal denied the player's claims and was fined as a result. Vlaar was close to a deal with Ajax and was spotted in London, as he was visiting Martin Jol's Tottenham Hotspur with his father and agent. However, on 28 December 2005, Vlaar signed a three-and-a-half-year deal with Feyenoord. He later reflected on decision on rejecting Tottenham Hotspur, saying: "When I was twenty years old I could go to Ajax, PSV and Tottenham", Vlaar tells De Telegraaf . "I went to Tottenham twice. I did not do it, in consultation with my parents, and now I have this experience at Aston Villa I know that I have made the right choice. Now I come in like a big boy."

=== Feyenoord ===
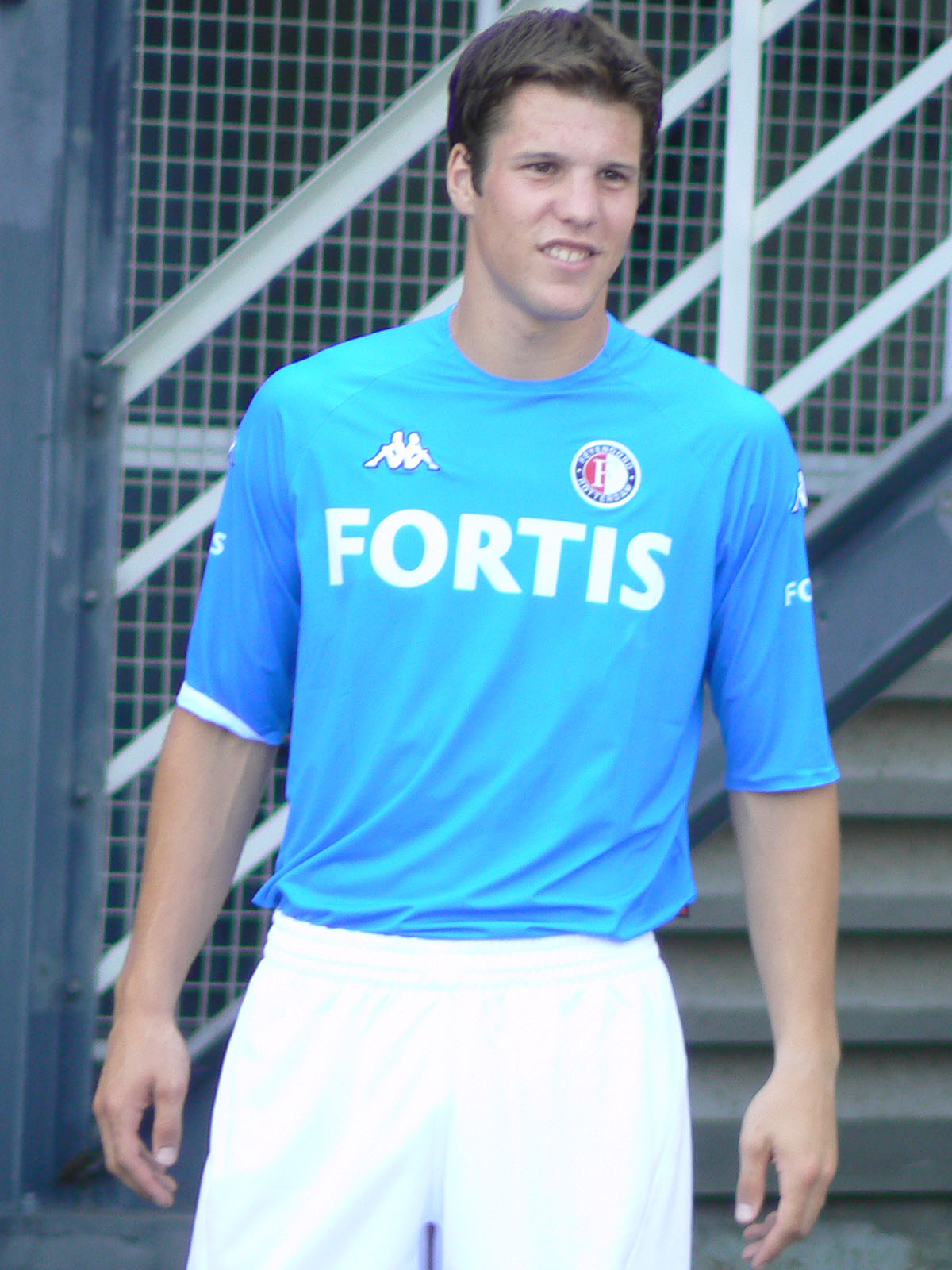
Vlaar pictured during his time at Feyenoord.

After being given a number twenty shirt, Vlaar made his official Feyenoord debut on 15 January 2006, in the away match against Vitesse Arnhem, as the club won 1–0. After the match, he said: "It was not bad, but there is always room for improvement. I have to calm down a bit on the ball and I still have to get used to my fellow players. In any case, it is nice that we won here, for the first time in the history of the club. Much has been said and written about what has happened in recent months. I now want to leave that behind. I feel very free at the moment, both in practice and in the games. It is going very well. I am relaxed, in a good way. That is very pleasant." Vlaar helped Feyenoord keep a clean sheet in the next two matches against Roda JC and Heracles Almelo. Since joining the club, he quickly became a first team starter, forming a centre–back partnership with André Bahia. In his first match against his former club, AZ Alkmaar, on 19 March 2006, Vlaar was booed by AZ Alkmaar throughout the match whenever he touched the ball, as Feyenoord lost 1–0. Vlaar then played in both leg of the play-offs round against rivals’ Ajax, as the club lost 7–2 on aggregate; during which, he was at fault for conceding the first goal of the game in the return leg. Despite the loss, his contributions at Feyenoord saw the club qualify for the UEFA Cup next season. At the end of the 2005–06 season, Vlaar played 16 Eredivisie matches after his winter break transfer, without scoring any goals.

Vlaar had a bad start of the 2006–07 season, as he got foot injury in the pre-season match against Reading, as Feyenoord lost 2–1. At first it seemed to be a minor injury, but Vlaar had to drop out in the 33rd minute of the season opening away match, in a 3–0 loss against FC Groningen. The doctors found a crack in a bone in his foot, causing Vlaar to be out for almost the entire first half of the season. By late–November, it was announced on Feyenoord website that he was declared fit to return from injury. Following this, Vlaar made his return from injury, playing for Jong Feyenoord and played over an hour, in a 3–0 win against Den Bosch on 4 December 2006. He made his first league appearance in four months for the club, coming on as a second-half substitute, in a 3–1 win against ADO Den Haag on 10 December 2006. Three days later on 13 December 2006, Vlaar made his first start for Feyenoord and played the whole game, in a 3–1 win against Wisła Kraków in the UEFA Cup. In a follow–up match, he scored his first goal for the club in the away match, in a 2– 1 loss against Utrecht on 16 December 2006. After his recovery, Vlaar regained his place in the first team, forming a partnership with Bahia. He then helped Feyenoord keep three consecutive clean sheets in three matches between 11 March 2007 and 1 April 2007. Vlaar played in both legs of the league play–offs for a place in the UEFA Cup next season against Groningen, as the club lost 3–1 on aggregate. At the end of the 2006–07 season, he went on to make twenty–three appearances (twenty Eredivisie matches) and scoring once in all competitions.

With the arrival of the new Feyenoord coach Bert van Marwijk and new centre back partner Kevin Hofland in the 2007–08 season, Vlaar was ready to make the next step in his development. He started the season well by helping the club keep a clean sheet in the first three league matches. During which, Vlaar scored his first goal of the season, in a 5–0 win against NAC Breda on 26 August 2007. However, on 16 September 2007, he was injured in the Eredivisie away match against Roda JC and was substituted in the 41st minute, as Feyenoord won 3–1. Vlaar needed a surgery on the cruciate ligament and was out for the rest of the season. After the surgery, Vlaar was confronted with an additional setback, as he had a bacterial infection. While on the sidelines, Vlaar signed a contract extension with the club, keeping him until 2012. Shortly after signing a contract with Feyenoord, he said: "I'm going to do everything I can to be at the first training session on July 5th. The only thing I don't do is fight duels. But otherwise things are going very well. I am pleased with the confidence expressed in this new contract. It gives me a helping hand." At the end of the 2007–08 season, Vlaar went on to make four appearances and scoring once in all competitions.

Vlaar recovered from his injury at the beginning of the 2008–09 season, having returned to the training field with Feyenoord since May 2008 in order to regain his fitness. However, during pre-season, he got another injury at a medial collateral ligament of his knee. But Vlaar returned from injury and was featured in a number of friendly matches throughout the club's pre–season. After an innocent coming together with Kevin Hofland, he damaged his cruciate ligament again. It was the same injury Vlaar had in the previous season, causing him to miss a complete season again. While on the sidelines, he had a successful operation on his knee. In June 2009, he made his return to training after a long absent. Vlaar said about his recovery: "Yes, that was not a nice prospect. I immediately realized that I had to miss an entire season again. That was quite a difficult period for me, especially since I couldn't do anything in the first weeks. I had to wait eight weeks before I could have an operation, because the fluid had to get out of the knee. Did I think my career was in danger? No, not. I'm a positive person. I have become a bit harder anyway. Towards myself, but also towards others. You have to become a little more selfish, only focus on your own troubles. That is why it was nice that I was in Zeist, far away from the club, on my recovery. That way you take some distance, after a while I felt more of a supporter of Feyenoord than a player."

After being sidelined for two seasons, Vlaar made his return from injury, appearing in a number of friendly matches in Feyenoord's pre–season, as he was making his progress on regaining his fitness to fight for his place in the first team. Vlaar made a strong comeback in the 2009–10 season when he helped the club keep four clean sheets in a row. Once Vlaar returned, he formed a strong partnership with Brazilian centre back André Bahia. His performance earned praises with his imposing body and impressive displays. Vlaar was also appointed as Feyenoord's third choice captain. He then scored his first goal of the season, scoring from a 60-meter distance goal in the KNVB Cup away, in a 5–0 win against Harkemase Boys in the second round of the KNVB Beker on 24 September 2009. This was followed up by helping Feyenoord keep a clean sheet in the next two matches. His next goal for the club came on 29 November 2009 against ADO Den Haag, scoring from a header, in a 2–0. Vlaar then scored his third goal of the season, scoring from a free kick and turns out to be the winning goal, in a 3–2 win against Groningen on 28 February 2010. He scored two more goals later in the 2009–10 season against Heracles Almelo and Vitesse. During a 3–0 win against Sparta Rotterdam on 14 April 2010, Vlaar suffered a hamstring injury and was substituted in the 16th minute. He then played in both legs of KNVB Cup Final against rivals' Ajax, as Feyenoord lost 6–1 on aggregate. Despite suffering injuries on three occasions later in the 2009–10 season, Vlaar went on to make thirty–nine appearances and scoring five times in all competitions. For his performance, he was named Voetbal International's Team of the Season.

Ahead of the 2010–11 season, Vlaar was linked away from Feyenoord, with Bundesliga side Werder Bremen and Süper Lig side Bursaspor wanted to sign him, but he ended up staying at the club. By the start of the 2010–11 season, Vlaar was appointed as Feyenoord captain, following Giovanni van Bronckhorst's retirement. He started in the centre–back position, partnering with Stefan de Vrij in the club's first five league matches of the season. During which, Vlaar scored his first goal of the season, scoring from a header, in a 3–2 loss against Excelsior on 15 August 2010. However, during a 2–1 loss against Ajax on 19 September 2010, he suffered a hamstring injury and was substituted at half time. After the match, it was announced that the player would be out between four and six weeks. Vlaar previously suffered the same injury during Feyenoord's pre–season but he quickly recovered after his injury was not serious as first thought. On 7 November 2010, Vlaar made his return from injury, starting the whole game, in a 1–1 draw against Roda JC. Since returning from injury, he continued to regain his first team place, forming a centre–back partnership with de Vrij, as well as, captain. After suffering an injury in the previous match, Vlaar was able to contribute the match against ADO Den Haag when he set up two goals, in a 2–2 draw on 20 February 2011. This was followed up by scoring his second goal of the season, in a 5–1 win against FC Groningen. However, during a 3–1 win against PSV Eindhoven on 24 April 2011, Vlaar suffered a calf injury and was substituted at half time. After the match, it was announced that he would be out for the rest of the 2010–11 season. At the end of the 2010–11 season, Vlaar went on to make twenty–eight appearances and scoring two times in all competitions.

After speculation over his future at Feyenoord, it was announced on 27 June 2011 that Vlaar signed a contract with the club, keeping him until 2014. He also switched number shirt from twenty to four ahead of the new season. Vlaar was among thirteen players to lose confidence in Mario Been, prompting him to resign as Manager of Feyenoord, leading Ronald Koeman being appointed as Been's successor. At the start of the 2011–12 season, he continued to establish himself in the first team, forming a centre–back partnership with de Vrij, as well as, retaining his captaincy. Vlaar then scored his first goal of the season, in a 2–1 loss against Go Ahead Eagles in the third round of the KNVB Beker on 27 October 2011. He said about the club's recent performance, saying: "We have all been through a lot. But you also have to make that stronger, you get a thicker skin. You have to post that. Last year we experienced a lot of negative things and a lot happened at the beginning of this season. Then you get a lot over you and you have to give it a place. If you now fall back in results, you have to arm yourself against it. Then there has to be a switch." Later in the 2011–12 season, Vlaar played a key role in reaching second place in the Eredivisie with the club, securing a spot in the third qualifying round of the 2012–13 UEFA Champions League. Despite facing injuries during the 2011–12 season, he played in every match in the league, making twenty–six appearances and scoring once in all competitions. Reflecting on the season, Vlaar said: "It says a lot about our qualities that we know how to win such top competitions. We have demanded more from each other this season. The trainers also played an important role in this. Fortunately, we also had few injuries. No, second place does not result in a cup or bowl. But this is a wonderful reward for all the people who have worked very hard to get Feyenoord back to the top. I signed up last year because I wanted to create something with this club. That has already been achieved with this second place. But we can take one more step. You always have to look ahead."

Ahead of the 2012–13 season, Vlaar said he's expecting to stay at Feyenoord and continued to help the club with their success. But Vlaar continued to be linked away from Feyenoord, with European clubs, such as, Fiorentina and Genoa were interested in signing him. In response to the speculation, the club technical director Martin van Geel announced their intention not to sell the player. Vlaar responded to the transfer speculation, while facing uncertainties over his future with Feyenoord, he wanted to stay at the club and helped them win the league ahead of the new season. On 15 July 2012, Feyenoord confirmed that Vlaar had travelled to Birmingham to hold talks with Aston Villa manager Paul Lambert with a view to a possible transfer. Responding to the transfer speculation, manager Lambert confirmed his interests in signing the player. During Villa's pre-season tour of the United States, however, Vlaar admitted that the deal was off and he would remain with Feyenoord. In another turn of events, it was then announced on 27 July that Vlaar would eventually be joining the Premier League side, as he had agreed personal terms and would sign for Villa subject to him passing a medical.

=== Aston Villa ===
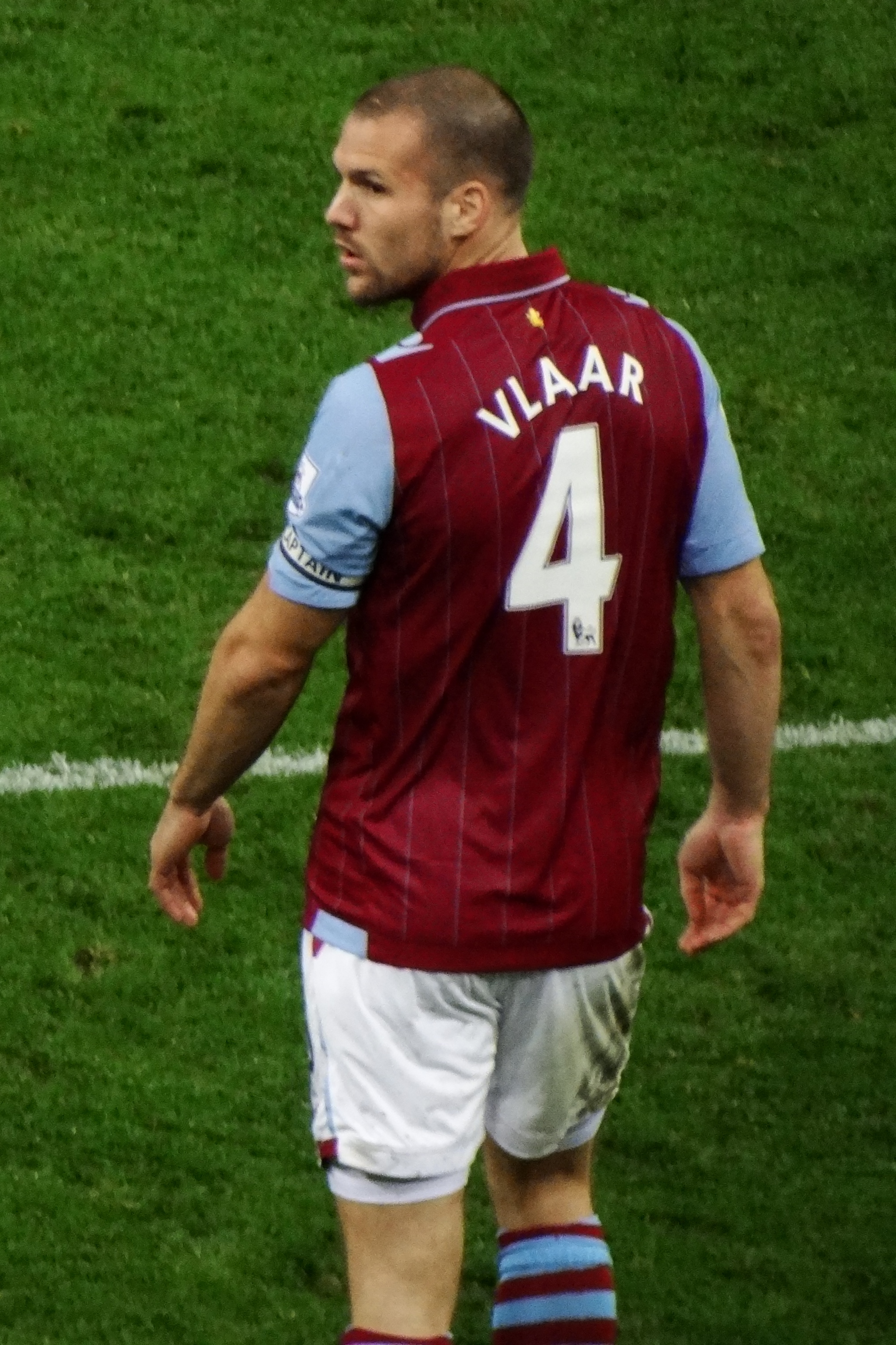
Vlaar playing for Aston Villa in November 2014.

On 1 August 2012, Vlaar officially joined Aston Villa, signing a three-year contract. Shortly after joining Aston Villa and was given a number four shirt, Vlaar spoke out on the club's website about his adapting in the country and aim to be a cult hero among supporters. He made his Aston Villa debut, starting the whole game, in a 1–0 loss against West Ham United in the opening game of the season. After a bad start, it was announced on 15 September 2012 that Vlaar was named captain for the 2012–13 season in the continued absence of club captain Stiliyan Petrov, as the Bulgarian battled cancer. His first game as captain resulted in Aston Villa's first win of the season, a 2–0 win over Swansea City on 15 September 2012. He then spoke about his responsibility as a captain but faced new challenges as a captain in "a different league, different language and different culture." In the first thirteen league matches of the season, Vlaar established himself in the centre–back position, forming a partnership with Ciaran Clark. However, he suffered a calf injury during a match against Arsenal on 24 November 2012 and was substituted in the 51st minute, as Aston Villa drew 0–0. After a scan, Vlaar was out for two months with the injury. On 19 January 2013, he made his return to the starting line–up against West Bromwich Albion and helped the club draw 2–2. However, after making five starts for Aston Villa, Vlaar suffered a calf injury while in training and missed two matches as a result. But he made his return to the starting line–up against Reading on 9 March 2013 and helped the club win 2–1. Following his return from injury, Vlaar regained his first team place for the rest of the 2012–13 season, forming a partnership with Clark and helping Aston Villa fight for survival to avoid relegation in the Premier League. On 29 April 2013, he scored his first goal for the club with a 30-yard strike in a 6–1 victory over Sunderland. In a match against already relegated Wigan Athletic in the last game of the season, Vlaar scored his second goal for Aston Villa, scoring from a spectacular half-volley from just inside the penalty area, in a 2–2 draw away. At the end of the 2012–13 season, he went on to make thirty–one appearances and scoring two times in all competitions. Reflecting on his first season at the club, Vlaar said while avoiding relegation in the Premier League, he does expect the youngsters in the team that they must learn from their mistakes and hoping that Aston Villa does not found themselves in the relegation zone next season. However, Vlaar later said: "It wasn't an easy season. It was my first season in the Premier League and at Aston Villa, but I could do better I think. I expect more from myself. When we have a new season, I think it's going to be better. I'm never completely satisfied with the way I play, I always look for things to improve. I want to be better in personal battles, I want to win more headers, I want to make less mistakes. I just need to be better. I think with practice you can do a lot. You train like you play so it's 100 per cent every day."

In the opening game of the 2013–14 season, Vlaar started the season well when he captained the whole game and helped Aston Villa beat Arsenal 3–1. Since the start of the 2013–14 season, Vlaar continued to be in the first team, forming a centre–back partnership with either Clark, Nathan Baker and Jores Okore. He then contributed to helping the club keep three clean sheets out of the four league matches throughout November. Manager Lambert praised Vlaar's performance and believed that he should be included in the FIFA World Cup squad. In a match against Southampton on 4 December 2013, Vlaar suffered a calf injury and was substituted at half time, as the club won 3–2. After missing five matches, he returned to the starting line–up against Sunderland on 1 January 2014, only to be suffer an injury and was substituted in the 70th minute. After missing only match, Vlaar returned to the starting line–up against Arsenal on 13 January 2014, as Aston Villa lost 2–1. He started two more matches before suffering a hamstring injury during a 2–1 loss against Everton on 1 February 2014 and was substituted in the 80th minute. After being on the sidelines for ten days with the injury, Vlaar returned to the starting line–up against Cardiff CIty on 11 February 2014 and helped the club keep a clean sheet, in a 0–0 draw. After the match, manager Lambert said: "I think there might be a chance. I'll have to see how he feels. You cannot risk it. He's got to feel himself if he can play and if he's comfortable and thinks he can play then you have to look at it. Ron being out is a bitter blow." Following this, he regained his first team place, playing in the centre–back position for the rest of the 2013–14 season and helped Aston Villa avoid relegation once again by finishing fifteenth place. At the end of the 2013–14 season, Vlaar went on to make thirty–four appearances in all competitions.

Ahead of the 2014–15 season, Vlaar said his new target for the new season is to help Aston Villa to win silverware. For his performance in the FIFA World Cup, Vlaar was linked away from the club, with clubs, such as, Queens Park Rangers and Lazio were interested in signing him. Following talks with manager Lambert, he ended up staying at Aston Villa. Vlaar started the 2014–15 season well when he helped the club make a good start to win the first three league matches of the season. However, Vlaar suffered a calf injury during a 2–1 win against Hull City on 31 August 2014 and was sidelined for a month. On 18 October 2014, he made his return to the starting line–up against Everton and played the whole game, as Aston Villa lost 3–0. However, his return was short–lived when Vlaar suffered a calf injury while on international duty and was sidelined for weeks. Vlaar made his return to the first team from injury, coming on as a 78th-minute substitute, in a 1–0 loss against West Bromwich Albion on 13 December 2014. Once again, his return was short–lived when he suffered a knee injury during a 0–0 draw against Crystal Palace on 1 January 2015 and was substituted in the 15th minute. After the match, it was announced that Vlaar would be out for six weeks. While on the sidelines, he was linked with a move away from the club, with Juventus, Liverpool and Manchester United wanted to sign him. In response, Manager Lambert said Aston Villa will not sell Vlaar in the January transfer window, which, he agreed and announcing his intention to see out his contract. Vlaar made his return to the starting line–up against Leicester City in the fifth round of the FA Cup on 15 February 2015 and set up the first goal of the game, in a 2–1 win. In a follow–up match against Stoke City, he was sent–off for a second bookable offence, in a 2–1 loss. Shortly after serving his suspension, Vlaar suffered a calf injury that saw him out for a month. He made his return to the starting line–up and played the whole game, in a 3–3 draw against Queens Park Rangers on 7 April 2015. Vlaar then relinquished his captaincy role to Fabian Delph for the rest of the 2014–15 season and played his first match without an armband, in a 2–1 win against Liverpool in the semi–finals of the FA Cup. Following this, he formed a central defence partnership with Jores Okore and the pair even played together in the 2015 FA Cup Final at Wembley Stadium, where the team were defeated 4–0 by Arsenal on 30 May 2015. At the end of the 2014–15 season, Vlaar went on to make twenty–three appearances in all competitions.

With his contract expiring at the end of the 2014–15 season, Vlaar's future at Aston Villa was speculated on whether he would stay or not by offering him a new contract. Vlaar spoke out on two separate occasions that he wanted to stay at the club. After delays of a contract negotiations, it was reported on 8 June 2015 that Vlaar was offered a new contract by Aston Villa. However, he declined the contract offer from the club, leaving him a free agent.

During his time at Aston Villa, Vlaar earned a nickname ‘Concrete Ron’ by his teammates. He was a fan favourite among Aston Villa supporters, who chanted: ‘Ooh aah Ron Vlaar’.

=== Return to AZ ===
Following his release by Aston Villa, Vlaar was linked with a move return to Feyenoord and even offered him a rehabilitation program after he was out for between three and four months following a surgery. By October, however, the club let him go and later stated his disappointment of the decision. Vlaar, once again, was linked with a move to his former club, AZ Alkmaar and Everton. On 7 December 2015, he joined AZ Alkmaar for the second time on a deal running until the end of the 2015–16 season.

In order to regain his fitness, Vlaar appeared in a match for Jong AZ, starting a match and playing 61 minutes, in a 4–1 win against Jong SC Cambuur on 14 December 2015. He made his second debut for the club, starting the whole game, in a 2–2 draw against Utrecht on 19 December 2015. Since joining AZ Alkmaar, Vlaar quickly established himself in the first team, forming a centre–back partnership with either Derrick Luckassen and Stijn Wuytens. He, at times, captained for the club on four occasions in the absence of Jeffrey Gouweleeuw. Vlaar then scored his first goal for AZ Alkmaar, scoring the second goal of the game, in a 4–1 win against FC Groningen on 20 February 2016. On the last game of the season, he helped the club beat FC Utrecht 3–1 to secure a place in the UEFA Europa League next season. Despite being sidelined an injury later in the 2015–16 season, Vlaar went on to make nineteen appearances and scoring once in all competitions. Following this, he signed a new two-year deal with AZ Alkmaar on 9 May 2016.

Ahead of the 2016–17 season, Vlaar switched number shirt to four and was appointed as AZ Alkmaar's captain. At the start of the 2016–17 season, he started the season well for AZ Alkmaar by helping the club win all four of their matches against PAS Giannina and FK Vojvodina in the UEFA Europa League to reach the group stage. Vlaar then helped AZ Alkmaar keep a clean sheet in three matches between 28 August 2016 and 18 September 2016. However, he suffered a calf injury and was substituted in the 57th minute during a 5–0 loss UEFA Europa League match against Zenit Saint Petersburg on 29 September 2016. After being sidelined for three weeks with the injury, Vlaar made his return to the starting line–up against FC Groningen on 23 October 2016, only to suffer another calf injury and was substituted in the 69th minute. A week later on 3 November 2016, he made his return to the starting line–up against Maccabi Tel Aviv in the UEFA Europa League and helped the club keep a clean sheet, in a 0–0 draw. Vlaar then started in the next four matches before suffering a calf injury that saw him out for two months. After being out for two months, he returned to the starting line–up against Lyon in the second leg of the UEFA Europa League Round of 32 on 23 February 2017 and played the whole game, as AZ Alkmaar lost 7–1 and was out of the tournament. Following this, Vlaar regained his first team place, playing in the centre–back position, competing with Rens van Eijden and Luckassen, as well as, retaining his captaincy, but he faced his fitness along the way. In the KNVB Cup Final, Vlaar started in the match against Vitesse, as the club lost 2–0. Vlaar played all four matches in the league's play–offs for a spot in the UEFA Europa League, as AZ Alkmaar lost on penalties against Utrecht following a 3–3 draw on aggregate. Reflecting on his first full season at the club, saying: "I am disappointed in this season and also in my own season. It has not turned out what I hoped it would be. We will have to consult ourselves because we can do much better. We have shown that far too little. It is difficult to process this disappointment, but we have to move on…" At the end of the 2016–17 season, Vlaar went on to make thirty–four appearances in all competitions.

Ahead of 2017–18 season, Vlaar said: "I had an unpleasant season. During a good holiday I thought a lot and had conversations with my girlfriend and friends. Like last season, I don't want to go again: struggling with injuries and form. It was often just not good enough. Everything was just not. I didn't think football was good enough either. AZ wants to play more attacking football and provide more spectacle. It has been changeable, that is something that should be out of our game. We are working on something new. That also takes time. Disappointments will also come. It is important to realize that we are doing it with a team, and not with eleven men. We need everyone. Everyone has to fight for a place and that improves the level." At the start of the 2017–18 season, he continued to form a centre–back partnership with Wuytens, as well as, the club's captain role for the first six league matches of the season. However, he suffered a knee injury while training and was sidelined for the rest of the year. Having recovered from his injury, Vlaar, however, found himself placed on the substitute bench for a month, due to the centre–back partnership of Pantelis Chatzidiakos and Wuytens. He then played his first match since returning from injury for Jong AZ against Fortuna Sittard on 12 February 2018 and played 59 minutes before being substituted, as they won 2–0. Five days later on 17 February 2018, Vlaar made his first league appearance in five months, coming on as an 80th-minute substitute, in a 3–1 win against NAC Breda. Following this, he spoke about his fitness, saying: "I am in good shape, I am fit. I have to wait patiently for my chance. I have to get into match rhythm myself. I played for an hour once, and ten minutes and 45 minutes at the first time. Today was ninety minutes of play." Vlaar returned to the duty as captain when he made his first starts in six months against ADO Den Haag on 31 March 2018 and helped the club keep a clean sheet, in a 3–0 win. In a follow–up match against PSV Eindhoven, Vlaar received a red card for a second bookable offence, in a 3–2 loss. After the match, AZ Alkmaar successfully appealed his suspension. Vlaar started in the KNVB Cup Final against his former club Feyenoord as captain, as the club lost 2–0, making a second time that AZ Alkmaar lost two finals in a row for tha player. During the match, he received a standing ovation from his former club Feyenoord. At the end of the 2017–18 season, Vlaar went on to make fifteen appearances in all competitions. Reflecting on the season, he said: "Of course I imagined it differently. Whatever situation I was in, I have never been disappointed. I've always kept going. I would have liked to play more and be fitter. The moment I was fit again, the team was just fine. Then I had to be patient. I accelerated the training. Not just for myself, but also for the other guys who did play. Competition makes you better. It's about the club. That has not cost me any effort and I have never been frustrated about it."

Having ruled out retirement, Vlaar stayed at AZ Alkmaar by signing a one–year contract extension, keeping him until 2019. Due to his injury concern, he relinquished his captaincy role to Guus Til. Vlaar was featured in the first two months of the 2018–19 season, forming a centre–back partnership with Chatzidiakos. This lasted until he missed two matches, due to an injury. But Vlaar made his return to the first team from injury, starting a match and playing 57 minutes before being substituted, in a 2–2 draw against PEC Zwolle on 30 September 2018. After being dropped to the substitute bench for the next two matches, he then regained his first team place and started in the next three matches. However, Vlaar missed two matches, due to his fitness concern. But he made his return from injury, starting the whole game and helped the club keep a clean sheet, in a 2–0 win against Fortuna Sittard on 7 December 2018. Following this, Vlaar continued to regain his first team place, forming a centre–back partnership with either Chatzidiakos and Teun Koopmeiners. He helped AZ Alkmaar keep six clean sheets between 19 January 2019 and 16 February 2019. The club's six consecutive clean sheets ended against Willem II on 24 February 2019 when Vlaar and Marco Bizot had a miscommunication, resulting in Marios Vrousai capitalising the mistakes to score, as AZ Alkmaar lost 2–1. He was able to amend his mistakes by helping the club keep three clean sheets in three matches between 10 March 2019 and 30 March 2019. During which, Vlaar scored the only goal of the game and helped AZ Alkmaar keep a clean sheet, in a 1–0 win against FC Groningen on 30 March 2019. This was followed up by scoring his second goal of the season, in a 2–2 draw against Vitesse. He later helped club qualify for the UEFA Europa League next season after beating PSV Eindhoven 1–0 on 12 May 2019. At the end of the 2018–19 season, Vlaar went on to make thirty–four appearances and scoring two times in all competitions. Following this, he signed a one–year contract extension with AZ Alkmaar.

At the start of the 2019–20 season, Vlaar started the season well when he helped the club keep six clean sheets in the first six matches, including four UEFA Europa League matches against BK Häcken and FC Mariupol. During which, Vlaar scored in the opening game of the season, in a 4–0 win against Fortuna Sittard. After missing one match due to his fitness concern, he played in both legs of the UEFA Europa League play–offs round against Royal Antwerp, as AZ Alkmaar won 6–2 on aggregate. Following this, Vlaar found himself in and out of the starting line–up for the club in the first three months to the season. He then scored his second goal of the season, scoring from a header, in a 4–2 loss against Heerenveen on 19 October 2019. However, Vlaar suffered a calf injury that saw him out for a month. But he made his return from injury against Manchester United in the UEFA Europa League match on 12 December 2019, coming on as a 68th-minute substitute, in a 4–0 loss. However, his return was short–lived when Vlaar suffered a calf injury that saw him out for weeks. He made his return from injury, playing in a friendly match against Mechelen on 10 January 2020, starting a match and playing 45 minutes before being substituted, in a 5–1 win. Vlaar then started in the next three matches for AZ Alkmaar. However, his return was short–lived when he suffered a muscle injury that saw him out for a month before the season was curtailed with the club finishing fourth place in the league because of the COVID-19 pandemic. At the end of the 2019–20 season, Vlaar went on to make twenty appearances and scoring two times in all competitions. Initially, his contract was formally canceled, though AZ Alkmaar continued to discuss with the player over a new contract. On 12 June 2020, he signed a one–year contract extension with the club, having ruled out of retirement once again.

Ahead of the 2020–21 season, Vlaar continued to recover from his muscle injury. But he recovered and made an appearance in a friendly match against SC Telstar on 21 August 2020, coming on as a 66th-minute substitute, in a 1–1 draw. Vlaar made two more appearances, both coming from the UEFA Europa League. However, he suffered a muscle injury once again and was sidelined for the next five months. On 10 February 2021, due to physical problems, Vlaar announced his retirement from professional football, ending his seventeen years as a footballer.

== International career ==
=== Youth ===
Having represented Netherlands U19, Vlaar was called up to the Netherlands U20 team for the 2005 FIFA World Youth Championship took place in the Netherlands between 10 June and 2 July 2005. Vlaar, reserve captain behind Hedwiges Maduro, was an important player in the Dutch team and was active in every match the team played on the tournament. Netherlands U20 had a smooth run through the group stage, winning their three matches respectively easy against Japan U20 (2–1), Australia U20 (3–0) and Benin U20 (1–0). After beating Chile U20 (3–0) in the next round, the Netherlands U20 reached the quarter-finals against later finalist Nigeria U20, which they lost 10–9 on penalty shootout following a 1–1 draw at Extra time. Despite Vlaar's equalizing goal and successful penalty kick, the Netherlands U20 didn't advance to the next stage.

In May 2006, Vlaar was called up to the Netherlands U21 for the first time. He made his debut for the U21 national team against Germany U21, starting a match and playing 45 minutes before being substituted, in a 2–2 draw on 17 May 2006. Vlaar was part of the Netherlands U21 on the 2006 UEFA European Under-21 Championship, where the Dutch side claimed the trophy for the first time in history. Besides being an unused substitute in a 1–1 draw against Denmark U21 in the group match, he played in every match on the tournament. Jong Oranje started and finished their campaign against Ukraine U21, going out on a high with a 3–0 win in the final, after surprisingly losing their opening game to the Ukrainian team.

Following the tournament, Vlaar was called up to the Netherlands U21 squad on 2 February 2007. He captained the U21 national team for the first team and helped them keep a clean sheet, in a 3–0 win against Russia U21 on 6 February 2007. Vlaar then captained Netherlands U21 in the next two matches against Czech Republic U21 and Republic of Ireland U21. Twelve months after winning the UEFA European Under-21 Championship for the first time, he was called up to the Netherlands U21 squad once again for the tournament. Vlaar played in every match in the group stage and was the captain of the U21 national team. He had to leave the pitch injured in the semi-final match against England U21, as the U21 national team won 13–12 on penalty shootout following a 1–1 draw at extra time). Vlaar had to watch the final from the sideline, as Netherlands U21 retained the trophy in style with a 4–1 win against Serbia U21 in the final and he was able to lift the trophy together with reserve captain Hedwiges Maduro.

In the months to building up to the 2008 Olympic Games in Beijing, China, Vlaar was appointed as the ambassador for both Netherlands Olympics and the Netherlands Paralympic teams, along with Edith Bosch. However, he was replaced by Kees Luijckx due to his injury. Vlaar said on Feyenoord's column that he's determined to make it to the Netherlands squad for the Olympics. On 6 June 2008, Vlaar was included in the 36 man preliminary squad selection. However a month later, he did not make the cut after failing to make it to the 23 man squad. Reflecting on being dropped to the squad, Vlaar said: "Yes, I know. Participating in the Olympics can be once in a lifetime. After I tore my cruciate ligament, it was not realistic to go to Beijing. In terms of time schedule I could have made it. Physically I am as good as fit, but I don't have any rhythm. Then in all fairness you have to make a decision to stay at home in the interests of the team and yourself. Foppe de Haan would not be of much use to me and the long term at Feyenoord is simply more important than the short one."

=== Netherlands ===
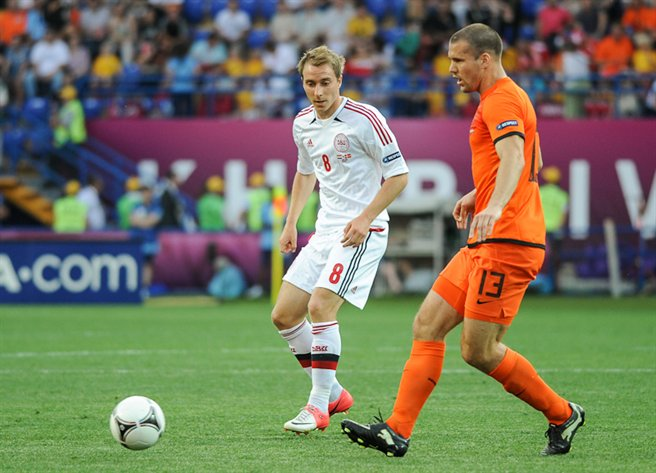
Vlaar (right) making a pass as, Denmark's Christian Eriksen looked on at the UEFA Euro 2012.

In the few matches the promising defender played, Vlaar made enough of an impression to be noticed by Marco van Basten, the coach of the Netherlands national team. He was selected for the qualifier against Romania in June 2005, but did not play. The first international match in which Vlaar played was a match against the Czech Republic, coming on as a 57th-minute substitute, in a 2–0 win on 8 October 2005. A month later on 12 November 2005, he made another appearance for the senior national team, starting a match and playing 60 minutes before being substituted, in a 3–1 loss against Italy. Following this, Vlaar did not earn a call up from the Netherlands squad.

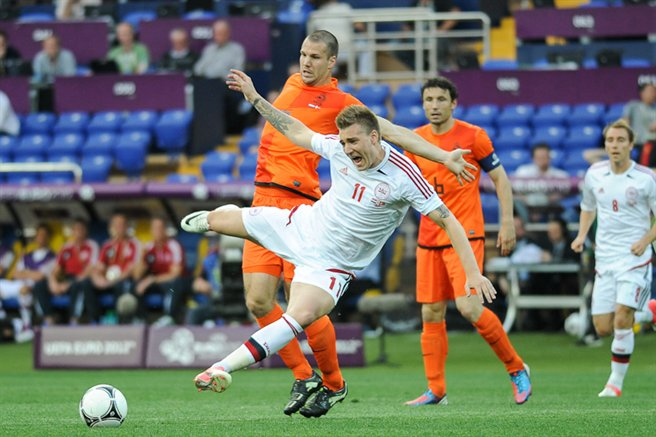
Vlaar tackling Denmark's Nicklas Bendtner at the UEFA Euro 2012.

Since his comeback for Feyenoord, he became a first-choice regular in the club team and his appearances for Feyenoord were noticed by the national team coach Bert van Marwijk, who officially stated to be following him in the run-up to the IFA World Cup in South Africa. However, not yet calling Vlaar to the national team, due to the severity of his previous injuries, allowing him to gradually come to full fitness and preventing overuse of muscles since Vlaar only came back to first team football in the summer of 2009. However, van Marwijk stated he would seriously consider calling Vlaar up in the second half of the season. In February 2010, van Marwijk was called up the player for the first time in almost five years. He made his first appearance in five years, coming on as a second-half substitute, in a 2–1 win against USA on 3 March 2010. Two months later, Vlaar was included in the preliminary squad for the 2010 FIFA World Cup in South Africa. However, he suffered a leg injury while training. Shortly after, Vlaar said he remain optimistic to make it to the squad. However, on 27 May 2010, Netherlands manager Bert van Marwijk announced that Vlaar would not be part of the final squad of 23 participating in the competition.

Following the end of the World Cup tournament, Vlaar was called up to the national team squad once again on 9 August 2010. He captained his first match for Netherlands against Ukraine on 11 August 2010 and started the whole game to help the national side draw 1–1. He then spent the next eighteen months being placed on the substitute bench and didn't play for Netherlands as a result. This lasted until 29 February 2012 when Vlaar made an appearance, coming on as an 82nd-minute substitute, in a 3–2 win against England. On 7 May 2012, he was named in the provisional list of 36 players for the UEFA Euro 2012 tournament by van Marwijk. After speaking out his determination to be in the squad ahead of the tournament, Vlaar eventually made the cut for the 23 man squad. On 2 June 2012, he scored his first international goal with a header from a corner kick by Ibrahim Afellay, the last goal in a 6–0 friendly win over Northern Ireland. Vlaar made his first appearance of the UEFA Euro tournament, forming a centre–back partnership with John Heitinga, in a 1–0 loss against Denmark on 9 June 2012. After being dropped to the substitute bench in the next match against Germany, he returned to the starting line–up against Portugal, as the national team lost 2–1 on 17 June 2012, resulting in them finishing bottom of their group. Following the end of the tournament, Vlaar reflected on the experience, saying: "I already had the feeling that I was close to it. I've had good weeks here. But I can't be satisfied with that now. I am disappointed because you are a sportsman and you want to perform. Later I may be able to look back on this European Championship in a more positive way for me personally."

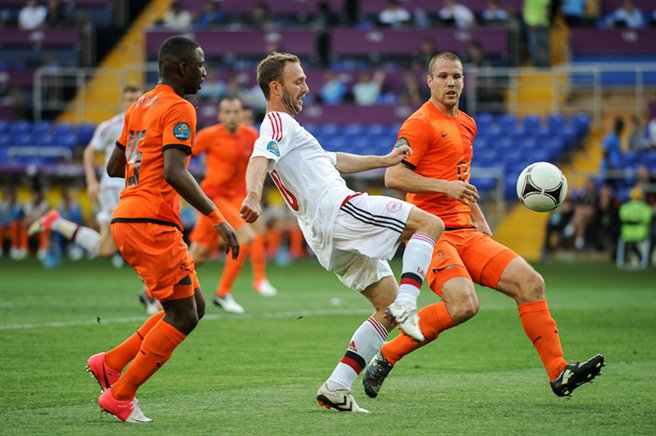
Vlaar looked on, as Denmark's Christian Eriksen took a shot at the UEFA Euro 2012.

Following the end of the UEFA Euro tournament, Vlaar was Louis van Gaal's first-choice centre–back for Netherlands for FIFA World Cup qualification Group D matches for the rest of 2012. Between January and September 2013, he rotated in and out of the starting line–up for the national team, due to facing competitions in the centre–backs. But Vlaar regained his place for Netherlands and helped the national team qualify for the FIFA World Cup after beating Andorra 2–0 on 10 September 2013. In the months leading to the tournament, he remain as Netherlands’ first choice centre–back. In May 2014, Vlaar, who was disappointed to not being included in the squad for the tournament in Germany eight years ago, was finally included in the squad for the World Cup 2014 in Brazil. On 31 May 2014, he made the cut to be included in the 23 man squad. Vlaar made his tournament debut on Matchday 1 of the group stage against Spain on 13 June 2014 and helped the national team win 5–1. He then became first choice centre–backs, playing alongside former Feyenoord teammates, de Vrij and Bruno Martins Indi and Daley Blind. Vlaar received much credit for leading the defence and his contributions led Netherlands not losing any matches in the normal time, with the Vlaar-headed defence conceding just four goals. In the semi-final against Argentina, he took the first penalty kick, after being one of the best players on the field throughout the official playing time. Vlaar, however, missed, just like Dutch midfielder Wesley Sneijder, which caused the Dutch to lose and face Brazil in the third-place play-off. After a 3–0 win over Brazil, the Netherlands won the bronze medal; Vlaar's biggest achievement as a player for his national team. Throughout the FIFA World Cup tournament, he played all seven matches. Vlaar was ranked tenth place in the FIFA best players in the ranking system.

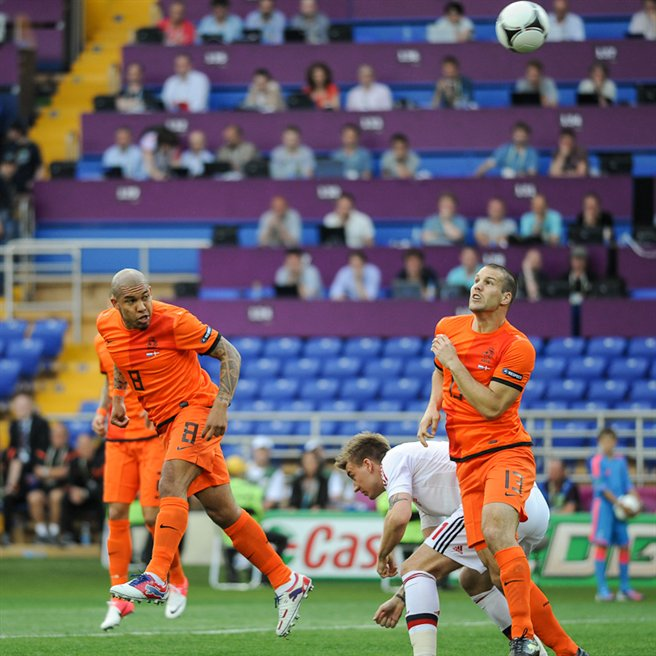
Vlaar and Nigel de Jong looked on, as the ball went wide during a match between Denmark and Netherlands at UEFA Euro 2012.

Following the end of the tournament, Vlaar missed the international duty with Netherlands, due to a calf injury while playing for Aston Villa. After making a recovery from injury, he was called up to the national team on 7 November 2014. Four days later on 11 November 2014, Vlaar made his first appearance for Netherlands in four months, starting a match and playing 24 minutes before being substituted, due to another calf injury, in a 3–2 loss against Mexico, in what turned out to be his last appearance for the national team. Following this, his international chances has been sporadic for the rest of his career, appearing in a number of matches as an unused substitute. He earned 32 caps for Netherlands national side and scoring once during his nine years time there.

== Personal life ==
Vlaar was married to Stephanie in 2010 and has two children. He has a tattoo name of his two children across his chest. However, in 2011, Vlaar and his wife divorced, just months after his wife gave birth to his second child.

In March 2011, Vlaar and his then teammate Luc Castaignos took part in a spinning marathon for the charity, Stichting Luna Sluiter Foundation. In addition to speaking Dutch, he speaks English. It was reported in December 2011 that Vlaar was reported in the Netherlands media, allegeding taking part in a poker game with referee Serdar Gözübüyük. In response, he denied such claims, saying: "It is absolute nonsense. I find it very annoying that it is suggested that poker is being played for big money at my home, poker at all, because that is simply not the case. As the research also showed, nothing came out. I find it very annoying that I get into the news that way and that makes me very disappointed." Outside of football, Vlaar said he plays snooker in his spare time.

Vlaar is good friends with Karim El Ahmadi, which they were first teammates at Feyenoord and then Aston Villa, and helped each other settle in England. Following his retirement from professional football, Vlaar said he wanted to do coaching.

== Career statistics ==
=== Club ===
Appearances and goals by club, season and competition
Club	Season	League			National Cup		League Cup		Europe		Total	
Club	Season	Division	Apps	Goals	Apps	Goals	Apps	Goals	Apps	Goals	Apps	Goals
AZ	2004–05	Eredivisie	3	0	0	0	—		2 (Note: Appearances in the UEFA Cup)	0	5	0
AZ	2005–06	Eredivisie	7	0	0	0	—		2	1	9	1
AZ	Total		10	0	0	0	—		4	1	14	1
Feyenoord	2005–06	Eredivisie	16	0	0	0	—		0	0	16	0
Feyenoord	2006–07	Eredivisie	20	1	0	0	—		1	0	21	1
Feyenoord	2007–08	Eredivisie	4	1	0	0	—		—		4	1
Feyenoord	2008–09	Eredivisie	0	0	0	0	—		0	0	0	0
Feyenoord	2009–10	Eredivisie	32	4	1	1	—		—		33	5
Feyenoord	2010–11	Eredivisie	26	2	0	0	—		2 (Note: Appearances in the Europa League)	0	28	2
Feyenoord	2011–12	Eredivisie	34	0	2	1	—		—		36	1
Feyenoord	Total		136	8	1	1	—		3	0	140	9
Aston Villa	2012–13	Premier League	27	2	1	0	3	0	—		31	2
Aston Villa	2013–14	Premier League	32	0	0	0	2	0	—		34	0
Aston Villa	2014–15	Premier League	20	0	3	0	0	0	—		23	0
Aston Villa	Total		79	2	4	0	5	0	0	0	88	2
AZ	2015–16	Eredivisie	17	1	2	0	—		9	0	28	1
AZ	2016–17	Eredivisie	24	0	1	0	—		0	0	25	0
AZ	2017–18	Eredivisie	12	0	1	0	—		—		13	0
AZ	2018–19	Eredivisie	28	2	4	0	—		2	0	34	2
AZ	2019–20	Eredivisie	10	2	0	0	—		10	0	20	2
AZ	2020–21	Eredivisie	0	0	0	0	—		2	0	2	0
AZ	Total		91	5	8	0	—		23	0	122	5
Career total			316	15	13	1	5	0	30	1	364	17

=== International ===
Netherlands national team
Year	Apps	Goals
2005	2	0
2010	2	0
2012	10	1
2013	7	0
2014	11	0
Total	32	1

Goal	Date	Venue	Opponent	Score	Result	Competition
1	2 June 2012	Amsterdam Arena, Amsterdam, Netherlands	Northern Ireland	6–0	6–0	Friendly

== Honours ==
Feyenoord

- KNVB Cup: 2007–08

Aston Villa

- FA Cup runner-up: 2014–15

Netherlands U21

- UEFA European Under-21 Championship: 2006, 2007

Netherlands

- FIFA World Cup third place: 2014

Individual

- Noord Holland's sports talent of the year: 2005
- RTV Rijnmond Footballer of the Year: 2009
