= Maikel Aerts =

Dutch footballer (born 1976)

Personal information
- Date of birth: 26 June 1976 (age 50)
- Place of birth: Eindhoven, Netherlands
- Height: 1.96 m (6 ft 5 in)
- Position: Goalkeeper

Youth career
- Wilhelmina Boys
- 1988–1994: PSV

Senior career*
Years	Team	Apps	(Gls)
1994–2001	Den Bosch	107	(0)
2001–2002	Germinal Beerschot	9	(0)
2002–2004	RBC Roosendaal	51	(0)
2004–2007	Feyenoord	8	(0)
2004–2005	→ RBC Roosendaal (loan)	21	(0)
2007	→ Willem II	7	(0)
2007–2010	Willem II	81	(0)
2010–2012	Hertha BSC	24	(0)
Total		308	(0)

Managerial career
- 2017–2021: Eindhoven (goalkeeping coach)
- * Club domestic league appearances and goals

Maikel Aerts (Dutch pronunciation: [ˈmɑikəl ˈaːrts]; born 26 June 1976) is a Dutch former professional footballer who played as a goalkeeper. After his career, he became goalkeeping coach.

== Career ==
Aerts started his career at FC Den Bosch. In his third season at Den Bosch, where he was the backup goalkeeper, he was suspended for 12 months by the KNVB after testing positive for cocaine – the first player to face a ban for substance abuse in the Dutch competitions. He ended up making 107 appearances for the club (1994–2001). A subsequent transfer to English club Wolverhampton Wanderers failed to go through due to Aerts refusing to take a drug test. Instead, he moved to Belgian side Germinal Beerschot in 2001, where he only made nine appearances due to an injury. During this period, Aerts' friend was murdered and his fiancé suffered a whiplash after a car accident.

After a horrible year professionally and personally, he returned to the Netherlands, signing with RBC Roosendaal in 2002. There, he established himself as one of the better goalkeepers in the Eredivisie despite suffering a shoulder injury, which kept him sidelined for six months. As a result of his strong displays, Feyenoord signed him on 4 July 2004, who loaned directly back to RBC for another season before joining Feyenoord's first team set-up.

After some serious mistakes during the 2005–06 season, including a direct pass to opposing FC Twente striker Blaise Nkufo, Aerts benched by head coach Erwin Koeman and in July 2006 he was demoted to the club's reserve team. After being transfer listed by Feyenoord and having trialled at Vitesse and English club West Bromwich Albion, Aerts eventually decided to sign a two-year contract with Willem II on 18 June 2007; a club he had been loaned out to the six months before. He had made his first appearance on loan for Willem II on 3 February 2007, an Eredivisie match against Heracles Almelo.

On 3 June 2010, at age 36, Aerts left the Netherlands and signed a two-year contract with German 2. Bundesliga club Hertha BSC. After two seasons he was released. He made 24 league appearances for the Berlin-based club and was a part of the team reaching promotion to the Bundesliga in the 2010–11 season. He retired after leaving Hertha BSC.

== Coaching career ==
On 6 July 2017, he was hired as a goalkeeper coach at FC Eindhoven. He left the position in 2021.

== Personal life ==
Aerts is the nephew of three time K-1 World Grand Prix Champion Peter Aerts.
