= Alexander Östlund =

Swedish former professional footballer (born 1978)

Personal information
- Date of birth: 2 November 1978 (age 47)
- Place of birth: Åkersberga, Sweden
- Height: 1.80 m (5 ft 11 in)
- Position: Right-back

Youth career
- IFK Österåker

Senior career*
Years	Team	Apps	(Gls)
1995–1998	AIK	46	(3)
1997	→ Brommapojkarna (loan)	13	(2)
1998–1999	Vitória de Guimarães	0	(0)
1999–2002	IFK Norrköping	76	(3)
2003–2004	Hammarby IF	45	(0)
2004–2006	Feyenoord	33	(0)
2006–2008	Southampton	44	(0)
2008–2010	Esbjerg fB	6	(0)
Total		262	(8)

International career
1994–1995	Sweden U17	19	(10)
1995–1996	Sweden U19	10	(3)
1998–1999	Sweden U21	5	(0)
2003–2006	Sweden	22	(0)
- * Club domestic league appearances and goals

Jan Alexander Östlund (born 2 November 1978), known as Alexander Mezan after his career, is a Swedish former professional footballer who played as a right-back. He began his professional career with AIK in 1995, and went on to play professionally in Portugal, the Netherlands, England, and Denmark before retiring in 2010. He won 22 caps for the Sweden national team between 2003 and 2006 and represented his country at UEFA Euro 2004.

== Club career ==
=== Early career ===
Alexander Östlund started his career in the club IFK Österåker in his hometown Åkersberga. At the age of 16 he was drafted for AIK Fotboll, where he played as a striker. He scored the club's last goal of the 1998 season, which meant AIK won Allsvenskan, the Swedish championship. He had a loan period at Birmingham City but was not offered a contract, and in January 1999 had a trial at English club Sheffield Wednesday who were then in the Premier League, however this did not lead to a transfer. He briefly represented Vitória de Guimarães in Portugal but did not receive any playing time. He was subsequently transferred to IFK Norrköping and converted into a defender.

=== Hammarby IF ===
Östlund played for Hammarby IF, having previously played as an attacker for AIK. In his first appearance for Hammarby during the "Nackas minne" (Lennart "Nacka" Skoglund Memorial) tournament in 2003, Östlund tackled AIK player Krister Nordin in the first minute of the match.

Mezan returned to Hammarby after his career as a member of the board for Hammarby Football.

=== Feyenoord ===
In July 2004, Östlund signed with Eredivisie's Feyenoord Rotterdam, playing his first match against Vitesse Arnhem.

=== Southampton ===
In Southampton, Östlund emerged as a cult hero for his hard tackles and marauding runs and was nicknamed "Jesus" due to his flowing locks and beard. On the final day of the 2005–06 Championship season, replica number 2 shirts flew out of the club shop, as Saints fans could be heard in matches chanting "Jesus is our right-back".

For the early part of the 2006–07 season he was in and out of the side but towards the end cemented his right-back position. He was always fully committed to the team and provided a useful option which allowed Chris Baird to move into the centre of the defence.

He started 2007–08 well, having to compete for the No. 2 position with on-loan players Phil Ifil and Christian Dailly, who both departed from the team in January 2008.

On 2 July 2008, he was released by the Saints as a free agent.

=== Esbjerg fB ===
On 25 August 2008, Östlund was presented as a new player in Danish club Esbjerg fB. His time in Esbjerg was blighted by injuries. On 25 January 2010, he was released from the club and he announced his retirement.

== International career ==
Östlund made his debut for the Sweden national team in a friendly game against Egypt in November 2003.

He played for Sweden at the 2004 European Championship after being called up as an injury replacement for Michael Svensson. Despite being a regular fixture during the 2006 World Cup qualification stage, he was controversially overlooked for the 2006 World Cup squad and was never called up for the national team again.

== Personal life ==
After his professional footballing career, he changed his last name from Östlund to Mezan. His daughter Nelly Mezan (born in December 2002) is a promising tennis player.

== Career statistics ==
=== International ===
Appearances and goals by national team and year
National team	Year	Apps	Goals
Sweden	2003	1	0
Sweden	2004	11	0
Sweden	2005	9	0
Sweden	2006	1	0
Total		22	0

== Honours ==
AIK

- Allsvenskan: 1998
