= Nicky Hofs =

Dutch footballer

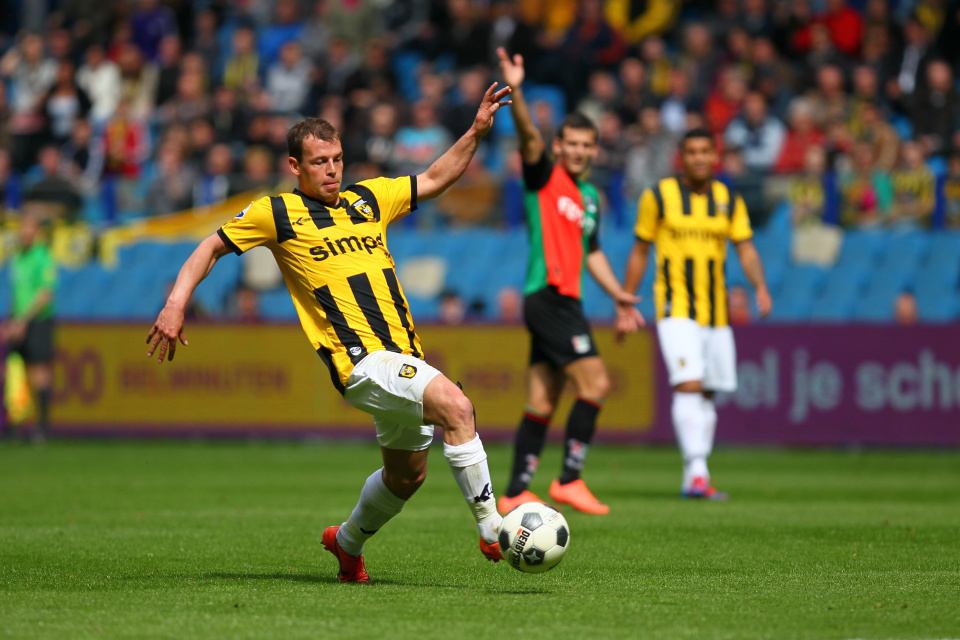
- Hofs in 2012

Personal information
- Date of birth: 17 May 1983 (age 43)
- Place of birth: Arnhem, Netherlands
- Height: 1.70 m (5 ft 7 in)
- Position: Midfielder

Youth career
- 1988–1994: Arnhemse Boys
- 1994–1995: Vitesse 1892
- 1995–2001: Vitesse

Senior career*
Years	Team	Apps	(Gls)
2001–2004	Vitesse	69	(15)
2004–2009	Feyenoord	68	(21)
2008–2009	→ Vitesse (loan)	30	(7)
2009–2010	Vitesse	31	(1)
2010–2011	AEL Limassol	14	(0)
2011–2013	Vitesse	33	(5)
2013	→ Willem II (loan)	9	(0)
2013	MASV		
Total		254	(49)

International career
2002–2006	Netherlands U21	15	(5)
2006	Netherlands	1	(0)

Managerial career
- 2013–2017: Vitesse (youth)
- 2017–2020: Vitesse (assistant)
- 2020–2024: Vitesse (youth)
- 2025–: Royal Antwerp (assistant)
Medal record
Men's football
Representing Netherlands
UEFA European Under-21 Championship
Winner	2006 Portugal
- * Club domestic league appearances and goals

Nicky Hofs (born 17 May 1983) is a Dutch former professional footballer who played as a midfielder. He spent most of his professional career with Vitesse. After retiring, he began working as a youth and assistant coach within the Vitesse organisation.

== Club career ==
=== Vitesse ===
Hofs started playing football at the age of five, for his team Arnhemse Boys in the city of Arnhem. It was soon discovered he possessed considerable talent. When he was twelve years old, scouts from both Ajax and Vitesse showed interest. After failing his trial at Ajax, Vitesse, his favourite Dutch team, decided to sign him. He first appeared in professional football in the 2001–02 season, playing 13 games for Vitesse and scoring two goals. Halfway through the 2004–05 season he was signed by Feyenoord. Hofs left Vitesse having played 69 official league games for the club and scored fifteen goals.

=== Feyenoord ===
In his first season for Feyenoord he played 13 league games. In his second season Hofs started off strong, scoring four goals in six matches. However, he suffered a major knee injury, which limited his number of appearances during the 2005–06 season. He left Feyenoord on loan to his former team Vitesse on 1 September 2008, including the option for a permanent transfer.

=== Return to Vitesse ===
After one season on loan, in which Hofs made 30 appearances and seven goals, he signed a two-year contract with Vitesse, as he had been transfer listed by Feyenoord. He stayed one more season, playing 31 games and scoring once. Despite an ongoing contract, he left Vitesse in the summer of 2010 due to the club's financial issues which meant that they were unable to pay Hofs' relatively high salary.

=== AEL Limassol ===
Hofs signed a two-year contract with Cypriot club AEL Limassol in June 2010. After one season, playing 14 matches without scoring any goals, he could leave the club on a free transfer. In June 2011, he stated that he had not received his salary for four months, and that he would file a lawsuit with FIFA. This case ended in February 2014, where Hofs alongside fellow former teammate Mike Zonneveld reached a settlement with the club for a "considerable sum", after having taken the case to the Court of Arbitration for Sport (CAS).

=== Third spell with Vitesse ===
On 3 August 2011, Hofs returned to Vitesse for the third and final time. Although he played 27 matches in his first season, he left on loan to Willem II in January 2013, after only playing six matches in the first half of the season. In June 2013, Hofs announced his retirement from professional football at only 30 years old, as he was physically unable to play at a high level any more.

== International career ==
Hofs has won one cap for the Dutch national team. He was not selected for the Dutch national team for the 2006 FIFA World Cup in Germany, but joined the Netherlands U21 for the 2006 UEFA European Under-21 Championship in Portugal. With two goals in the semi-finals and one in the final, he played a vital role in winning the European title. Hofs finished second on the tournaments topscorers list, one goal behind Dutch striker Klaas-Jan Huntelaar. He played 15 games for the Jong Oranje.

== Coaching career ==
After his playing career, Hofs started as a youth coach at Vitesse. He also made a comeback as a football player for the amateur club MASV, where he simultaneously served as an assistant coach. During the 2018-19 season, he briefly took on the role of caretaker manager for a few weeks. In 2017, he was added to Vitesse's technical staff. Hofs was an assistant coach for the first team for three years under head coaches Henk Fraser, Edward Sturing and Leonid Slutsky. From the 2020–21 season, he became head coach of Vitesse U21, formerly Jong Vitesse, where he took over from Joseph Oosting. In September 2020, eight staff members tested positive for SARS-CoV-2 during the COVID-19 pandemic, including new head coach of the first team, Thomas Letsch. The outbreak caused a minor reorganisation within Vitesse, with Sturing temporarily taking over the reins as head coach, assisted by Johannes Spors and Hofs.

In November 2025, he agreed to join Joseph Oosting's coaching staff at Belgian side Royal Antwerp.

== Honours ==
Feyenoord

- KNVB Cup: 2007–08
