= Ali Boussaboun =

Dutch-Moroccan football player

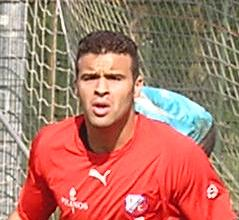
- Boussaboun in 2007

Personal information
- Date of birth: 11 June 1979 (age 47)
- Place of birth: Tangier, Morocco
- Height: 1.78 m (5 ft 10 in)
- Position: Striker

Youth career
- 199x–1996: RKAVV Laakkwartier

Senior career*
Years	Team	Apps	(Gls)
1996–2001	ADO Den Haag	127	(32)
2001–2002	Groningen	24	(4)
2002–2005	NAC Breda	86	(23)
2005–2007	Feyenoord	36	(6)
2007	→ Utrecht (loan)	9	(0)
2007–2008	Al Wakra	22	(18)
2008–2009	Utrecht	22	(5)
2009–2010	Al-Nasr	24	(13)
2010–2011	NAC Breda	23	(4)
2011–2012	ADO Den Haag	21	(1)
2012–2013	Quick Den Haag		
2014–2015	Haaglandia	3	(1)

International career
2005–2006	Morocco	13	(0)
- * Club domestic league appearances and goals

Ali Boussaboun (Arabic: علي بوصابون; born 11 June 1979) is a Dutch-Moroccan former professional footballer who played as a striker. After retiring as a player, Boussaboun worked as a scout for the Moroccan football federation.

== Career ==
Boussaboun was born in Tangier, Morocco. He has played for ADO Den Haag, FC Groningen, NAC Breda, Feyenoord, Al-Wakrah Sports Club, FC Utrecht and Al-Nasr Sports Club. He joined the Dubai-based club in July 2009, after his contract with FC Utrecht expired. He returned to the Netherlands after one year, signing a contract with NAC Breda in the Eredivisie. He has been capped 12 times for the Morocco national team.
