= 2002–03 Feyenoord season =

Feyenoord
2002–03 season
- Chairman: Jorien van den Herik
- Manager: Bert van Marwijk
- Stadium: De Kuip
- Eredivisie: 3rd
- KNVB Cup: Runner-up
- UEFA Champions League: Group stage
- UEFA Super Cup: Runner-up
- Top goalscorer: League: Pierre van Hooijdonk (28); All: Pierre van Hooijdonk (30)
Home colours	Away colours

The 2002–03 season was Feyenoord at 47th consecutive season playing in the Eredivisie, the top division of Dutch football. Feyenoord finished 3rd in the 2002–03 Eredivisie and qualified for the UEFA Champions League. In the KNVB Cup, they lost the final to FC Utrecht. In the 2002–03 UEFA Champions League, Feyenoord was eliminated after the group stage.

== Competitions ==
=== Eredivisie ===
==== League table ====
Pos	Team	Pld	W	D	L	GF	GA	GD	Pts	Qualification or relegation
1	PSV (C)	34	26	6	2	87	20	+67	84	Qualification to Champions League group stage
2	Ajax	34	26	5	3	96	32	+64	83	Qualification to Champions League third qualifying round
3	Feyenoord	34	25	5	4	89	39	+50	80	Qualification to UEFA Cup first round
4	NAC Breda	34	13	13	8	42	31	+11	52	Qualification to UEFA Cup first round
5	NEC	34	14	9	11	41	40	+1	51	Qualification to UEFA Cup first round

Rules for classification: 1) Points; 2) Goal difference; 3) Goals scored; 4) Head-to-head points; 5) Head-to-head goal difference; 6) Head-to-head away goals scored; 7) Play-off if relevant for deciding champion, relegation or participating in a European league, otherwise by draw. 8) Penalty shoot-out (only after a play-off)
(C) Champions

==== Results summary ====
Overall								Home						Away					
Pld	W	D	L	GF	GA	GD	Pts	W	D	L	GF	GA	GD	W	D	L	GF	GA	GD
34	25	5	4	89	39	+50	80	16	0	1	50	14	+36	9	5	3	39	25	+14

Source: Matches

==== Results by matchday ====
Matchday	1	2	3	4	5	6	7	8	9	10	11	12	13	14	15	16	17	18	19	20	21	22	23	24	25	26	27	28	29	30	31	32	33	34
Ground	H	A	H	A	H	A	H	A	H	A	H	A	A	H	A	H	A	H	A	A	H	H	A	A	H	A	H	A	H	A	H	H	A	H
Result	W	D	W	W	W	L	L	D	W	W	W	W	L	W	L	W	D	W	D	W	W	W	W	W	W	W	W	W	W	W	W	W	D	W
Position	3	4	4	3	3	3	3	4	3	3	3	3	3	3	3	3	3	3	3	3	3	3	3	3	3	3	3	3	3	3	3	3	3	3

Source: Voetbal.com
A = Away; H = Home; W = Win; D = Draw; L = Loss

==== Matches ====
18 August 2002 1	Feyenoord	2–0	NEC	Rotterdam
14:30 CET	Bosvelt (yellow card) 69'; Kalou 77'; Emerton 81'	Report	(yellow card) 1' Zonneveld	Stadium: Feijenoord Stadion; Attendance: 40,000; Referee: Ben Haverkort

24 August 2002 2	Roda JC	2–2	Feyenoord	Kerkrade
19:30 CET	Soetaers 37', 87'	Report	13' Paauwe; 82' Van Hooijdonk	Stadium: Parkstad Limburg Stadion; Attendance: 14,000; Referee: Ruud Bossen

1 September 2002 3	Feyenoord	4–1	Excelsior	Rotterdam
20:00 CET	Van Hooijdonk 12' (pen.), 14'; Pardo 53'; Bombarda 90'	Report	25' Pinas	Stadium: Feijenoord Stadion; Attendance: 43,100; Referee: Roelof Luinge

14 September 2002 4	FC Twente	1–5	Feyenoord	Enschede
20:00 CET	Booth 25'	Report	24', 45' Ono; 40', 76' Buffel; 67' Van Hooijdonk	Stadium: Arke Stadion; Attendance: 13,250; Referee: Jack van Hulten

21 September 2002 5	Feyenoord	2–0	De Graafschap	Rotterdam
20:00 CET	Van Hooijdonk 6'; Buffel 56'	Report	(yellow card) 84' Smit	Stadium: Feijenoord Stadion; Attendance: 43,500; Referee: Herman van Dijk

28 September 2002 6	RBC	4–2	Feyenoord	Roosendaal
19:30 CET	Nascimento 45'; Den Ouden 54'; Vos 60'; Oliseh (yellow card) 74'; Daelemans 90'	Report	29' Buffel; 75' Van Hooijdonk	Stadium: Vast & Goed Stadion; Attendance: 5,000; Referee: Dick Jol

6 October 2002 7	Feyenoord	1–2	Ajax	Rotterdam
13:00 CET	Van Hooijdonk 56'; Van Persie (yellow card) 90'	Report	23' Wamberto; 43' Litmanen; (yellow card) 72' Van Damme; (yellow card) 82' Witschge	Stadium: Feijenoord Stadion; Attendance: 42,200; Referee: Roelof Luinge

19 October 2002 8	Vitesse	1–1	Feyenoord	Arnhem
19:30 CET	Amoah 30'	Report	57' Buffel	Stadium: Gelredome; Attendance: 26,000; Referee: Ruud Bossen

26 October 2002 9	Feyenoord	5–1	Willem II	Rotterdam
20:00 CET	Bosvelt 16'; Kalou 44'; Lurling 48', 66'; Song 51'	Report	(yellow card) 36' Sektioui; 40' Van der Gun; (red card) 53' Ceesay	Stadium: Feijenoord Stadion; Attendance: 44,000; Referee: Dick van Egmond

3 November 2002 10	FC Groningen	0–2	Feyenoord	Groningen
14:30 CET		Report	50' Buffel; 63' Ono	Stadium: Oosterpark Stadion; Attendance: 12,800; Referee: Eric Braamhaar

10 November 2002 11	Feyenoord	2–0	FC Zwolle	Rotterdam
14:30 CET	Ono 65' (pen.); Bombarda 67'	Report		Stadium: Feijenoord Stadion; Attendance: 44,000; Referee: Fred Sterk

17 November 2002 12	PSV	1–2	Feyenoord	Eindhoven
13:00 CET	Rommedahl 54'	Report	28' Ono; 43' Buffel; (yellow card) 52' Song; (yellow card) 61' Kalou; (yellow card) 63' Paauwe	Stadium: Philips Stadion; Attendance: 35,200; Referee: René Temmink

23 November 2002 13	RKC	1–0	Feyenoord	Waalwijk
20:00 CET	Van den Berg (yellow card) 42' Oost 82'	Report		Stadium: Mandemakers Stadion; Attendance: 8,200; Referee: Dick Jol

1 December 2002 14	Feyenoord	2–1	FC Utrecht	Rotterdam
14:30 CET	Emerton 31'; Lurling (yellow card) 65'; Van Persie (yellow card) 89'; Bosvelt 90'	Report	78' (yellow card) 89' Tanghe	Stadium: Feijenoord Stadion; Attendance: 44,000; Referee: Roelof Luinge

7 December 2002 15	SC Heerenveen	3–1	Feyenoord	Heerenveen
19:30 CET	De Jong (yellow card) 34'; Väyrynen 63'; Denneboom 69'; Nurmela (yellow card) 74' (goal) 88'	Report	57' Buffel	Stadium: Abe Lenstra Stadion; Attendance: 14,400; Referee: Ruud Bossen

15 December 2002 16	Feyenoord	6–1	AZ	Rotterdam
14:30 CET	Ono 2', 85'; Van Hooijdonk 17', 62'; Pardo 27'; Van Wonderen (yellow card) 58'; Bombarda 89'	Report	(yellow card) 5' Lindenbergh; (yellow card) 61' Wolters; 69' Perez	Stadium: Feijenoord Stadion; Attendance: 42,000; Referee: Ben Haverkort

22 December 2002 17	NAC	1–1	Feyenoord	Breda
14:30 CET	Penders (yellow card) 54'; Fehér 86'	Report	6' Pardo; (yellow card) 57' Van Wonderen; (yellow card) 89' Bosvelt	Stadium: Rat Verlegh Stadion; Attendance: 15,340; Referee: Ruud Bossen

26 January 2003 18	Feyenoord	4–2	FC Twente	Rotterdam
14:30 CET	Kalou 10', 66'; Buffel 70'; Van Persie 88'	Report	(yellow card) 33' (goal) 40' Cavens; 72' (yellow card) 75' Cziommer; (yellow card) 73' Heubach	Stadium: Feijenoord Stadion; Attendance: 42,000; Referee: Dick van Egmond

9 February 2003 19	Ajax	1–1	Feyenoord	Amsterdam
13:00 CET	Ibrahimović 28'; De Jong (yellow card) 40'	Report	(yellow card) 37' Buffel; 45' Van Persie	Stadium: Amsterdam ArenA; Attendance: 50,777; Referee: Dick Jol

16 February 2003 20	AZ	1–4	Feyenoord	Alkmaar
20:00 CET	Fortes Rodriguez (yellow card) 63'; Kromkamp 85'	Report	12' Van Persie; 15', 32' Van Hooijdonk; 18' Kalou	Stadium: Alkmaarderhout; Attendance: 8,072; Referee: Ben Haverkort

23 February 2003 21	Feyenoord	4–1	FC Groningen	Rotterdam
14:30 CET	Van Hooijdonk 32', 35'; Emerton 39'; Buffel 55'	Report	(yellow card) 24' Schoenmakers; (yellow card) 79' Boekweg; 83' Van Gessel	Stadium: Feijenoord Stadion; Attendance: 44,000; Referee: Hugo Luijten

2 March 2003 22	Feyenoord	2–1	NAC	Rotterdam
14:30 CET	Buffel 14'; Van Wonderen (yellow card) 47'; Van Hooijdonk 86'	Report	5' Boussaboun; (yellow card) 26' Slot; (yellow card) 87' Van Den Eede; (yellow card) 90' Abdellaoui	Stadium: Feijenoord Stadion; Attendance: 40,100; Referee: René Temmink

8 March 2003 23	Excelsior	2–6	Feyenoord	Rotterdam
19:30 CET	Swerts 31'; Holman 86'	Report	13' Van Persie; 26', 88' Buffel; 35', 90' (pen.) Van Hooijdonk; 50' Kalou	Stadium: Stadion Woudestein; Attendance: 3,768; Referee: Jack van Hulten

16 March 2003 24	NEC	1–2	Feyenoord	Nijmegen
14:30 CET	Wielaert (yellow card) 4' (goal) 11' (pen.); Tumba (yellow card) 45'	Report	38', 87' (yellow card) 49' Van Hooijdonk; (yellow card) 39' Bosvelt	Stadium: De Goffert; Attendance: 12,250; Referee: Dick van Egmond

22 March 2003 25	Feyenoord	5–0	SC Heerenveen	Rotterdam
19:30 CET	Buffel 10'; Van Persie 49'; Van Hooijdonk 58', 62', 69' (pen.); De Nooijer (yellow card) 81'	Report	(yellow card) 34' Hansma; (yellow card) 66' Venema; (yellow card) 90' Sibon	Stadium: Feijenoord Stadion; Attendance: 46,200; Referee: Dick Jol

5 April 2003 26	De Graafschap	3–4	Feyenoord	Doetinchem
19:30 CET	Van der Kruis (yellow card) 20'; Van Leerdam 52'; Van Gastel 60'; Van de Haar 64'; Berck Beelenkamp (yellow card) 83'	Report	24' Van Persie; 40' (yellow card) 55' (yellow-red card) Buffel; (red card) 59' De Nooijer; 77' Kalou; 83' (pen.) Van Hooijdonk; (yellow card) 83' Van Wonderen	Stadium: De Vijverberg; Attendance: 11,000; Referee: Ruud Bossen

12 April 2003 27	Feyenoord	2–1	Vitesse	Rotterdam
19:30 CET	Van Persie 19'; Lurling 90' (yellow card) 90'	Report	23' Peters	Stadium: Feijenoord Stadion; Attendance: 43,000; Referee: Ben Haverkort

20 April 2003 28	FC Zwolle	1–3	Feyenoord	Zwolle
14:30 CET	Bosschaart 49'	Report	6' Buffel; 14', 90' (pen.) Van Hooijdonk; (yellow card) 67' Van Persie; (yellow card) 87' Bosvelt	Stadium: Oosterenkstadion; Attendance: 6,500; Referee: René Temmink

24 April 2003 29	Feyenoord	1–0	RBC	Rotterdam
14:30 CET	Van Wonderen (yellow card) 57'; De Nooijer (yellow card) 66'; Paauwe 90'	Report	(yellow card) 57' Sillah; (yellow card) 64' De Graaf	Stadium: Feijenoord Stadion; Attendance: 43,000; Referee: Dick Jol

4 May 2003 30	FC Utrecht	1–2	Feyenoord	Utrecht
13:00 CET	Gluščević 12'; Vreven (yellow card) 15'	Report	3' (red card) 23' Van Persie; (yellow card) 37' Lodewijks; 71' (yellow card) 90' Buffel	Stadium: Stadion Galgenwaard; Attendance: 18,925; Referee: Dick van Egmond

11 May 2003 31	Feyenoord	2–1	RKC	Rotterdam
14:30 CET	Kalou 39'; Paauwe (yellow card) 54'; Van Hooijdonk 77'	Report	6' Van Diemen; (yellow card) 22' Teixeira; (yellow card) 28' Nikiforov; (yellow card) 70' De Graef; (yellow card) 84' Boulahrouz	Stadium: Feijenoord Stadion; Attendance: 43,500; Referee: René Temmink

18 May 2003 32	Feyenoord	3–1	PSV	Rotterdam
13:00 CET	Van Hooijdonk 34' (pen.), 45', 66' (pen.); De Nooijer (yellow card) 37'; Lurling (yellow card) 49'; Paauwe (yellow card) 55'	Report	(yellow card) 32' Ooijer; (yellow card) 49' Lee; (yellow card) 49' Bruggink; 53' Kežman; (yellow card) 65' Van der Schaaf	Stadium: Stadion Feijenoord; Attendance: 45,000; Referee: Dick Jol

25 May 2003 33	Willem II	1–1	Feyenoord	Tilburg
14:30 CET	Quinn 7'; Meriana (yellow card) 69'	Report	74' Kalou	Stadium: Koning Willem II Stadion; Attendance: 14,600; Referee: Ben Haverkort

29 May 2003 34	Feyenoord	3–1	Roda JC	Rotterdam
14:30 CET	Kalou 26'; Filipović 38' (own goal); Loovens (yellow card) 64'; Buffel 75'	Report	50' Cristiano; (yellow card) 87' Addo	Stadium: Stadion Feijenoord; Attendance: 43,500; Referee: Eric Braamhaar

=== KNVB Cup ===
5 February 2003 1/8 Final	Feyenoord	6–1	AGOVV Apeldoorn	Rotterdam
20:00 CET	Lurling 42'; Van Persie 45', 47', 54', 61', 64'; Loovens (yellow card)		Juliana 88'	Stadium: Feijenoord Stadion; Attendance: 12,184; Referee: Peter van Dongen

5 March 2003 1/4 Final	Feyenoord	3–1	Vitesse Arnhem	Rotterdam
20:45 CEST	Kalou 3'; Van Persie 60', 65'; Emerton (yellow card)		Peeters 26'; Claessens (yellow card); Stefanović (yellow card)	Stadium: Feijenoord Stadion; Attendance: 21,516; Referee: Roelof Luinge

16 April 2003 1/2 Final	Feyenoord	1–0	Ajax	Rotterdam
20:45 CEST	Bosvelt 53' (yellow card) 75'; Van Hooijdonk (red card) 86'			Stadium: Feijenoord Stadion; Attendance: 43,000; Referee: Roelof Luinge

1 June 2003 Final	FC Utrecht	4–1	Feyenoord	Rotterdam
18:00 CEST	De Jong 39' (yellow card); Gluscevic 49', 57'; Kuyt 81'		Kalou 72'; Bosvelt (red card) 76'; Emerton (yellow card); Van Hooijdonk (yellow card)	Stadium: Stadion Galgenwaard; Attendance: 45,000; Referee: Ruud Bossen

=== UEFA Super Cup ===
30 August 2002 Final	Real Madrid (Spain)	3–1	(Netherlands) Feyenoord	Monaco
20:45 CET	Paauwe 15' (o.g.); Roberto Carlos 21'; Guti 60'	report	Van Hooijdonk 56'; Lurling (yellow card)	Stadium: Stade Louis II; Attendance: 18,284; Referee: Hugh Dallas (Scotland)

=== UEFA Champions League ===
13 August 2002 3rd qualifying round	Feyenoord	1–0	(Turkey) Fenerbahçe	Rotterdam
20:30 CET	Ono (yellow card) 30' (goal) 64'; Emerton (yellow card) 43'	Report	(yellow card) 13' Doğan; (yellow card) 26' Temizkanoglu; (yellow card) 35' Rapaić	Stadium: Stadion Feijenoord; Attendance: 25,500; Referee: Stéphane Bré (France)

27 August 2002 3rd qualifying round	Fenerbahçe (Turkey)	0–2	Feyenoord	Istanbul
20:00 CET	Mirković (yellow card) 21'; Ortega (yellow card) 57'	Report	(yellow card) 40' Bosvelt; 48' Ono; (yellow card) 70' Kalou; (yellow card) 82' Rząsa; 88' Buffel	Stadium: Şükrü Saracoğlu Stadium; Attendance: 43,000; Referee: Markus Merk (Germany)

18 September 2002 Group Stage Match 1	Feyenoord	1–1	(Italy) Juventus	Rotterdam
20:45 CET	Emerton (yellow card) 18'; Van Hooijdonk 75'; Kalou (yellow card) 85'	Report	(yellow card) 10' Ferrara; 32' Camoranesi; (yellow card) 73' Fresi; (yellow card) 74' Nedvěd	Stadium: Stadion Feijenoord; Attendance: 40,000; Referee: Antonio López Nieto (Spain)

24 September 2002 Group Stage Match 2	Newcastle United (England)	0–1	Feyenoord	Newcastle
20:45 CET		Report	4' Pardo; (yellow card) 43' Bosvelt; (yellow card) 75' Ono; (yellow card) 88' Van Wonderen	Stadium: St. James' Park; Attendance: 40,540; Referee: Claude Colombo (France)

1 October 2002 Group Stage Match 3	Feyenoord	0–0	(Ukraine) Dynamo Kyiv	Rotterdam
20:45 CET	Van Hooijdonk (yellow card) 28'	Report	(yellow card) 29' Gavrančić	Stadium: Stadion Feijenoord; Attendance: 48,000; Referee: Tom Henning Øvrebø (Norway)

23 October 2002 Group Stage Match 4	Dynamo Kyiv (Ukraine)	2–0	Feyenoord	Kyiv
20:45 CET	Khatskevich 16'; Belkevich 47'	Report	(yellow card) 36' Van Wonderen; (yellow card) 50' Kalou; (yellow card) 73' Lurling	Stadium: Olimpiyskiy National Sports Complex; Attendance: 73,000; Referee: Markus Merk (Germany)

29 October 2002 Group Stage Match 5	Juventus (Italy)	2–0	Feyenoord	Turin
20:45 CET	Di Vaio 4', 69'; Tacchinardi (yellow card) 26'	Report	(yellow card) 21' Ono; (yellow card) 24' Rząsa; (yellow card) 33' Paauwe; (yellow card) 52' Bombarda	Stadium: Stadio Delle Alpi; Attendance: 35,789; Referee: Gilles Veissière (France)

6 November 2002 Group Stage Match 6	Feyenoord	2–3	(England) Newcastle United	Rotterdam
20:45 CET	Paauwe (yellow card) 58'; Bombarda 65' (yellow card) 79'; Lurling 71'	Report	45', 90' (yellow card) 87' Bellamy; 49' Viana; (yellow card) 69' Griffin	Stadium: Stadion Feijenoord; Attendance: 45,000; Referee: Franz-Xaver Wack (Germany)

=== Friendlies ===
12 July 2002	Lekkerkerk	0–11	Feyenoord	Lekkerkerk
			14' Lurling; 17' Elmander; 26', 32' Bosvelt; 44' Leonardo II; 45', 54', 68', 84' Buffel; 58', 78' Pinas

17 July 2002 Alps Cup	Feyenoord	0–0	(Germany) Hamburger SV	Tirol

18 July 2002 Alps Cup	Feyenoord	0–1	(Germany) 1. FC Kaiserslautern	Tirol
	Lurling (red card) 89'		16' Malz

21 July 2002	Feyenoord	8–0	(Austria) SV Raika Axams	Tirol
	Ono 4', 55' (pen.); Loovens 18'; Kalou 58' (pen.); Emerton 70'; Pinas 80'; Buffel 82', 90'

24 July 2002	Spijkenisse	1–7	Feyenoord	Spijkenisse
	Broeder 21'		30' Lurling; 42', 73', 86' Bosvelt; 62', 88' Ono; 65' Pinas	Stadium: Sportpark Jaap Riedijk

27 July 2002	Excelsior	3–4	Feyenoord	Rotterdam
	Boutahar 46', 82'; Lopes 73'		10' Emerton; 29', 88' Kalou; 69' Buffel	Stadium: Stadion Woudestein

30 July 2002	BVV Barendrecht	0–6	Feyenoord	Barendrecht
			35', 39' Lurling; 46' Bosvelt; 75', 80' (pen.) Van Hooijdonk; 87' Rząsa	Stadium: Sportpark de Bongerd

4 August 2002	Feyenoord	2–2	(England) Tottenham Hotspur	Rotterdam
	Van Haaren 36'; Kalou 72'		23' Sheringham; 86' Iversen	Stadium: Stadion Feijenoord

== Player details ==
No.	Pos	Nat	Player	Total		Eredivisie		KNVB Cup		Champions League	
No.	Pos	Nat	Player	Apps	Goals	Apps	Goals	Apps	Goals	Apps	Goals
Goalkeepers
1	GK	(Netherlands) NED	Edwin Zoetebier	16	0	9	0	0	0	7	0
20	GK	(Netherlands) NED	Patrick Lodewijks	28	0	22	0	4	0	2	0
31	GK	(Netherlands) NED	Carlo l'Ami	3	0	3	0	0	0	0	0
34	GK	(Netherlands) NED	Jesper Hogedoorn	1	0	1	0	0	0	0	0
Defenders
2	DF	(Ghana) GHA	Christian Gyan	18	0	12	0	2	0	4	0
3	DF	(Poland) POL	Tomasz Rząsa	21	0	13	0	1	0	7	0
4	DF	(Belgium) BEL	Pieter Collen	0	0	0	0	0	0	0	0
5	DF	(Netherlands) NED	Ramon van Haaren	9	0	6	0	0	0	3	0
8	DF	(Netherlands) NED	Kees van Wonderen	39	0	29	0	3	0	7	0
17	DF	(Netherlands) NED	Patrick Paauwe	44	2	32	2	4	0	8	0
20	MF	(Netherlands) NED	Ferry de Haan	3	0	2	0	0	0	1	0
23	DF	(Australia) AUS	Brett Emerton	44	3	33	3	3	0	8	0
24	DF	(South Korea) KOR	Chong guk song	27	1	18	1	3	0	6	0
24	DF	(Brazil) BRA	Leonardo II	1	0	1	0	0	0	0	0
26	DF	(Netherlands) NED	Gerard de Nooijer	18	0	15	0	3	0	0	0
27	DF	(Netherlands) NED	Glenn Loovens	16	0	12	0	3	0	1	0
28	DF	(Netherlands) NED	Civard Sprockel	0	0	0	0	0	0	0	0
Midfielders
6	MF	(Netherlands) NED	Paul Bosvelt	41	3	31	2	4	1	6	0
14	MF	(Japan) JPN	Shinji Ono	38	9	29	7	2	0	7	2
19	MF	(Belgium) BEL	Thomas Buffel	41	19	31	18	3	0	7	1
20	MF	(Chile) CHI	Jorge Acuña	11	0	10	0	1	0	0	0
Forwards
7	FW	(Ivory Coast) CIV	Bonaventure Kalou	41	12	31	10	4	2	6	0
9	FW	(Netherlands) NED	Pierre van Hooijdonk	37	29	28	28	4	0	5	1
10	FW	(Netherlands) NED	Anthony Lurling	39	5	30	3	3	1	6	1
11	FW	(Brazil) BRA	Leonardo I	4	0	3	0	0	0	1	0
15	FW	(Argentina) ARG	Mariano Bombarda	22	4	16	3	2	0	4	1
15	FW	(Sweden) SWE	Johan Elmander	1	0	1	0	0	0	0	0
16	FW	(Poland) POL	Ebi Smolarek	0	0	0	0	0	0	0	0
22	FW	(Netherlands) NED	Robin van Persie	28	15	23	8	3	7	2	0
25	FW	(Chile) CHI	Sebastián Pardo	23	4	18	3	2	0	3	1

- Source: voetbal.com

== Transfers ==
In: Note: Flags indicate national team as defined under FIFA eligibility rules; some limited exceptions apply. Players may hold more than one non-FIFA nationality.

No.	Pos.	Nation	Player
10	FW	NED	Anthony Lurling ( (Netherlands) SC Heerenveen)
15	FW	ARG	Mariano Bombarda ( (Netherlands) Willem II)
20	MF	CHI	Jorge Acuña ( (Chile) Universidad Católica)
24	DF	KOR	Song Chong-gug ( (South Korea) Busan I'Cons)
25	FW	CHI	Sebastián Pardo ( Universidad de Chile)
26	DF	NED	Gerard de Nooijer ( (Netherlands) SC Heerenveen)
30	GK	NED	Patrick Lodewijks ( (Netherlands) PSV Eindhoven)
31	GK	NED	Carlo l'Ami ( (Netherlands) Excelsior)

Out: Note: Flags indicate national team as defined under FIFA eligibility rules; some limited exceptions apply. Players may hold more than one non-FIFA nationality.

No.	Pos.	Nation	Player
—	GK	POL	Jerzy Dudek ( (England) Liverpool F.C.)
—	FW	DEN	Jon Dahl Tomasson ( (Italy) AC Milan)
—	DF	NED	Ferry de Haan ( (Netherlands) Excelsior)
—	DF	NED	Said Boutahar ( (Netherlands) Excelsior)
—	FW	YUG	Radoslav Samardžić ( (Netherlands) SC Heerenveen)
—	MF	RUS	Igor Korneev ( (Netherlands) NAC Breda)
—	DF	NED	Jean-Paul van Gastel ( (Italy) Ternana Calcio)
—	DF	AUS	Stephen Laybutt ( (Australia) Sydney Olympic FC)
—	DF	BRA	Tininho ( (Brazil) America Mineiro)
—	DF	BRA	Leonardo II ( (Netherlands) De Graafschap)
—	GK	POL	Zbigniew Malkowski ( (Netherlands) Excelsior - On loan)
—	DF	NED	Civard Sprockel ( (Netherlands) Excelsior - On loan)
—	FW	SWE	Johan Elmander ( (Sweden) Djurgårdens IF - On loan)
—	DF	BEL	Pieter Collen ( (Netherlands) NAC Breda - On loan)
—	DF	CHI	Mauricio Aros ( (Israel) Maccabi Tel Aviv F.C. - On loan)
—	DF	NED	Ulrich van Gobbel (Retired)
—	MF	NED	Jan de Visser (Retired)

== Club ==
=== Coaching staff ===
Position	Staff
Manager	(Netherlands) Bert van Marwijk
Assistant manager	(Netherlands) John Metgod (Netherlands) Mario Been
Assistant manager / Goalkeeping coach	(Netherlands) Pim Doesburg

Last updated: 23 September 2017

=== Kit ===
Supplier: Kappa
Sponsor(s): Stad Rotterdam Verzekeringen

Home	Away	Goalkeeper

Last updated: 23 July 2013.
Source: Feyenoord
