= 2006–07 Feyenoord season =

Feyenoord
2006–07 season
- Chairman: Gerard Kerkum
- Manager: Erwin Koeman; Leo Beenhakker after 3 may
- Stadium: Stadion Feijenoord (De Kuip) (Capacity: 51.577)
- Eredivisie: 7th
- KNVB Cup: R32
- UEFA cup: R32
- Top goalscorer: League: 9 goals Angelos Charisteas; All: 10 goals Angelos Charisteas
- Highest home attendance: 46.000 (FC Groningen – Eredivisie)
- Lowest home attendance: 18.000 (FC Groningen – Play-offs UEFA cup)
- Average home league attendance: 40.382
- Biggest win: 4–1 (Sparta – Eredivisie)
- Biggest defeat: 1–5 (Heerenveen – Eredivisie)
Home colours	Away colours

The 2006–07 season was Feyenoord's 51st consecutive season playing in the Eredivisie, the top division of Dutch football. Feyenoord finished 7th in the 2006–07 Eredivisie and did not qualify for the 2007–08 UEFA Cup. In the 2006–07 KNVB Cup they lost in the 3rd round to RKC Waalwijk. But the absolute worst date in the season was 19 January 2007. On this date the UEFA decided to resign Feyenoord from the 2006–07 UEFA Cup after the supporters misbehaved in the game in and versus Nancy. The game versus Tottenham Hotspur F.C. did not continue. On 3 may head coach Erwin Koeman handed in his resignation due to motivational problems after a troublesome season.

== Competitions ==
=== Overall ===
Competition	Started round	Final position / round	First match	Last match
Eredivisie	—	7th	20 August 2006	29 April 2007
KNVB Cup	—	R32	21 September 2006	8 November 2006
UEFA Cup	—	DSQ	14 September 2006	13 December 2006

Source: Competitions

=== Eredivisie ===
==== League table ====
Pos	Team	Pld	W	D	L	GF	GA	GD	Pts	Qualification or relegation
5	Heerenveen	34	16	7	11	60	43	+17	55	Qualification to Champions League third qualifying round playoff
6	Roda JC	34	15	9	10	47	36	+11	54	Qualification to UEFA Cup first round playoff
7	Feyenoord	34	15	8	11	56	66	−10	53	Qualification to UEFA Cup first round playoff
8	Groningen	34	15	6	13	54	54	0	51	Qualification to UEFA Cup first round playoff
9	Utrecht	34	13	9	12	41	44	−3	48	Qualification to UEFA Cup first round playoff

Rules for classification: 1) points; 2) goal difference; 3) number of goals scored.

==== Results summary ====
Overall								Home						Away					
Pld	W	D	L	GF	GA	GD	Pts	W	D	L	GF	GA	GD	W	D	L	GF	GA	GD
34	15	8	11	56	66	−10	53	10	5	2	29	24	+5	5	3	9	27	42	−15

Source: Matches

==== Matches ====
20 August 2006 1	FC Groningen	3 – 0	Feyenoord	Groningen
14:30 CEST	Nevland 55'; van de Laak 61'; Salmon 68'; Lindgren (yellow card) 78'	Report		Stadium: Euroborg; Attendance: 19.814; Referee: Temmink

27 August 2006 2	Feyenoord	0 – 0	Heracles	Rotterdam
14:30 CEST	Bahia (yellow card) 4'; Tiendalli (yellow card) 40'; Greene (yellow card) 43'; Lucius (yellow card) 57'	Report	Tanghe (yellow card) 6'; Boakye (yellow card) 48'; Schilder (yellow card) 48'	Stadium: De Kuip; Attendance: 40.000; Referee: van Sichem

10 September 2006 3	Sparta	1 – 4	Feyenoord	Rotterdam
14:30 CEST	Anastasiou 17' (pen.) (yellow card) 84'; Schenkel (yellow card) 46'; Gudde (red card) 61'	Report	Hofs 10', 14'; Drenthe (yellow card) 23'; Charisteas (yellow card) 39'; Buijs (yellow card) 70'; Boussaboun (yellow card) 79' (goal) 88'; Lucius 85' (pen.)	Stadium: Het Kasteel; Attendance: 10.500; Referee: Haverkort

17 September 2006 4	PSV	2 – 1	Feyenoord	Eindhoven
12:30 CEST	Farfán 7' (yellow card) 57'; Alex (yellow card) 29' (goal) 42'	Report	Hofs (yellow card) 12'; de Guzmán 44'	Stadium: Philips Stadion; Attendance: 35.000; Referee: Vink

24 September 2006 5	Feyenoord	1 – 0	Excelsior	Rotterdam
14:30 CEST	de Guzmán 9'; Hofs (yellow card) 42'; Pardo (yellow card) 62'; Drenthe (yellow card) 65'	Report	Zijm (yellow card) 50'	Stadium: De Kuip; Attendance: 39.000; Referee: Blom

1 October 2006 6	Feyenoord	3 – 2	NAC	Rotterdam
14:30 CEST	Buijs 33'; Hofs 46'; Vincken (yellow card) 53'; van Hooijdonk 63'; Pardo (yellow card) 85'; Lucius (yellow card) 90'	Report	Rigters 13'; Stam (yellow card) 30'; Zonneveld 37'; Diba (yellow card) 88'	Stadium: De Kuip; Attendance: 38.000; Referee: Bossen

15 October 2006 7	RKC Waalwijk	2 – 2	Feyenoord	Waalwijk
14:30 CEST	van Diemen 21' (yellow card) 74'; Reuser 28' (yellow card) 47'; van Haaren (yellow card) 44'; Keller (yellow card) 57'	Report	Greene (yellow card) 33'; Boussaboun 38'; Lucius 45' (pen.); Buijs (yellow card) 47'; de Guzmán (yellow card) 53'; Hofs (yellow card) 76'	Stadium: Mandemakers Stadion; Attendance: 7.000; Referee: van Sichem

22 October 2006 8	Feyenoord	0 – 4	Ajax	Rotterdam
12:30 CEST	de Guzmán (yellow card) 51'; Tiendalli (yellow card) 56'; Hofs (yellow card) 58'; Drenthe (yellow card) 64'; van Hooijdonk (red card) 66'; Pardo (red card) 85'; Saidi (yellow card) 86'	Report	Huntelaar 12', 38'; Perez 50' (pen.), 62'; Emanuelson (yellow card) 53'; Gabri (yellow card) 74'	Stadium: De Kuip; Attendance: 41.000; Referee: Temmink

26 October 2006 9	Feyenoord	2 – 1	FC Twente	Rotterdam
20:00 CEST	Huysegems 47'; Hofs (yellow card) 64'; de Guzman 85' (yellow card) 85'	Report	Touma 30'; Jeroen Heubach (yellow card) 63'; Zomer (yellow card) 90'	Stadium: De Kuip; Attendance: 38.000; Referee: Jol

29 October 2006 10	Roda JC	1 – 2	Feyenoord	Kerkrade
12:30 CEST	Ramzi 20'; Cissé (yellow card) 54'	Report	Charisteas 39'; Huysegems 66'; Derijck (yellow card) 77'; Tiendalli (yellow card) 90'	Stadium: Parkstad Limburg; Attendance: 18.000; Referee: Haverkort

5 November 2006 11	Feyenoord	2 – 1	Vitesse	Rotterdam
14:30 CEST	Bahia 23'; Lucius 70'	Report	Lazović 59'; Janssen (yellow card) 66'; Fränkel (yellow card) 69'	Stadium: De Kuip; Attendance: 40.000; Referee: Braamhaar

12 November 2006 12	Willem II	3 – 5	Feyenoord	Tilburg
12:30 CEST	Bælum 56'; Redan 60'; Hadouir 78' (pen.); Nieuwendaal (yellow card) 87'	Report	Huysegems 10'; Buijs 33', 74' (yellow card) 69'; Kolkka 54', 61'; Tiendalli (red card) 76'	Stadium: Koning Willem II Stadion; Attendance: 12.750; Referee: van Hulten

18 November 2006 13	Feyenoord	3 – 2	AZ	Rotterdam
20:00 CEST	Hofs 29', 81'; Drenthe (yellow card) 33'; Derijck 56'	Report	de Zeeuw 32'; Koevermans 74' (yellow card) 83'; Steinsson (yellow card) 88'	Stadium: De Kuip; Attendance: 45.000; Referee: Ben Haverkort

26 November 2006 14	NEC	4 – 1	Feyenoord	Nijmegen
12:30 CEST	Niedzielan (yellow card) 26' (goal) 86'; Holman 54'; Eagles 80'; Kivuvu 83'	Report	Greene (yellow card) 5'; Pothuizen 90' (o.g.)	Stadium: De Goffert; Attendance: 12.000; Referee: Vink

3 December 2006 15	Feyenoord	4 – 3	Heerenveen	Rotterdam
14:30 CEST	Stein Huysegems 45', 51'; Lucius 65' (pen.); de Guzmán (yellow card) 67' (goal) 84'; Hofs (yellow card) 83'	Report	Alves 24'; Dingsdag (yellow card) 42'; Nilsson (yellow card) 44'; Friend 74', 79'; Breuer (yellow card) 85'	Stadium: De Kuip; Attendance: 38.000; Referee: Gumienny (Belgium)

10 December 2006 16	Feyenoord	3 – 1	ADO Den Haag	Rotterdam
12:30 CEST	Bahia (yellow card) 41'; Hofs 55'; de Guzmán 59'; Charisteas 85' (pen.)	Report	Bosschaart (yellow card) 38'; Kolk 90'	Stadium: De Kuip; Attendance: 36.000; Referee: Blom

17 December 2006 17	FC Utrecht	2 – 1	Feyenoord	Utrecht
12:30 CEST	van Dijk 9' (pen.); Nelisse 17'; Kruys (yellow card) 58'; Rossini (red card) 83'	Report	Greene (yellow card) 8'; Charisteas (yellow card) 59'; Drenthe (yellow card) 66'; Vlaar 89'; Buijs (yellow card) 90' (yellow-red card)	Stadium: Stadion Galgenwaard; Attendance: 21.750; Referee: Luinge

23 December 2006 18	Feyenoord	3 – 2	Sparta	Rotterdam
20:00 CEST	Charisteas 17'; Lucius 29' (pen.); Kolkka (yellow card) 60'; Vincken 75'	Report	Tsvetkov 16'; Moreno Freire 46'	Stadium: De Kuip; Attendance: 44.000; Referee: Braamhaar

26 December 2006 19	Feyenoord	1 – 1	PSV	Rotterdam
12:30 CEST	Charisteas 38'; Lucius (yellow card) 78'	Report	Cocu 16'; Afellay (yellow card) 68'	Stadium: De Kuip; Attendance: 40.000; Referee: Bossen

29 December 2006 20	Excelsior	1 – 3	Feyenoord	Rotterdam
20:15 CEST	Voskamp 80'	Report	Buijs 31'; Hofs 40'; Huysegems 50'	Stadium: Stadion Woudestein; Attendance: 3.527; Referee: Haverkort

21 January 2007 21	NAC	4 – 1	Feyenoord	Breda
12:30 CEST	van Gessel 12'; Zonneveld 21' (yellow card) 51'; Salmon 60', 81'; Mtiliga (yellow card) 71'	Report	Drenthe (yellow card) 33'; Hofs (yellow card) 59'; van Hooijdonk 86' (pen.)	Stadium: Rat Verlegh Stadion; Attendance: 16.480; Referee: Vink

28 January 2007 22	Feyenoord	3 – 1	RKC Waalwijk	Rotterdam
14:30 CEST	Lucius (yellow card) 15'; Drenthe (yellow card) 18'; de Guzman 26'; Bahia 35'; Vlaar (yellow card) 52'; Charisteas 85'	Report	Berger (yellow card) 38'; van den Bergh 53' (pen.) (yellow card) 61'	Stadium: De Kuip; Attendance: 40.500; Referee: Kuipers

4 February 2007 23	Ajax	4 – 1	Feyenoord	Amsterdam
12:30 CEST	Sneijder 20', 32', 87'; de Mul 34'; Emanuelson (yellow card) 48'; Davids (yellow card) 50'	Report	Serginho Greene (yellow card) 35'; Charisteas 42'	Stadium: Amsterdam Arena; Attendance: 50.490; Referee: van Egmond

11 February 2007 24	FC Twente	3 – 0	Feyenoord	Enschede
12:30 CEST	Heubach 25'; El Ahmadi (yellow card) 42'; Kennedy 58', 88'	Report	Derijck (yellow card) 26'; Lucius (yellow card) 63'	Stadium: Arke Stadion; Attendance: 13.250; Referee: Wiedemeijer

18 February 2007 25	Feyenoord	2 – 0	FC Utrecht	Rotterdam
14:30 CEST	de Guzman 7'; Charisteas 19'	Report	Pieters (yellow card) 75' (yellow-red card); van Buuren (yellow card) 90'	Stadium: De Kuip; Attendance: 38.000; Referee: Jol

25 February 2007 26	ADO Den Haag	3 – 3	Feyenoord	The Hague
12:30 CEST	Kolk (yellow card) 37'; Hoogendorp 40', 62' (pen.); Delorge 66'; Elia (yellow card) 78'; de Vries (red card) 87'	Report	Kolkka 19'; Charisteas 55', 73'; Vincken (yellow card) 79'	Stadium: Zuiderpark Stadion; Attendance: 8.814; Referee: Luinge

4 March 2007 27	Feyenoord	1 – 1	Roda JC	Rotterdam
14:30 CEST	Buijs (yellow card) 62'; Vincken (yellow card) 75'; van Hooijdonk (yellow card) 82' (goal) 84'; Vlaar (yellow card) 84'; Drenthe (yellow card) 90'	Report	Kah (yellow card) 5'; Cissé 57'; de Fauw (yellow card) 77'; Castro (yellow card) 81'	Stadium: De Kuip; Attendance: 42.000; Referee: van Sichem

11 March 2007 28	AZ	0 – 0	Feyenoord	Alkmaar
12:30 CEST	de Zeeuw (yellow card) 57'	Report	Castelen (yellow card) 19'; van Hooijdonk (yellow card) 38'	Stadium: DSB Stadion; Attendance: 16.529; Referee: Braamhaar

18 March 2007 29	Feyenoord	0 – 0	Willem II	Rotterdam
14:30 CEST		Report	Boutahar (yellow card) 40'	Stadium: De Kuip; Attendance: 41.000; Referee: Blom

1 April 2007 30	Vitesse	0 – 1	Feyenoord	Arnhem
12:30 CEST	Benson (yellow card) 30'; Blondelle (yellow card) 33'; Knol (yellow card) 37'	Report	Buijs (yellow card) 42'; Vlaar (yellow card) 57'; Drenthe (yellow card) 67'; van Hooijdonk 79'	Stadium: Gelredome; Attendance: 22.900; Referee: van de Velde (Belgium)

8 April 2007 31	Feyenoord	0 – 4	FC Groningen	Rotterdam
14:30 CEST	Charisteas (yellow card) 9'	Report	Meerdink (yellow card) 21'; Lovre 50', 64'; van de Laak 59', 70'	Stadium: De Kuip; Attendance: 46.000; Referee: Haverkort

15 April 2007 32	Heracles	4 – 1	Feyenoord	Almelo
14:30 CEST	Friend 18', 88'; Gluščević 64'; Smit 86'	Report	van Hooijdonk 48'	Stadium: Polman Stadion; Attendance: 8.500; Referee: van Hulten

22 April 2007 33	Feyenoord	1 – 1	NEC	Rotterdam
14:30 CEST	Charisteas (yellow card) 21'; Schreuder (yellow card) 36'; Castelen 53'; van Hooijdonk (yellow card) 65'	Report	Lorenzo Davids (yellow card) 16'; El Akchaoui (yellow card) 47'; Denneboom 57'	Stadium: De Kuip; Attendance: 40.000; Referee: Bossen

29 April 2007 34	Heerenveen	5 – 1	Feyenoord	Heerenveen
14:30 CEST	Alves 32', 65', 75' (pen.), 85'; Nilsson 79'	Report	Buijs 55' (yellow card) 71'; Bahia (yellow card) 74'; Vlaar (yellow card) 83'	Stadium: Abe Lenstra Stadion; Attendance: 26.000; Referee: Luinge

=== Eredivisie Play-offs UEFA Cup ===
10 May 2007 1	FC Groningen	2 – 1	Feyenoord	Groningen
20:00 CEST	Nevland 45'; van de Laak (yellow card) 46'; Sankoh 72'; Matthijs (yellow card) 76'	Report	Castelen 14'; Lucius (yellow card) 17'; de Guzman (red card) 21'; Hofs (yellow card) 75'	Stadium: Euroborg; Attendance: 19.466; Referee: Vink

13 May 2007 1	Feyenoord	1 – 1	FC Groningen	Rotterdam
14:30 CEST	van Hooijdonk 8'; Drenthe (yellow card) 67'	Report	Meerdink (yellow card) 25'; Levchenko (yellow card) 50'; Kruiswijk (yellow card) 51'; van de Laak (yellow card) 68'; Fledderus (yellow card) 71'; Lovre 73'	Stadium: De Kuip; Attendance: 18.000; Referee: Haverkort

=== KNVB Cup ===
21 September 2006 2	BV Veendam	2 – 3	Feyenoord	Veendam
20:00 CEST	Bizimana 11'; Buurmeijer 71'		Lucius 27'; Bahia 66'; Boussaboun 89'	Stadium: De Langeleegte; Attendance: 6.500; Referee: unknown

8 November 2006 3	RKC Waalwijk	3 – 2 (a.e.t.)	Feyenoord	Waalwijk
20:45 CEST	van Diemen 58'; Fuchs 96'; Keller 108'		Lucius 83'; Keller 101' (o.g.)	Stadium: Mandemakers Stadion; Attendance: 3.500; Referee: unknown

=== UEFA Cup ===
14 September 2006 1st Round	(Bulgaria) Lokomotiv Sofia	2 – 2	Feyenoord	Sofia
20:15 CEST	Genkov 5'; Dafchev 29'; Varbanov (yellow card) 48'; Antunovic (yellow card) 69'	report	Lucius 45+4' (yellow card) 63'; Greene 60' (yellow card) 75'; de Guzmán (yellow card) 90+1'	Stadium: Bulgarska Armia Stadion; Attendance: 8.000; Referee: Sandmoen (Norway); Assistant referees: Sundet (Norway); Larsen (Norway); Fourth official: Edvartsen (Norway)

28 September 2006 1st Round	Feyenoord	0 – 0	Lokomotiv Sofia (Bulgaria)	Rotterdam
19:45 CEST	Boussaboun (yellow card) 10'; van Hooijdonk (yellow card) 25'	report	Ivanov (yellow card) 21'; Markov (yellow card) 52'; Orachev (yellow card) 67'; Savić (yellow card) 82'	Stadium: De Kuip; Attendance: 22.000; Referee: Bebek (Croatia); Assistant referees: Novosel (Croatia); Petrovic (Croatia); Fourth official: Supraha (Croatia)

19 October 2006 Group Stage Group E	(Switzerland) Basel	1 – 1	Feyenoord	Basel
20:15 CEST	Eduardo 60'; Ba (yellow card) 73'	report	Léonard (yellow card) 12'; Bahia (yellow card) 56'; Huysegems 76'; Saidi (yellow card) 90'	Stadium: St. Jakob-Park; Attendance: 16.000; Referee: McDonald (Scotland); Assistant referees: Cryans (Scotland); Bee (Scotland); Fourth official: Murray (Scotland)

23 November 2006 Group Stage Group E	Feyenoord	0 – 0	Blackburn Rovers (England)	Rotterdam
20:45 CEST	Lucius (yellow card) 25'; Drenthe (yellow card) 55'	report	Savage (yellow card) 71'	Stadium: De Kuip; Attendance: 35.000; Referee: Kircher (Germany); Assistant referees: Henes (Germany); Schiffner (Germany); Fourth official: Schmidt (Germany)

30 November 2006 Group Stage Group E	(France) AS Nancy	3 – 0	Feyenoord	Nancy
20:45 CEST	Puygrenier 22'; Kim 42'; Zerka 65' (pen.)	report	Buijs (yellow card) 60'; Drenthe (yellow card) 60' (yellow-red card); Saidi (yellow card) 65'	Stadium: Stade Marcel Picot; Attendance: 19.000; Referee: Berntsen (Norway); Assistant referees: Randen (Norway); Nebben (Norway); Fourth official: Moen (Norway)

13 December 2006 Group Stage Group E	Feyenoord	3 – 1	Wisła Kraków (Poland)	Rotterdam
20:45 CEST	Hofs 16'; de Guzmán 41'; Kolkka (yellow card) 57'; Charisteas 67'; Greene (yellow card) 76'	report	Brożek 23'; Głowacki (yellow card) 45+1'; Thwaite (yellow card) 77'; Dudka (red card) 79'	Stadium: De Kuip; Attendance: 19.000; Referee: Dondarini (Italy); Assistant referees: Stagnoli (Italy); Biasutto (Italy); Fourth official: Squillace (Italy)

15 February 2007 Round of 32	Feyenoord	DISQ	Tottenham Hotspur (England)	Rotterdam
20:30 CEST		report		Stadium: De Kuip; Attendance: - Referee: - Assistant referees: - - Fourth official: -

22 February 2007 Round of 32	(England) Tottenham Hotspur	DISQ	Feyenoord	London
21:00 CEST		report		Stadium: White Hart Lane; Attendance: - Referee: - Assistant referees: - - Fourth official: -

=== Friendlies ===
11 July 2006	VV Katwijk	1 – 0	Feyenoord	Katwijk
	van Ommeren 22'			Stadium: De Krom; Attendance: unknown Referee: unknown

15 July 2006	FC Boszoom	0 – 18	Feyenoord	Rotterdam
			De Ceulaer 51', 55', 80', 82', 86'; Boussaboun 10', 31', 32', 42'; van Hooijdonk 50', 68', 84'; Pardo 60', 78'; Bahia 45'; Biseswar 30'; Collen 39'; Vincken 89'	Stadium: Boszoom Zuid; Attendance: unknown Referee: unknown

18 July 2006	RKSV Halsteren	1 – 8	Feyenoord	Halsteren
	Roeken 62'		Hofs 9', 25', 40', 45'; Pardo 35'; De Ceulaer 49'; Boussaboun 50'; Abubakari 73'	Stadium: De Beek; Attendance: unknown Referee: unknown

22 July 2006	RKSV Schijndel	0 – 6	Feyenoord	Schijndel
			van Hooijdonk (??); Hofs (??); Bahia (??); Boussaboun (??)	Stadium: Zuideinderpark; Attendance: unknown Referee: unknown

25 July 2006	SV Babberich	0 – 2	Feyenoord	Babberich
			de Guzmán 13'; De Ceulaer 85'	Stadium: De Buitenboom; Attendance: unknown Referee: unknown

28 July 2006	AGOVV	0 – 5	Feyenoord	Apeldoorn
			Hofs 9'; Lucius 18', 68'; Kuyt 25', 55'	Stadium: Sportpark Berg & Bos; Attendance: unknown Referee: unknown

1 August 2006	Feyenoord	3 – 0	Helmond Sport	Barendrecht
	Hofs 1', 14', 36'			Stadium: Sportpark Smitshoek; Attendance: unknown Referee: unknown

6 August 2006	Feyenoord	2 – 0	Middlesbrough (England)	Rotterdam
	Huysegems 16'; Kuyt 55'; De Ceulaer (yellow card)		Riggott (yellow card)	Stadium: De Kuip; Attendance: unknown Referee: unknown

8 August 2006	Feyenoord	0 – 1	Chelsea (England)	Rotterdam
	De Ceulaer (yellow card)		Lampard 51'	Stadium: De Kuip; Attendance: unknown Referee: unknown

12 August 2006	(England) Reading	2 – 1	Feyenoord	Reading
	Convey 22'; Ingimarsson 24'		De Ceulaer 63'	Stadium: Madejski Stadium; Attendance: unknown Referee: unknown

9 January 2007 1/2 Final EFES Pilsen Cup	Feyenoord	2 – 1	Galatasaray (Turkey)	Aksu
	van Hooijdonk 16'; Vincken 60'; Derijck (yellow card); Anes Ribeiro (yellow card)		Necati 43' (pen.); Yilmaz (yellow card)	Stadium: Aksu Mardan Sports Complex; Attendance: unknown Referee: Mercanli

11 January 2007 Final EFES Pilsen Cup	Feyenoord	1 – 2	Werder Bremen (Germany)	Aksu
	Charisteas 85'; Hofs (yellow card)		Naldo 44'; Vranješ 48'	Stadium: Aksu Mardan Sports Complex; Attendance: unknown Referee: Deda

== Player details ==
No.	Pos	Nat	Player	Total		Eredivisie + Play-offs		KNVB Cup		UEFA cup	
No.	Pos	Nat	Player	Apps	Goals	Apps	Goals	Apps	Goals	Apps	Goals
2	DF	(Tunisia) TUN	Karim Saidi	17	0	12+1	0	1	0	3	0
3	DF	(Belgium) BEL	Timothy Derijck	20	1	18	1	0	0	2	0
4	DF	(Brazil) BRA	André Bahia	38	3	29+2	2	2	1	5	0
6	MF	(Netherlands) NED	Theo Lucius	35	8	27+2	5	2	2	4	1
7	MF	(Netherlands) NED	Danny Buijs	37	5	27+2	5	2	0	6	0
8	MF	(Canada) CAN	Jacob Lensky	1	0	1	0	0	0	0	0
8	FW	(Belgium) BEL	Benjamin De Ceulaer	2	0	2	0	0	0	0	0
9	FW	(Netherlands) NED	Pierre van Hooijdonk	34	6	26+2	5+1	2	0	4	0
10	MF	(Netherlands) NED	Nicky Hofs	27	8	19+2	7	2	0	4	1
11	FW	(Belgium) BEL	Stein Huysegems	34	7	25+2	6	1	0	6	1
14	MF	(Chile) CHI	Sebastián Pardo	13	0	10	0	1	0	2	0
15	FW	(Greece) GRE	Angelos Charisteas	34	10	28+1	9	0	0	5	1
16	MF	(Netherlands) NED	Alfred Schreuder	11	0	10+1	0	0	0	0	0
17	MF	(Belgium) BEL	Philippe Léonard	3	0	2	0	0	0	1	0
18	DF	(Netherlands) NED	Serginho Greene	30	1	22	0	2	0	6	1
19	FW	(Morocco) MAR	Ali Boussaboun	18	3	11	2	2	1	5	0
20	DF	(Netherlands) NED	Ron Vlaar	23	1	20+2	1	0	0	1	0
21	DF	(Netherlands) NED	Dwight Tiendalli	19	0	13+1	0	2	0	3	0
22	FW	(Finland) FIN	Joonas Kolkka	29	3	22+1	3	2	0	4	0
23	MF	(Ghana) GHA	Mohammed Abubakari	0	0	0	0	0	0	0	0
24	DF	(Netherlands) NED	Royston Drenthe	33	0	26+2	0	1	0	4	0
26	MF	(Netherlands) NED	Lorenzo Davids	1	0	0	0	1	0	0	0
28	FW	(Netherlands) NED	Romeo Castelen	14	2	12+2	1+1	0	0	0	0
29	FW	(Netherlands) NED	Tim Vincken	25	1	23	1	1	0	1	0
30	GK	(Netherlands) NED	Patrick Lodewijks	0	0	0	0	0	0	0	0
31	GK	(Netherlands) NED	Henk Timmer	42	0	32+2	0	2	0	6	0
32	GK	(Egypt) EGY	Sherif Ekramy	3	0	3	0	0	0	0	0
33	MF	(Netherlands) NED	Jonathan de Guzman	40	8	32+1	7	1	0	6	1
35	MF	(Netherlands) NED	Georgino Wijnaldum	3	0	3	0	0	0	0	0
39	DF	(Belgium) BEL	Pieter Collen	3	0	2+1	0	0	0	0	0

- Source: voetbal.com

== Transfers ==
In: Note: Flags indicate national team as defined under FIFA eligibility rules; some limited exceptions apply. Players may hold more than one non-FIFA nationality.

No.	Pos.	Nation	Player
6	MF	NED	Theo Lucius (from (Netherlands) PSV)
7	MF	NED	Danny Buijs (from (Netherlands) FC Groningen)
11	FW	BEL	Stein Huysegems (from (Netherlands) AZ)
15	FW	GRE	Angelos Charisteas (from (Netherlands) Ajax)
17	DF	BEL	Philippe Léonard (from (Belgium) Standard Liège)
21	DF	NED	Dwight Tiendalli (from (Netherlands) FC Utrecht)
22	FW	FIN	Joonas Kolkka (from (Netherlands) ADO Den Haag)
31	GK	NED	Henk Timmer (from (Netherlands) AZ)

Out: Note: Flags indicate national team as defined under FIFA eligibility rules; some limited exceptions apply. Players may hold more than one non-FIFA nationality.

No.	Pos.	Nation	Player
—	FW	BEL	Benjamin De Ceulaer (to (Netherlands) RKC Waalwijk)
—	MF	NED	Lorenzo Davids (to (Netherlands) NEC)
—	DF	USA	Cory Gibbs (to (England) Charlton Athletic)
—	MF	NED	Edwin de Graaf (to (Netherlands) NAC)
—	FW	CIV	Salomon Kalou (to (England) Chelsea)
—	FW	NED	Dirk Kuyt (to (England) Liverpool)
—	DF	DEN	Patrick Mtiliga (to (Netherlands) NAC)
—	FW	NGR	John Owoeri (to (Nigeria) Enyimba International F.C.)
—	DF	NED	Patrick Paauwe (to (France) Valenciennes)
—	DF	NED	Ferne Snoyl (to (Netherlands) NEC)
—	DF	NED	Gianni Zuiverloon (to (Netherlands) Heerenveen)
—	GK	NED	Maikel Aerts (loan to (Netherlands) Willem II)
—	MF	NED	Jeffrey Altheer (loan to (Netherlands) Excelsior)
—	FW	NED	Diego Biseswar (loan to (Netherlands) Heracles)
—	DF	NED	Pascal Bosschaart (loan to (Netherlands) ADO Den Haag)
—	FW	MAR	Ali Boussaboun (loan to (Netherlands) FC Utrecht)
—	DF	GHA	Christian Gyan (loan to (Netherlands) Excelsior)
—	MF	BRA	Sammuel (loan to (Brazil) America MG)

== Club ==
=== Coaching staff ===
Position	Staff
Manager	(Netherlands) Erwin Koeman to 3 may (Netherlands) Leo Beenhakker from 3 may
Assistant manager	(Netherlands) John Metgod (Netherlands) Henk Duut
Assistant manager / Goalkeeping coach	(Netherlands) Pim Doesburg

Last updated: 23 September 2017

=== Kit ===
Supplier: Kappa
Sponsor(s): Fortis

Home	Away	Goalkeeper

Last updated: 23 July 2013.
Source: Feyenoord
