= 2002 UEFA Super Cup =

- Match programme
- Event: UEFA Super Cup
Real Madrid	Feyenoord
(Spain)	(Netherlands)
3	1
- Date: 30 August 2002
- Venue: Stade Louis II, Monaco
- Man of the Match: Roberto Carlos (Real Madrid)
- Referee: Hugh Dallas (Scotland)
- Attendance: 18,284

The 2002 UEFA Super Cup was played on 30 August 2002 between Real Madrid of Spain and Feyenoord of the Netherlands. Real Madrid qualified by beating Bayer Leverkusen in the 2002 UEFA Champions League Final. Feyenoord had made it to the Super Cup after beating Borussia Dortmund in the 2002 UEFA Cup Final. Real Madrid won the match 3–1, securing their first Super Cup win.

== Venue ==
The Stade Louis II in Monaco has been the venue for the UEFA Super Cup every year since 1998. Built in 1985, the stadium is also the home of AS Monaco, who play in the French league system.

== Teams ==
Team	Qualification	Previous participation (bold indicates winners)
(Spain) Real Madrid	2001–02 UEFA Champions League winners	1998, 2000
(Netherlands) Feyenoord	2001–02 UEFA Cup winners	None

== Match ==
=== Details ===
30 August 2002
20:45 CEST

Real Madrid (Spain)	3–1	(Netherlands) Feyenoord
Paauwe 15' (o.g.); Roberto Carlos 21'; Guti 60'	Report	Van Hooijdonk 56'

Stade Louis II, Monaco
Attendance: 18,284
Referee: Hugh Dallas (Scotland)

**Real Madrid**	**Feyenoord**

GK	1	(Spain) Iker Casillas
RB	2	(Spain) Míchel Salgado
CB	6	(Spain) Iván Helguera
CB	4	(Spain) Fernando Hierro (c)
LB	3	(Brazil) Roberto Carlos
RM	14	(Spain) Guti	(substituted off) 71'
CM	24	(France) Claude Makélélé
CM	19	(Argentina) Esteban Cambiasso	(substituted off) 88'
LM	5	(France) Zinedine Zidane	(substituted off) 86'
SS	10	(Portugal) Luís Figo
CF	7	(Spain) Raúl
Substitutes:
GK	13	(Spain) César Sánchez
DF	15	(Spain) Raúl Bravo
DF	22	(Spain) Francisco Pavón	(substituted on) 88'
MF	8	(England) Steve McManaman
MF	16	(Brazil) Flávio Conceição
MF	21	(Argentina) Santiago Solari	(substituted on) 86'
FW	18	(Spain) Javier Portillo	(substituted on) 71'
Manager:
(Spain) Vicente del Bosque

GK	1	(Netherlands) Edwin Zoetebier
RB	2	(Ghana) Christian Gyan	(substituted off) 72'
CB	8	(Netherlands) Kees van Wonderen
CB	17	(Netherlands) Patrick Paauwe
LB	3	(Poland) Tomasz Rząsa
DM	6	(Netherlands) Paul Bosvelt (c)
RM	23	(Australia) Brett Emerton
CM	14	(Japan) Shinji Ono
CM	10	(Netherlands) Anthony Lurling
LM	7	(Ivory Coast) Bonaventure Kalou
CF	9	(Netherlands) Pierre van Hooijdonk
Substitutes:
GK	31	(Netherlands) Carlo l'Ami
DF	5	(Netherlands) Ramon van Haaren
DF	20	(Netherlands) Ferry de Haan
DF	27	(Netherlands) Civard Sprockel
MF	18	(Brazil) Leonardo
MF	19	(Belgium) Thomas Buffel	(substituted on) 72'
Manager:
(Netherlands) Bert van Marwijk

Man of the Match:
Roberto Carlos (Real Madrid)

Assistant referees:
Wilson Irvine (Scotland)
David Doig (Scotland)
Fourth official:
Stuart Dougal (Scotland)

**Match rules**

- 90 minutes
- 30 minutes of extra-time if necessary
- Penalty shootout if scores still level
- Seven named substitutes
- Maximum of three substitutions

== See also ==
- 2002–03 UEFA Champions League
- 2002–03 UEFA Cup
- 2002–03 Feyenoord season
- 2002–03 Real Madrid CF season
- Feyenoord in international football
- Real Madrid CF in international football
