= 1995–96 Eerste Divisie =

40th season of the second-tier football league in Netherlands

Eerste Divisie
- Season: 1995–96
- Champions: AZ
- Promoted: AZ
- Goals: 861
- Average goals/game: 2.81

The Dutch Eerste Divisie in the 1995–1996 season was contested by 18 teams. AZ won the championship. This was the first year teams earned three points for a win instead of two.

== New entrants ==
Relegated from the 1994–95 Eredivisie

- Dordrecht '90
- MVV

== Final ranking ==
Pos	Team	Pld	W	D	L	GF	GA	GD	Pts	Promotion or qualification
1	AZ	34	21	10	3	64	26	+38	73	Promotion to Eredivisie
2	FC Emmen	34	18	13	3	71	39	+32	67	Play-offs
3	FC Den Bosch	34	15	13	6	51	36	+15	58	Play-offs
4	Veendam	34	16	10	8	48	35	+13	58	Play-offs
5	VVV-Venlo	34	15	12	7	55	33	+22	57	Play-offs
6	Cambuur Leeuwarden	34	15	12	7	49	32	+17	57	Play-offs
7	Dordrecht '90	34	14	12	8	62	45	+17	54	
8	SC Heracles	34	14	8	12	56	50	+6	50	Play-offs
9	Telstar	34	13	11	10	42	38	+4	50	
10	HFC Haarlem	34	14	3	17	47	53	−6	45	
11	MVV	34	10	12	12	41	46	−5	42	
12	TOP Oss	34	8	15	11	46	50	−4	39	
13	RBC	34	11	6	17	35	51	−16	39	
14	FC Zwolle	34	7	12	15	37	43	−6	33	
15	ADO Den Haag	34	8	7	19	39	60	−21	31	
16	Excelsior	34	8	5	21	42	72	−30	29	
17	FC Eindhoven	34	5	11	18	41	75	−34	26	
18	Helmond Sport	34	6	4	24	35	77	−42	22	

== Promotion/relegation play-offs ==
In the promotion/relegation competition, eight entrants (six from this league and two from the Eredivisie) entered in two groups. The group winners were promoted to the Eredivisie.

=== Group 1 ===
Pos	Team	Pld	W	D	L	GF	GA	GD	Pts	Qualification
1	FC Volendam	6	6	0	0	10	2	+8	18	Remain in Eredivisie
2	SC Heracles	6	3	1	2	13	7	+6	10	
3	VVV-Venlo	6	1	1	4	3	9	−6	4	
4	FC Den Bosch	6	0	2	4	2	10	−8	2	

==== Round 1 ====
1996-05-11

FC Den Bosch	0 – 1	FC Volendam

VVV-Venlo	0 – 3	SC Heracles

==== Round 2 ====
1996-05-18

SC Heracles	2 – 0	FC Den Bosch

FC Volendam	1 – 0	VVV-Venlo

==== Round 3 ====
1996-05-21

FC Den Bosch	0 – 0	VVV-Venlo

FC Volendam	1 – 0	SC Heracles

==== Round 4 ====
1996-05-25

VVV-Venlo	2 – 0	FC Den Bosch

SC Heracles	1 – 2	FC Volendam

==== Round 5 ====
1996-05-28

VVV-Venlo	0 – 1	FC Volendam
		Nijholt 55'

De Koel, Venlo
Attendance: 1,844
Referee: Uilenberg

FC Den Bosch	2 – 2	SC Heracles
Gerver 26'; Nijhuis 61'		Klaver 10'; Holster 66'

De Vliert, Den Bosch
Attendance: 1,174
Referee: Jol

==== Round 6 ====
1996-06-01

FC Volendam	3 – 0	FC Den Bosch

SC Heracles	4 – 1	VVV-Venlo

=== Group 2 ===
Pos	Team	Pld	W	D	L	GF	GA	GD	Pts	Qualification
1	NEC Nijmegen	6	5	0	1	12	4	+8	15	Remain in Eredivisie
2	Veendam	6	3	1	2	8	7	+1	10	
3	FC Emmen	6	3	0	3	10	8	+2	9	
4	Cambuur Leeuwarden	6	0	1	5	2	13	−11	1	

==== Round 1 ====
1996-05-14

NEC Nijmegen	3 – 1	FC Emmen
Janssen 7'; Sumiala 65'; Pothuizen 73'		Alberda 10'

De Goffert, Nijmegen
Attendance: 4,500
Referee: Luinge

Cambuur Leeuwarden	2 – 2	Veendam
Van der Berg 73'; Oosterhof 90'		Radomski 10'; Oosting 19'

Cambuur Stadion, Leeuwarden
Attendance: 5,500
Referee: Temmink

==== Round 2 ====
1996-05-18

Veendam	1 – 0	NEC Nijmegen
Wiekens 88'

De Langeleegte, Veendam
Attendance: 4,777
Referee: Reygwart

FC Emmen	4 – 0	Cambuur Leeuwarden
Van Oostrum 21', 63'; Nurmela 70'; Stroeve 87'

Univé Stadion, Emmen
Attendance: 4,281
Referee: Uilenberg

==== Round 3 ====
1996-05-21

NEC Nijmegen	2 – 0	Cambuur Leeuwarden
Janssen 65' (pen.); Sumiala 82'

De Goffert, Nijmegen
Attendance: 5,500
Referee: Van Hulten

FC Emmen	2 – 1	Veendam

==== Round 4 ====
1996-05-25

Cambuur Leeuwarden	0 – 1	NEC Nijmegen
		Langerak 67'

Cambuur Stadion, Leeuwarden
Attendance: 4,250
Referee: Luyten

Veendam	1 – 0	FC Emmen

==== Round 5 ====
1996-05-28

Cambuur Leeuwarden	0 – 1	FC Emmen
		De Jonge 72'

Cambuur Stadion, Leeuwarden
Attendance: 4,000
Referee: Van der Ende

NEC Nijmegen	3 – 0	Veendam
Van Diemen 25'; Sumiala 49'; Pothuizen 71'

De Goffert, Nijmegen
Attendance: 8,100
Referee: Van Vliet

==== Round 6 ====
1996-06-01

FC Emmen	2 – 3	NEC Nijmegen
Drent 36'; Barmentloo 90'		Sumiala 23', 83'; De Kruyff 78' (o.g.)

Univé Stadion, Emmen
Attendance: 6,800
Referee: Temmink

Veendam	3 – 0	Cambuur Leeuwarden
do Nascimento 68', 90'; Wiekens 79'

De Langeleegte, Veendam
Attendance: 2,631
Referee: Koopman

== Attendances ==
#	Club	Average
1	AZ	5,349
2	Cambuur	4,978
3	Emmen	3,963
4	Veendam	3,841
5	Den Bosch	2,729
6	MVV	2,713
7	Zwolle	2,465
8	RBC	2,418
9	Oss	2,085
10	VVV	2,026
11	Haarlem	1,841
12	Helmond	1,807
13	Heracles	1,787
14	ADO	1,701
15	Dordrecht	1,624
16	Telstar	1,608
17	Eindhoven	1,546
18	Excelsior	1,006

== See also ==
- 1995–96 in Dutch football
- 1995–96 Eredivisie
- 1995–96 KNVB Cup
