= SS Empire Boy =

World War II merchant ship of the United Kingdom

History
- Name: SS Empire Boy (1941–42); SS Doorman (1942–47); SS Flandria (1947–51); SS Alice (1951–52); SS Hammonia (1952–54); SS Petra (1954–62); SS Anny (1962–65); MV Anny (1965–72); MV Tosco (1972–74)
- Owner: Ministry of War Transport (1941–42); Dutch Government (1942–47); NV Phs. Van Ommeren, Rotterdam (1947–48); Verenigde Tankkustvaart NV (1948–51); Ulric Thomas (1951–52); Bauermann & Metzendorf GmbH (1952–54); Regia Reederei & Warenhandel GmbH (1954–57); Rex Bauermann (1957–62); Vittorio Rossetti (1962–75); Tosco Sardi di Navigazione SpA (1975)
- Operator: F T Everard & Sons Ltd (1941–42); Netherlands Shipping & Trading Committee (1942–44); NV Hollandsche Stoomboot Maatschappij (1944–47); NV Phs. Van Ommeren, Rotterdam (1947–48); Verenigde Tankkustvaart NV (1948–51); S Stein KG, (1951–52); Bauermann & Metzendorf GmbH (1952–54); Regia Reederei & Warenhandel GmbH (1954–57); Olea Tankschiff GmbH (1957–62); Vittorio Rossetti (1962–75); Tosco Sardi di Navigazione SpA (1975)
- Port of registry: (United Kingdom) Goole (1941–42); (Netherlands) The Hague (1942–47); (Netherlands) Rotterdam (1947–51); (West Germany) Hamburg (1951–62); (Italy) Livorno (1962–71); (Italy) Cagliari (1971–75)
- Builder: Goole Shipbuilding and Repairing Co Ltd, Goole
- Yard number: 361
- Launched: 28 August 1941
- Completed: December 1941
- Out of service: June 1975
- Identification: UK Official Number 168776 (1941–47); IMO Number 5019331 (1962–75); Italian Official Number 535 (1962–71); Italian Official Number 359 (1971–75); Code Letters BCVJ (1941–42); Code Letters PDNO (1942–44); Code Letters PDRO (1944–47); Code Letters PCEF (1947–51)
- Fate: Scrapped

General characteristics
- Tonnage: 859 GRT (1941–54); 963 GRT (1954–75)
- Length: 188 ft 7 in (57.48 m) (1941–54); 64.60 m (211 ft 11.31 in) (1954–75)
- Beam: 31 ft 3 in (9.53 m)
- Depth: 14 ft (4.27 m)
- Propulsion: 1 × triple expansion steam engine (1941–65); 1 × 6-cylinder diesel engine (1965–75)
- Speed: 9 knots (17 km/h) (1941–65)

Empire Boy was an 859 GRT coastal tanker which was built in 1941 for the Ministry of War Transport (MoWT). Completed in December 1941, was transferred to the Dutch Government in 1942 and renamed Doorman. In 1947, she was sold into Dutch merchant service and renamed Flandria. In 1952, she was sold to a West German company and renamed Alice. She was lengthened in 1954 and renamed Hammonia and was later renamed Petra. In 1962, she was sold to an Italian company and renamed Anny. A new engine was fitted in 1965 and she was renamed Tosco in 1971, serving until scrapped in 1975.

== Description ==
The ship was built by Goole Shipbuilding & Repairing Co Ltd, Goole. She was yard number 361. Launched on 25 August 1941, she was completed in December 1941.

As built, the ship was 188 feet 7 inches (57.48 m) long, with a beam of 31 feet 3 inches (9.53 m) and a depth of 14 feet (4.27 m). She was propelled by a triple expansion steam engine which had cylinders of 15 inches (38 cm), 25 inches (64 cm) and 42 inches (110 cm) bore by 39 inches (99 cm) stroke. The engine was built by Amos & Smith Ltd, Hull. It developed 750 horsepower (560 kW) and could propel her at 9 knots (17 km/h). In 1965, the ship was re-engined with a 1,000 horsepower (750 kW) 6-cylinder Klöckner Humboldt Deutz diesel engine which had cylinders of 32 cm bore by 45 cm stroke.

== Career ==
Empire Boy's port of registry was Goole. She was operated under the management of F T Everard & Co Ltd. In 1942, Empire Boy was transferred to the Dutch Government and renamed Doorman. Her port of registry was The Hague. She was operated under the management of the Netherlands Shipping and Trading Committee. Management was transferred to NV Hollandsche Stoomboot Maatschappij in 1944. Doorman was a member of a number of convoys during the Second World War.

KX 13

Convoy KX 13 departed from Milford Haven on 8 January 1944 and arrived at Gibraltar on 18 January.

In 1947, Doorman was sold to NV Phs. Van Ommeren, Rotterdam. Her port of registry was Rotterdam. In 1948, she was sold Verenigde Tankkustvaart NV.

In 1951, Flandria was sold to Ulric Thomas and was renamed Alice. She was operated under the management of S Stein KG. Her port of registry was Hamburg. In 1952, she was sold to Bauermann & Metzendorf GmbH and renamed Hammonia. She was lengthened to 64.60 metres (211 ft 11 in). In 1954, Alice was sold to Regia Reederei & Warenhandel GmbH and was renamed Petra. She was sold in 1957 to Rex Bauermann, operating under the management of Olea Tankschiff GmbH. In 1962, Petra was sold to Vittorio Rosetti and was renamed Anny. Her port of registry was changed to Livorno. In 1965, a new diesel engine was fitted. In 1971, she was renamed Tosco and her port of registry was changed to Cagliari. She was sold to Tosco Sardi di Navigazione SpA in 1975. Tosco was scrapped at La Spezia in June 1975 by Demolizione Decomar SpA.

== Official Numbers and Code Letters ==
Official Numbers were a forerunner to IMO Numbers. Empire Boy and Doorman had the UK Official Number 168714. Anny had the Italian Official Number 535 and Tosco had the Italian Official Number 359. Both Anny and Tosco were assigned the IMO Number 5019331.

Empire Boy used the Code Letters BCVJ. Doorman used the Code Letters PDNO, which were changed to PDRO in 1944. Flandria used the Code Letters PCEF.
