= Lorenzo Davids =

Dutch association football player

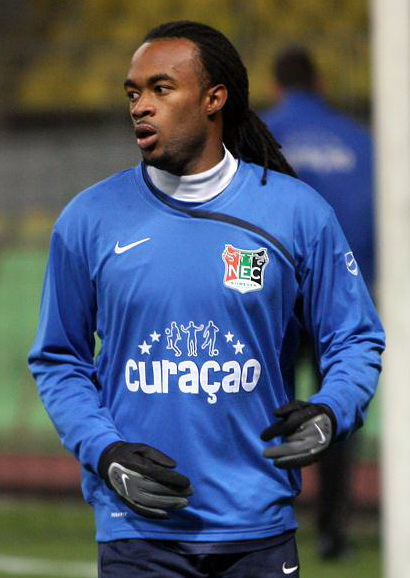

Personal information
- Full name: Lorenzo Davids
- Date of birth: 4 September 1986 (age 40)
- Place of birth: Paramaribo, Suriname
- Height: 1.80 m (5 ft 11 in)
- Position: Midfielder

Youth career
- 1993–1999: SC Voorland
- 1999–2001: ASC Waterwijk
- 2001–2003: Omniworld
- 2003–2004: Utrecht
- 2004–2006: Feyenoord

Senior career*
Years	Team	Apps	(Gls)
2006–2007	Feyenoord	1	(0)
2007–2011	NEC	131	(5)
2011–2012	FC Augsburg	20	(0)
2012–2013	Bournemouth	3	(0)
2013–2015	Randers	9	(0)
2015	SCH Nijmegen		
2016–2020	DFS		
2020–2022	SV Nijmegen		
2022–	Quick 1888		

International career
2007–2008	Netherlands U-21	3	(0)
- * Club domestic league appearances and goals as of 18 June 2015

Lorenzo Davids (born 4 September 1986) is a Dutch footballer who plays as a midfielder for amateur side Quick 1888.

== Club career ==
=== Feyenoord ===
Lorenzo Davids started playing football at a young age and joined various youth teams, with the likes of SC Voorland, ASC Waterwijk, FC Omniworld and FC Utrecht before joining Feyenoord, where he started his professional football career. Having been an unused substitute through the first six months of the 2006–07 season at Feyenoord, Davids made one appearance, which was the cup match before leaving the club by joining N.E.C. on a two-and-a-half-year contract.

=== NEC ===
Davids made his debut, coming on as a substitute for Patrick Pothuizen in the 58th minute in a 1–0 loss against Roda JC on 10 February 2007. He made several appearance for the club towards the end of the season. At N.E.C., Davids established himself in the first team, playing in left or central midfield, though sometime, he played in defence and continued to retain his first team status throughout his time at N.E.C. before leaving the club. The following season, Davids would score his first goal in a 5–1 win over Groningen on 28 October 2007 and four weeks later on 25 November 2007, Davids scored again, with his second goal, in a 3–2 loss against Utrecht. On 30 December 2007, Davids received a straight red card for a serious foul, in a 3–0 loss against Willem II. At the end of the 2007–08 season, Davids made 29 appearances, scoring twice.

The next season (2008–09), Davids signed a new contract with the club, which kept him until 2011. He went on to play all the matches in the league, without being absent for injuries or suspensions and be left out of the squad. During the season, Davids made his European debut against Romanian side Dinamo București, which N.E.C. won 1–0 and since appeared for the club's entire match in the UEFA Cup. Davids scored the most important and memorable goal in a 1–0 win over AZ on 19 September 2009. At the end of the 2009–10 season, Davids won the club's player of the year award. In his last season, Davids made 29 appearances and scored twice against Heracles Almelo and VVV Venlo.

=== FC Augsburg ===
As his contract expired in the 2010–11 season, Davids signed a two-year contract for German side FC Augsburg on a free transfer. Davids made his debut in the opening game of the season, a 2–2 draw against Freiburg. However, his time at Augsburg was 'forgettable' as his first team opportunities soon were limited despite making twenty appearances for the club. The following season, under new manager Markus Weinzierl, Davids was sent to the club's reserve side. On the last day of the transfer window, Davids was released by the club despite having one year left on his contract.

=== AFC Bournemouth ===
On 31 August 2012, Davids signed a two-year contract with League One side AFC Bournemouth on the same day he was released. Upon joining the club, Lorenzo said that joining the club was a new challenge and also a new start for him. He also revealed he followed English Football and a dream came true to play in England. However, Davids's debut was delayed over his knee injury. On 29 September 2012, Davids made his debut, making his first start and playing 90 minutes, in a 2–1 loss against Walsall. Unfortunately, his first team opportunities was limited after the return of manager Eddie Howe and he was released by the club on the last day of the transfer window.

=== Randers FC ===
In the winter transfer window, Davids was linked a move back to Netherlands by joining Dutch side Willem II. But on last day of the transfer window, he left Bournemouth by mutual consent and joined the Danish side Randers FC on a two-and-a-half-year contract. Upon joining the club, Manager Colin Todd told the club's website commenting favourably on the player's emphasis on speed and technique. On 28 March 2013, Davids made his debut for the club in a 0–0 draw against OB.

== International career ==
He earned a first call-up for Netherlands U-21 in October 2007.

== Personal life ==
Davids is the cousin of international footballer Edgar Davids and is 13 years Edgar's junior. He was born in Paramaribo, the capital city of Suriname before moving to Rotterdam with his family aged four. He is married to Samantha Banket and the couple have a son and 2 daughters. They lost their 4-year-old daughter Jeazley in April 2016.
