= 1995–96 in Dutch football =

The 1995–96 season in Dutch football saw holders Ajax Amsterdam winning the title in the Eredivisie once again, while PSV Eindhoven won the Dutch National Cup. Starting from this season a victory yields three points instead of two.

== Super Cup ==
August 16, 1995

| Feyenoord | 1–2 (AET) | Ajax |
|---|---|---|
| Larsson 27' | | R. de Boer 25'; Kluivert 102'(golden goal) |

De Kuip, Rotterdam
Attendance: 25,000
Referee: Van der Ende

== Eredivisie ==
| Position | Team | Points | Played | Won | Drawn | Lost | For | Against | Difference |
|---|---|---|---|---|---|---|---|---|---|
| 1 | Ajax Amsterdam | 83 | 34 | 26 | 5 | 3 | 97 | 24 | +73 |
| 2 | PSV Eindhoven | 77 | 34 | 24 | 5 | 5 | 97 | 25 | +72 |
| 3 | Feyenoord Rotterdam | 63 | 34 | 18 | 9 | 7 | 66 | 36 | +30 |
| 4 | Roda JC | 57 | 34 | 15 | 12 | 7 | 51 | 35 | +16 |
| 5 | Vitesse Arnhem | 53 | 34 | 15 | 8 | 11 | 48 | 44 | +4 |
| 6 | Sparta Rotterdam | 53 | 34 | 14 | 11 | 9 | 53 | 53 | 0 |
| 7 | SC Heerenveen | 53 | 34 | 14 | 11 | 9 | 66 | 68 | -2 |
| 8 | NAC Breda | 52 | 34 | 14 | 10 | 10 | 58 | 44 | +14 |
| 9 | FC Groningen | 49 | 34 | 12 | 13 | 9 | 48 | 45 | +3 |
| 10 | FC Twente | 48 | 34 | 14 | 6 | 14 | 46 | 55 | -9 |
| 11 | RKC Waalwijk | 44 | 34 | 11 | 11 | 12 | 44 | 44 | 0 |
| 12 | Willem II Tilburg | 39 | 34 | 9 | 12 | 13 | 53 | 59 | -6 |
| 13 | Fortuna Sittard | 31 | 34 | 6 | 13 | 15 | 27 | 54 | -27 |
| 14 | De Graafschap | 29 | 34 | 6 | 11 | 17 | 37 | 66 | -29 |
| 15 | FC Utrecht | 28 | 34 | 6 | 10 | 18 | 27 | 59 | -31 |
| 16 | FC Volendam | 27 | 34 | 6 | 9 | 19 | 29 | 65 | -36 |
| 17 | NEC Nijmegen | 25 | 34 | 6 | 7 | 21 | 33 | 73 | -40 |
| 18 | Go Ahead Eagles | 22 | 34 | 5 | 7 | 22 | 40 | 71 | -31 |

- Champions League : Ajax Amsterdam
- Cup Winners Cup: PSV Eindhoven
- UEFA Cup: Feyenoord Rotterdam
- UEFA Cup: Roda JC

=== Topscorers ===
| Position | Player | Nationality | Club | Goals |
|---|---|---|---|---|
| 1 | Luc Nilis | (Belgium) | PSV Eindhoven | 21 |
| 2 | Mariano Bombarda | (Spain) | FC Groningen | 19 |
| 3 | Graham Arnold | (Australia) | NAC Breda | 16 |
| | Dennis de Nooijer | (Netherlands) | Sparta Rotterdam | 16 |
| 5 | Patrick Kluivert | (Netherlands) | Ajax Amsterdam | 15 |

=== Awards ===
==== Dutch Footballer of the Year ====
- 1995 — Luc Nilis (PSV Eindhoven)
- 1996 — Ronald de Boer (Ajax Amsterdam)

==== Dutch Golden Shoe Winner ====
- 1995 — Danny Blind (Ajax Amsterdam)
- 1996 — Danny Blind (Ajax Amsterdam)

=== Ajax Winning Squad 1995-'96 ===
Goal

- (Netherlands) Fred Grim
- (Netherlands) Edwin van der Sar

Defence

- (Netherlands) Danny Blind
- (Netherlands) Frank de Boer
- (Netherlands) Winston Bogarde
- (Brazil) Marcio Santos
- (Netherlands) Michael Reiziger
- (Netherlands) Sonny Silooy

Midfield

- (Netherlands) Ronald de Boer
- (Netherlands) Edgar Davids
- (Netherlands) Denny Landzaat
- (Finland) Jari Litmanen
- (Netherlands) Kiki Musampa
- (Netherlands) Martijn Reuser
- (Netherlands) Arnold Scholten

Attack

- (Netherlands) Dave van den Bergh
- (Russia) Andrey Demchenko
- (Nigeria) Finidi George
- (Netherlands) Peter Hoekstra
- (Nigeria) Nwankwo Kanu
- (Netherlands) Patrick Kluivert
- (Netherlands) Marc Overmars
- (Netherlands) Dennis Schulp
- (Netherlands) Ignacio Tuhuteru
- (Netherlands) Nordin Wooter

Management

- (Netherlands) Louis van Gaal (Coach)
- (Netherlands) Gerard van der Lem (Assistant)
- (Netherlands) Bobby Haarms (Assistant)

== Eerste Divisie ==
| Position | Team | Points | Played | Won | Drawn | Lost | For | Against | Difference |
|---|---|---|---|---|---|---|---|---|---|
| 1 | AZ Alkmaar | 73 | 34 | 21 | 10 | 3 | 64 | 26 | +38 |
| 2 | FC Emmen | 67 | 34 | 18 | 13 | 3 | 71 | 39 | +32 |
| 3 | FC Den Bosch | 58 | 34 | 15 | 13 | 6 | 51 | 36 | +15 |
| 4 | BV Veendam | 58 | 34 | 16 | 19 | 8 | 48 | 35 | +13 |
| 5 | VVV-Venlo | 57 | 34 | 15 | 12 | 7 | 55 | 33 | +22 |
| 6 | Cambuur Leeuwarden | 57 | 34 | 15 | 12 | 7 | 49 | 32 | +17 |
| 7 | Dordrecht '90 | 54 | 34 | 14 | 12 | 8 | 62 | 45 | +17 |
| 8 | Heracles Almelo | 50 | 34 | 14 | 8 | 12 | 56 | 50 | +6 |
| 9 | Telstar | 50 | 34 | 13 | 11 | 10 | 42 | 38 | +4 |
| 10 | HFC Haarlem | 45 | 34 | 14 | 3 | 17 | 47 | 53 | -6 |
| 11 | MVV Maastricht | 42 | 34 | 10 | 12 | 12 | 41 | 46 | -5 |
| 12 | TOP Oss | 39 | 34 | 8 | 15 | 11 | 46 | 50 | -4 |
| 13 | RBC Roosendaal | 39 | 34 | 11 | 6 | 17 | 35 | 51 | -16 |
| 14 | FC Zwolle | 33 | 34 | 7 | 12 | 15 | 37 | 43 | -6 |
| 15 | FC Den Haag | 31 | 34 | 8 | 7 | 20 | 39 | 60 | -21 |
| 16 | Excelsior Rotterdam | 29 | 34 | 8 | 5 | 21 | 42 | 72 | -30 |
| 17 | FC Eindhoven | 26 | 34 | 5 | 11 | 18 | 41 | 75 | -34 |
| 18 | Helmond Sport | 22 | 34 | 6 | 4 | 24 | 35 | 77 | -42 |

== Promotion and relegation ==
=== Group A ===
| Position | Team | Points | Played | Won | Drawn | Lost | For | Against | Difference |
|---|---|---|---|---|---|---|---|---|---|
| 1 | FC Volendam | 18 | 6 | 6 | 0 | 0 | 10 | 2 | +8 |
| 2 | Heracles Almelo | 10 | 6 | 3 | 1 | 2 | 13 | 7 | +6 |
| 3 | VVV-Venlo | 4 | 6 | 1 | 1 | 4 | 3 | 9 | -6 |
| 4 | FC Den Bosch | 2 | 6 | 0 | 2 | 4 | 2 | 10 | -8 |

=== Group B ===
| Position | Team | Points | Played | Won | Drawn | Lost | For | Against | Difference |
|---|---|---|---|---|---|---|---|---|---|
| 1 | NEC Nijmegen | 15 | 6 | 5 | 0 | 1 | 12 | 4 | +8 |
| 2 | BV Veendam | 10 | 6 | 3 | 1 | 2 | 8 | 7 | +1 |
| 3 | FC Emmen | 9 | 6 | 3 | 0 | 3 | 10 | 8 | +2 |
| 4 | Cambuur Leeuwarden | 1 | 6 | 0 | 1 | 5 | 2 | 13 | -11 |

- Stayed : NEC Nijmegen and FC Volendam

== KNVB Cup ==
Quarter-finals
February 29
FC Twente | 1
PSV Eindhoven | 3
February 28
VVV-Venlo | 0
Roda JC | 2
February 28
Sparta Rotterdam | 1
Cambuur Leeuwarden | 0
February 29
MVV Maastricht | 1
Feyenoord Rotterdam | 2

Semi-finals
May 3
PSV Eindhoven | 3
Roda JC | 1
April 7
Sparta Rotterdam | 1
Feyenoord Rotterdam | 0

Final
May 16 - Rotterdam
PSV Eindhoven | 5
Sparta Rotterdam | 2

=== Final ===
May 16, 1996

| PSV Eindhoven | 5 – 2 | Sparta Rotterdam |
|---|---|---|
| Cocu 7'; Vink 14'; Veldman 65' (own goal); Jonk 87'; Van der Doelen 90' | | Van der Meer 45'; D. de Nooijer 79' |

De Kuip, Rotterdam
Attendance: Unknown
Referee: Van der Ende
