= José Fortes Rodríguez =

Spanish footballer (born 1972)

Personal information
- Full name: José Fortes Rodríguez
- Date of birth: 13 March 1972 (age 54)
- Place of birth: Beariz, Ourense, Spain
- Height: 1.79 m (5 ft 10 in)
- Position: Defender

Senior career*
Years	Team	Apps	(Gls)
1994–2004	AZ	164	(5)
2005–2006	RBC Roosendaal	34	(0)
Total		198	(5)
- * Club domestic league appearances and goals

José Fortes Rodríguez (born 13 March 1972) is a Spanish former professional footballer who played as a defender for AZ and RBC Roosendaal in the Netherlands. He was known as a fierce defender, but saw his career cut short due to injuries and controversial episodes.

== Career ==
Fortes Rodríguez was suspended by his former club RBC in November 2005, after saying in an interview that referee René Temmink shared features with a person suffering from Down syndrome. He was released in 2006 after the club had relegated from the Eredivisie.

== After football ==
Since retiring from football in 2006, Fortes Rodríguez has worked as a scout for his former club AZ. He began working as an assistant to football agent Mino Raiola in May 2015, and helped broker deals for Steven Berghuis as well as representing numerous AZ players.

== Career statistics ==
Appearances and goals by club, season and competition
Club	Season	League			KNVB Beker		Total		Total	
Club	Season	Division	Apps	Goals	Apps	Goals	Apps	Goals	Apps	Goals
AZ Alkmaar	1994–95	Eerste Divisie	9	1						
AZ Alkmaar	1995–96	Eerste Divisie	30	1						
AZ Alkmaar	1996–97	Eredivisie	26	1	1	0	–		27	1
AZ Alkmaar	1997–98	Eerste Divisie	27	1	0	0	–		27	1
AZ Alkmaar	1998–99	Eredivisie	18	0	1	0	–		19	0
AZ Alkmaar	1999–2000	Eredivisie	0	0	0	0	–		0	0
AZ Alkmaar	2000–01	Eredivisie	11	0	1	0	–		12	0
AZ Alkmaar	2001–02	Eredivisie	8	0	0	0	–		8	0
AZ Alkmaar	2002–03	Eredivisie	16	0	0	0	–		16	0
AZ Alkmaar	2003–04	Eredivisie	19	1	1	0	–		20	1
AZ Alkmaar	2004–05	Eredivisie	0	0	0	0	1 (Note: Appearance in UEFA Europa League)	0	1	0
AZ Alkmaar	Total		164	5	4	0	1	0	169	5
RBC Roosendaal	2004–05	Eredivisie	14	0	0	0	3 (Note: Appearances in relegation play-offs)	0	17	0
RBC Roosendaal	2005–06	Eredivisie	20	0	0	0	–		20	0
RBC Roosendaal	Total		34	0	0	0	3	0	37	0
Career total			198	5	4	0	4	0	206	5
