= Kassim Bizimana =

Burundian striker

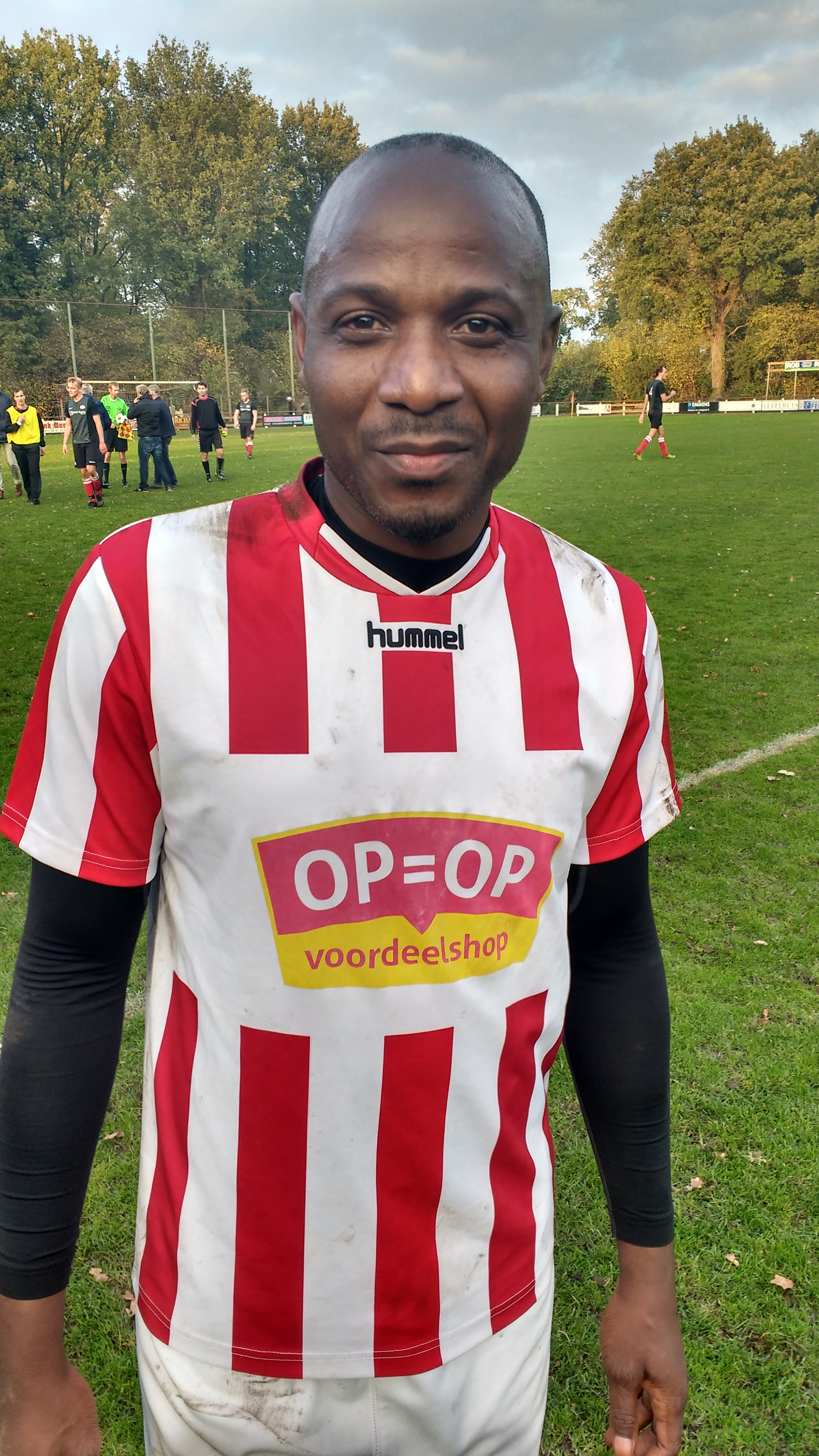
- Bizimana with Gieten in 2018

Personal information
- Date of birth: December 29, 1985 (age 40)
- Place of birth: Bujumbura, Burundi
- Position: Striker

Youth career
- –2001: Achilles 1894
- 2001–2003: Heerenveen
- 2003–2005: Groningen

Senior career*
Years	Team	Apps	(Gls)
2005	Groningen	4	(0)
2005–2009	Veendam	72	(13)
2009–2010	Sneek Wit Zwart		
2010–2012	Velocitas 1897		
2012	Berkum		
2012–2013	Flevo Boys		
2013–2016	PKC '83		
2017–2018	Pelikaan-S		
2018–2019	Gieten		(15)

International career
2008	Burundi	2	(0)
- * Club domestic league appearances and goals

Kassim Bizimana (born 29 December 1985) is a Burundian former footballer who played as a striker.

== Career ==
Bizimana played for the youth teams of SC Heerenveen and Achilles 1894. He began his professional career in 2004 with FC Groningen. His first professional game was on 22 October 2004 against Willem II Tilburg, when he replaced Jack Tuyp in the 74th minute. Groningen lost 4–2.

In July 2005, he was transferred to BV Veendam.

His spell at Veendam would prove to be his last in professional football, as he moved to the Hoofdklasse club Sneek Wit Zwart in 2009. After this, he played in the Hoofdklasse side Velocitas 1897 (2010–12), Berkum (2012), Flevo Boys (2012–13) and PKC '83 (2013–16). In 2017, he started playing for Pelikaan-S. After a year he left for VV Gieten, where he left halfway through the season. Despite this, he became the club's top scorer with 15 goals.

== International career ==
He has represented his homeland, Burundi, at international level, and in 2007 was a candidate for the Rwanda national football team.

== Statistics ==
Season	Club	League	Games	Goals
2004/05	FC Groningen	Eredivisie	4	0
2005/06	BV Veendam	Eerste Divisie	15	0
2006/07	BV Veendam	Eerste Divisie	30	12
2007/08	BV Veendam	Eerste Divisie	8	0
2008/09	BV Veendam	Eerste Divisie	19	10

== Personal ==
He holds a Dutch passport.
