= Brian Pinas =

Dutch footballer (born 1978)

Personal information
- Full name: Ulrich Brian Pinas
- Date of birth: 29 December 1978 (age 47)
- Place of birth: Rotterdam, Netherlands
- Height: 1.75 m (5 ft 9 in)
- Position: Winger

Youth career
- DHC Delft
- Ajax
- Feyenoord

Senior career*
Years	Team	Apps	(Gls)
1996–1998	Feyenoord	0	(0)
1997–1998	Newcastle United	0	(0)
1998–1999	Feyenoord	4	(0)
1999–2003	→ Excelsior (loan)	92	(14)
2003–2005	Groningen	43	(2)
2005–2006	Cercle Brugge	32	(6)
2006–2007	NAC Breda	23	(1)
2007–2010	Dordrecht	44	(2)
2010–2011	RVVH		
- * Club domestic league appearances and goals

Ulrich Brian Pinas (born 29 December 1978) is a Dutch former professional footballer who played as a winger.

== Career ==
Pinas was born in Rotterdam. He started playing football at DHC Delft, an amateur football club in the province of South Holland in the Netherlands. He actually started as a goalkeeper, but discovered soon enough that he was better at other positions on the field. Oddly enough, Pinas was discovered by Ajax, and not their rivals Feyenoord, the biggest team in Rotterdam, where Pinas was living. But due to the distance being too long between Amsterdam and Rotterdam, Pinas soon did move to Feyenoord.

In 1996, when Pinas was playing for the reserves of Feyenoord, he was discovered by Newcastle United at a youth tournament in Groningen. In this short spell at Newcastle he never made a first team appearance for the team. Pinas eventually returned to Feyenoord because of the lack of playtime and the departure of his best friends at the team, Faustino Asprilla and Jon Dahl Tomasson.

On his arrival at Newcastle in 1997, Pinas was ridiculed by The Sun newspaper with regards to his surname's closeness to penis. The editorial joked "Pity soccer star Brian Pinas." "The first time a referee takes his name, he'll get sent off for using foul language".

Having returned to Feyenoord, Pinas soon made it to the A-team under the influence of coach Leo Beenhakker. But despite his move from the reserves to the first team, Pinas never got more than a few chances as a substitute. Knowing that he would not really get more playtime, Pinas was loaned to SBV Excelsior in 1999. This time, Pinas soon became a key player. At the end of the season, teams as Twente and Willem II were interested in buying him, but then Pinas suffered a serious knee injury. Eventually, Pinas would stay at Excelsior for two more seasons, until Feyenoord would get him back in 2002. This situation would only last for a few months, because Pinas noticed that he was not getting the playtime he wanted, and he was again loaned to Excelsior.

In 2003, Pinas was transferred to FC Groningen where things all started well for him, until the team started playing with two attackers instead of three. When Pinas' chances of playing decreased, he was offered a trial by the Belgian team Cercle Brugge, who were desperately seeking for a left-footed winger. Pinas immediately convinced the management of the Belgian First division team and he was offered a contract. Cercle Brugge supporters were pleased with the skills of Pinas, but these solid performances were not constant enough. As a result, Pinas became rather uncertain of his place in the first team. In late August 2006, Pinas was sold to NAC Breda. He left Breda one year later and joined FC Dordrecht.
