= Jeroen Heubach =

Dutch footballer

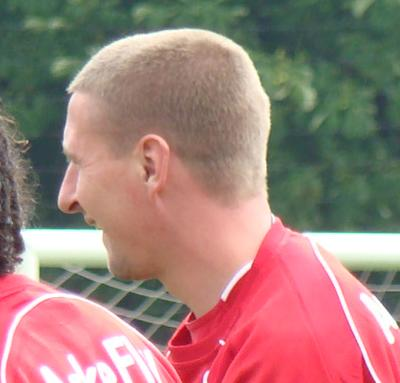

Personal information
- Date of birth: 24 September 1974 (age 52)
- Place of birth: Enschede, Netherlands
- Height: 1.77 m (5 ft 9 1/2 in)
- Position: Left back

Youth career
- Vosta
- Twente

Senior career*
Years	Team	Apps	(Gls)
1994–2010	Twente	272	(6)
1997–1999	→ MVV (loan)	56	(1)
2010	→ NEC (loan)	5	(0)
Total		333	(7)

International career
1992	Netherlands U18	3	(0)
1992–1993	Netherlands U19	7	(0)
- * Club domestic league appearances and goals

Jeroen Heubach (born 24 September 1974) is a Dutch retired footballer.

== Club career ==
Heubach made his first team debut on 11 December 1994 in a match against MVV. After three seasons in FC Twente's first squad, and merely playing a few league matches for the side, he was loaned out to the team he made his debut against, MVV from Maastricht. He was loaned out for two seasons from 1997 until 1999, and he became a solid left back for the club. Therefore, he returned to Twente. He picked up a winner's medal when Twente won the 2001 KNVB Cup after a penalty shoot-out

At Twente, he is praised by fans for his loyalty to the club, spanning over a decade.

In January 2010, Heubach was loaned out to NEC, who were in desperate need of a left back after loaning out Youssef El Akchaoui.

Heubach retired from professional football in summer 2010. Twente won the Eredivisie that season but Heubach did not make any league appearances in the campaign.

== International career ==
Heubach played 7 games for the Netherlands national under-19 football team.

== Post-playing career ==
After retiring as a player, Heubach coached in the FC Twente academy. He was fired in 2015 due to financial difficulties with the club and took up a job as a social worker in Enschede. He also became a coach and worked at childhood club Vosta.

== Honours ==
Twente

- KNVB Cup: 2000–01

== Background ==
- Twente supporters call him Heubach Hooligan because he showed his middle finger to supporters of Vitesse Arnhem and FC Utrecht. He is a fanatic supporter of his current club FC Twente.
