= Koen van de Laak =

Dutch footballer (born 1982)

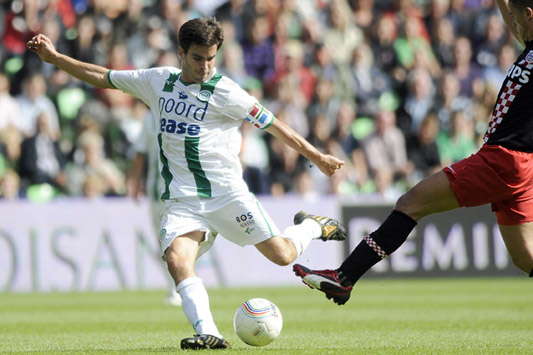
- Van de Laak with Groningen

Personal information
- Full name: Koen Marinus Adrianus van de Laak
- Date of birth: 3 September 1982 (age 44)
- Place of birth: Vught, Netherlands
- Height: 1.82 m (6 ft 0 in)
- Position: Midfielder

Youth career
- 1988–1994: Zwaluw VFC
- 1994–2000: Den Bosch

Senior career*
Years	Team	Apps	(Gls)
2000–2005	Den Bosch	142	(46)
2005–2012	Groningen	139	(24)
2012–2014	Ajax Cape Town	19	(0)
Total		290	(70)

International career
2000–2004	Netherlands U21	8	(0)
- * Club domestic league appearances and goals

Koen van de Laak (born 3 September 1982) is a Dutch former professional footballer. He played for Den Bosch, Groningen and Ajax Cape Town in South Africa.

== Career ==
=== Den Bosch ===
Born in Vught, Koen van de Laak started to play for a local club named Zwaluw VFC in 1988 when he was six years old. He moved to FC Den Bosch in 1994. After spending six years in the youth team, he made his debut in the first squad of Den Bosch on 4 November 2000. In this game he scored two times against Helmond Sport. That year his team promoted to the Eredivisie.

=== Groningen ===
After playing some good seasons at Den Bosch and being top scorer several times, he opted to move to another team. He had several clubs to choose from but Groningen signed him for four years. In the first year playing for Groningen they ended up fifth in the league and managed to qualify for the UEFA Cup for the 2006–07 season. He quickly adjusted at Groningen, soon becoming a very important player and a fan favourite under the tenure of Ron Jans.

In the 2009–10 season, he became the captain of the team. Groningen managed to qualify twice for the Europe League which was unique in the history of Groningen. In December 2010, he picked up a knee injury in a match against Vitesse which kept him off the pitch till January 2012; despite that, his club agreed to extend his contract by one more year (from June 2011 to June 2012).

On 29 March 2012, it was revealed Van de Laak would leave Groningen at the end of the season, once his contract expired.

=== Ajax Cape Town ===
On 15 June 2012, Van de Laak signed with Ajax Cape Town from South Africa, playing in the Premier Soccer League for two seasons before parting ways with the Cape club.

== Career statistics ==
Appearances and goals by club, season and competition
Club	Season	League			Cup		Europe		Other		Total		Ref.
Club	Season	Division	Apps	Goals	Apps	Goals	Apps	Goals	Apps	Goals	Apps	Goals	Ref.
Den Bosch	2000–01	Eerste Divisie	20	7							20	7	
Den Bosch	2001–02	Eredivisie	28	0							28	0	
Den Bosch	2002–03	Eerste Divisie	29	17							29	17	
Den Bosch	2003–04	Eerste Divisie	34	16							34	16	
Den Bosch	2004–05	Eredivisie	31	6							31	6	
Den Bosch	Total		142	46							142	46	–
Groningen	2005–06	Eredivisie	24	3					3	0	27	3	
Groningen	2006–07	Eredivisie	25	7			2	1	3	0	30	8	
Groningen	2007–08	Eredivisie	18	2	1	0	2	0			21	2	
Groningen	2008–09	Eredivisie	26	5	2	0			3	0	31	5	
Groningen	2009–10	Eredivisie	26	5	2	0			2	0	30	5	
Groningen	2010–11	Eredivisie	16	2	2	1					18	3	
Groningen	2011–12	Eredivisie	4	0							4	0	
Groningen	Total		139	24	7	1	4	1	11	0	161	26	–
Ajax Cape Town	2012–13	Premier Soccer League	13	0							13	0	
Ajax Cape Town	2013–14	Premier Soccer League	6	0	0	0					6	0	
Ajax Cape Town	Total		19	0							19	0	–
Career total			290	70	7	1	4	1	11	0	312	72	–

== Honours ==
Den Bosch

- Eerste Divisie: 2000–01, 2003–04
