= Edwin Zoetebier =

Dutch footballer (born 1970)

Personal information
- Full name: Eduard Andreas Dominicus Hendricus Jozef Zoetebier
- Date of birth: 7 May 1970 (age 56)
- Place of birth: Purmerend, Netherlands
- Height: 1.91 m (6 ft 3 in)
- Position: Goalkeeper

Youth career
- RKAV Volendam

Senior career*
Years	Team	Apps	(Gls)
1988–1997	Volendam	220	(0)
1997–1998	Sunderland	0	(0)
1998–2000	Feyenoord	1	(0)
2000–2001	Vitesse	37	(0)
2001–2004	Feyenoord	58	(0)
2004–2006	PSV	9	(0)
2006–2008	NAC Breda	33	(0)
Total		358	(0)
- * Club domestic league appearances and goals

Eduard Andreas Dominicus Hendricus Jozef "Edwin" Zoetebier (Dutch pronunciation: [ˈɛtʋɪn ˈzutəbiːr]; born 7 May 1970) is a Dutch former professional footballer who played as a goalkeeper.

== Career ==
Zoetebier was born in Purmerend, North Holland. He started his professional career in the 1988–89 season playing for FC Volendam. He later served Sunderland, Feyenoord, Vitesse Arnhem, PSV Eindhoven and NAC Breda. Zoetebier signed for Sunderland in the summer of 1997 as back up to Lionel Pérez. However, he left in January 1998 having made just two appearances for the club (both in the League Cup). His career highlight was being the starting goalkeeper for Feyenoord in the 2002 UEFA Cup final against Borussia Dortmund as the Dutch club won 3–2. He also played in the 2002 UEFA Super Cup against Real Madrid which saw the Spanish side prevail 2–1. He was also an unplayed member of the Feyenoord side which won the Eredivisie in 1998–99 and the Dutch Super Cup in 1999 as Jerzy Dudek was the team's first-choice goalkeeper.

He joined FC Volendam as goalkeeping coach in 2008.

== Honours ==
Feyenoord

- Eredivisie: 1998–99
- Johan Cruyff Shield: 1999
- UEFA Cup: 2001–02
