= Björn Daelemans =

Belgian footballer

Personal information
- Date of birth: 11 December 1977 (age 48)
- Place of birth: Ekeren, Belgium
- Height: 1.79 m (5 ft 10 in)
- Position: Forward

Senior career*
Years	Team	Apps	(Gls)
1995–1996	Germinal Ekeren		
1996–1997	Cappellen		
1997–2001	Verbroedering Geel	117	(38)
2001–2006	RBC Roosendaal	123	(12)
2005	→ Verbroedering Geel (loan)	13	(7)
2006–2008	Heracles Almelo	20	(0)
2008–2010	Verbroedering Geel-Meerhout		
- * Club domestic league appearances and goals

Björn Daelemans (born 11 December 1977) is a Belgian former footballer. He predominantly played as a forward, but later in his career he also appeared as right-back.

== Career ==
Daelemans was born in Ekeren and made his debut in professional football in the 1995–96 season when playing for Germinal Ekeren in the Belgian First Division A. The next season, he played for Cappellen F.C. in the Belgian Second Division.

He then moved to Verbroedering Geel from the same level, where he would play between 1997 and 2001. In the 1998–99 season, he helped them achieve promotion to the First Division A through play-offs, contributing 17 goals from 33 league appearances. After being relegated at the end of the following season, Daelemans played one more season for the club in the Second Division.

In the summer of 2001, he moved to the Netherlands, signing with Eerste Divisie club RBC Roosendaal. In his first season, he made 28 appearances (four goals) and saw the club promoted to the Eredivisie through play-offs. During his time with RBC, Daelemans appeared frequently, both as a starter and from the bench, except between January 2005 and June 2005, when he was loaned out to his old club Verbroedering Geel. At the end of the 2005–06 season, RBC were relegated from the Eredivisie and Daelemans was released from the club.

In May 2006, he signed for Heracles Almelo, where he was asked to play as right-back rather than as a forward. After two seasons, in which he made 20 Eredivisie appearances, he was released.

He ended his career with Verbroedering Geel-Meerhout in the Belgian Fourth Division, playing for them between 2008 and 2010.
