= Marnix Smit =

Dutch footballer

Personal information
- Date of birth: 10 December 1975 (age 50)
- Place of birth: Almelo, Netherlands
- Height: 1.86 m (6 ft 1 in)
- Position: Centre back

Youth career
- SV Rietvogels
- FC Twente

Senior career*
Years	Team	Apps	(Gls)
1999–2009	Heracles Almelo	231	(13)
- * Club domestic league appearances and goals

Marnix Smit (born 10 December 1975) is a Dutch former footballer who played as a centre back. He spent all of his professional career, which lasted ten years, with Heracles Almelo.

== Playing career ==
Smit was born in Almelo and played youth football for SV Rietvogels and FC Twente. In January 1999, while playing for the reserve team of FC Twente, he was approached by Eerste Divisie side Heracles Almelo, who were looking to give the club a more regional image with players who were from the area. Smit subsequently made his debut in professional football on 16 August 1999, in an away match against FC Eindhoven. During the 2004–05 season, he helped Heracles become Eerste Divisie champions. During the next season, they were able to stay in the Eredivisie comfortably (reaching 13th place), of which he said in 2014: "it felt like winning another championship". Smit subsequently played for three more seasons in the Eredivisie with Heracles, before leaving the club in the summer of 2009. He then moved to amateur side SVZW, where he played until 2012.

== Style of play ==
Smit was known as a player with good passing ability, and as a free kick specialist.

== Personal life ==
While playing professional football, Smit was a public administration student at the University of Twente. In 2010, he obtained a PhD degree in urban planning at the same university with a dissertation entitled "Safeguarding public interests in urban planning: A study on the impact of public-private partnerships on the public interest".

== Honours ==
Heracles Almelo

- Eerste Divisie: 2004–05
