= Kees van Wonderen =

Dutch footballer and manager (born 1969)

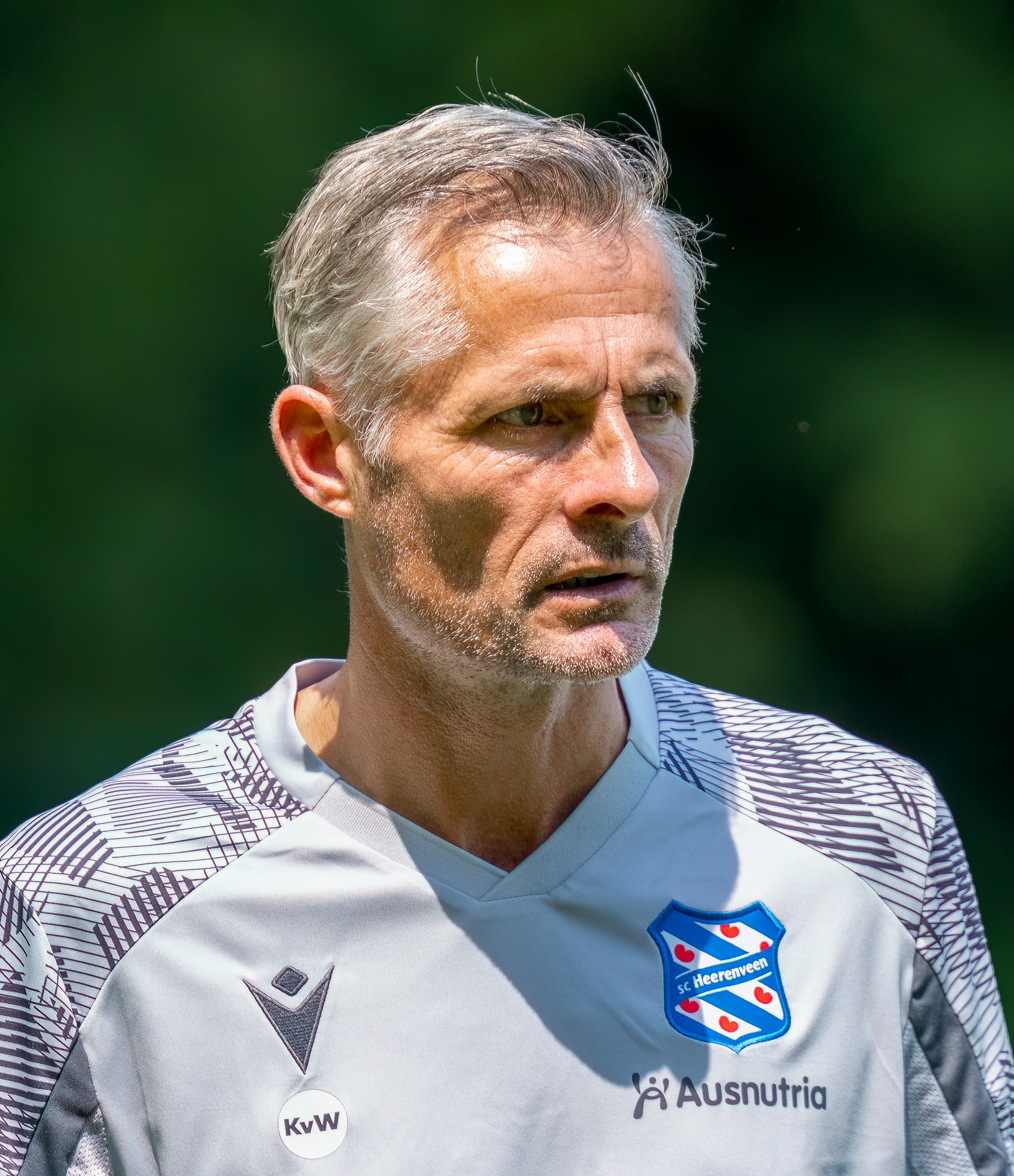
- van Wonderen as manager of Heerenveen in 2023

Personal information
- Full name: Cornelis Hendricus van Wonderen
- Date of birth: 4 January 1969 (age 57)
- Place of birth: Bergen, Netherlands
- Height: 1.87 m (6 ft 2 in)
- Position: Centre back

Youth career
- –1991: Bennekom

Senior career*
Years	Team	Apps	(Gls)
1991–1994	NEC	99	(26)
1994–1996	NAC	56	(6)
1996–2004	Feyenoord	203	(5)
Total		358	(37)

International career
1998–1999	Netherlands	5	(0)

Managerial career
- 2015–2017: Netherlands U18
- 2015–2018: Netherlands U17
- 2020–2022: Go Ahead Eagles
- 2022–2024: Heerenveen
- 2024–2025: Schalke 04
Medal record
Representing Netherlands
UEFA European Under-17 Championship
Winner	England 2018
- * Club domestic league appearances and goals

Cornelis "Kees" Hendricus van Wonderen (Dutch pronunciation: [ˈkeːs fɑɱ ˈʋɔndərə(n)]; born 4 January 1969) is a Dutch professional football manager and former player who last coached Schalke 04. During his playing career, he was mostly utilised as a centre back.

== Playing career ==
=== Club ===
Van Wonderen was born in Bergen, North Holland, and played professional football for NEC, NAC Breda and Feyenoord.

While at Feyenoord, Van Wonderen won the Eredivisie in 1999 and the 2001–02 UEFA Cup, as the club beat Borussia Dortmund 3–2 in the final at De Kuip.

=== International ===
He also won five caps for the Netherlands national team.

== Coaching career ==
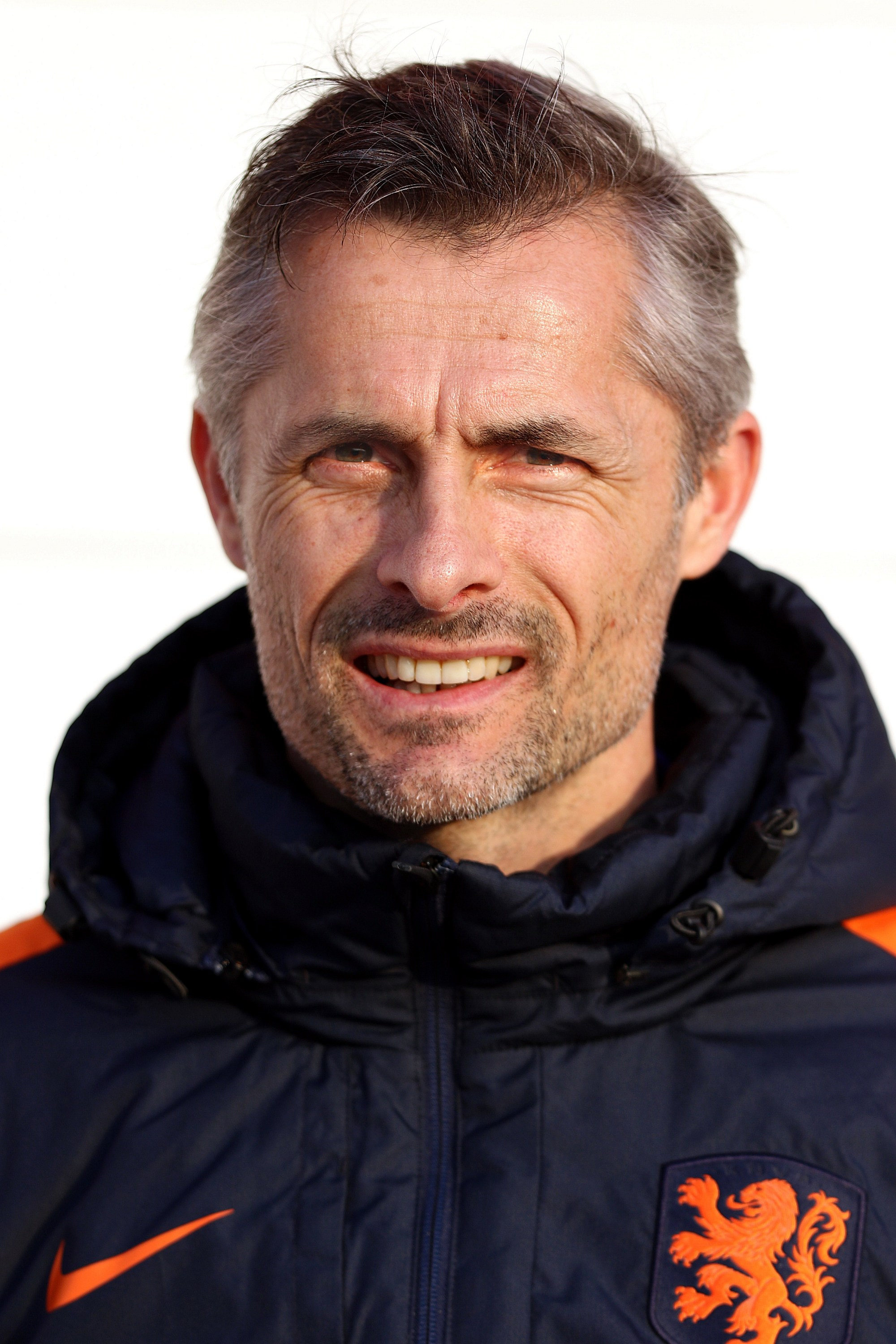
van Wonderen with the Netherlands U-18 in March 2017

After his career as a professional footballer, he started as a scout at Feyenoord but left the position again after a few months. He then became assistant coach to Camiel Jager at his youth club VV Bennekom in December 2006.

In the summer of 2008 he accepted an offer from Twente to join the technical staff there under manager Steve McClaren. After two years, McClaren left Twente in the summer 2010 and following that, van Wonderen indicated that he wanted to take a step back to spend more time with his family. However, he signed a new deal with Twente in August 2010 as an assistant manager.

In October 2011, he was also added to the backroom staff of Netherlands U-16 and U-18 national teams as an assistant manager beside his job at Twente. Meanwhile, Van Wonderen and FC Twente decided to separate on 6 July 2012. However, by the request of his former Twente-colleague Alfred Schreuder who had been appointed head coach of Twente, Van Wonderen returned to the club as an assistant manager at the end of February 2013.

In the summer 2015, Van Wonderen left Twente and was appointed manager of Netherlands U-17 and U-18 national teams. At the start of the 2017/18 season, Van Wonderen was added to the technical staff of VVV-Venlo as an intern.

In March 2018, he was appointed assistant manager to Ronald Koeman for Netherlands A-team. He left this position in December 2019.

On 29 February 2020, Go Ahead Eagles confirmed that Van Wonderen would become the club's new head coach for the upcoming season. The club finished 2nd in the end of the 2020-21 season, which meant promotion to the Eredivisie.

On 21 March 2022, Van Wonderen was appointed as the new head coach of Heerenveen at the start of the 2022–23 season. On 11 March 2024, it was announced that he would leave the club at the end of the season.

On 6 October 2024, Van Wonderen became head coach of German 2. Bundesliga club Schalke 04, signing a contract until summer 2026. On 23 April 2025, Schalke 04 announced that he would leave the club at the end of the season. He was sacked on 3 May 2025.

== Managerial statistics ==
As of 2 May 2025

Managerial record by team and tenure
Team	From	To	Record					Ref.
Team	From	To	G	W	D	L	Win %	Ref.
Go Ahead Eagles	1 July 2020	30 June 2022	80	39	14	27	48.75	
Heerenveen	1 July 2022	30 June 2024	76	26	17	33	34.21	
Schalke 04	6 October 2024	3 May 2025	25	8	6	11	32.00	
Total			181	73	37	71	40.33	

== Honours ==
=== Player ===
Feyenoord

- Eredivisie: 1998–99
- Johan Cruyff Shield: 1999
- UEFA Cup: 2001–02

=== Manager ===
Netherlands U17

- UEFA European Under-17 Championship: 2018

Go Ahead Eagles

- Promotion to the Eredivisie (2nd place)
