= Patrick Lodewijks =

Dutch footballer (born 1967)

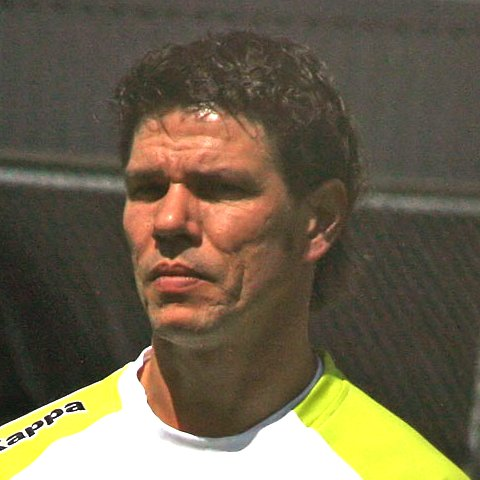
- Lodewijks in 2007

Personal information
- Date of birth: 21 February 1967 (age 59)
- Place of birth: Eindhoven, Netherlands
- Height: 1.85 m (6 ft 1 in)
- Position: Goalkeeper

Youth career
- WVVZ
- PSV

Senior career*
Years	Team	Apps	(Gls)
1987–1989	PSV	11	(0)
1989–1998	Groningen	270	(0)
1998–2002	PSV	19	(0)
2002–2007	Feyenoord	74	(0)
Total		374	(0)
- * Club domestic league appearances and goals

Patrick Lodewijks (Dutch pronunciation: [ˈpɛtrɪk ˈloːdəʋɛiks]; born 21 February 1967) is a Dutch former professional footballer who played as a goalkeeper, and is the goalkeeping coach of the Netherlands national team.

He played in 374 Eredivisie matches in a 20-year professional career, in representation of three clubs.

== Playing career ==
Born in Eindhoven, North Brabant, Lodewijks started his professional career with local PSV Eindhoven, but was never able to dislodge legendary Hans van Breukelen during his two-year spell. He made his Eredivisie debut on 23 April 1988 in a 2–0 away win against Groningen, and then played nine solid seasons at precisely that club, which never lost its top flight status.

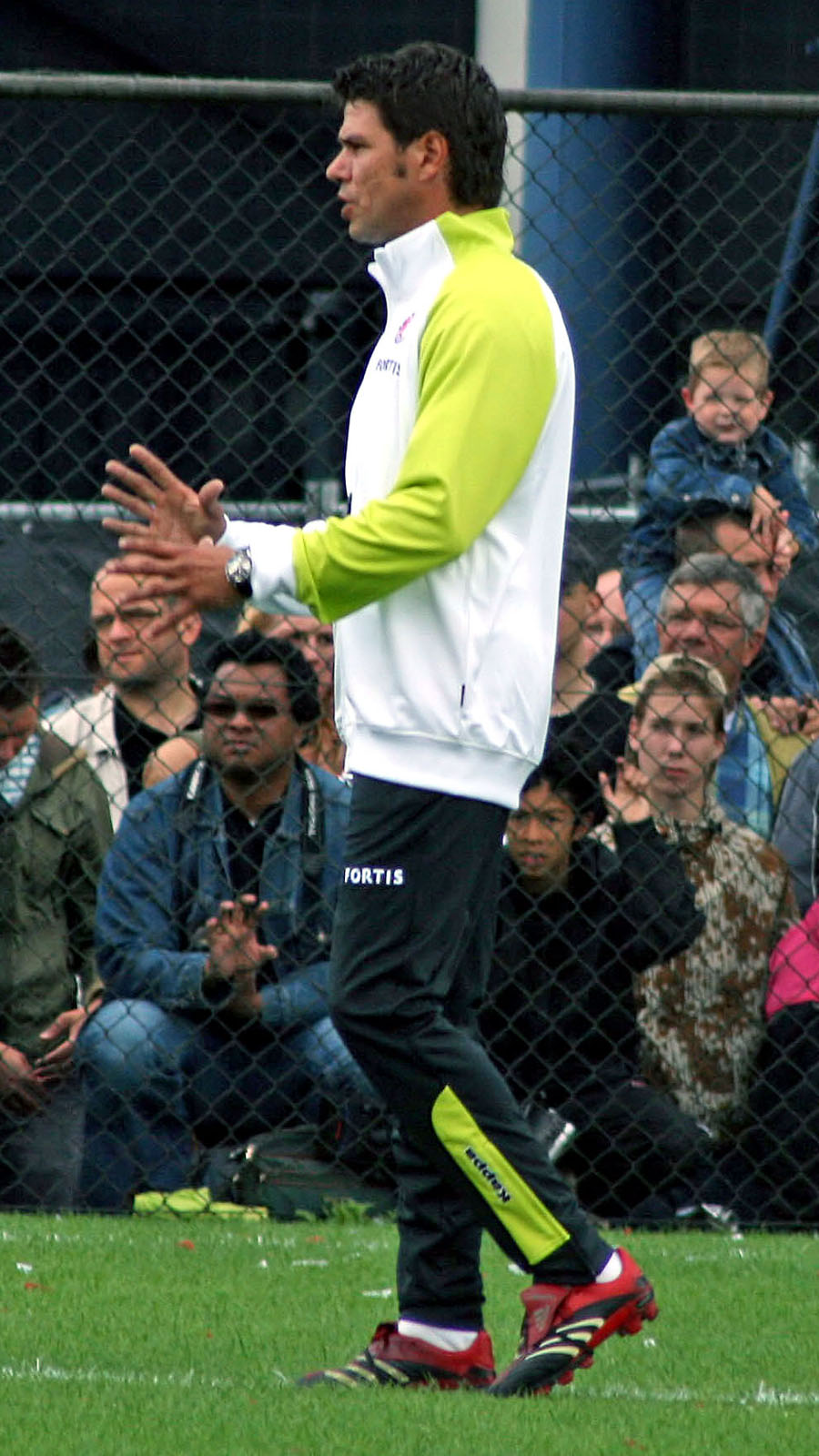
Lodewijks at Feyenoord practice

Lodewijks' performances earned him a PSV return, but he again would only play second-fiddle, now to Ronald Waterreus, appearing very rarely over four years. He signed in 2002 with Feyenoord, playing his first game on 3 November in another 2–0 success at Groningen. In his first seasons, he was a backup. In the 2004–05 season, however, he was selected over Gábor Babos and started the season as the first-choice goalkeeper. Eventually, he was referred back to the bench, but still made a few more appearances. The 2005–06 season was announced to be his last season as goalkeeper of Feyenoord, after which he would take over the job of goalkeeper coach at Feyenoord from Pim Doesburg. On 16 January 2006, however it was announced that Lodewijks would indeed serve as goalkeeper, making him the 38th oldest footballer in Eredivisie history at the age of 38. On 21 April 2006, Lodewijks was called up by Marco van Basten in the preliminary squad for the 2006 FIFA World Cup in Germany, but he did not advance to the final selection. The 2006–07 season was his last season as a professional goalkeeper. In the penultimate pre-season friendly of that season against English club Chelsea, he suffered an injury; as a result, he was no longer in action during the season.

== Coaching career ==
After the end of the 2006–07 season, and with the appointment of Bert van Marwijk as the new manager, Lodewijks finished his career at the age of 40, and replaced Pim Doesburg as goalkeeping coach of the Rotterdam side. This decision was advanced by a knee injury, which required surgery on the meniscus and left him on the sidelines for a long time.

Lodewijks continued working in that capacity in the following years, with former club Groningen and the Netherlands national team. In June 2016, he joined compatriot Ronald Koeman at Premier League's Everton.

In March 2018, he followed Koeman to the Netherlands national team, becoming the goalkeeper coach of Oranje for the second time in his coaching career.

== Honours ==
PSV

- Eredivisie: 1988–89, 1999–2000
