= Quincy van Ommeren =

Dutch footballer

Quincy van Ommeren (born 25 May 1974) is a Dutch footballer who played as a midfielder for Eerste Divisie league clubs FC Volendam during the 1998–2002 seasons and MVV Maastricht during the 2004–05 season.
