= Youssef El Akchaoui =

Moroccan footballer (born 1981)

Personal information
- Full name: Youssef El Akchaoui
- Date of birth: 18 February 1981 (age 45)
- Place of birth: Dordrecht, Netherlands
- Height: 1.74 m (5 ft 9 in)
- Position: Left back

Youth career
- Alblasserdam
- Feyenoord

Senior career*
Years	Team	Apps	(Gls)
2000–2002	Excelsior	39	(3)
2002–2003	Union Berlin	11	(0)
2003–2006	ADO Den Haag	83	(2)
2006–2010	NEC	106	(14)
2010	→ FC Augsburg (loan)	13	(0)
2010–2012	Heerenveen	16	(0)
2010–2011	→ VVV-Venlo (loan)	14	(0)
2012	→ NAC Breda (loan)	14	(0)
2013	Excelsior	13	(0)
2013–2014	Haaglandia	24	(0)
2014–2015	SV DRL		

International career
2008–2010	Morocco	2	(0)
- * Club domestic league appearances and goals

Youssef El Akchaoui (Arabic: يوسف العكشاوي; born 18 February 1981) is a Moroccan former professional footballer. He played as a left back.

== Club career ==
Having grown as a player at Excelsior, he joined ADO Den Haag in 2003 on a free transfer, and in the summer 2006, he signed a three-year deal with Eredivisie side NEC Nijmegen. On 20 January 2010, he was loaned to FC Augsburg for the remainder of the season.

== International career ==
He made his first cap for Morocco in the friendly match against Benin on 20 August 2008.
