= Mariano Bombarda =

Argentinian footballer

Personal information
- Date of birth: 10 September 1972 (age 54)
- Place of birth: Cádiz, Spain
- Position: Striker

Youth career
- 1989–1990: ACV
- 1990–1992: Huracán

Senior career*
Years	Team	Apps	(Gls)
1992–1994	ACV	?	(25)
1994–1996	Groningen	66	(32)
1996	Metz	7	(1)
1996–1998	Groningen	46	(13)
1998–2002	Willem II	108	(51)
2002–2004	Feyenoord	20	(4)
2004–2005	Tenerife	9	(1)
Total		250	(101)
- * Club domestic league appearances and goals

Mariano Bombarda (born 10 September 1972) is an Argentinian former professional footballer who played as a striker.

== Early life ==
Bombarda was born in Cádiz, Spain, to an Italian father and Argentinian mother. Due to the profession of his father, who was a naval engineer, his family moved a lot and in addition to Spain he has also lived in Italy, Argentina and Venezuela.

== Career ==
As part of an exchange program in 1989 for students from Venezuela, he played for ACV in Assen, Netherlands, where he entered the under-19 team. For two years after, Bombarda played in the youth team and sometimes in the reserve team of the Argentinian club Huracán, after which he returned to the Netherlands to play for ACV and study higher education.

After impressing in the first team of the amateur club, Bombarda was scouted by Groningen. He made his professional debut in the 1994–95 season for the club when he replaced Marcel Boudesteijn in the match against Heerenveen on 26 August 1994.

Bombarda then played for Metz, before returning to Groningen. Later on, he joined Willem II, where he scored a goal after just 28.21 seconds in a 4–3 defeat against Sparta Prague in the 1999–2000 UEFA Champions League.

Afterwards, he played for Feyenoord and Tenerife. At the latter, he retired from football after one season, in 2005.

== After football ==
Bombarda has since worked as a youth team coach at Willem II.
