= Carlo l'Ami =

Dutch footballer and coach (born 1966)

Personal information
- Full name: Carlo l'Ami
- Date of birth: 20 July 1966 (age 60)
- Place of birth: Leiden, Netherlands
- Height: 1.83 m (6 ft 0 in)
- Position: Goalkeeper

Team information
- Current team: Al Ain (Goalkeepers trainer)

Youth career
- Blauw-Zwart
- Excelsior

Senior career*
Years	Team	Apps	(Gls)
1987–1988	Excelsior	?	(0)
1988–1989	PSV	2	(0)
1989–1990	SVV	?	(0)
1990–1991	Dordrecht '90	?	(0)
1991–1992	Heracles Almelo	?	(0)
1992–1993	Sparta Rotterdam	1	(0)
1993–1996	Heerenveen	68	(0)
1996	SC Cambuur	?	(0)
1996–1998	Telstar	?	(0)
1998–2002	Excelsior	?	(0)
2002–2003	Feyenoord	3	(0)

Managerial career
- 2003–2004: Excelsior (keepers)
- 2004–2006: Feyenoord (keepers)
- 2006–2007: Excelsior (keepers)
- 2007–2020: Ajax (keepers)
- 2021: Al Wehda (keepers)
- 2022: Club Brugge (keepers)
- 2022–2023: Suriname (keepers)
- 2023–: Al Ain (keepers)
- * Club domestic league appearances and goals as of 26 May 2023 (UTC)

Carlo l'Ami (Dutch pronunciation: [ˈkɑrloː laːˈmi]; born 20 July 1966 in Leiden) is a Dutch football coach and former player who is currently the goalkeeping coach for UAE Pro League side Al Ain FC.

During his playing career, he played as a goalkeeper for various Dutch clubs, including Excelsior, PSV, Heracles Almelo, SC Heerenveen, SC Cambuur, Telstar and Feyenoord. Following his playing career he became the goalkeeping coach for Feyenoord, Excelsior and then Ajax.

== Club career ==
Carlo l'Ami began his playing career with local amateur side Blauw-Zwart in Wassenaar before being recruited to join the youth ranks of SBV Excelsior in Rotterdam. He then made his debut for Excelsior on 26 April 1987. Leaving the club two years later to join PSV Eindhoven, his stay with PSV would only last one season, before transferring once more, this time to SVV. After just one season in Schiedam, he joined Dordrecht '90 for one season, followed by a season with Heracles Almelo and another with Sparta Rotterdam. In 1993, he joined SC Heerenveen where he became the first choice keeper, remaining with the club for three seasons, before joining SC Cambuur on a six-month deal during the winter transfer window of his final season with Heerenveen. After his short stint with Cambuur, l'Ami joined SC Telstar for two seasons, returning to Rotterdam, where he returned to Excelsior for four seasons, and then subsequently playing for Feyenoord for one year, after which he retired.

== Coaching career ==
Following his retirement in 2003, l'Ami became the new goalkeeping coach for Feyenoord under then manager Erwin Koeman, who was later replaced by Ruud Gullit during the two-year period in which Carlo served his tenure. He then returned to SBV Excelsior once more as goalkeeping coach under manager Ton Lokhoff for one season, before joining AFC Ajax as goalkeeping coach in 2007, where he is presently active. He has since been greatly involved with the coaching and direction of Ajax keepers such as Maarten Stekelenburg, Kenneth Vermeer and Jasper Cillessen.

== Honours ==
=== Player ===
PSV

- Eredivisie: 1988–89
- KNVB Cup: 1988–89

=== Coach ===
Ajax

- Eredivisie (4): 2010–11, 2011–12, 2012–13, 2013–14
- KNVB Cup (1): 2009–10
- Johan Cruijff Shield (2): 2007, 2013

Club Brugge

- Belgian First Division A (1): 2021–22
