= Leonardo (footballer, born 1976) =

Brazilian footballer

Personal information
- Full name: Leonardo dos Santos Silva
- Date of birth: 21 August 1976 (age 50)
- Place of birth: Rio de Janeiro, Brazil
- Height: 1.76 m (5 ft 9 1/2 in)
- Position: Winger

Youth career
- Flamengo

Senior career*
Years	Team	Apps	(Gls)
1997–2001	Groningen	118	(7)
2001–2004	Feyenoord	11	(0)
2002	→ De Graafschap (loan)	14	(0)
2004	→ ADO Den Haag (loan)	23	(0)
2005	MVV	14	(2)
2006–2007	Dordrecht	10	(0)
2007	Lorca	?	(?)
2008	Deportes Quindío	?	(?)
2008	Nova Iguaçu	12	(0)
2009	Veranópolis	1	(0)
2009–2011	Emmen	19	(0)
- * Club domestic league appearances and goals

Leonardo dos Santos Silva (Brazilian Portuguese pronunciation: [le.oˈnaʁdu dus ˈsɐ̃tus ˈsiwvɐ]; born 21 August 1976) is a former Brazilian footballer who played as a winger. Leonardo's former clubs in the Netherlands include FC Groningen, Feyenoord Rotterdam, De Graafschap, ADO Den Haag, MVV, FC Dordrecht and FC Emmen. During his time at Feyenoord he was better known as Leonardo II (Dutch pronunciation: [leːjoːˈnɑrdoː də ˈtʋeːdə]) because Leonardo Santiago also played for the club at that time using the name Leonardo.

After retiring, he worked as administrative assistant to the Brazilian consulate in Rotterdam.

== Honours ==
Feyenoord

- UEFA Cup: 2002
