= Patrick van Diemen =

Dutch footballer (born 1972)

Personal information
- Full name: Patrick van Diemen
- Date of birth: 12 June 1972 (age 54)
- Place of birth: Woerden, Netherlands
- Height: 1.85 m (6 ft 1 in)
- Position: Defensive midfielder

Senior career*
Years	Team	Apps	(Gls)
1990–1993	Utrecht	35	(1)
1993–1994	AZ	21	(5)
1994–1996	N.E.C.	67	(7)
1996–1998	RKC	59	(11)
1998–2001	Anderlecht	82	(11)
2001–2008	RKC	192	(8)
2008–2010	Baronie		
Total		456	(43)
- * Club domestic league appearances and goals

Patrick van Diemen (born 12 June 1972 in Woerden, Netherlands) is a Dutch retired footballer who ended his professional career in 2008 after playing 19 seasons on the highest level.

== Club career ==
Van Diemen made his debut in professional football, being part of the FC Utrecht squad in the 1990–91 season. He also played for AZ, N.E.C., and had three seasons at Belgian giants Anderlecht before joining RKC Waalwijk for the second time in his career.

== Player agent ==
In April 2013 van Diemen received his player agents licence while working for the VVCS, the Dutch players association.

== Honours ==
Anderlecht

- Belgian First Division A: 1999–2000, 2000–01
- Belgian Super Cup: 2000
