= Patrick Pothuizen =

Dutch footballer and manager (born 1972)

Personal information
- Date of birth: 15 May 1972 (age 54)
- Place of birth: Culemborg, Netherlands
- Height: 1.86 m (6 ft 1 in)
- Position: Defender

Team information
- Current team: Astrantia SV (head coach)

Youth career
- Vriendenschaar
- Vitesse

Senior career*
Years	Team	Apps	(Gls)
1992–1994	Vitesse	10	(2)
1994	→ Dordrecht'90 (loan)	10	(2)
1994–2000	NEC	178	(14)
2000–2001	Vitesse	8	(1)
2001	→ Twente (loan)	12	(0)
2001–2004	Twente	88	(4)
2004–2010	NEC	102	(4)
2010–2012	De Treffers	47	(3)
2012–2014	DIO '30		

Managerial career
- 2016–2017: Jong NEC (assistant)
- 2017–2019: NEC (assistant)
- 2019–: Astrantia SV
- 2021–2024: Achilles '29
- * Club domestic league appearances and goals

Patrick Pothuizen (born 15 May 1972) is a Dutch football manager and former player who is the head coach of Vierde Klasse club Astrantia SV.

== Career ==
Pothuizen was a defender who was born in Culemborg and made his debut in professional football, being part of the Vitesse Arnhem squad in the 1992–93 season. He also played for Dordrecht'90 and FC Twente before joining NEC Nijmegen for the second time in his career.

To date, Pothuizen owns the record of having had most yellow cards as an Eredivisie Player. His final yellow card, his 84th, is also his most notorious yellow card as critics in media claimed that it should have been a red card. In the incident Pothuizen controversially put his hand to the ball which prevented Luis Suárez from a goalscoring opportunity. After he received the yellow card, Pothuizen pulled his football shirt up in order to show the crowd his white shirt with yellow text marking saying "84", referring to his yellow card record.

After the 2009-10 season, Pothuizen ended his professional career, and joined amateur side, De Treffers.

== Coaching career ==
In the summer 2012, Pothuizen joined DIO '30 where he was going to be a youth coach and he was also registered as a player. In addition, he would also start his own football school. On 13 June 2014 NEC announced, that Pothuizen had joined the team as a team manager for the first team. He would still continue as a youth coach at DIO '30.

Pothuizen became the assistant manager of Jong NEC for the 2016/17 season with Ron de Groot as manager. In April 2017, the duo was promoted to the first team, still with de Groot as manager and Pothuizen as his assistant. NEC announced on 2 April 2019, that he had left the club.

On 2 May 2019, he was appointed as manager of Astrantia SV for the upcoming season.

Pothuizen was appointed as head coach of Hoofdklasse club Achilles '29 in October 2021, while continuing managing Astrantia SV. He left Achilles '29 at the end of the 2023–24 season.

== Honours ==
Twente

- KNVB Cup: 2000–01
