= 2001–02 Feyenoord season =

Feyenoord
2001–02 season
- Manager: (Netherlands) Bert van Marwijk
- Eredivisie: 3rd
- KNVB Cup: Quarter-final
- Champions League: Group stage
- UEFA Cup: Winners
- Top goalscorer: League: Pierre van Hooijdonk (24); All: Pierre van Hooijdonk (33)

During the 2001–02 season, Feyenoord participated in the Eredivisie, the highest-ranking league in Dutch football. They also played in the KNVB Cup, UEFA Champions League, and the UEFA Cup. They were crowned champions of the 2002 UEFA Cup after beating Borussia Dortmund (Germany) in the final.

== Season summary ==
Feyenoord exited the Champions League at the group stage and were relegated to the UEFA Cup after finishing third in Group H. In the continental competition, Feyenoord defeated Freiburg, Rangers, PSV, and Inter Milan to reach the final, held at Feyenoord's home ground, Stadion Feijenoord, where they defeated Borussia Dortmund to win their second-ever UEFA Cup.

== First-team squad ==
Note: Flags indicate national team as defined under FIFA eligibility rules; some limited exceptions apply. Players may hold more than one non-FIFA nationality.

No.	Pos.	Nation	Player
1	GK	NED	Edwin Zoetebier
2	DF	GHA	Christian Gyan
3	DF	POL	Tomasz Rząsa
4	MF	CHI	Mauricio Aros
6	MF	NED	Paul Bosvelt
7	MF	CIV	Bonaventure Kalou
8	DF	NED	Kees van Wonderen
9	FW	NED	Pierre van Hooijdonk
10	FW	DEN	Jon Dahl Tomasson
11	FW	BRA	Leonardo
14	MF	JPN	Shinji Ono
15	FW	SWE	Johan Elmander
16	FW	POL	Ebi Smolarek
17	DF	NED	Patrick Paauwe

No.	Pos.	Nation	Player
18	MF	RUS	Igor Korneev
19	MF	NED	Jan de Visser
20	MF	NED	Ferry de Haan
22	DF	NED	Ulrich van Gobbel
23	MF	AUS	Brett Emerton
24	MF	BRA	Leonardo II
25	DF	NED	Ramon van Haaren
26	DF	BEL	Pieter Collen
27	DF	NED	Glenn Loovens
28	DF	CUW	Civard Sprockel
29	MF	NED	Saïd Boutahar
30	GK	NED	Henk Timmer (on loan from AZ)
31	GK	NED	Carlo l'Ami
32	FW	NED	Robin van Persie

== Transfers ==
=== In ===
- (Netherlands) Edwin Zoetebier - (Netherlands) Vitesse
- (Netherlands) Henk Timmer - (Netherlands) AZ, loan
- Mauricio Aros - Universidad de Chile
- (Brazil) Leonardo dos Santos - (Netherlands) Groningen
- (Japan) Shinji Ono - (Japan) Urawa Red Diamonds
- (Netherlands) Ramon van Haaren - (Netherlands) Roda JC
- (Belgium) Pieter Collen - (Netherlands) N.E.C.

== Results ==
=== Eredivisie ===
12 August 2001 1	Feyenoord	5 – 0	Sparta Rotterdam	Rotterdam
14:30 CET	Tomasson 11', 87', 90'; Emerton 23'; Bosvelt 55'	Report		Stadium: Stadion Feijenoord; Attendance: 43.396; Referee: Bossen

19 August 2001 2	Roda JC	0 – 2	Feyenoord	Kerkrade
19:00 CET	Vrede (yellow card) 84'; Anastasiou (yellow card) 86'	Report	27', 87' van Hooijdonk; (yellow card) 35' Smolarek; (yellow card) 37' Paauwe	Stadium: Parkstad Limburg Stadion; Attendance: 12.000; Referee: van Dijk

26 August 2001 3	Feyenoord	1 – 2	Ajax	Rotterdam
13:00 CET	Tomasson (yellow card) 87' (goal) 90'	Report	64' Ibrahimović; (yellow card) 69' (yellow-red card) Trabelsi; 82' van der Vaart; (yellow card) 88' Heitinga	Stadium: Stadion Feijenoord; Attendance: 42.000; Referee: Temmink

2 September 2001 4	NEC	0 – 3	Feyenoord	Nijmegen
20:00 CET	Zonneveld (yellow card) 63'	Report	22' Kalou; 48', 90' Tomasson; (yellow card) 48' Bosvelt	Stadium: De Goffert; Attendance: 12.300; Referee: Jol

15 September 2001 5	Feyenoord	2 – 0	De Graafschap	Rotterdam
20:00 CET	van Gobbel (yellow card) 2'; Tomasson 34' van Hooijdonk 45'	Report	(yellow card) 86' van Vossen	Stadium: Stadion Feijenoord; Attendance: 38.000; Referee: Luinge

22 September 2001 6	Twente	3 – 2	Feyenoord	Enschede
20:00 CET	Booth 34'; Pothuizen 89' de Gier 90'	Report	59' van Hooijdonk; 48' (Own goal) Pothuizen; (yellow card) 90' Leonardo II	Stadium: Arke Stadion; Attendance: 13.500; Referee: van Hulten

29 September 2001 7	Den Bosch	0 – 0	Feyenoord	Den Bosch
14:30 CET	Mghizrat (yellow card) 11'	Report		Stadium: De Vliert; Attendance: 5.897; Referee: Haverkort

6 October 2001 8	Feyenoord	1 – 0	Fortuna Sittard	Rotterdam
20:00 CET	Tomasson 68'	Report	(yellow card) 77' van der Hoeven	Stadium: Stadion Feijenoord; Attendance: 32.000; Referee: Oskam

20 October 2001 9	Feyenoord	1 – 0	Groningen	Rotterdam
14:30 CET	Ono 54'; Bosvelt (yellow card) 61'	Report	(yellow card) 32' Broerse	Stadium: Stadion Feijenoord; Attendance: 41.000; Referee: van Dijk

27 October 2001 10	AZ	1 – 3	Feyenoord	Alkmaar
20:00 CET	Elkhattabi 13'; Wijker (yellow card) 36'	Report	3' van Hooijdonk; 8' Paauwe; 17' Emerton	Stadium: Alkmaarderhout; Attendance: 7.783; Referee: van der Ende

3 November 2001 11	Feyenoord	4 – 0	Utrecht	Rotterdam
14:30 CET	van Hooijdonk 38', 78', 89'; Elmander 68'	Report	(yellow card) 36' Roest; (yellow card) 78' Vreven	Stadium: Stadion Feijenoord; Attendance: 40.000; Referee: Temmink

11 November 2001 12	NAC	2 – 1	Feyenoord	Breda
14:30 CET	Cristiano 5' (yellow card) 53'; Sergio 24'; Peto (yellow card) 88'	Report	51' (yellow card) 88' Tomasson	Stadium: Rat Verlegh Stadion; Attendance: 15.134; Referee: Luinge

17 November 2001 13	Feyenoord	3 – 2	Vitesse	Rotterdam
19:30 CET	van Hooijdonk 25'; Tomasson 39', 51'; Sprockel (yellow card) 67'	Report	26' van Beukering; (yellow card) 31' Kreek; 54' Sikora; (yellow card) 82' Nanu	Stadium: Stadion Feijenoord; Attendance: 40.500; Referee: Jol

24 November 2001 14	Feyenoord	3 – 1	Willem II	Rotterdam
14:30 CET	van Hooijdonk 43', 67', 75'	Report	(yellow card) 42' Mathijsen; (yellow card) 49' Jaliens; 57' Landzaat; (yellow card) 62' van Nieuwstadt; (yellow card) 86' Meriana	Stadium: Stadion Feijenoord; Attendance: 39.700; Referee: Wegereef

1 December 2001 15	RKC Waalwijk	2 – 3	Feyenoord	Waalwijk
20:00 CET	van Wanrooy (yellow card) 32'; Hoogendorp 53' (pen.), 62'; Petrovic (yellow card) 89'	Report	(yellow card) 3' (goal) 34', 75' Smolarek; 43' Bosvelt	Stadium: Mandemakers Stadion; Attendance: 6.400; Referee: Bossen

5 December 2001 16	Heerenveen	1 – 0	Feyenoord	Heerenveen
19:30 CET	Lurling 64' (pen.)	Report	(yellow card) 63' van Wonderen	Stadium: Abe Lenstra Stadion; Attendance: 14.500; Referee: Braamhaar

8 December 2001 17	Feyenoord	5 – 0	NEC	Rotterdam
14:30 CET	Tomasson 39' van Hooijdonk 44', 51' (pen.); Bosvelt 56'; Korneev 84'	Report	(yellow card) 51' Koning; (yellow card) 85' (yellow-red card) Hesp	Stadium: Stadion Feijenoord; Attendance: 38.000; Referee: van Dijk

16 December 2001 18	Feyenoord	0 – 0	PSV Eindhoven	Rotterdam
14:30 CET	van Hooijdonk (yellow card) 63'	Report	(yellow card) 63' Lucius	Stadium: Stadion Feijenoord; Attendance: 43.000; Referee: Luinge

23 December 2001 19	De Graafschap	1 – 0	Feyenoord	Doetinchem
20:00 CET	Valeyev 66'	Report	(yellow card) 37' Rząsa; (red card) 82' van Hooijdonk	Stadium: De Vijverberg; Attendance: 11.000; Referee: Temmink

27 January 2002 20	Utrecht	2 – 2	Feyenoord	Utrecht
13:00 CET	van den Bergh 4'; Roest (yellow card) 7'; Tanghe 36'; Zwaanswijk (yellow card) 38'; Roiha (yellow card) 83'	Report	2' Tomasson; (yellow card) 17' de Haan; (yellow card) 30' Paauwe; 62' van Hooijdonk	Stadium: Stadion Galgenwaard; Attendance: 13.500; Referee: Wegereef

3 February 2002 21	Feyenoord	5 – 0	Roda JC	Rotterdam
14:30 CET	Emerton 2', 51' van Hooijdonk 4' (pen.), 64'; Tomasson 70'	Report	(yellow card) 4' Vandenbroeck; (yellow card) 48' Soetaers	Stadium: Stadion Feijenoord; Attendance: 37.000; Referee: van Hulten

10 February 2002 22	Groningen	0 – 1	Feyenoord	Groningen
13:00 CET	Boussaboun (yellow card) 64'; Hoogstrate (yellow card) 69'	Report	45' (yellow card) 86' Tomasson; (yellow card) 70' Ono; (yellow card) 72' Rząsa	Stadium: Oosterpark Stadion; Attendance: 12.500; Referee: van Dijk

17 February 2002 23	Vitesse	2 – 1	Feyenoord	Arnhem
13:00 CET	Stefanović 30'; Mbamba 52'	Report	26' Ono	Stadium: GelreDome; Attendance: 27.000; Referee: Luinge

24 February 2002 24	Feyenoord	1 – 2	Twente	Rotterdam
14:30 CET	Emerton 49'; Rząsa (yellow card) 51'; Leonardo II (yellow card) 80'	Report	27', 46' Cziommer; (yellow card) 59' Booth; (yellow card) 62' van der Doelen	Stadium: Stadion Feijenoord; Attendance: 39.000; Referee: Haverkort

3 March 2002 25	Ajax	1 – 1	Feyenoord	Amsterdam
13:00 CET	Trabelsi (yellow card) 28'; Chivu (yellow card) 48'; Bergdølmo (yellow card) 74' (goal) 85' (pen.)	Report	(yellow card) 21' Ono; (yellow card) 24' Rząsa; 79' Leonardo	Stadium: Amsterdam ArenA; Attendance: 45.757; Referee: Jol

10 March 2002 26	Feyenoord	4 – 1	AZ	Rotterdam
14:30 CET	van Hooijdonk 17', 57'; Ono 31'; Tomasson 39'; Bosvelt (yellow card) 56'	Report	(yellow card) 21' Perez; (yellow card) 21' Huisman; (yellow card) 45' Lee; 63' Ketting	Stadium: Stadion Feijenoord; Attendance: 42.000; Referee: Braamhaar

17 March 2002 27	Feyenoord	3 – 0	Den Bosch	Rotterdam
14:30 CET	van Hooijdonk (yellow card) 16' (goal) 67', 90' (pen.); Kalou 82'	Report	(yellow card) 24' Van Den Eede	Stadium: Stadion Feijenoord; Attendance: 37.500; Referee: van Egmond

24 March 2002 28	Sparta Rotterdam	0 – 5	Feyenoord	Rotterdam
14:30 CET	De fauw (yellow card) 10'	Report	6' Emerton; 15' Tomasson; 45' van Hooijdonk; 49' Leonardo; 63' Bosvelt; (yellow card) 86' Smolarek	Stadium: Het Kasteel; Attendance: 10.570; Referee: Bossen

31 March 2002 29	Feyenoord	1 – 1	RKC Waalwijk	Rotterdam
14:30 CET	van Hooijdonk 82'	Report	48' Fuchs; (yellow card) 53' Lamey; (yellow card) 71' Putter	Stadium: Stadion Feijenoord; Attendance: 42.000; Referee: van Dijk

7 April 2002 30	Feyenoord	0 – 0	NAC	Rotterdam
14:30 CET	van Persie (yellow card) 29' van Wonderen (yellow card) 73'	Report	(yellow card) 8' Bobson; (yellow card) 71' Penders; (yellow card) 85' Engelaar	Stadium: Stadion Feijenoord; Attendance: 38.250; Referee: van Hulten

14 April 2002 31	PSV Eindhoven	2 – 0	Feyenoord	Eindhoven
13:00 CET	Nikiforov (yellow card) 16'; Kežman (yellow card) 38' (goal) 45', 69'; Ooijer (yellow card) 70'; Lucius (yellow card) 90'	Report	(yellow card) 39' Bosvelt; (yellow card) 69' Paauwe	Stadium: Philips Stadion; Attendance: 31.500; Referee: Wegereef

19 April 2002 32	Fortuna Sittard	1 – 2	Feyenoord	Sittard
20:00 CET	Hamming 40'; Dirkx (yellow card) 80' (yellow-red card)	Report	23' van Hooijdonk; (yellow card) 57' Tomasson; 63' Paauwe	Stadium: Wagner & Partners Stadion; Attendance: 12.000; Referee: Luinge

28 April 2002 33	Feyenoord	3 – 2	Heerenveen	Rotterdam
13:00 CET	Bosvelt 27', 59', 64'; Ono (yellow card) 39' (yellow-red card)	Report	28' Allbäck; (yellow card) 35' de Nooijer; (yellow card) 46' (goal) 48' Lurling; (yellow card) 51' Väyrynen; (yellow card) 70' Denneboom	Stadium: Stadion Feijenoord; Attendance: 45.000; Referee: Haverkort

5 May 2002 34	Willem II	0 – 0	Feyenoord	Tilburg
13:00 CET		Report		Stadium: Koning Willem II Stadion; Attendance: 14.400; Referee: van Dijk

=== UEFA Champions League ===
==== Group stage ====
18 September 2001	Spartak Moscow (Russia)	2–2	(Netherlands) Feyenoord	Luzhniki Stadium, Moscow
18:00	Robson 62'; Beschastnykh 69'	Report	Bosvelt 12'; Tomasson 59'	Referee: Antonio Jesús López Nieto (Spain)

25 September 2001	Sparta Prague (Czech Republic)	4–0	(Netherlands) Feyenoord	AXA Arena, Prague
20:45	Hartig 24'; Labant 38' (pen.); Kincl 71'; Michalík 74'	Report		Referee: Fritz Stuchlik (Austria)

3 October 2001	Feyenoord (Netherlands)	2–2	(Germany) Bayern Munich	Stadion Feijenoord, Rotterdam
20:45	Van Hooijdonk 38'; Tomasson 45+1'	Report	Élber 13', 50'	Referee: Gilles Veissière (France)

24 October 2001	Feyenoord (Netherlands)	0–2	(Czech Republic) Sparta Prague	Stadion Feijenoord, Rotterdam
20:45		Report	Jarošík 43'; Novotný 78'	Referee: Arturo Dauden Ibañez (Spain)

30 October 2001	Bayern Munich (Germany)	3–1	(Netherlands) Feyenoord	Olympic Stadium, Munich
20:45	Van Gobbel 12' (o.g.); Santa Cruz 30', 90+1'	Report	Elmander 25'	Referee: Lucílio Batista (Portugal)

7 November 2001	Feyenoord (Netherlands)	2–1	(Russia) Spartak Moscow	Stadion Feijenoord, Rotterdam
20:45	Tomasson 5'; Elmander 18'	Report	Beschastnykh 14'	Referee: Graziano Cesari (Italy)

=== UEFA Cup ===
==== Third round ====
29 November 2001	Feyenoord (Netherlands)	1–0	(Germany) Freiburg	Stadion Feijenoord, Rotterdam
	Ono 82'

13 December 2001	Freiburg (Germany)	2–2 (2–3 agg.)	(Netherlands) Feyenoord	Freiburg
	Kehl 21'; Kobiashvili 49' (pen.)		Van Hooijdonk 57'; Leonardo 86'

==== Fourth round ====
21 February 2002	Rangers (Scotland)	1–1	(Netherlands) Feyenoord	Ibrox Stadium, Glasgow
	Ferguson 81' (pen.)		Ono 72'

28 February 2002	Feyenoord (Netherlands)	3–2 (4–3 agg.)	(Scotland) Rangers	Stadion Feijenoord, Rotterdam
	Van Hooijdonk 37', 44'; Kalou 47'		McCann 26'; Ferguson 55' (pen.)

==== Quarter-final ====
7 March 2002	PSV Eindhoven (Netherlands)	1–1	(Netherlands) Feyenoord	Philips Stadion, Eindhoven
20:15	Kežman 47'	Report	Van Hooijdonk 45'	Attendance: 31,000; Referee: Pierluigi Collina (Italy)

14 March 2002	Feyenoord (Netherlands)	1–1 (a.e.t.) (5–4 p)	(Netherlands) PSV Eindhoven	Stadion Feijenoord, Rotterdam
20:15	Van Hooijdonk 90+3'	Report	Van Bommel 75'	Attendance: 43,000; Referee: Graham Barber (England)
	Penalties
	Ono (penalty scored); Paauwe (penalty scored); Van Wonderen (penalty scored); Bosvelt (penalty scored); Van Hooijdonk (penalty scored)		(penalty scored) Bruggink; (penalty scored) Ooijer; (penalty missed) Gakhokidze; (penalty scored) Heintze; (penalty scored) Kežman

==== Semi-final ====
4 April 2002	Internazionale (Italy)	0–1	(Netherlands) Feyenoord	San Siro, Milan
21:00		Report	Córdoba 51' (o.g.)	Attendance: 39,622; Referee: Ľuboš Micheľ (Slovakia)

11 April 2002	Feyenoord (Netherlands)	2–2 (3–2 agg.)	(Italy) Internazionale	Stadion Feijenoord, Rotterdam
20:30	Van Hooijdonk 17'; Tomasson 34'	Report	C. Zanetti 83'; Kallon 89' (pen.)	Attendance: 49,904; Referee: Antonio Jesús López Nieto (Spain)

==== Final ====
8 May 2002	Feyenoord (Netherlands)	3–2	(Germany) Borussia Dortmund	Stadion Feijenoord, Rotterdam
20:45 CEST	Van Hooijdonk 33' (pen.), 40'; Tomasson 50'	Report	Amoroso 47' (pen.); Koller 58'	Attendance: 48,500; Referee: Vítor Melo Pereira (Portugal)

== Top scorers ==
=== UEFA Cup ===
- Pierre van Hooijdonk - 8 goals
