= 2002 UEFA Cup final =

- Match programme cover
- Event: 2001–02 UEFA Cup
Feyenoord	Borussia Dortmund
(Netherlands)	(Germany)
3	2
- Date: 8 May 2002
- Venue: Feijenoord Stadion, Rotterdam
- Man of the Match: Jon Dahl Tomasson (Feyenoord)
- Referee: Vítor Melo Pereira (Portugal)
- Attendance: 45,611

The 2002 UEFA Cup final was an association football match played on 8 May 2002, between Feyenoord of the Netherlands and Borussia Dortmund of Germany at the Feijenoord Stadion in Rotterdam, Feyenoord's home ground. It was the 31st UEFA Cup final and it was also the first time that the final had been played at a finalist's home ground since the introduction of single-legged finals in the UEFA Cup in 1998.

Prior to this match, Feyenoord had not won a European trophy since 1974, when they beat Tottenham Hotspur to win the UEFA Cup final four years after winning the European Cup. Dortmund, who had already won the Bundesliga title, were hoping to become the second German club, as well as the fourth club overall, to have won all three pre-1999 major European trophies (European Cup/Champions League, UEFA Cup/Europa League and the now-defunct Cup Winners' Cup), having won the 1965–66 European Cup Winners' Cup and the 1996–97 UEFA Champions League.

Feyenoord won the match 3–2, marking the first European triumph for a Dutch club in seven years, after Ajax won the UEFA Champions League in 1995. As of 2025, this was the most recent European final won by a Dutch club.

== Background ==
Feyenoord and Borussia Dortmund had the two highest scorers in the competition that season in Pierre van Hooijdonk, who finished top of the scoring charts with eight goals, and Márcio Amoroso, who scored five goals overall. Both players added to their tallies during this match with Van Hooijdonk scoring two goals and Amoroso scoring one goal.

The match was the last for Borussia Dortmund veteran Jürgen Kohler, who was retiring after this match, however, the match did not go as intended as he was sent off after 31 minutes. The sides had met twice before in European competition, drawing on both occasions in the 1999–2000 UEFA Champions League. Borussia Dortmund were also boosted before kick-off by the news that Stefan Reuter had passed a late fitness test on his injured back.

== Route to the final ==
Both Feyenoord and Borussia Dortmund started off their European campaigns in the 2001–02 Champions League and entered the 2001–02 UEFA Cup in the third round, after finishing third in their respective Champions League groups.

(Netherlands) Feyenoord				Round	(Germany) Borussia Dortmund			
Champions League
Bye				Qualifying phase	Opponent	Agg.	1st leg	2nd leg
Bye				Third qualifying round	(Ukraine) Shakhtar Donetsk	5–1	2–0 (A)	3–1 (H)
Opponent	Result			First group stage	Opponent	Result		
(Russia) Spartak Moscow	2–2 (A)			Matchday 1	(Ukraine) Dynamo Kyiv	2–2 (A)		
(Czech Republic) Sparta Prague	0–4 (A)			Matchday 2	(England) Liverpool	0–0 (H)		
(Germany) Bayern Munich	2–2 (H)			Matchday 3	(Portugal) Boavista	1–2 (A)		
(Czech Republic) Sparta Prague	0–2 (H)			Matchday 4	(Portugal) Boavista	2–1 (H)		
(Germany) Bayern Munich	1–3 (A)			Matchday 5	(Ukraine) Dynamo Kyiv	1–0 (H)		
(Russia) Spartak Moscow	2–1 (H)			Matchday 6	(England) Liverpool	0–2 (A)		
Group H third place: Pos / Team / Pld / Pts; 1 / (Germany) Bayern Munich / 6 / 14; 2 / (Czech Republic) Sparta Prague / 6 / 11; 3 / (Netherlands) Feyenoord / 6 / 5; 4 / (Russia) Spartak Moscow / 6 / 2; Source: RSSSF				Final standings	Group B third place: Pos / Team / Pld / Pts; 1 / (England) Liverpool / 6 / 12; 2 / (Portugal) Boavista / 6 / 8; 3 / (Germany) Borussia Dortmund / 6 / 8; 4 / (Ukraine) Dynamo Kyiv / 6 / 4; Source: RSSSF			
UEFA Cup
Opponent	Agg.	1st leg	2nd leg		Opponent	Agg.	1st leg	2nd leg
(Germany) SC Freiburg	3–2	1–0 (H)	2–2 (A)	Third round	(Denmark) Copenhagen	2–0	1–0 (A)	1–0 (H)
(Scotland) Rangers	4–3	1–1 (A)	3–2 (H)	Fourth round	(France) Lille	1–1 (a)	1–1 (A)	0–0 (H)
(Netherlands) PSV Eindhoven	2–2 (p)	1–1 (A)	1–1 (a.e.t.) (H)	Quarter-finals	(Czech Republic) Slovan Liberec	4–0	0–0 (A)	4–0 (H)
(Italy) Internazionale	3–2	1–0 (A)	2–2 (H)	Semi-finals	(Italy) Milan	5–3	4–0 (H)	1–3 (A)

=== Borussia Dortmund ===
Dortmund started off their campaign in the third qualifying of the Champions League round defeating Shakhtar Donetsk 5–1 over two legs. BVB needed to win their last group game against Liverpool to have any chance of making it to the second group stage, but they lost 2–0 and were eliminated from Group B on goal difference, after finishing on the same points as Boavista.

Dortmund were drawn against Copenhagen of Denmark in the third round and won the first leg 1–0 away from home with Heiko Herrlich scoring in injury time. The second leg produced the same result, this time, Jan-Derek Sørensen scored in the 89th minute to secure Dortmund a place in the fourth round. In the fourth round, Dortmund were drawn against Lille of France, who had also joined the UEFA Cup, after finishing third in their Champions League group. Dortmund played the first leg away from home and got an away goal, after a 1–1 draw. Dortmund had opened the scoring in the 67th minute when Ewerthon scored after a rebound, though the lead only lasted five minutes as Salaheddine Bassir scored a half-volley on 72 minutes to tie the game 1–1, going into the second leg in Dortmund. In a rain-soaked second leg at the Westfalenstadion, the match finished in a 0–0 draw, meaning Borussia went through to the quarter-finals on the away goals rule.

Dortmund were drawn against Slovan Liberec of the Czech Republic in the quarter-finals, the first leg was drawn 0–0 draw in Prague. The draw was significant because it was the first time in the competition, that Liberec had failed to win at home. Dortmund won the second leg 4–0, after goals from Márcio Amoroso on 51 minutes, Jan Koller on 57 minutes, Lars Ricken on 70 minutes, and finally Ewerthon on 89 minutes. Borussia faced stronger opponents in the semi-finals, when they were drawn with the then five times champions of Europe, Milan. Nevertheless, Borussia won the first leg 4–0, after a hat-trick from Márcio Amoroso, and a goal on 63 minutes from Jörg Heinrich. Milan manager Carlo Ancelotti admitted he was not surprised with the result, stating that, "We knew they had quick strikers. I am more surprised by the terrible performance of our team. The problem stemmed from the wings. I had no reason to change the team because Rui Costa has not trained for 10 days. It will be very difficult but it is our duty to give it our best and to try and qualify." In the second leg, Milan won 3–1, with Filippo Inzaghi, and Cosmin Contra scoring within 18 minutes. However, Milan did not get their third goal until injury time when Serginho scored a penalty after Inzaghi was adjudged to have been pulled back by Christoph Metzelder. With Milan still needing one goal to force extra time, Lars Ricken scored for Dortmund in the fourth minute of injury time to put the club into their first European final since winning the 1997 Champions League Final.

=== Feyenoord ===
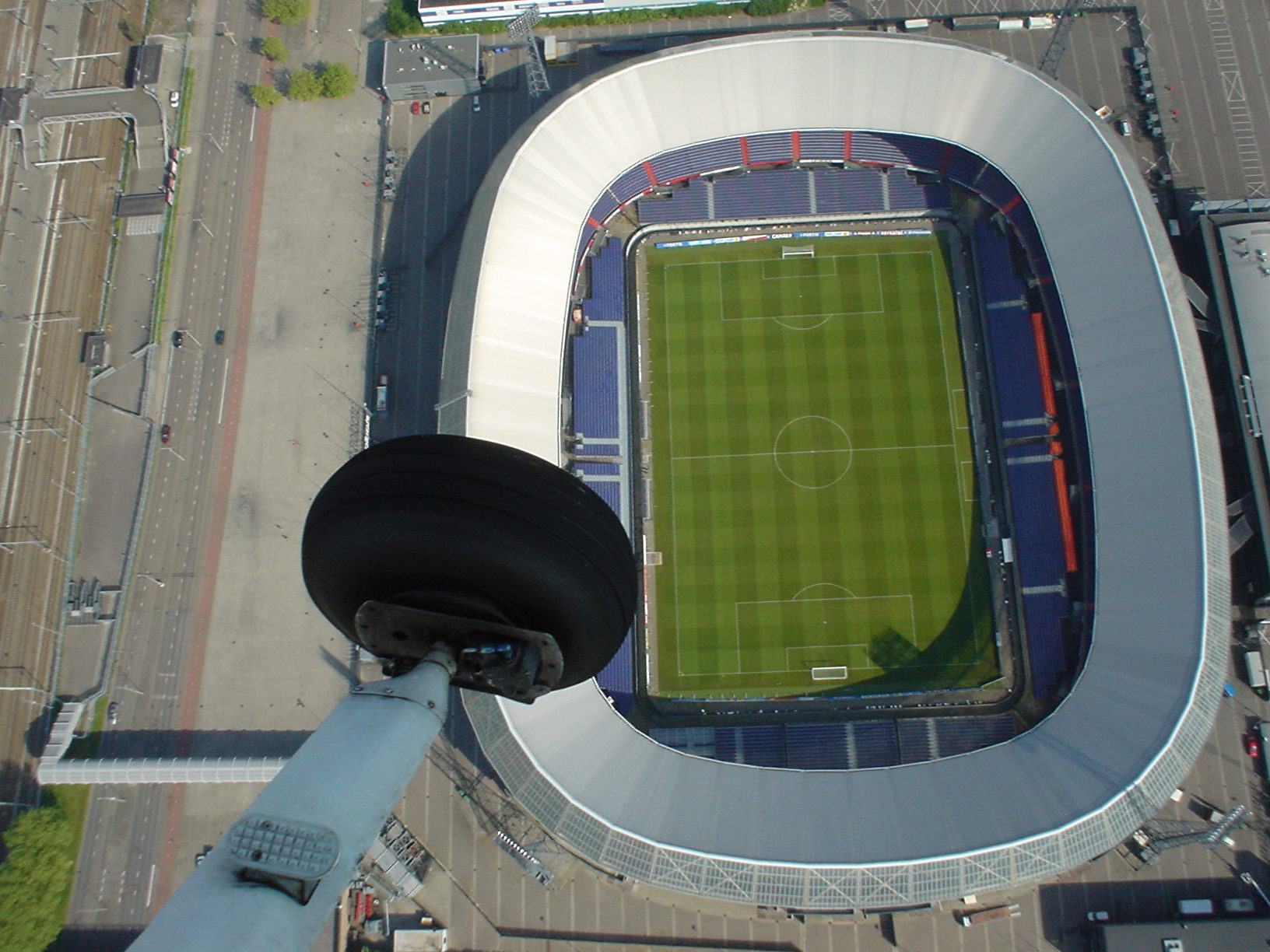
De Kuip Stadium venue of the 2002 UEFA Cup Final

Feyenoord went straight to the first group stage of the Champions League after finishing second in the Eredivisie but were eliminated after only winning one game, and finishing six points behind Sparta Prague, and were consequently drawn against SC Freiburg of Germany in the third round of the UEFA Cup. Feyenoord won the first leg 1–0, after a late goal from Shinji Ono. The second leg was drawn 2–2, however Feyenoord came close to going out, as Freiburg took a 2–0 lead on 49 minutes with goals from Sebastian Kehl and Levan Kobiashvili, to make the aggregate score 2–1 in Freiburg's favour. But on 57 minutes, Pierre van Hooijdonk pulled a goal back, to make it 2–2 on aggregate, which would see Feyenoord going through due to the away goal rule. Feyenoord secured their place in the fourth round when Leonardo scored in the 86th minute. Feyenoord faced Rangers of Scotland in the fourth round with the tie proving to be a close affair. The first leg ended 1–1, in Glasgow, Feyenoord had gone ahead on 72 minutes through Shinji Ono, but Rangers equalised after Peter Løvenkrands was brought down by Glenn Loovens on 81 minutes. Barry Ferguson scored the subsequent penalty. The second leg in Rotterdam ended 3–2 in Feyenoord's favor, the match was notable for the sending off of one player on each side Patrick Paauwe for Feyenoord and Neil McCann for Rangers.

Feyenoord were paired with fellow Dutch side PSV Eindhoven in the quarter-finals, and the tie came down to a penalty shootout, which Feyenoord won 5–4. The first leg was drawn 1–1 with Feyenoord taking the lead in first half injury time through Pierre van Hooijdonk. PSV equalised two minutes after the restart when Mateja Kežman scored on 47 minutes. The second leg was again drawn 1–1, with PSV taking the lead on 75 minutes, when Mark van Bommel scored from outside the penalty area. That looked to have sent PSV into the semi-finals, but with seconds remaining, Van Hooijdonk scored from Johan Elmander's cross to send the tie into extra-time. PSV were reduced to ten men in extra time when Van Bommel was sent off for a second bookable offence but they still managed to hold out for the extra 30 minutes to force a penalty shootout. All penalties were converted until Giorgi Gakhokidze stepped up, and saw his penalty saved. Feyenoord converted their subsequent penalties, with Van Hooijdonk putting away the vital fifth penalty. Like Borussia, Feyenoord faced opposition from the city of Milan in the semi-finals, in the shape of Inter Milan. Around 10,000 Feyenoord fans made the trip to the scene of Feyenoord's 1970 European Cup victory for the first leg. Feyenoord won the first leg 1–0 to gain a vital away goal after Iván Córdoba scored an own goal. The second leg started well for Feyenoord after going 2–0 up inside 34 minutes, due to goals from Van Hooijdonk and Jon Dahl Tomasson, to put Feyenoord 3–0 up on aggregate. Inter came back into the tie in the last minutes when they pulled two goals back through Javier Zanetti and Mohamed Kallon, but Feyenoord secured their place in the final with a 3–2 aggregate victory.

== Match ==
=== Summary ===
==== First half ====
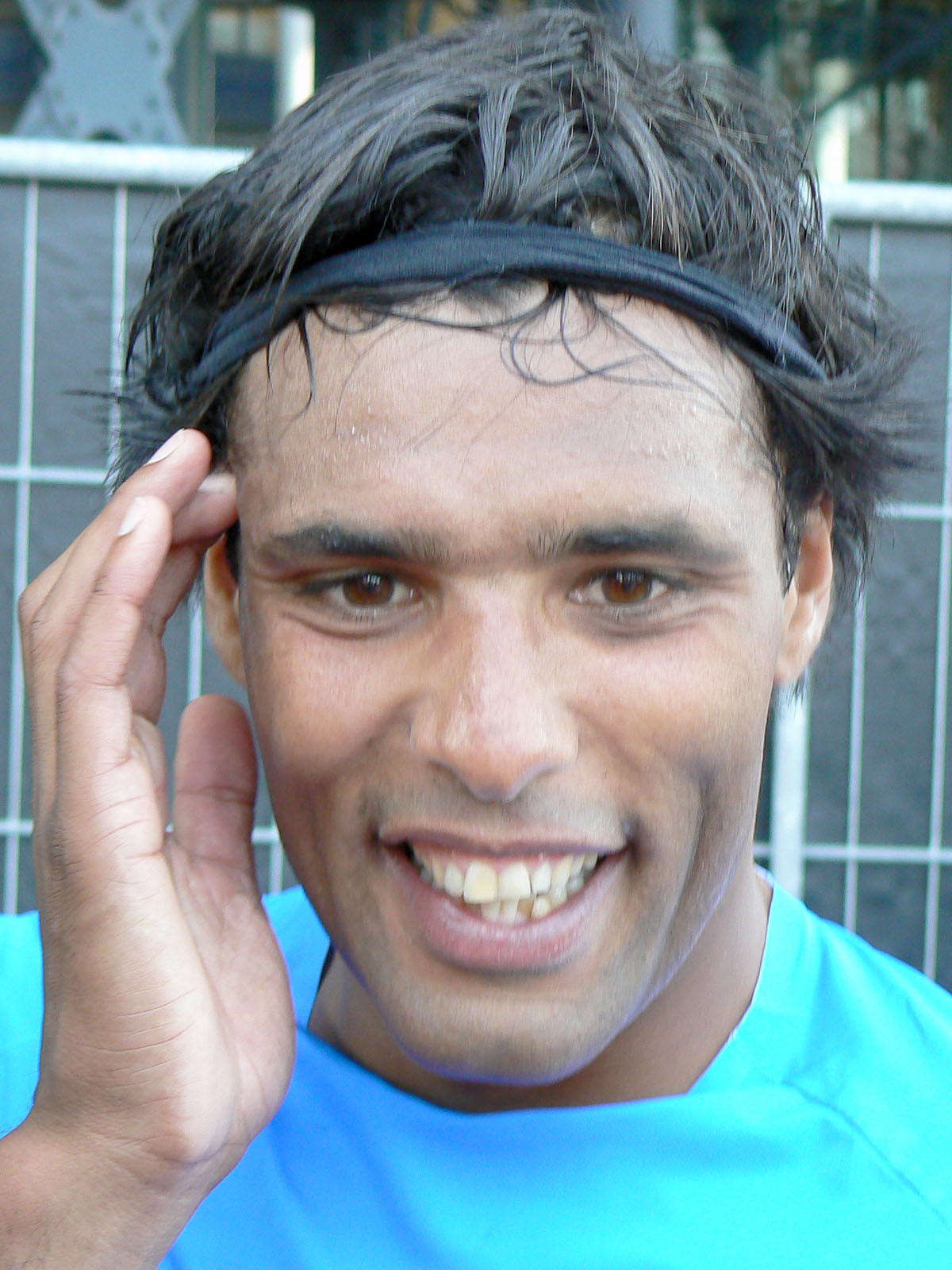
Pierre van Hooijdonk scored twice for Feyenoord in the first half

The first shot on goal was registered by Bonaventure Kalou, who forced a save out of Jens Lehmann. After 10 minutes, Shinji Ono spotted Lehmann off his line but sent his lofted shot wide of the target. This sparked Dortmund into life; they were thwarted when Patrick Paauwe intercepted Jan Koller just as he was looking to get his shot away. On 15 minutes, they came even closer to breaking the deadlock, when Amoroso picked out Tomáš Rosický; however, he shot straight at Edwin Zoetebier. On 19 minutes, Pierre van Hooijdonk came close to scoring with a free kick, which hit the right-hand post. Feyenoord's Tomasz Rząsa was then booked for dissent on 23 minutes, and following the resulting free kick, Evanílson came close to scoring, though his shot went over the crossbar after Ewerthon's pass had sent him through.

The deadlock was broken on 31 minutes when Jürgen Kohler, who was playing his last game for Dortmund, pulled back Jon Dahl Tomasson in the Dortmund penalty area; Kohler was shown a straight red card, and Van Hooijdonk converted the subsequent penalty, dispatching it to Jens Lehmann's right hand side. Feyenoord made it 2–0 seven minutes later when Van Hooijdonk, scored a free kick from the edge of the area, his eighth goal over the course of the season's competition.

==== Second half ====
After half time, Dortmund were handed a way back into the match when Márcio Amoroso was brought down by Patrick Paauwe. Paauwe was spared Kohler's fate as he only received a yellow card. Amoroso scored the following penalty and the score was 2–1. Two minutes later, Amoroso was cautioned for diving in an attempt to win another spot kick. Just three minutes after Dortmund scored, Jon Dahl Tomasson who was playing his last game for Feyenoord before his move to Milan, scored after beating the offside trap, and being put through by Shinji Ono. Dortmund once again found a way back into the match when Jan Koller volleyed home his shot from 25 metres on 58 minutes, after capitalizing on a weak defensive header. Dortmund now assumed the ascendancy with attack after attack, whilst Feyenoord seemed content to sit back and try to see the game out. Dortmund tried everything to find the equaliser replacing Lars Ricken with Jörg Heinrich, and Ewerthon was replaced by Otto Addo, however it was to no avail as Feyenoord saw the game out to win 3–2 and continue their streak of never losing a European final.

=== Details ===
8 May 2002
20:45 UTC+2

Feyenoord (Netherlands)	3–2	(Germany) Borussia Dortmund
Van Hooijdonk 33' (pen.), 40'; Tomasson 50'	Report	Amoroso 47' (pen.); Koller 58'

Feijenoord Stadion, Rotterdam
Attendance: 45,611
Referee: Vítor Melo Pereira (Portugal)

Feyenoord	Borussia Dortmund

GK	1	(Netherlands) Edwin Zoetebier
RB	2	(Ghana) Christian Gyan
CB	8	(Netherlands) Kees van Wonderen
CB	17	(Netherlands) Patrick Paauwe	(yellow card) 46'
LB	3	(Poland) Tomasz Rząsa	(yellow card) 23'
CM	6	(Netherlands) Paul Bosvelt (c)
CM	10	(Denmark) Jon Dahl Tomasson
CM	14	(Japan) Shinji Ono		(substituted off) 85'
RF	7	(Ivory Coast) Bonaventure Kalou		(substituted off) 76'
CF	9	(Netherlands) Pierre van Hooijdonk
LF	32	(Netherlands) Robin van Persie	(yellow card) 63'	(substituted off) 63'
Substitutes:
GK	30	(Netherlands) Henk Timmer
DF	4	(Chile) Mauricio Aros
DF	20	(Netherlands) Ferry de Haan	(yellow card) 85'	(substituted on) 85'
DF	26	(Belgium) Pieter Collen
FW	11	(Brazil) Leonardo		(substituted on) 63'
FW	15	(Sweden) Johan Elmander		(substituted on) 76'
FW	18	(Russia) Igor Korneyev
Manager:
(Netherlands) Bert van Marwijk

GK	1	(Germany) Jens Lehmann
RB	3	(Brazil) Evanílson
CB	2	(Germany) Christian Wörns
CB	5	(Germany) Jürgen Kohler	(red card) 31'
LB	17	(Brazil) Dedé	(yellow card) 52'
CM	7	(Germany) Stefan Reuter (c)
CM	18	(Germany) Lars Ricken		(substituted off) 70'
AM	10	(Czech Republic) Tomáš Rosický	(yellow card) 66'
RF	12	(Brazil) Ewerthon		(substituted off) 61'
CF	8	(Czech Republic) Jan Koller
LF	22	(Brazil) Márcio Amoroso	(yellow card) 49'
Substitutes:
GK	20	(Germany) Philipp Laux
DF	6	(Germany) Jörg Heinrich		(substituted on) 70'
DF	23	(Algeria) Ahmed Reda Madouni
MF	4	(Federal Republic of Yugoslavia) Miroslav Stević
MF	15	(Nigeria) Sunday Oliseh
MF	19	(Ghana) Otto Addo		(substituted on) 61'
FW	29	(Norway) Jan-Derek Sørensen
Manager:
(Germany) Matthias Sammer

Man of the Match:
Jon Dahl Tomasson (Feyenoord)

Assistant referees:
Paulo Januário (Portugal)
Carlos Matos (Portugal)
Fourth official:
Lucílio Batista (Portugal)

Match rules

- 90 minutes
- 30 minutes of extra time if necessary
- Penalty shoot-out if scores still level
- Seven named substitutes
- Maximum of three substitutions

=== Statistics ===
First half
Statistic	Feyenoord	Borussia Dortmund
Goals scored	2	0
Total shots	6	4
Shots on target	4	2
Ball possession	53%	47%
Corner kicks	0	1
Fouls committed	7	10
Offsides	1	2
Yellow cards	1	0
Red cards	0	1

Second half
Statistic	Feyenoord	Borussia Dortmund
Goals scored	1	2
Total shots	7	5
Shots on target	2	3
Ball possession	51%	49%
Corner kicks	2	1
Fouls committed	13	9
Offsides	1	3
Yellow cards	3	3
Red cards	0	0

Overall
Statistic	Feyenoord	Borussia Dortmund
Goals scored	3	2
Total shots	13	9
Shots on target	6	5
Ball possession	52%	48%
Corner kicks	2	2
Fouls committed	20	19
Offsides	2	5
Yellow cards	4	3
Red cards	0	1

== Post-match ==
A huge party erupted both inside and outside De Kuip not only because of the title, but also because the final was held two days after Rotterdam's politician Pim Fortuyn was murdered. Many Feyenoord fans were still full of emotion before and after the match. As a result of Fortuyn's murder, the victory was not officially celebrated in Coolsingel Square with their fans. During Feyenoord's UEFA Cup run, a parody was launched of the song "Put Your Hands Up" by Black & White Brothers, "Put Your Hands Up for Pi-Air", as a tribute to Pierre van Hooijdonk.

== See also ==
- 2002 UEFA Champions League final
- 2002 UEFA Super Cup
- Borussia Dortmund in international football
- Feyenoord in international football
- 2001–02 Borussia Dortmund season
- 2001–02 Feyenoord season
