= Robin van Persie =

Dutch football player and coach (born 1983)

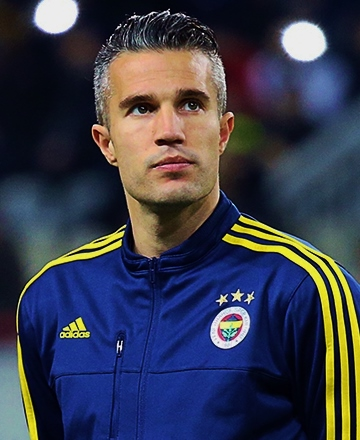
- Van Persie with Fenerbahçe in 2016

Personal information
- Full name: Robin van Persie
- Date of birth: 6 August 1983 (age 43)
- Place of birth: Rotterdam, Netherlands
- Height: 1.86 m (6 ft 1 in)
- Position: Striker

Youth career
- 1988–1999: Excelsior
- 1999–2001: Feyenoord

Senior career*
Years	Team	Apps	(Gls)
2001–2004	Feyenoord	61	(14)
2004–2012	Arsenal	194	(96)
2012–2015	Manchester United	86	(48)
2015–2018	Fenerbahçe	57	(25)
2018–2019	Feyenoord	37	(21)
Total		435	(204)

International career
2000	Netherlands U17	6	(0)
2001	Netherlands U19	6	(0)
2002–2005	Netherlands U21	12	(1)
2005–2017	Netherlands	102	(50)

Managerial career
- 2024–2025: Heerenveen
- 2025–2026: Feyenoord
Medal record
Men's football
Representing Netherlands
FIFA World Cup
Runner-up	2010 South Africa
Third place	2014 Brazil
- * Club domestic league appearances and goals

Robin van Persie (Dutch pronunciation: [ˈrɔbɪɱ vɑm ˈpɛrsi]; born 6 August 1983) is a Dutch football coach and former professional footballer. He last served as the head coach of Eredivisie club Feyenoord. He is regarded as one of the best strikers of his generation and was known for his technique, ball control, and vision.

Starting his career as a winger, Van Persie made his senior debut for Feyenoord during the 2001–02 season, which culminated with victory in the 2002 UEFA Cup final; he was also named as the Dutch Football Talent of the Year. After five years with Feyenoord, he fell out with manager Bert van Marwijk, and he joined English club Arsenal in 2004 as a long-term replacement for compatriot Dennis Bergkamp. In his debut season, he scored several goals en route to the club's FA Cup win, and featured in their UEFA Champions League run to the final in 2005–06. Following the departures of Bergkamp and Thierry Henry, Van Persie was converted to a sole striker and went on to score 111 goals in his next 199 matches for the club. He was club captain for the 2011–12 season, during which he was awarded the PFA Players' Player of the Year, FWA Footballer of the Year, and the Premier League Golden Boot.

Following disillusion with Arsenal's direction, Van Persie joined rivals Manchester United in July 2012. He was integral to United winning the Premier League title in his debut season, earning his second consecutive Premier League Golden Boot. After two injury-hit seasons followed, Van Persie fell out of favour at United and he was allowed to leave for Fenerbahçe in July 2015. During his spell in Turkey, Van Persie featured regularly in his first season, but saw limited playing time thereafter due to injuries, with both club and player agreeing to a buyout in January 2018. He then rejoined Feyenoord on a free transfer. By the end of the season he had helped his boyhood team win the Dutch Cup.

After representing the Netherlands at under-17, under-19 and under-21 level, Van Persie made his senior international debut in 2005 in a friendly match against Romania. A month later, he scored his first senior international goal in a 4–0 win over Finland. Van Persie recorded over 100 caps and scored 50 goals for the Netherlands (he was the nation's all-time top goalscorer until 2025). From 2013 to 2015 served as the team's captain. He represented his country at the 2006, 2010 and 2014 FIFA World Cups, and the 2008 and 2012 UEFA European Championships, reaching the final in 2010 and winning bronze in 2014.

After retirement, Van Persie transitioned into coaching. His first job was at Heerenveen, before being appointed head coach at his former club Feyenoord in February 2025. He was dismissed in June 2026.

== Club career ==
=== Feyenoord ===
Born in Rotterdam, Van Persie joined the youth squad of local side Excelsior when he was five, but left for Feyenoord at the age of 16 after falling out with the Excelsior coaching staff over his "petulant" attitude. An injury crisis at Feyenoord meant he was quickly promoted into the first team, and made his debut for the club at 17, the first of 15 total starts during the 2001–02 season. After starting for Feyenoord in the final of the UEFA Cup, which resulted in a 3–2 win against Borussia Dortmund, Van Persie received the KNVB Best Young Talent award.

The following season, Van Persie signed a three-and-a-half-year professional contract with Feyenoord, and scored five goals in a 6–1 KNVB Cup thrashing of AGOVV Apeldoorn on 6 February 2003. However, clashes with his manager Bert van Marwijk saw Van Persie demoted to the reserve squad. During a match featuring the Feyenoord and Ajax reserves, he was one of several Feyenoord players assaulted by hooligans who had invaded the pitch. Van Persie's rift with Van Marwijk continued when he was sent home on the eve of the 2002 UEFA Super Cup final against Real Madrid after the coach was displeased with Van Persie's body language after being asked to warm up for a Champions League qualifier. Van Persie finished his tumultuous first full season with the first team having scored eight goals in a total of 28 appearances, in addition to finishing runner-up in the KNVB Cup.

Feyenoord unsuccessfully attempted to extend Van Persie's contract during the off-season, and his deteriorating relationship with Van Marwijk led to his spending most of the 2003–04 season on the bench. He again played 28 matches, but finished with two fewer goals than the previous season. Feyenoord shopped him at the end of the campaign but found few takers due to Van Persie's past disciplinary issues. During the January transfer window, the Eredivisie club opened negotiations with Arsenal, who were seeking a long-term replacement for aging veteran Dennis Bergkamp, but both parties could not agree to terms.

=== Arsenal ===
==== 2004–05 season ====
On 17 May 2004, Van Persie signed a four-year deal with Arsenal for £2.75 million, just over half of Feyenoord's original asking price of £5 million. Arsenal manager Arsène Wenger, who planned to convert Van Persie from a left winger to a centre forward as he had successfully done with star player Thierry Henry, said of his new acquisition, "He can play on the left side of midfield, as a creative player behind the main strikers or as a target man." Arsenal had further padded their stable of strikers in January by signing Spanish forward José Antonio Reyes, leaving the two to battle for playing time. Van Persie made his debut and won a trophy in the process, as he came on as a substitute in the 3–1 FA Community Shield victory over Manchester United on 8 August 2004. Van Persie spent most of his time on the bench during earlier parts of the 2004–05 season, and marked his first competitive start on 27 October by scoring Arsenal's opening goal in a 2–1 League Cup win over Manchester City.

It was the goal of a lifetime. He's played for a long time and I'm not sure he's scored one like that.

— Arsène Wenger, regarding Van Persie's goal against Charlton Athletic in the 2006–07 Premier League

He was sent off for the first time, however, in an Arsenal shirt on 26 February during a 1–1 road draw with Southampton, following a lunge at left-back Graeme Le Saux, for which Wenger was seen yelling an obscenity at Van Persie from the sidelines. He then later lambasted his charge in the press. "I do not support Van Persie today, but he did not look out of control at half-time. When the referee has sent off a home player, he is under pressure, so, if any player had to behave, it was him." Meanwhile, Telegraph sportswriter Clive White described Van Persie in his match report as "21 going on nine."

Van Persie was consequently benched for a number of games, starting with Arsenal's upcoming replay in the FA Cup against Sheffield United, and he was reintroduced into the squad only after Henry was out with a calf injury, and his return to the first team saw him score twice in a Cup semi-final win over Blackburn Rovers. He came on as a substitute in the final and scored one of the penalties in the shootout as Arsenal beat Manchester United. The end of Van Persie's season was disrupted by injury, and he finished with ten goals in 41 appearances in all competitions.

==== 2005–06 season ====
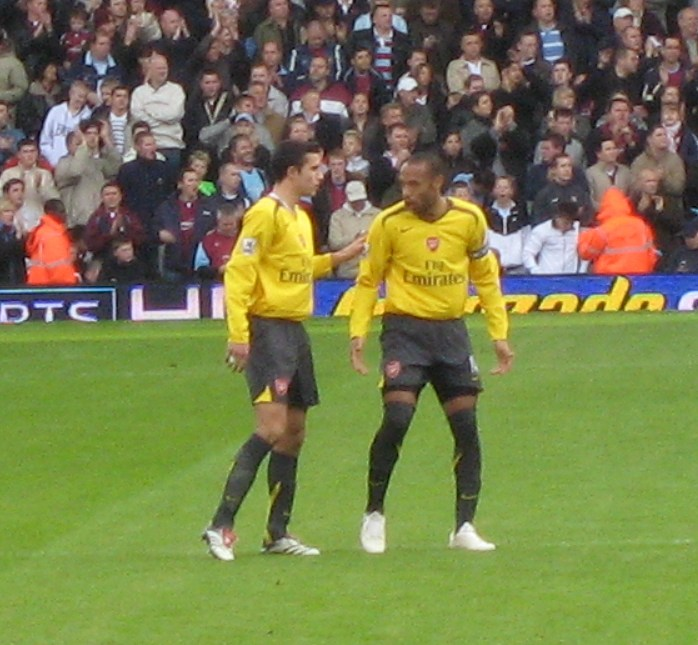
After the retirement of Dennis Bergkamp, Van Persie regularly partnered Thierry Henry in the Arsenal attack.

Van Persie's good form at the start of the 2005–06 season earned him the Premier League Player of the Month award for November 2005 after eight goals in eight starts, and he was rewarded with a five-year contract extension until 2011 on 4 January. Two days after signing the contract, however, Van Persie was again hit by injury when an opponent stepped on his foot and broke his toe during an FA Cup match against Cardiff.

Van Persie played the next three matches with a hole cut into his shoe to alleviate the pain until he was finally rested for Arsenal's Premier League match against West Ham United on 1 February. He was an unused substitute in Arsenal's first Champions League final appearance, a 2–1 loss to Barcelona.

==== 2006–07 season ====
The beginning of the 2006–07 season included an airborne volley against Charlton Athletic that Wenger called "the goal of a lifetime" and was later named BBC Sport's Goal of the Month for September, and he capped off the calendar year by being named the 2006 Rotterdam Sportsman of the Year. His season, however, ended early for the second time in his career on 21 January, when he fractured the fifth metatarsal in his right foot while celebrating his late equalizer in a match against Manchester United. Although Van Persie was injured for a large part of the season he still managed to finish as Arsenal's top goalscorer with 13 goals in all competitions.

==== 2007–08 season ====
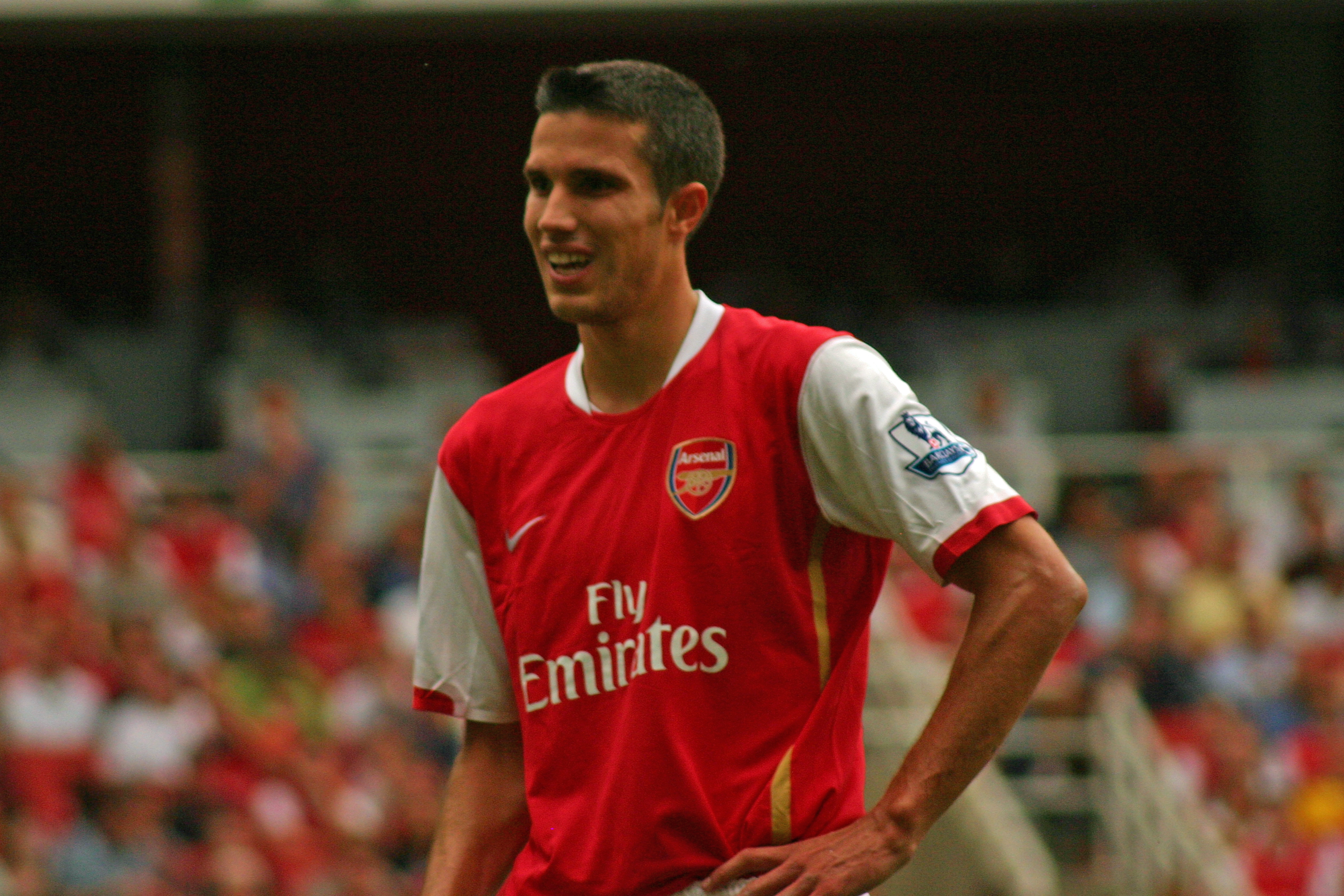
Van Persie playing for Arsenal in 2007

After Henry departed for Barcelona prior to the 2007–08 season, Van Persie assumed the role as Arsenal's main striker. Following a streak of seven goals in ten regular-season games, Van Persie was sidelined for two months with a knee injury suffered on international duty. He made his comeback in Arsenal's Champions League group stage win over Steaua București on 12 December and made his Premier League return in the win against Chelsea over the weekend. He picked up, however, a recurrent injury that kept him sidelined until January when he played 45 minutes in a League Cup game against Tottenham Hotspur. He was withdrawn at half-time following another injury scare and featured sporadically throughout the rest of the campaign.

==== 2008–09 season ====
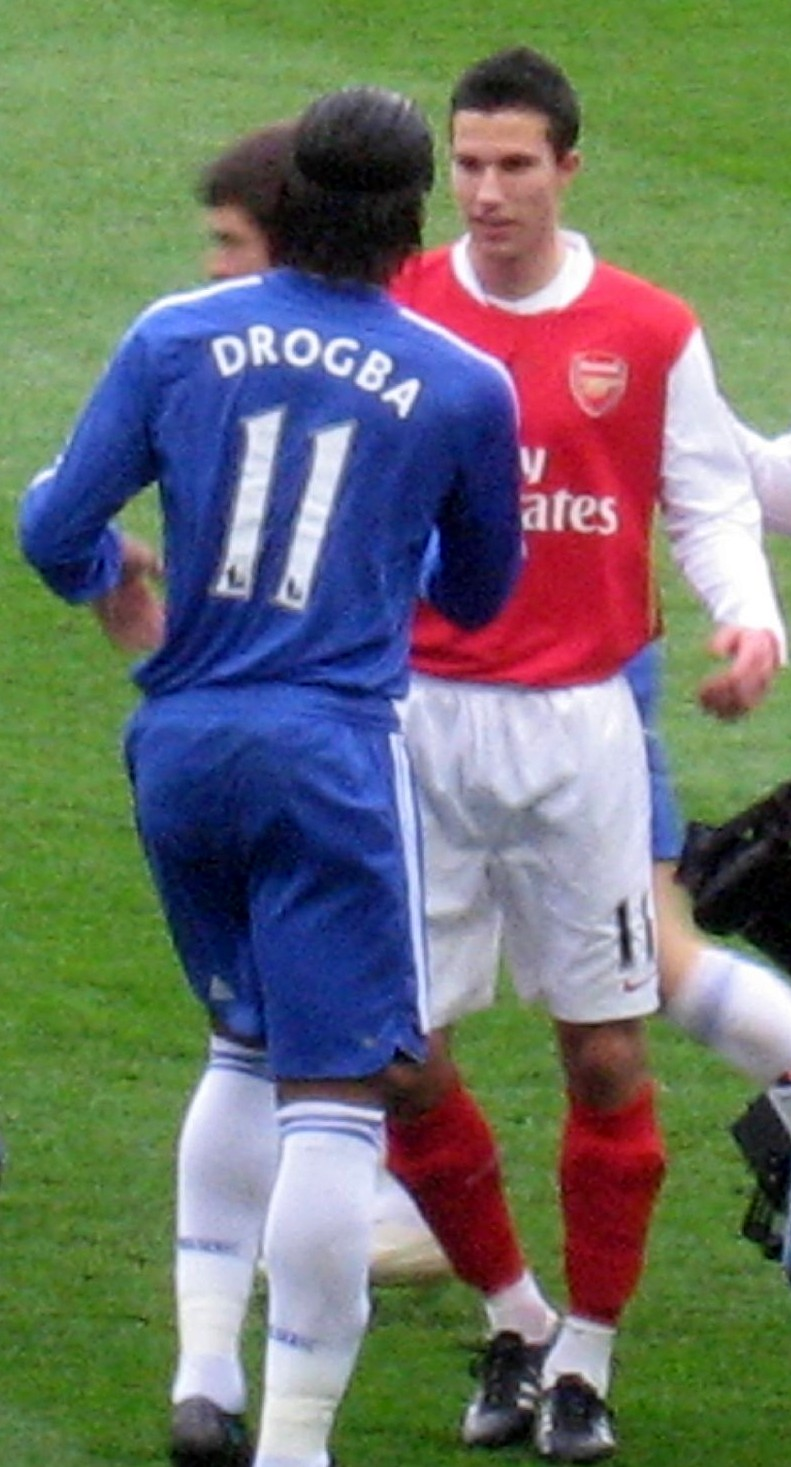
Van Persie and Chelsea striker Didier Drogba in 2008

Van Persie opened his 2008–09 account on 31 August with a brace in Arsenal's 3–0 league victory over Newcastle United. On 29 October, he scored his fiftieth career Arsenal goal in a 4–4 home draw with North London derby rivals Tottenham, but was hit with his first red card of the season on 1 November after knocking down goalkeeper Thomas Sørensen with a shoulder charge in a 2–1 loss to Stoke City. Sørensen later admitted to "teasing" Van Persie in an attempt to provoke a reaction. On 30 November, he scored a brace against Chelsea to help Arsenal come from behind and pick up a 2–1 victory at Stamford Bridge. On 21 December 2008, he scored a spectacular goal against Liverpool, which was later named the second BBC Goal of the Month of his career. With captain Cesc Fàbregas injured and regular stand-in skipper Manuel Almunia rested, Van Persie captained Arsenal for the first time on 3 January 2009 for the club's 3–1 FA Cup third round victory over Plymouth Argyle. Van Persie scored Arsenal's first and third goals, while the second was a result of his cross being deflected into the net by a Plymouth player for an own goal.

In January 2009, every Arsenal goal that month was either scored or assisted by Van Persie, which earned him the club's Player of the Month award. His most inspirational display being against Hull City, where he struck the post with a freekick, and provided three assists to his teammates; he later received the Man of the Match award. On 24 February, Van Persie scored a crucial penalty that earned Arsenal a 1–0 win over Roma in the UEFA Champions League Round of 16 encounter, after he was fouled by defender Philippe Mexès. He followed it up with a fifth Champions League goal by converting another penalty against Villarreal in a 3–0 victory.

On the final day of the Premier League, Van Persie scored a brace against Stoke City, which guaranteed him for the second time in his career as Arsenal's top scorer. He had his best season overall for Arsenal as he scored 11 Premier League goals, along with a league-leading 11 assists and a career best of 20 goals in all competitions. Van Persie was named the 2008–09 Arsenal.com Player of the Season.

==== 2009–10 season ====
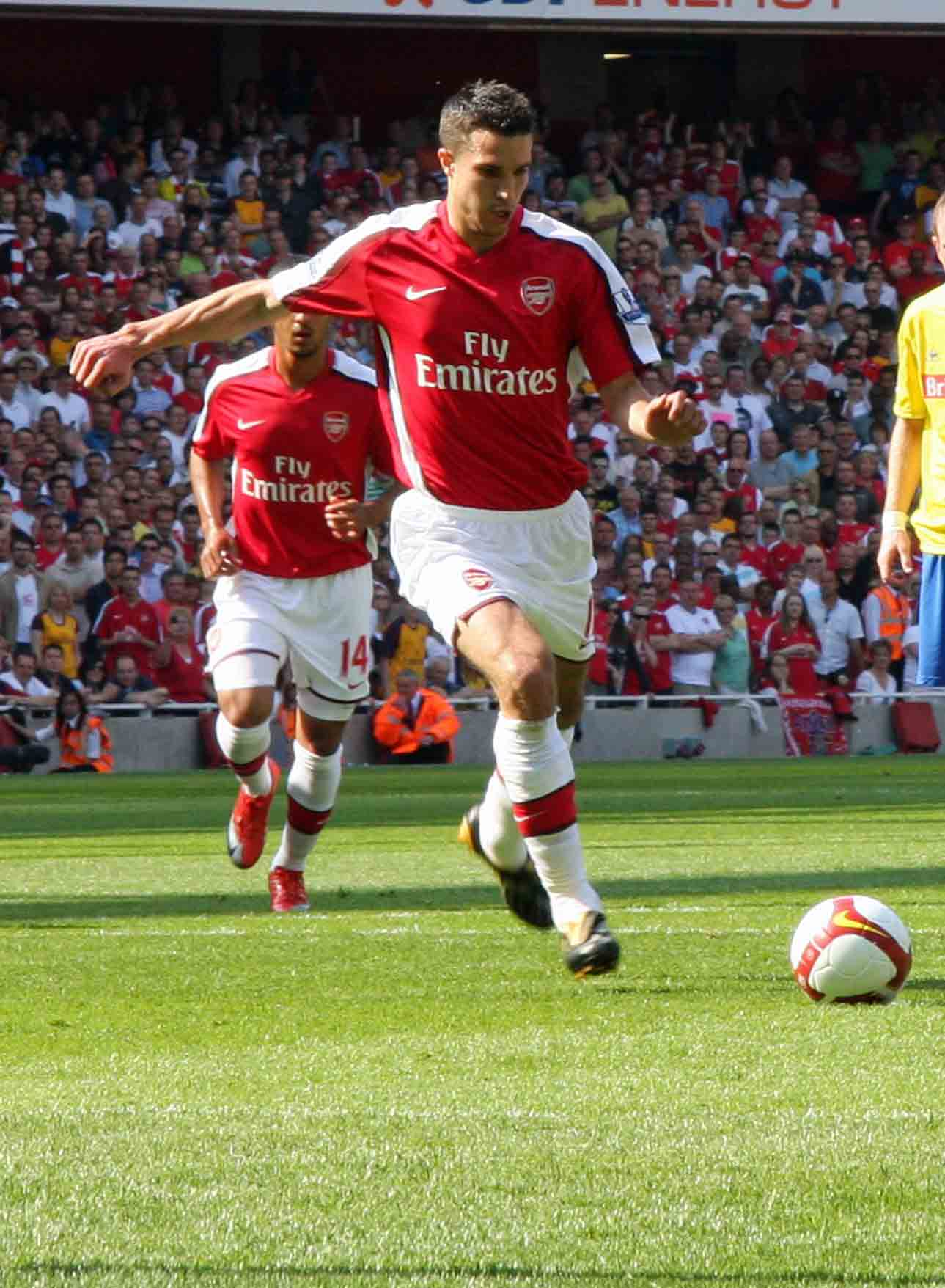
Van Persie taking a penalty kick in 2009

With only one year remaining of his contract, Van Persie was in negotiations with Arsenal about an extension for several months in 2009. Finally, it was announced in July that he had signed a new long-term contract with his club, stating: "My heart is with Arsenal and I just can't picture myself in a different shirt." The departure of Emmanuel Adebayor also meant that the Dutchman was now the main striker in Wenger's 4–3–3 system. Van Persie started the 2009–10 season with two assists in the first match against Everton, which led to a 6–1 victory. As one of the first choice penalty and corner takers, he set up many of Arsenal's goals, including Thomas Vermaelen's debut goal against Everton. He scored his first goal of the season in the 4–2 loss at Eastlands to Manchester City, where he later had his head stomped on by former teammate Adebayor (an act the referee failed to notice, but the FA later charged Adebayor with violent conduct and served him with a three-game suspension).

He then scored goals against Olympiacos, Fulham, Blackburn Rovers, Birmingham City, West Ham United and Tottenham. Van Persie's excellent form in October did not go unrecognised as he was named Premier League Player of the Month for October, his second such award. On 14 November, however, he injured his ankle in an international friendly and was initially expected to be out for six weeks, but further tests showed that he would be out of action for five months. Van Persie made his return on 14 April, in a 2–1 loss to Tottenham Hotspur. He then scored a header against Blackburn Rovers in the 2–1 defeat, and a goal assisted by Theo Walcott in the 4–0 win over Fulham in the last league game of 2009–10 season.

==== 2010–11 season ====
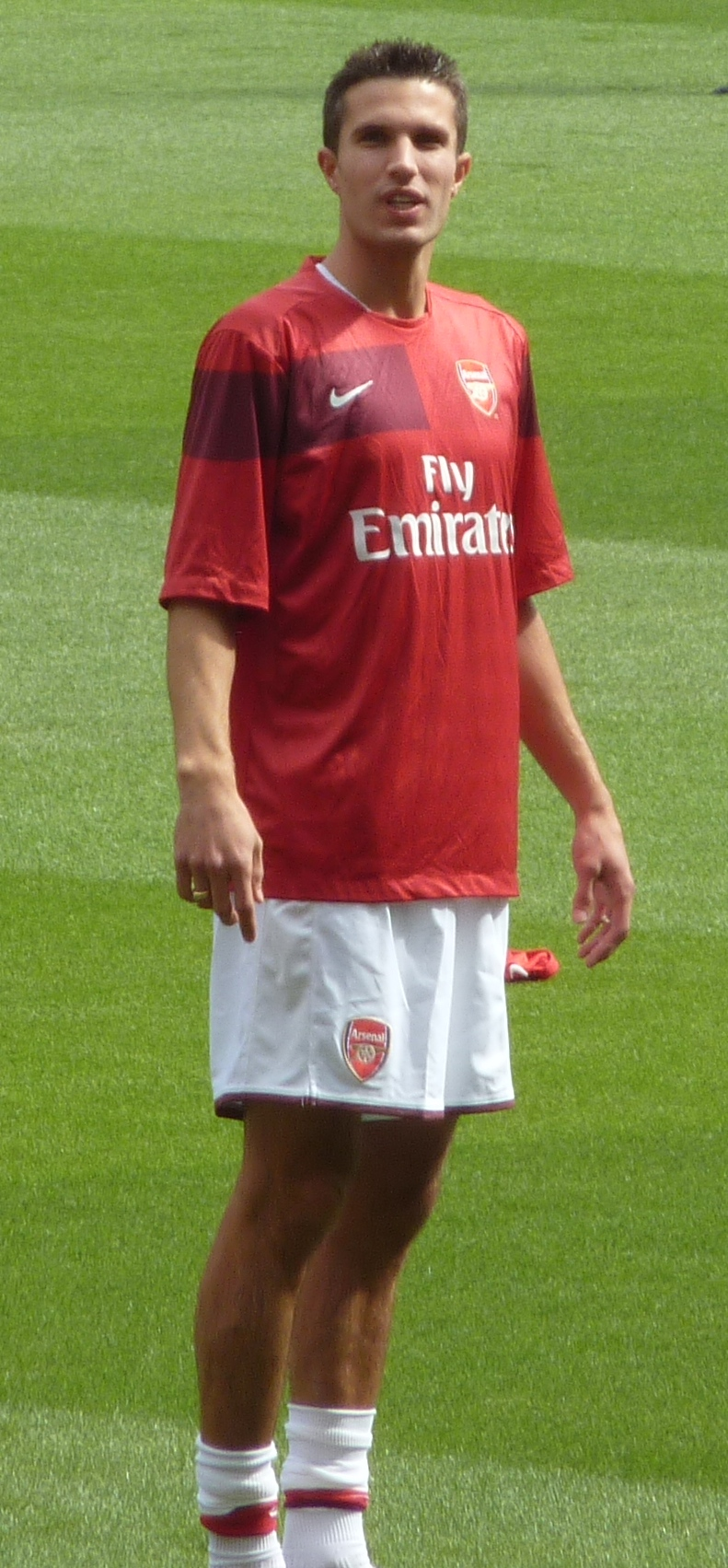
Van Persie with Arsenal in 2010

Before the start of the 2010–11 season, Van Persie changed his squad number to 10, previously worn by Arsenal and Netherlands legend Dennis Bergkamp. He made his 200th appearance on 28 August but an ankle injury suffered in the same game placed him on the sidelines once again. He returned as a substitute for Arsenal's 1–0 home defeat to Newcastle United on 7 November.

On 1 January 2011, Van Persie scored his first goal of the season in a 3–0 away win over Birmingham City. On 15 January, he added two more goals to his tally in a comfortable 3–0 win over West Ham. This made him only the fourth Dutchman to reach 50 goals in England's top division. Van Persie scored his first career hat-trick in a 3–0 win over Wigan Athletic on 22 January and two goals against Newcastle United in a 4–4 draw on 5 February. Continuing his fine form, he hit a brace the following week against Wolverhampton Wanderers scoring both Arsenal goals in a 2–0 win including a volley from inside the box. The ten goals he scored between 1 January and 12 February set a new Premier League record for most goals scored in the first two months of a calendar year.

Van Persie set the Emirates alight with a goal from an almost impossible angle in Arsenal's fightback against Barcelona in the UEFA Champions League Round of 16, which ended 2–1 in favour of the Gunners. On 27 February 2011, Van Persie captained Arsenal at Wembley Stadium in the League Cup final, scoring the first-half equalizer for the Gunners. It was his first goal at Wembley and his first in a cup final for Arsenal. However, he was later taken off in the second half with a knee injury he picked up while scoring the goal.

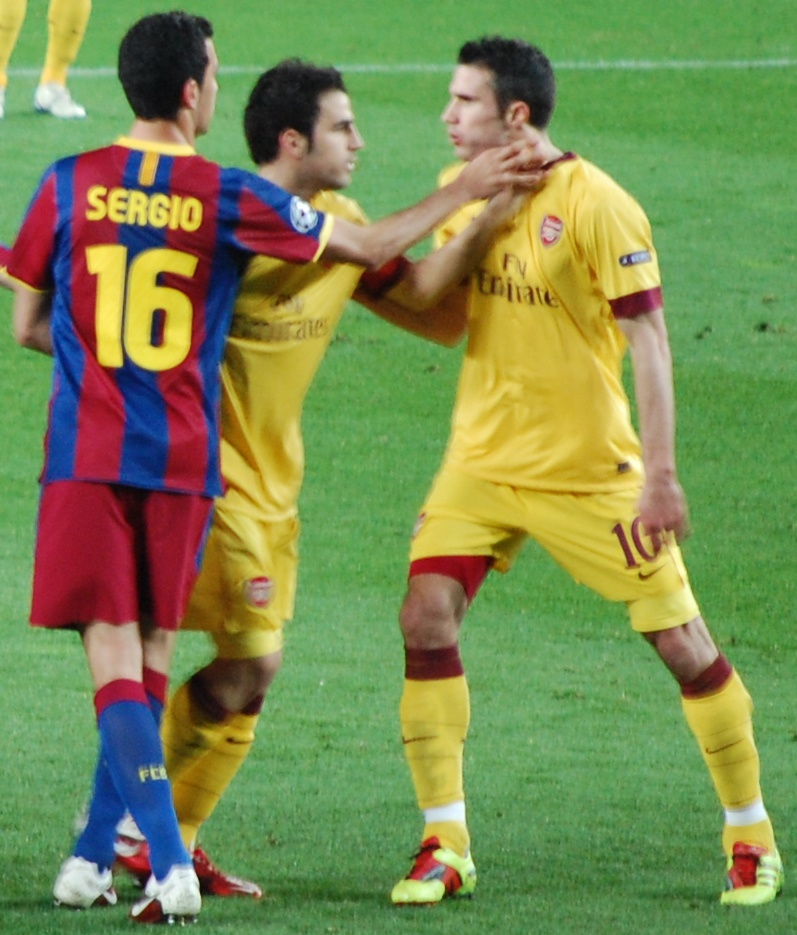
Van Persie with Cesc Fàbregas and Sergio Busquets in a Champions League match in 2011

On 1 March 2011, he was ruled out for three weeks, which would see him miss the Champions League return leg with Barcelona. However, he recovered in time for the return leg at the Camp Nou. During the game, he received a yellow card in the first half for a foul. In 27th minute he could have been sent off for a brutal foul on Lionel Messi but the referee Massimo Busacca didn't give him even a yellow card. Instead, in the second half, he was controversially sent off after receiving a second yellow card when the referee, deemed him to be time-wasting by taking a shot at goal after the whistle was blown (one second earlier) for offside. Barcelona went on to score twice more and advanced to the quarter finals on a 4–3 aggregate result. Afterwards, Van Persie branded Busacca's decision as a "total joke", claiming that with the noise of the 95,000-strong crowd he could not hear the whistle. On 19 March 2011, he scored the equalizing goal in a 2–2 against West Bromwich Albion at The Hawthorns. The match finished 2–2 with Arsenal still five points behind the current leaders, Manchester United.

On 10 April 2011 in a match against Blackpool, Van Persie put in a Man of the Match performance to give Arsenal a crucial 3–1 win as he set up a goal and scored the third. On 24 April 2011, he became the first player to score in seven successive Premier League away games when he scored against Bolton, beating Didier Drogba's record who was on six successive away games, between August and November 2009. However, the Gunners lost 2–1, all but ending their title hopes. On 1 May he assisted Aaron Ramsey who scored the winning goal against league leaders Manchester United to add a twist to the Premier League. Van Persie was named Premier League Player of the Month for April.

On 8 May 2011, Arsenal lost 3–1 against Stoke City at the Britannia Stadium. Van Persie scored the goal for Arsenal and extended his Premier League record by scoring in an eighth successive away match. In the last home game of the season, he scored against Aston Villa, but Arsenal lost the match 2–1. In the last game of the season away to Fulham, he managed to score in his ninth consecutive away match, bringing his goal tally for the season to a personal record of 18 league goals. He also equalled the record held by Cristiano Ronaldo and Thierry Henry by scoring 18 league goals from the turn of the year to the end of the season. He ended the season just two goals behind joint league top scorers, Carlos Tevez and Dimitar Berbatov in the race for the golden boot, despite being injured for half of the season. He was voted as the second best player of the 2010–11 season on Arsenal's official website and also received the team's Goal of the Season award for his audacious strike in the 2–1 victory over Barcelona in the Champions League.

==== 2011–12 season ====
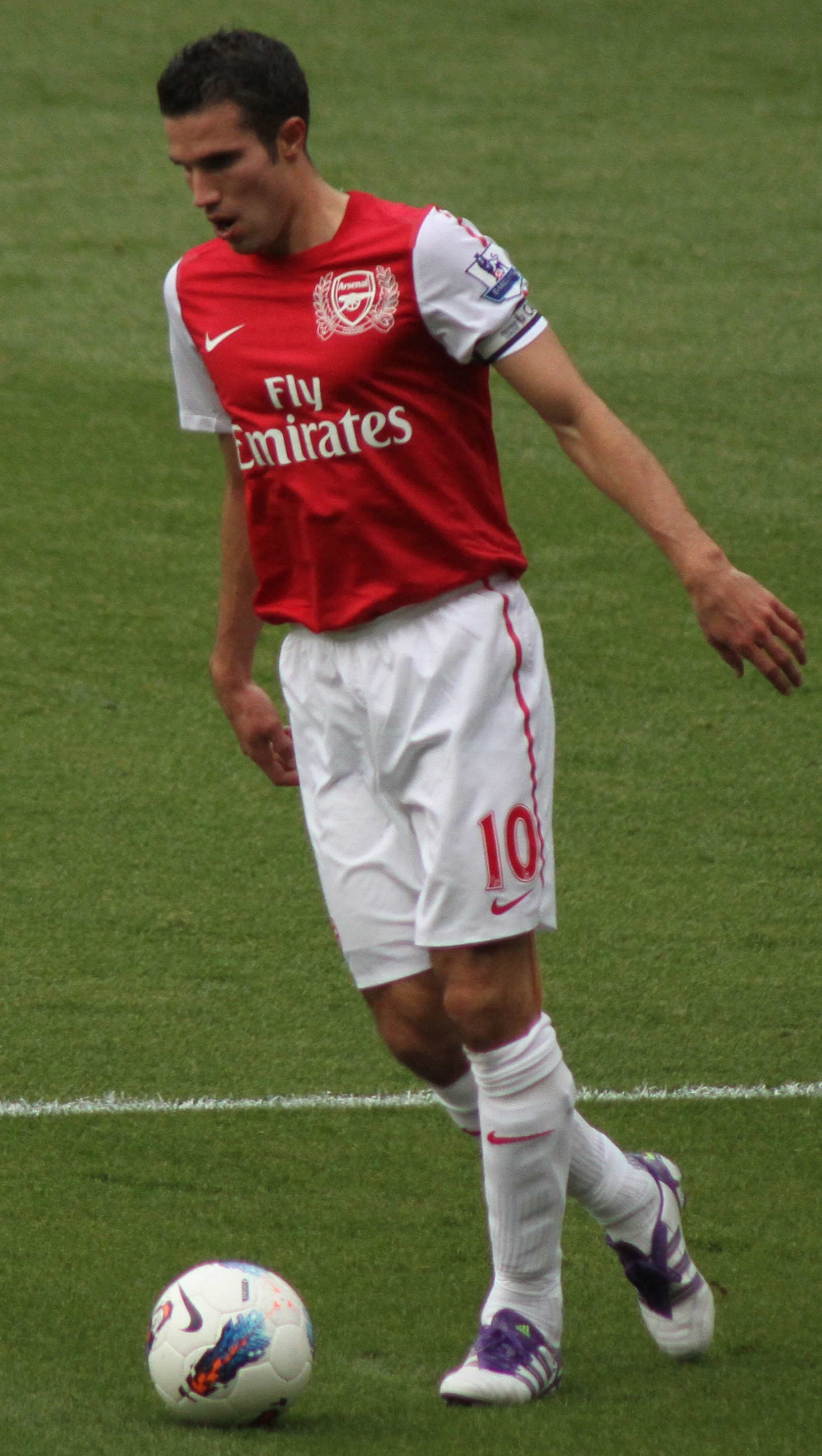
Van Persie was named captain of Arsenal for the 2011–12 season.

Having been appointed vice-captain for the 2010–11 season, Van Persie was promoted to club captain following the transfer of Cesc Fàbregas to Barcelona at the start of the 2011–12 season. On 24 August, Van Persie scored his first goal of the 2011–12 season in the second leg of Arsenal's 2–1 away victory against Udinese in a Champions League play off match. On 24 September 2011, he scored twice against Bolton Wanderers to raise his tally for Arsenal to 100 goals, becoming the 17th Arsenal player to reach this milestone.

On 16 October 2011, he scored the fastest goal of the 2011–12 Premier League season, 28 seconds into a home match against Sunderland. He went on to score a late winner from a curling left foot free kick, to put Arsenal 2–1 ahead. After the match, Van Persie stated his dedication to the club after speculation surrounding a future transfer away from the Emirates. On 23 October, he came on as a substitute in the 66th minute replacing Marouane Chamakh and scored two goals against Stoke City. The match ended 3–1 with another home win for Arsenal.

He then continued his scoring run for Arsenal on 29 October by scoring a hat-trick in Arsenal's 5–3 victory against Chelsea at Stamford Bridge. Due to his consistent performances and good goal-scoring form, Van Persie was named the Premier League Player of the Month for October 2011. He continued scoring as he scored Arsenal's opening goal of the match in their 3–0 win over West Bromwich Albion on 5 November along with two assists. After the international break, he scored both Arsenal goals against Norwich City to help the Gunners to a 2–1 win on 19 November 2011. In Van Persie's fifth Champions League match of the season he scored twice in the 49th and 86th minutes to lift Arsenal to a 2–1 victory over Borussia Dortmund and to qualify Arsenal for the knockout phase on 23 November 2011.

After failing to score against Fulham, Van Persie scored again for Arsenal, this time against Wigan Athletic to make the score 4–0 to Arsenal on 3 December 2011. He then added to his tally with the only goal of the game against Everton, an exquisite volley from an Alex Song long ball. The following match, versus Aston Villa, saw him score a penalty and provide an assist. Van Persie's final goal of the 2011 calendar year came in Arsenal's one-goal win over Queens Park Rangers on the last day of the year. The goal took his tally for the year to 35 goals, one short of Alan Shearer's Premier League record.

The following calendar year started in the same fashion for Van Persie, but Arsenal began to falter, losing three consecutive matches against Fulham, Manchester United and Swansea City, even though the Dutchman scored in the latter two. On 29 January, he rescued his team, scoring two penalties against Aston Villa in the fourth round of the FA Cup to help Arsenal to a 3–2 win after falling 2–0 down in a Man of the Match performance. It was also his 120th goal in an Arsenal shirt, equalling fellow Dutch legend Dennis Bergkamp's total. On 4 February, he overtook Bergkamp as the tenth-highest scorer in Arsenal's history, scoring another hat-trick as Arsenal beat Blackburn 7–1 at home, with three close-range goals from crosses by Theo Walcott and Francis Coquelin. He was also credited with two assists in the game as he set up Alex Oxlade-Chamberlain's first Premier League goal and unselfishly passed to Thierry Henry enabling him to score his first Premier League goal since returning on loan.

With Arsenal in unpredictable form, Van Persie was again of supreme importance for Arsenal, this time in the North London derby against Tottenham Hotspur, played on 26 February. Arsenal went 2–0 down at half in the first half, but Van Persie equalised before half-time. In the second half, he gave the assist to Walcott's goal as Arsenal performed a remarkable comeback to win the game 5–2. A week later, Van Persie scored both goals in a 2–1 away win at Liverpool, one being a left-footed volley assisted by Alex Song, similar to the goal he scored against Everton earlier in the campaign. On 11 April 2012, after scoring the penalty against Wolverhampton Wanderers in a 3–0 away win, he became only the second player, after Ian Wright, to score against 17 Premier League clubs in a 20-team campaign. He finished as the top goal-scorer in the Premier League with 30 goals, and became Arsenal's eighth all-time top scorer with 132 goals.

On 4 July 2012, Van Persie announced that he would not be signing a new contract with Arsenal. This followed a breakdown in the relationship between Van Persie and the club, with Van Persie and Arsenal Chief Executive Ivan Gazidis disagreeing on the direction of the club going forward in terms of Premier League title ambitions, feeling like his position as the club's captain and that season's Golden Boot winner would see his opinions be valued. While Van Persie claims that Arsenal did not offer him a new contract following talks, he said that he is still grateful to the club and Wenger and harbours no ill-will towards Gazidis.

=== Manchester United ===
==== 2012–13 season ====
"I always listen to the little boy inside of me in these situations—when you have to make the harder decisions in life. What does he want? That boy was screaming for Man United. From my side, and Arsenal as well, there are no hard feelings. There were certain elements which were vital to me that we had a different view. That is life. Nobody is angry at me and I'm not angry at them."

— Robin van Persie on his transfer to Manchester United

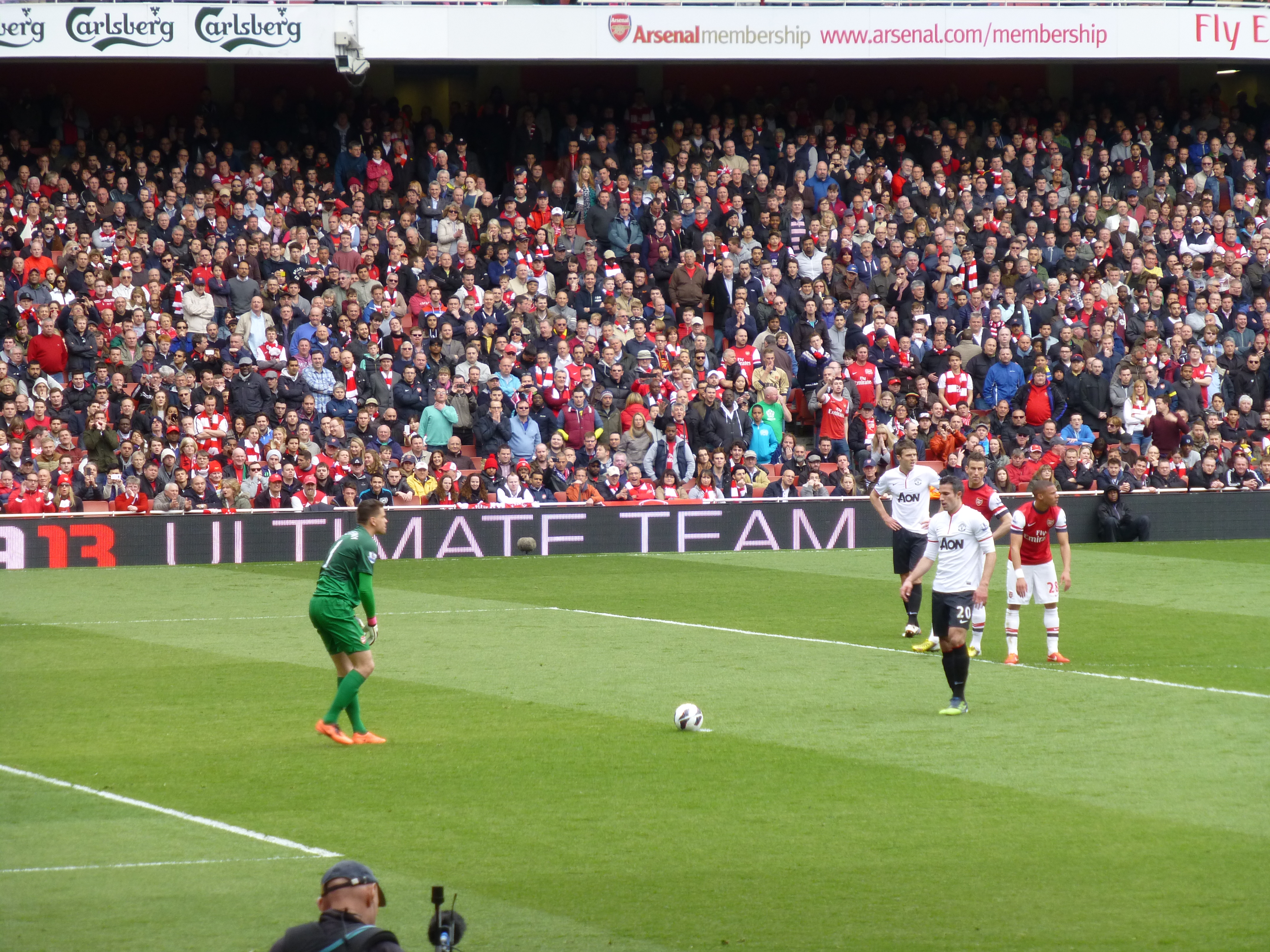
Van Persie prepares to take a penalty for Manchester United against former club Arsenal at the Emirates in 2013.

On 15 August 2012, Arsenal announced they had agreed terms with Manchester United for his transfer, but Van Persie had yet to agree to personal terms with the club. On 17 August, Van Persie transferred to Manchester United for an initial £22.5 million, with an additional £1.5 million to follow if United won a Premier League or Champions League title within the next four years. He signed a four-year contract, keeping him at the club until June 2016. Van Persie chose the number 20 shirt after assistant coach René Meulensteen convinced him that he would help secure Manchester United's 20th league title.

He made his debut on 20 August, coming on as a 68th-minute substitute for Danny Welbeck in a 1–0 loss to Everton. Five days later, with his first shot for the club, he scored his first Manchester United goal, United's first in a 3–2 home victory over Fulham. On 2 September 2012, he scored his first hat-trick for United in another 3–2 victory over Southampton, helping pull United back from a 2–1 deficit; his third goal was his 100th in the Premier League. Van Persie netted a late penalty on 23 September to give United a 2–1 away win at Anfield against Liverpool, and opened his European account with the club, scoring a brace in the 2–1 away win against CFR Cluj, with both goals assisted by Wayne Rooney.

On 20 October, Van Persie scored United's second goal in a 4–2 win over Stoke City, opening up his body and guiding a cross into the far corner with his left foot. In the next Premier League game against Chelsea at Stamford Bridge, he scored his seventh goal in the league, with a sidefoot finish from Antonio Valencia's driven cross to put United 2–0 up. He also played a part in the first goal, firing a shot against the post that cannoned off David Luiz and into the net, in a 3–2 United win. On 3 November, he scored against his former club Arsenal in a 2–1 victory. This meant that he had scored against all 20 current Premier League clubs. On 9 December, Van Persie scored a last minute winner from a deflected free kick in a 3–2 victory over Manchester City, his Manchester derby debut. This goal ended City's unbeaten Premier League record in the 2012–13 season and also their unbeaten home record extending into the previous season.

After scoring against Everton on 10 February 2013, Van Persie went ten games without scoring, finally ending his barren run when he scored a penalty against Stoke on 14 April. Against Queens Park Rangers on 23 February, he had to be substituted after falling against a television camera and injuring a hip, but was fit for United's next match.

"Van Persie is the complete player. He has the entire package. He is a good footballer, but he scores loads of goals at the same time."

— Lionel Messi on Robin van Persie

On 22 April, he netted a first-half hat-trick against Aston Villa, confirming Manchester United's 20th league title with four games in hand. His second goal came from a Rooney pass from behind the halfway line, which he volleyed into the net from outside the box. Supporters of Manchester United voted Van Persie as the Sir Matt Busby Player of the Year for the 2012–13 season. Van Persie was nominated by UEFA into the ten-man shortlist for the 2012–13 Best Player in Europe award.

==== 2013–14 season ====
Van Persie kick-started his new campaign by scoring both of Manchester United's goals in their 2–0 win against Wigan Athletic in the Community Shield, securing David Moyes' first honour as club manager. He scored twice more in the first Premier League match of the season, against Swansea City, for the first of which "he chested it down and executed a crisp, instant scissor-kick into the net". On 19 March 2014, Van Persie scored a hat-trick in a 3–0 win over Greek side Olympiacos in the second leg of the Champions League second round to send United through to the quarter-finals 3–2 on aggregate.

==== 2014–15 season ====
Van Persie scored his first goal for the season in his fourth league appearance in a 5–3 defeat to Leicester City on 21 September 2014. He scored again in the next game against West Ham United, helping United win the game 2–1. On 26 October 2014, against Chelsea, Van Persie scored a late equaliser to earn a point for United. In the dying minutes of injury time, Marouane Fellaini's header from Ángel Di María's free-kick was saved by Thibaut Courtois, and Van Persie smashed in the rebound to equalise. Van Persie celebrated the goal by taking his shirt off and was booked for his actions. His goal celebration was also labelled "stupid" by United coach Louis van Gaal.

On 11 January 2015, he suffered an ankle injury in a 1–0 home defeat to Southampton. Following Manchester United's defeat to West Bromwich Albion, which saw Van Persie miss a penalty, he was stripped of his penalty-taking duties by Van Gaal.

=== Fenerbahçe ===
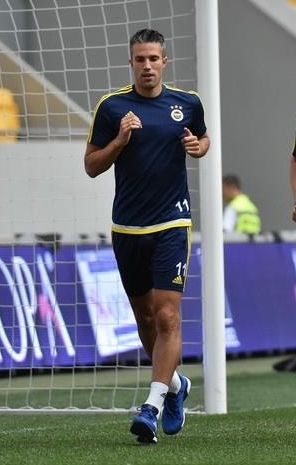
Van Persie warming up for Fenerbahçe before a match against Shakhtar Donetsk in 2015

On 14 July 2015, Van Persie joined Turkish side Fenerbahçe on a three-year deal for a fee claimed by Fenerbahçe to be £3.84 million. He was assigned the number 10 shirt. He and his former United teammate Nani debuted two weeks later in a goalless home draw against Shakhtar Donetsk in the third qualifying round of the season's Champions League, with Van Persie a 68th-minute substitute for Moussa Sow. His league debut came on 14 August as a 60th-minute substitute for Fernandão in a 2–0 win at Eskişehirspor. Six days later, he scored his first goal for his new club: as a late substitute for Sow, he headed the only goal away to Atromitos in the first leg of the Europa League play-offs, with his first of only two touches in the entire match. Van Persie scored his first domestic goal for the club on his first start on 23 August, finishing Nani's pass for the opening goal in a 1–1 draw at Çaykur Rizespor.

=== Return to Feyenoord ===
On 19 January 2018, Van Persie agreed to return to Feyenoord after cancelling his contract with Fenerbahçe. He made his first minutes since his return on 24 January 2018, as a substitute for Dylan Vente in a 1–1 draw against Utrecht in the Eredivisie. His first goal since his return followed on 8 February 2018, contributing to a 3–0 league win against Groningen. On 28 February, Van Persie scored his 300th career goal in a 3–0 victory against Willem II that put Feyenoord into the 2017–18 KNVB Cup final. He also scored in the final later on 22 April as Feyenoord defeated AZ 3–0 to claim their 13th trophy.

After the departure of Karim El Ahmadi, Van Persie was named Feyenoord's captain ahead of the 2018–19 season by head coach Giovanni van Bronckhorst. After goals against Excelsior and Heerenveen, he was named Eredivisie Player of the Month for his performances in August 2018. In October 2018, he announced he would retire from football at the end of the 2018–19 season. Van Persie became the oldest-ever player with two goals in De Klassieker on 27 January 2019, during a 6–2 wins against rivals Ajax. On 3 March 2019 he scored his first hat-trick in the Eredivisie in a 4–0 win against Emmen. On 12 May 2019, Van Persie played his last professional match as a footballer in a 2–0 home defeat against ADO Den Haag. He was replaced by Vente in the 93rd minute. Van Bronckhorst had previously confirmed that this would be Van Persie's last match, despite having one matchday left in that season's Eredivisie.

== International career ==
=== U21 career ===
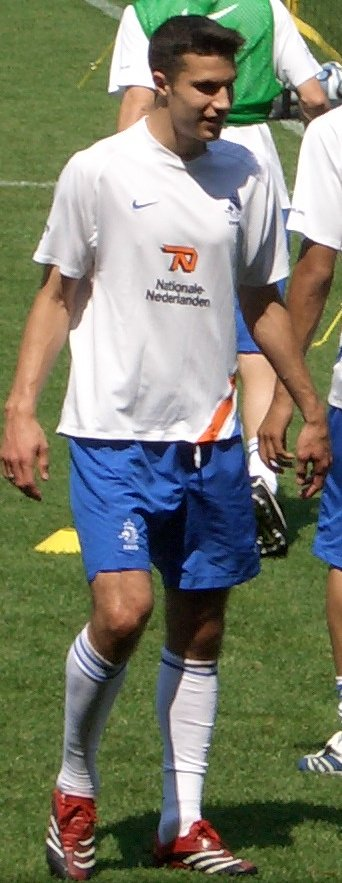
Van Persie training with the Netherlands in 2006

Van Persie was a U-21 international and took part in the 2004 and 2006 European Championship qualifying. Van Persie was used in a wider role as a left wing due to the preference of the experienced Klaas-Jan Huntelaar in the striker role. The Jong Oranje failed to qualify for the 2004 tournament and Van Persie did not participate in the latter as he was already in the senior squad for the FIFA World Cup. He earned his first caps for the Netherlands in less than the span of a week, first in a 2–0 2006 FIFA World Cup qualifying win over Romania on 4 June 2005, and in another qualifier four days later against Finland, which saw him pick up his first international goal in a 4–0 victory.

=== 2006 FIFA World Cup ===
Despite not being a regular starter for Arsenal, Van Persie was part of coach Marco van Basten's roster for the 2006 World Cup finals. He played in all four of the Netherlands' matches and scored his only goal in the group stage against Ivory Coast via a free kick as Oranje were eliminated in the Round of 16.

=== UEFA Euro 2008 ===
Van Persie scored a team-best four UEFA Euro 2008 qualifying goals, and was deployed as a winger behind lone striker Ruud van Nistelrooy during the tournament after Van Basten decided to change to a 4–2–3–1 formation. As Wesley Sneijder and Rafael van der Vaart were preferred in the midfield, Van Persie was left to battle with Arjen Robben for the remaining spot on the wing. On 13 June, he scored as a 55th-minute substitute in a 4–1 Group C victory over 2006 World Cup finalists France, and started the next match against Romania, scoring off a pass from Demy de Zeeuw with an excellent volley into the back of the net. He finished with two goals as the Netherlands finished atop their group but again suffered a first knock-out round, second-stage elimination.

=== 2010 FIFA World Cup ===
In the 2010 World Cup qualifying process, the Netherlands graduated from Group 9 with a 100% record.

Van Persie was included in the preliminary squad for the 2010 FIFA World Cup in South Africa. On 27 May 2010, Netherlands manager Bert van Marwijk announced that he was in the final squad of 23 participating in the competition.

Van Persie was in the starting line-up for their first match in the competition, a 2–0 victory over Denmark. On 24 June, he scored the first goal against Cameroon in a 2–1 win to ensure that the Netherlands finished as group winners, and was officially named the man of the match. He started every match for Oranje, though he did not increase his goal tally in the following matches. Oranje reached the 2010 World Cup Final, in which he was on the losing side due to Andrés Iniesta's extra time goal.

=== UEFA Euro 2012 ===
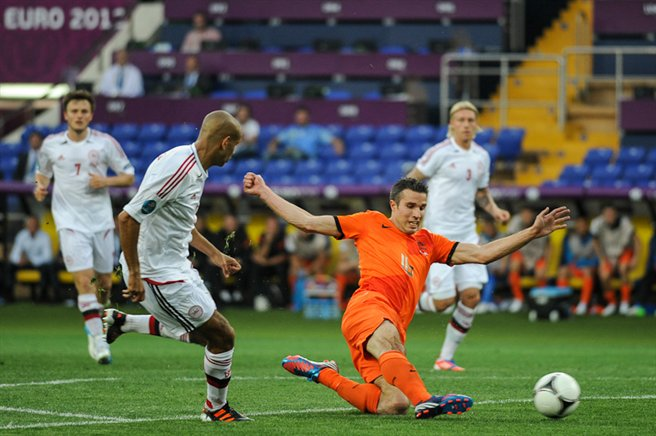
Van Persie attempting a shot against Denmark at UEFA Euro 2012

On 2 September 2011, Van Persie scored four goals in a record-breaking 11–0 victory in UEFA Euro 2012 qualifying Group E over San Marino. He entered the Dutch national team's top 10 all-time topscorer ranking with a tally of 25 goals, dislodging Marco van Basten in the process. Van Persie had not scored four goals in a single match for a long while. Van Persie contributed six goals in total during qualifying.

On 13 June 2012, Van Persie scored the Dutch goal in a 2–1 loss to Germany in the European Championship group stage. Having missed two earlier chances, he picked up the ball near the halfway line, turned and ran at the German defence, before firing into the bottom corner from the edge of the penalty area. The Netherlands lost all three group games at the tournament.

=== 2014 FIFA World Cup ===
Van Persie ended the 2014 FIFA World Cup qualification campaign as top scorer in the UEFA section with 11 goals. In June 2013, he was appointed captain of the Dutch national team by manager Louis van Gaal. On 11 October 2013, he became the Netherlands' top goalscorer of all time in an 8–1 defeat of Hungary, the Dutch's penultimate Group D match, where he scored a hat-trick. This put him on 41 goals in 80 internationals, surpassing the record previously held by Patrick Kluivert.

In the team's opening match of the 2014 FIFA World Cup, Van Persie captained the Netherlands to a 5–1 win over champions Spain in Salvador. He scored twice in the match, one of which was a flying header which was later nominated for FIFA Puskás Award for the most beautiful goal of the year. He was also named man of the match by FIFA. Ruud Gullit wrote about this goal: "That flying header over Iker Casillas reverberated around the world. It was sensational." On 18 June, he scored his third goal of the tournament in a 3–2 defeat of Australia, a result that qualified the Netherlands to the knockout stage with one group match remaining.

In the quarter-final, Van Persie scored the Netherlands' first kick in a 4–3 penalty shootout defeat of Costa Rica. He scored his fourth goal of the tournament from a penalty kick in a 3–0 win against Brazil in the third-place play-off. Van Persie was the only player since 1966 in World Cup history to score with his left foot, right foot, and head, as well as scoring from a free kick and a penalty kick.

=== UEFA Euro 2016 qualifiers and retirement ===
On 28 August 2015, Van Persie was replaced by Arjen Robben as captain of the national team. He replaced Huntelaar for the final three minutes of a 2–1 away win over Kazakhstan in UEFA Euro 2016 qualifying on 10 October, his 100th appearance for the Netherlands. In doing so, Van Persie became the eighth Dutchman to reach the milestone. Three days later, in their final group game, Van Persie came on as a 38th-minute substitute for Jaïro Riedewald at home against the Czech Republic and scored an own goal which handed the Czechs victory, despite scoring later on in a 3–2 defeat. The result meant that the Dutch did not qualify for an international tournament for the first time since 2002. His last cap for the Netherlands came in 2017 against France in the 2018 FIFA World Cup qualifiers, coming on as a substitute.

== Managerial career ==
=== Early career ===
In May 2020, a year after his retirement, Van Persie became an assistant-coach to Dick Advocaat at his former club Feyenoord, where he would help train the club's strikers in an unofficial role. In May 2021, Feyenoord announced that Van Persie would officially join the club from the start of the 2021–22 season in a supporting role as a field coach, while also becoming the co-head coach at the club's under-16 team. For the 2023–24 season, Van Persie was promoted to co-head coach of the club's under-18 team, as well as the under-19 team in the UEFA Youth League. Feyenoord under-18 won the 2023 Mladen Ramljak Memorial Tournament with him as a coach. In the UEFA Youth League, Feyenoord topped a group of Atlético Madrid, Lazio and Celtic, before getting knocked out by Bayern Munich in the round of 16.

=== Heerenveen ===
On 17 May 2024, Dutch side Heerenveen announced that Van Persie would be their head coach from the 2024–25 season onwards by signing a two-year contract. In his first game as head coach in professional football, Heerenveen lost 1–0 to Ajax as Van Persie became Heerenveen's youngest-ever manager in the Eredivisie at an age of 41 on 11 August 2024. In his fourth game in charge, Heerenveen suffered a league record 9–1 defeat away to AZ on 14 September. Van Persie was criticised after subbing on goalkeeper Andries Noppert with a 2–1 lead against amateur side Quick Boys in the KNVB Cup round of 16, before Noppert caused a penalty and Heerenveen lost in extra-time. Van Persie won 9 out of 26 games in all competitions during his term at Heerenveen, leaving the club in ninth position in the Eredivisie at the time of his departure.

=== Feyenoord ===
On 23 February 2025, Feyenoord announced that Van Persie would be returning to the club as head coach, signing with the club from Heerenveen until the end of the 2026–27 season. Van Persie replaced Brian Priske, who was sacked two weeks earlier, and would be assisted by René Hake, Etiënne Reijnen and John de Wolf. Van Persie's first match in charge of Feyenoord finished in a goalless Eredivisie draw against NEC on 1 March 2025. Four days later, he made his UEFA Champions League debut as a manager in a 0–2 defeat to Inter Milan in the round of 16. Feyenoord were knocked out from the tournament with a 2–1 defeat at San Siro six days later. Van Persie's first win in charge of Feyenoord followed in the league game against Twente on 16 March 2025 (2–6), before recording his first home win in charge of Feyenoord in the league game against Go Ahead Eagles two weeks later (3–2). With five consecutive wins following, Van Persie earned 22 points and a goal difference of +18 in his first eight league games in charge, becoming the best-starting Feyenoord manager in the Eredivisie since Ernst Happel in 1969. He eventually led Feyenoord to third place in the Eredivisie in the remainder of the 2024–25 season, qualifying for the UEFA Champions League qualifiers.

On 12 August 2025, Feyenoord were knocked out of the UEFA Champions League qualifiers with an away defeat to Fenerbahçe (5–2), having won the first leg 2–1. After Feyenoord won all of their three league games in August 2025, against NAC Breda, Excelsior and Sparta Rotterdam, Van Persie was named the first Rinus Michels Manager of the Month in the Eredivisie. Feyenoord led the league in the first months of the season. However, Feyenoord struggled since November, as they picked up just 11 points in 10 league games and were knocked out of the KNVB Cup second round by Heerenveen and of the UEFA Europa League league phase with six defeats. Van Persie was criticized by his own player Quinten Timber for not protecting his players. On 18 March 2026, Dick Advocaat was appointed as an advisor for the club, with special emphasis on supporting Van Persie. Feyenoord eventually finished the season in second place, qualifying for the 2026–27 UEFA Champions League; however, Van Persie was dismissed in June 2026 after 16 months at the club.

== Personal life ==
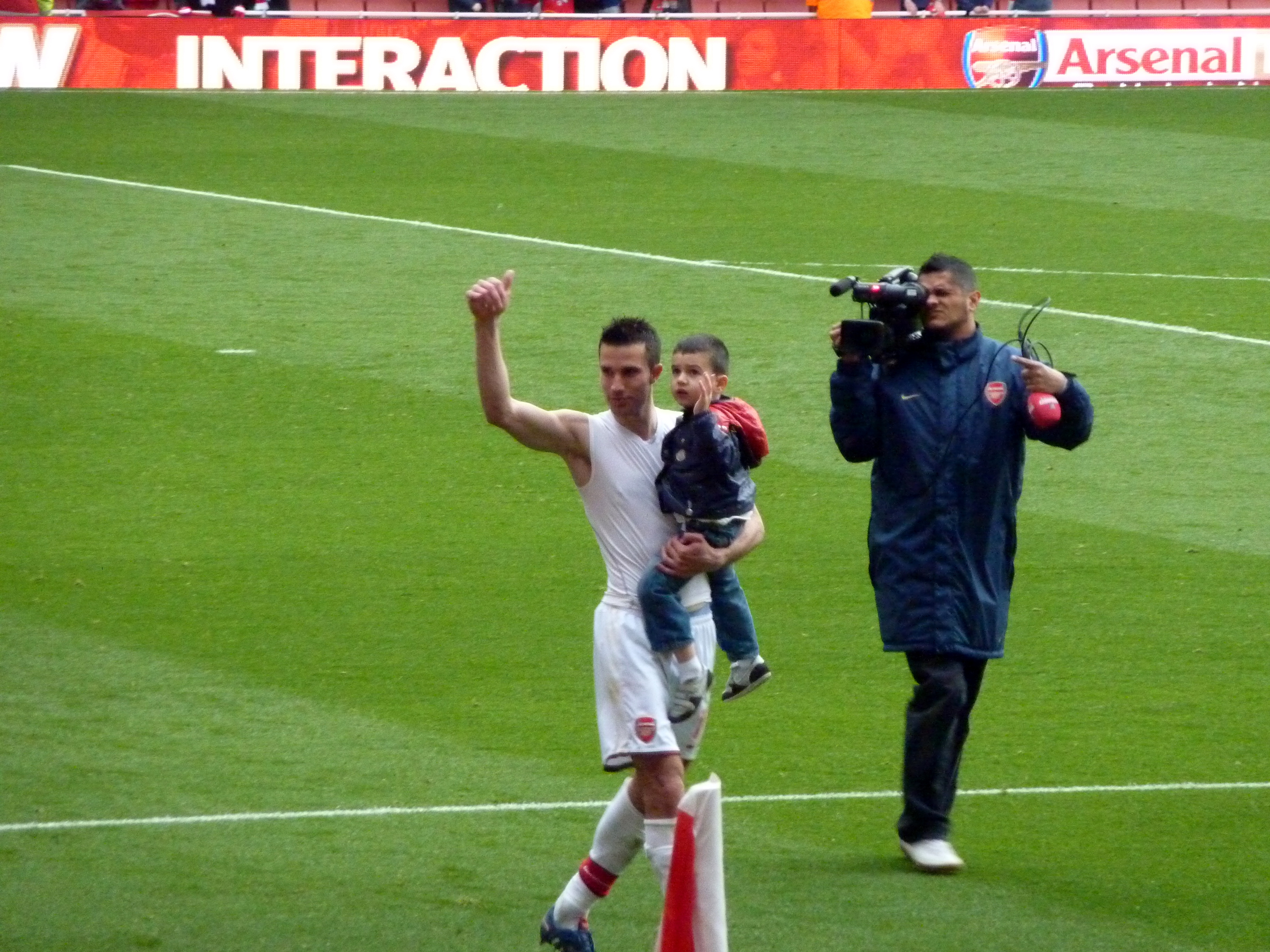
Van Persie holding his toddler son, Shaqueel, in 2010

Van Persie was born in Rotterdam to an artistic family. His mother, José Ras, is a painter and jewellery designer who also teaches children with special needs. His father, Bob, is a sculptor. After Van Persie's parents divorced he was brought up by his father. At school, Van Persie had serious problems with his behaviour and was excluded from class almost daily.

After joining Arsenal in England, Van Persie settled in Hampstead, an affluent suburb of north London. Van Persie is married to Bouchra (née Elbali), who is Dutch-Moroccan, and the couple have two children, a son named Shaqueel, born in 2006, and daughter Dina, born in 2009. When asked if this caused him to convert to Islam, Van Persie said: "It's not true. I am not a Muslim, nor a Christian or a Jew. I have been raised liberally. If you want to become a Muslim it should come from the heart. I would not do it just to please my wife. To believe for me is a quest for being a good man."

== Style of play ==
"Robin van Persie's such an amazing footballer. He hardly needs any space or time to become dangerous."

— Bert van Marwijk

Van Persie started his senior club career as a left winger and possessed an exceptional ball control and was also a talented striker of the ball. He was bought by Arsenal as a long-term replacement for Dennis Bergkamp. Manager Arsène Wenger planned to convert Van Persie from a left winger to a central forward as he had successfully done with star player Thierry Henry. He was at first mostly deployed as a supporting forward in League Cup and FA Cup matches. Due to the retirement of Bergkamp and departure of Freddie Ljungberg, Van Persie was given a starting role to play alongside Henry as a second striker upfront.

The departure of Emmanuel Adebayor and Henry meant the Dutchman was now the main striker in Wenger's 4–3–3 system and very successfully played further upfront as a pure striker, winning the Premier League Golden Boot twice in a row. Van Persie is also a set piece specialist and a vast number of his assists come from both corners and freekicks. He is also a proven direct freekick taker scoring regularly for his club and country. He was also occasionally deployed as a false-9 throughout his career, seemingly as a centre-forward, but given the freedom to drop deep.

== Sponsorship ==
Van Persie has a sponsorship deal with German sportswear and equipment supplier, Adidas. Having previously worn Adidas Predator football boots he made the transition to the Adidas F50 adiZero boots in 2013.

== Career statistics ==
=== Club ===
Appearances and goals by club, season and competition
Club	Season	League			National cup (Note: Includes KNVB Cup, FA Cup, Turkish Cup)		League cup (Note: Includes Football League Cup)		Europe		Other		Total	
Club	Season	Division	Apps	Goals	Apps	Goals	Apps	Goals	Apps	Goals	Apps	Goals	Apps	Goals
Feyenoord	2001–02	Eredivisie	10	0	0	0	—		7 (Note: Appearances in UEFA Champions League, appearances in UEFA Cup)	0	—		17	0
Feyenoord	2002–03	Eredivisie	23	8	3	7	—		2 (Note: Appearances in UEFA Champions League)	0	—		28	15
Feyenoord	2003–04	Eredivisie	28	6	2	0	—		3 (Note: Appearances in UEFA Cup)	0	—		33	6
Feyenoord	Total		61	14	5	7	—		12	0	—		78	21
Arsenal	2004–05	Premier League	26	5	5	3	3	1	6	1	1 (Note: Appearance in FA Community Shield)	0	41	10
Arsenal	2005–06	Premier League	24	5	2	0	4	4	7	2	1	0	38	11
Arsenal	2006–07	Premier League	22	11	1	0	0	0	8	2	—		31	13
Arsenal	2007–08	Premier League	15	7	0	0	1	0	7	2	—		23	9
Arsenal	2008–09	Premier League	28	11	6	4	0	0	10	5	—		44	20
Arsenal	2009–10	Premier League	16	9	0	0	0	0	4	1	—		20	10
Arsenal	2010–11	Premier League	25	18	2	1	3	1	3	2	—		33	22
Arsenal	2011–12	Premier League	38	30	2	2	0	0	8	5	—		48	37
Arsenal	Total		194	96	18	10	11	6	53	20	2	0	278	132
Manchester United	2012–13	Premier League	38	26	4	1	0	0	6	3	—		48	30
Manchester United	2013–14	Premier League	21	12	0	0	0	0	6	4	1	2	28	18
Manchester United	2014–15	Premier League	27	10	2	0	0	0	—		—		29	10
Manchester United	Total		86	48	6	1	0	0	12	7	1	2	105	58
Fenerbahçe	2015–16	Süper Lig	31	16	5	5	—		12 (Note: One appearance in UEFA Champions League, eleven appearances and one goal in UEFA Europa League)	1	—		48	22
Fenerbahçe	2016–17	Süper Lig	24	9	4	4	—		7 (Note: Appearance(s) in UEFA Europa League)	1	—		35	14
Fenerbahçe	2017–18	Süper Lig	2	0	0	0	—		2	0	—		4	0
Fenerbahçe	Total		57	25	9	9	—		21	2	—|		87	36
Feyenoord	2017–18	Eredivisie	12	5	2	2	—		—		—		14	7
Feyenoord	2018–19	Eredivisie	25	16	4	2	—		1	0	1 (Note: Appearance in Johan Cruyff Shield)	0	31	18
Feyenoord	Total		37	21	6	4	—		1	0	1	0	45	25
Career total			435	204	44	31	11	6	99	29	4	2	593	272

=== International ===
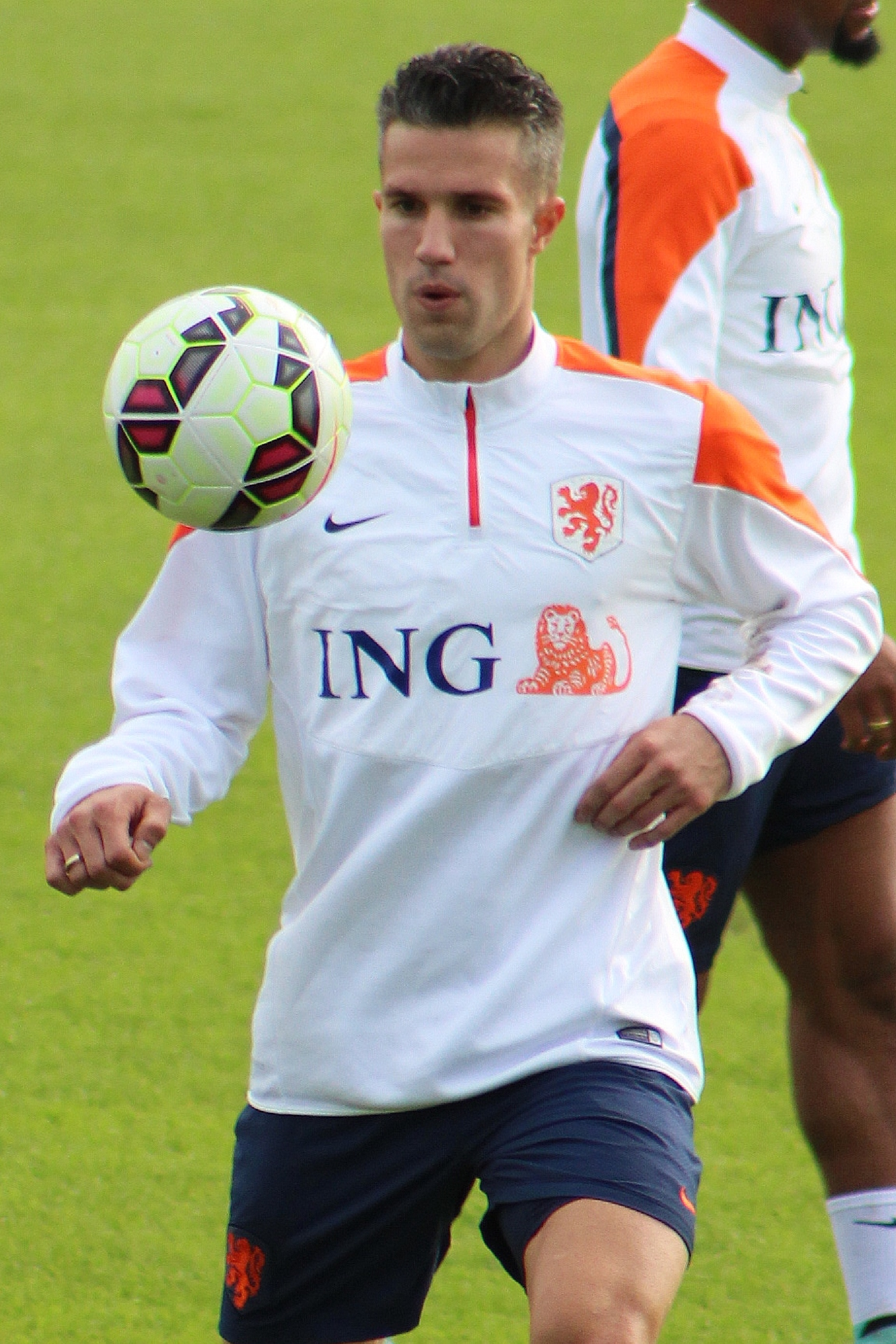
Van Persie training with the Netherlands in 2014

Appearances and goals by national team and year
National team	Year	Apps	Goals
Netherlands	2005	7	1
Netherlands	2006	12	6
Netherlands	2007	4	0
Netherlands	2008	10	5
Netherlands	2009	8	2
Netherlands	2010	11	5
Netherlands	2011	9	6
Netherlands	2012	10	6
Netherlands	2013	10	10
Netherlands	2014	15	8
Netherlands	2015	5	1
Netherlands	2016	0	0
Netherlands	2017	1	0
Total		102	50

=== Managerial ===
As of match played 17 May 2026

Managerial record by team and tenure
Team	From	To	Record								Ref.
Team	From	To	M	W	D	L	GF	GA	GD	Win %	Ref.
Heerenveen	1 July 2024	23 February 2025	26	9	6	11	33	47	−14	34.62	
Feyenoord	23 February 2025	7 June 2026	58	30	9	19	116	83	+33	51.72	
Total			84	39	15	30	149	130	+19	46.43	

== Honours ==
=== Player ===
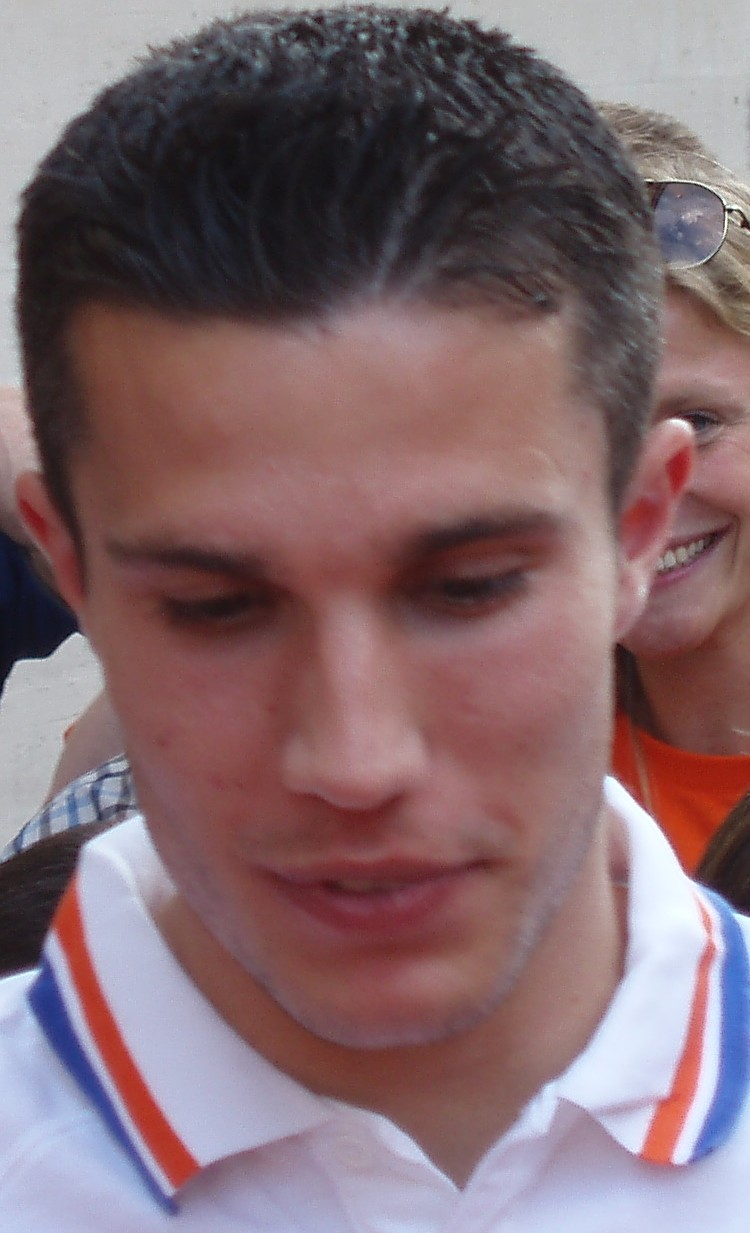
With the Netherlands, Van Persie reached the final of the 2010 FIFA World Cup.

Feyenoord

- KNVB Cup: 2017–18; runner-up: 2002–03
- Johan Cruyff Shield: 2018
- UEFA Cup: 2001–02

Arsenal

- FA Cup: 2004–05
- FA Community Shield: 2004
- Football League Cup runner-up: 2010–11
- UEFA Champions League runner-up: 2005–06

Manchester United

- Premier League: 2012–13
- FA Community Shield: 2013

Fenerbahçe

- Turkish Cup runner-up: 2015–16

Netherlands

- FIFA World Cup runner-up: 2010; third place: 2014

Individual

- Dutch Football Talent of the Year: 2001–02
- KNVB Best Young Talent Award: 2001–02
- Premier League Player of the Month: November 2005, October 2009, October 2011, December 2012, April 2013
- BBC Goal of the Month: September 2006, December 2008, December 2011, August 2012, April 2013, August 2013
- Most assists in the Premier League: 2008–09 (shared)
- Premier League Golden Boot Landmark Award: 2011–12 (10 goals), 2011–12 (20 goals), 2011–12 (30 goals)
- Premier League Golden Boot: 2011–12, 2012–13
- PFA Players' Player of the Year: 2011–12
- PFA Fans' Player of the Year: 2012
- PFA Team of the Year: 2011–12 Premier League, 2012–13 Premier League
- FWA Footballer of the Year: 2011–12
- ESM Team of the Year: 2011–12
- Arsenal Player of the Season: 2008–09, 2011–12
- Sir Matt Busby Player of the Year: 2012–13
- BBC Goal of the Season: 2012–13
- Premier League 100 Club's Greatest Goal Award
- Manchester United Goal of the Season: 2012–13 (vs. Aston Villa, 22 April 2013)
- 2014 FIFA World Cup qualification top goalscorer (11 goals) (shared)
- Sport in Beeld-Prijs (Dutch Sports Gala) – Moment of the Year: 2014
- Eredivisie Player of the Month: August 2018
- Telegraaf Footballer of the Year Gala 2019: Oeuvreprijs (Lifetime Achievement)

=== Manager ===
Individual

- Eredivisie Manager of the Month: August 2025

== Records ==
=== Arsenal ===
- Most goals in a 38-game league season: 30 goals (in the Premier League, 2011–12)
- Most goals in a calendar year (35), 2011–12
- Most goals scored at the Emirates Stadium: (64)

=== Manchester United ===
- Only player to score two 90th-minute winning goals in the Premier League (shared with two players) 2012–13

=== Feyenoord ===
- The oldest player in Eredivisie history with two goals in a Klassieker (35 years, 174 days).

=== Premier League ===
- Most Premier League goals scored from the turn of the year to the end of the season (18) 2010–11 (shared with Thierry Henry and Cristiano Ronaldo)
- Number of teams scored against in a season: 17, joint record:
  - 20-team league:
    - Ian Wright (Arsenal, 1996–97)
    - Robin van Persie (Arsenal, 2011–12)
    - Mohamed Salah (Liverpool, 2017–18)
- Most consecutive away league matches scored in: 9, Robin van Persie (for Arsenal, 1 January 2011 to 22 May 2011)
- Highest goal-scoring Dutch player in Premier League (144 goals)

=== International ===
- 2014 FIFA World Cup – Only player since 1966 to score with his left foot, right foot, and head, as well as scoring from a free kick and a penalty kick.
- Netherlands national football team all-time top scorer (50)

== See also ==
- List of men's association football players with 50 or more international goals
- List of footballers with 100 or more caps
- List of FIFA World Cup top goalscorers
