= Jeroen Ketting =

Dutch footballer

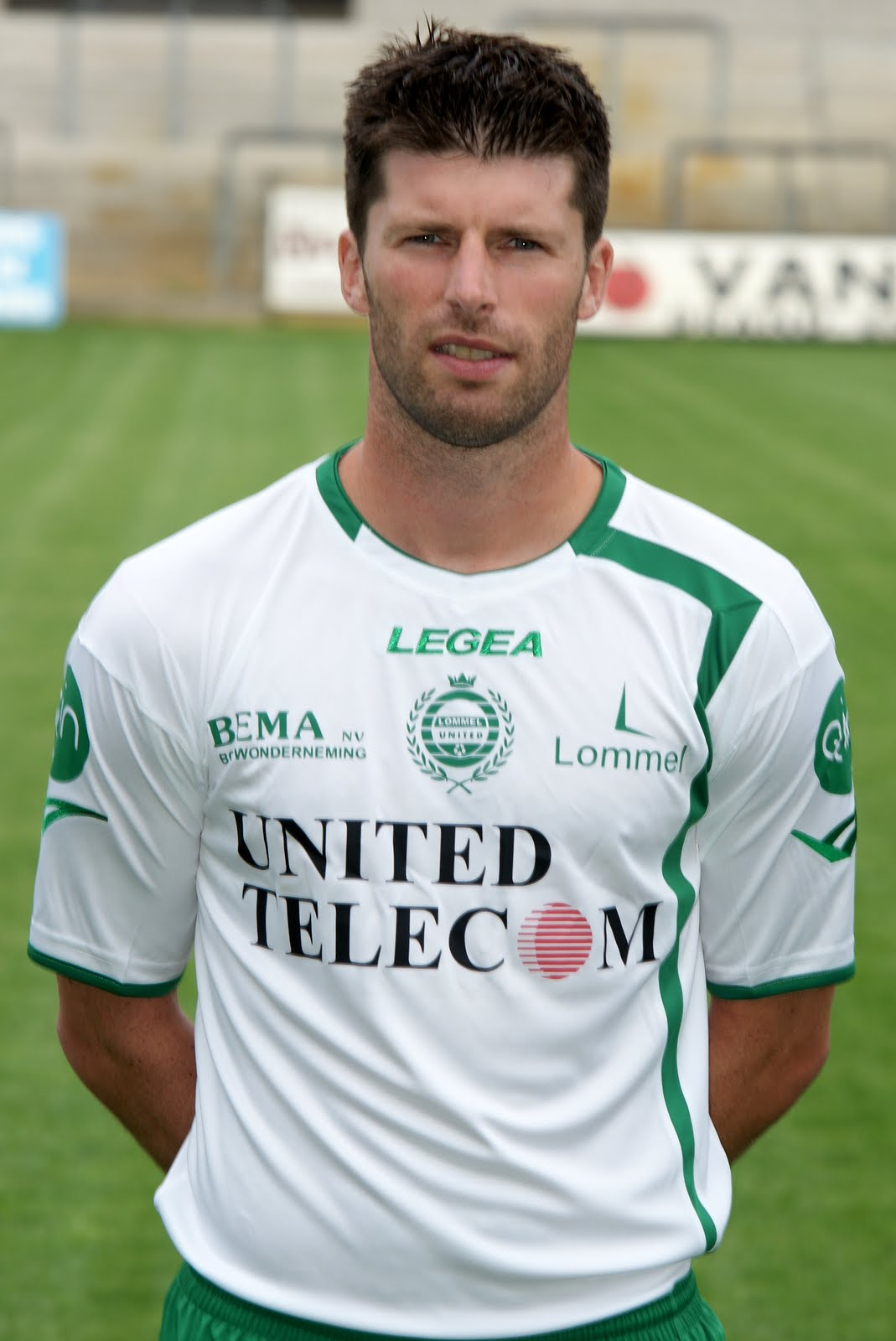
- Ketting with Lommel United in 2010

Personal information
- Full name: Jeroen Ketting
- Date of birth: 10 November 1980 (age 45)
- Place of birth: Haarlem, Netherlands
- Height: 1.81 m (5 ft 11 1/2 in)
- Position: Striker

Youth career
- Ajax

Senior career*
| Years | Team | Apps | (Gls) |
| 2002 | AZ | 1 | (1) |
| 2002–2004 | Haarlem | 60 | (24) |
| 2004–2006 | FC Volendam | 51 | (14) |
| 2006–2008 | SC Cambuur | 52 | (14) |
| 2008 | → Haarlem (loan) | 10 | (1) |
| 2008–2011 | Lommel United | 94 | (53) |
| 2011–2012 | PEC Zwolle | 2 | (1) |
- * Club domestic league appearances and goals as of 10 August 2012 (UTC)

Jeroen Ketting (born 10 November 1980) is a former Dutch professional footballer who last played as a striker for PEC Zwolle in the Dutch Eredivisie. He formerly played for Haarlem, FC Volendam, SC Cambuur and Lommel United.
