= Pieter Collen =

Belgian footballer

Personal information
- Date of birth: 20 June 1980 (age 46)
- Place of birth: Ghent, Belgium
- Height: 1.83 m (6 ft 0 in)
- Position: Centre back

Youth career
- Gent

Senior career*
Years	Team	Apps	(Gls)
1997–1999	Gent	35	(2)
1999–2000	Vitesse Arnhem	0	(0)
2000–2001	N.E.C.	42	(2)
2001–2007	Feyenoord	14	(2)
2003–2005	→ NAC Breda (loan)	52	(0)
2008	Sint-Truidense	16	(0)
2009	Cambuur	6	(0)
2009–2010	Beveren	16	(0)
2010	Brisbane Roar	5	(0)
Total		186	(6)

International career
2006	Belgium	2	(0)
- * Club domestic league appearances and goals

Pieter Collen (born 20 June 1980) is a Belgian former professional footballer who played as a centre-back. He made two appearances for the Belgium national team.

== Club career ==
Collen started his professional career in his hometown with Gent. He defended the white and blue colours for two seasons before moving to the Netherlands. He ended up with Vitesse but never broke through and he left for rivals NEC the same year. In Nijmegen he forced himself into the starting eleven and made a huge impact in his second season with NEC. Feyenoord was interested in his abilities and signed for the club in Rotterdam.

Once he arrived in Rotterdam Collen started on the bench. Due to good play in training, he forced himself into the squad and played many good matches in the Dutch top flight as well as in the UEFA Champions League. However, a string of injuries and a long period of rehabilitation caused him to be sidelined until the end of the 2002 season. He was part of the Feyenoord squad that won the 2001–02 UEFA Cup, as an unused substitute in the final. When he was declared suitable to play again he was loaned out to NAC Breda but suffered another a season-long injury and returned to Feyenoord.

The turning point came halfway through the 2003–04 season when he was loaned out to NAC Breda again, where he played 51 matches in one-and-a-half seasons. Feyenoord recalled him but, with Erwin Koeman as coach, he hardly played, partly due to injuries. When February arrived he started to play regularly again and was man of the match on several occasions. In the 2007–08 season he fell out of first-team contention and only appeared for the Feyenoord reserves. In the January transfer window, he returned to his homeland, signing with Sint-Truiden until 2010. However, his contract was annulled at the end of the next season.

To maintain his physical fitness he trained with NEC in the first half of the 2008–09 season. In the second half, he provided his services to amateur outfit SC Cambuur. After failing to earn a longer contract with the club he continued his career in the Exqi League.

On 11 January 2010, he signed for Brisbane Roar in the Australian A-League for the remainder of the season, replacing former captain Craig Moore. It was announced on 6 May that he had not been offered a new contract for the next season despite earlier indications that he would be retained by the club.
