= Ferry de Haan =

Dutch footballer and general manager

Personal information
- Date of birth: 12 September 1972 (age 54)
- Place of birth: Capelle aan den IJssel, Netherlands
- Height: 1.91 m (6 ft 3 in)
- Position: Centre-back

Team information
- Current team: Heerenveen (General manager)

Youth career
- Transvalia ZW
- Feyenoord

Senior career*
Years	Team	Apps	(Gls)
1996–1998	Excelsior	65	(13)
1998–2002	Feyenoord	77	(0)
2002–2005	Excelsior	37	(0)
Total		179	(13)
- * Club domestic league appearances and goals

Ferry de Haan (born 12 September 1972) is a Dutch retiredfootballer, who was the general manager of Excelsior from 2012 to 2021. He currently works in the same position at Heerenveen.

== Playing career ==
De Haan was born in Capelle aan den IJssel. He played club football for Excelsior and Feyenoord. He won the 1998–99 Eredivisie title with Feyenoord, and was a late substitute in the 2002 UEFA Cup Final, in which Feyenoord beat Borussia Dortmund. After an injury hit season with Excelsior in 2006, he planned to retire but in the end decided otherwise and remained with the club for his final season.

== Executive career ==
De Haan worked as general manager at Excelsior but joined Heerenveen in 2021 as technical manager and became the club's general manager in 2023.

== Honours ==
Feyenoord

- Eredivisie: 1998–99
- UEFA Cup: 2001-02
