= Rastislav Michalík =

Slovak footballer (born 1974)

Personal information
- Date of birth: 14 January 1974 (age 52)
- Place of birth: Staškov, Czechoslovakia
- Height: 1.83 m (6 ft 0 in)
- Position: Midfielder

Youth career
- ZZO Čadca
- FK Považská Bystrica

Senior career*
| Years | Team | Apps | (Gls) |
| 1993–1994 | Banská Bystrica | 4 | (0) |
| 1995–1996 | Třinec | 41 | (3) |
| 1997 | Příbram | 25 | (2) |
| 1998–2001 | Slovan Liberec | 85 | (6) |
| 2001–2005 | Sparta Prague | 86 | (1) |
| 2005 | Kayserispor | 3 | (0) |
| 2005–2007 | SV Ried | 29 | (1) |
| 2007–2008 | Spartak Trnava | 18 | (2) |
| 2008–2011 | Čadca | | |
| 2011–2017 | FK Slávia Staškov | | |

International career
| 2002–2005 | Slovakia | 21 | (0) |
- * Club domestic league appearances and goals

Rastislav Michalík (born 14 January 1974) is a Slovak former professional footballer who played as a midfielder.

Michalík moved in 1995 to the Czech Republic to play for FK Fotbal Třinec. He gradually progressed and played for Slovan Liberec and Sparta Prague in the Czech First League. In 2003, he won the Czech championship with Sparta. In 2005 Michalík moved briefly to Turkey and played also in Austria before moving back to Slovakia in 2007. He later played for FK Slávia Staškov in Slovak lower division.

== Honours ==
Slovan Liberec

- Czech Cup: 1999–2000
