= Tomasz Rząsa =

Polish association footballer

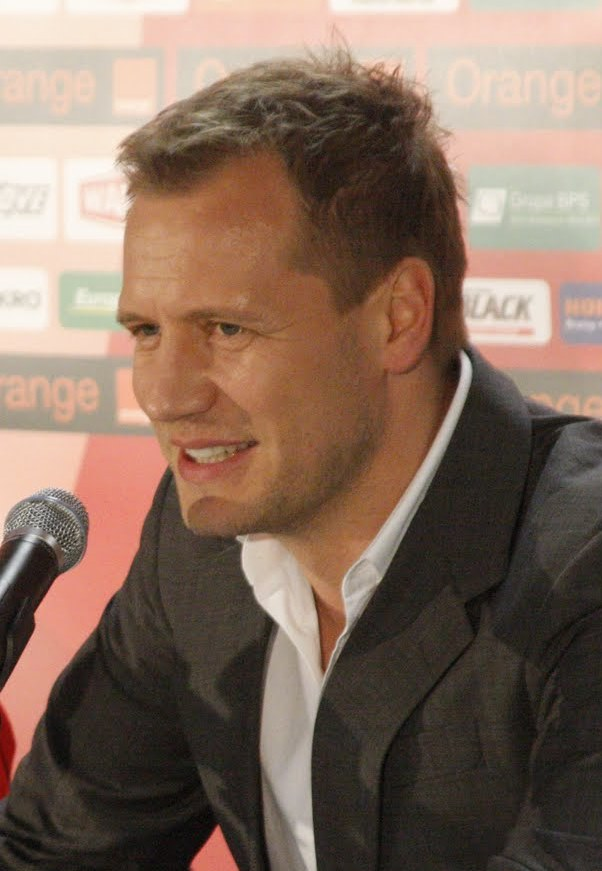
- Rząsa in 2011

Personal information
- Full name: Tomasz Rząsa
- Date of birth: 11 March 1973 (age 53)
- Place of birth: Kraków, Poland
- Height: 1.80 m (5 ft 11 in)
- Positions: Defender; midfielder

Team information
- Current team: Lech Poznań (sporting director)

Youth career
- 1986–1988: Cracovia

Senior career*
Years	Team	Apps	(Gls)
1988–1991	Cracovia	25	(4)
1992–1994	Sokół Pniewy	66	(25)
1995	Grasshoppers	21	(5)
1996	Lugano	9	(2)
1996	Grasshoppers	9	(1)
1997	Young Boys	12	(6)
1997–1999	De Graafschap	50	(4)
1999–2003	Feyenoord	90	(1)
2003–2004	Partizan	18	(0)
2004–2005	Heerenveen	23	(0)
2005–2006	ADO Den Haag	25	(0)
2006–2008	Ried	58	(0)
Total		408	(48)

International career
1994–2006	Poland	36	(1)
- * Club domestic league appearances and goals

Tomasz Mariusz Rząsa (Polish pronunciation: [ˈtɔmaʂ ˈʐɔ̃sa]; born 11 March 1973) is a Polish former professional footballer who primarily played as a left-back and sometimes as a left midfielder. He currently serves as the sporting director of Ekstraklasa club Lech Poznań.

== Club career ==
Rząsa played for several clubs during his career, including Cracovia and Sokół Pniewy in Poland, Grasshopper, Lugano, and Young Boys in Switzerland, De Graafschap, Feyenoord, and Heerenveen and ADO Den Haag in the Netherlands, Partizan in Serbia, and Ried in Austria.

While playing for Grasshopper, he won the Swiss National League twice, in the 1994–95 and 1995–96 seasons.

Rząsa played for Feyenoord from 1999 to 2003. Although he did not win any domestic titles during this period, he won the 2001–02 UEFA Cup after Feyenoord defeated Borussia Dortmund in the final. As a result, he participated in the 2002 UEFA Super Cup, where Feyenoord lost to Real Madrid. Rząsa played in both finals.

At Partizan, he joined as one of several new signings alongside players such as Ljubinko Drulović and Taribo West, and helped the club qualify for the UEFA Champions League group stage.

In 2006, he moved to Austria and signed for Ried. He played an important role in Ried's best-ever finish, as the club finished runners-up in the Austrian Bundesliga in the 2006–07 season. Rząsa made 58 league appearances for Ried over two seasons.

== International career ==
Rząsa made 36 appearances for the Poland national team between 1994 and 2006, scoring one goal.

He was selected as a member of Poland's squad for the 2002 FIFA World Cup. He did not play in the opening group-stage match against South Korea or the third match against the United States, but came on as a substitute for Michał Żewłakow in the 71st minute of the second match against Portugal. Rząsa played for approximately 20 minutes, but Poland lost 4–0 to Portugal.

Poland finished the group stage with one win and two losses and failed to advance to the round of 16. Rząsa likewise made only one appearance at the tournament, in the match against Portugal.

== Coaching career ==
Upon finishing his playing career, he was an assistant manager at Lech Poznań under Maciej Skorża during the 2014–15 season, and under Rafał Ulatowski in May 2018.

== Career statistics ==
=== International ===
Appearances and goals by national team and year
National team	Year	Apps	Goals
Poland
Poland	1994	1	1
Poland	2000	5	0
Poland	2002	5	0
Poland	2003	3	0
Poland	2004	10	0
Poland	2005	10	0
Poland	2006	2	0
Total		36	1

Scores and results list Poland's goal tally first, score column indicates score after each Rząsa goal.

List of international goals scored by Tomasz Rząsa
No.	Date	Venue	Opponent	Score	Result	Competition
1	10 December 1994	Prince Faisal bin Fahd Stadium, Riyadh, Saudi Arabia	Saudi Arabia	2–1	2–1	Friendly

== Honours ==
Grasshoppers

- Swiss Super League: 1995–96, 1996–97

Feyenoord

- Johan Cruijff Shield: 1999
- UEFA Cup: 2001–02
