= 2007–08 PSV Eindhoven season =

PSV Eindhoven
2007–08 season
- Head coach: Ronald Koeman (until 5 November); Jan Wouters (caretaker); Sef Vergoossen (caretaker)
- Stadium: Philips Stadion
- Eredivisie: 1st
- KNVB Cup: Second round
- Johan Cruyff Shield: Runners-up
- Champions League: Group stage
- UEFA Cup: Quarter-finals
- Top goalscorer: Danny Koevermans (14)
Home colours	Away colours	Third colours

During the 2007–08 Dutch football season, PSV Eindhoven competed in the Eredivisie.

== Season summary ==
The 2007–08 season was a turbulent one for PSV. Ronald Koeman left in early November to take charge at Valencia. Jan Wouters took charge as caretaker for the next month, before Sef Vergoossen was appointed interim manager for the rest of the season. Vergoossen guided the club to the UEFA Cup quarter-finals and won PSV's fourth successive Dutch title before stepping down at the end of the season.

PSV were disqualified from the KNVB Cup after fielding Manuel da Costa, who was suspended.

== Kit ==
PSV's kits were manufactured by Nike and sponsored by Philips.

== First-team squad ==
Squad at end of season

Note: Flags indicate national team as defined under FIFA eligibility rules; some limited exceptions apply. Players may hold more than one non-FIFA nationality.

No.	Pos.	Nation	Player
1	GK	(Brazil) BRA	Heurelho Gomes
2	DF	(Netherlands) NED	Jan Kromkamp
3	DF	(Mexico) MEX	Carlos Salcido
5	DF	(Netherlands) NED	Mike Zonneveld
6	MF	(Belgium) BEL	Timmy Simons (captain)
7	MF	(Finland) FIN	Mika Väyrynen
8	MF	(Ecuador) ECU	Édison Méndez
9	FW	(Serbia) SRB	Danko Lazović
10	FW	(Netherlands) NED	Danny Koevermans
13	DF	(Brazil) BRA	Alcides (on loan from Chelsea)
14	DF	(Serbia) SRB	Slobodan Rajković (on loan from Chelsea)
15	MF	(Australia) AUS	Jason Culina
16	MF	(Netherlands) NED	Ismaïl Aissati (Note: Aissati was born in Utrecht, Netherlands, and represented them at U-21 level, but also qualified to represent Morocco internationally through his parents and would make his international debut for Morocco in August 2011.)
17	FW	(Peru) PER	Jefferson Farfán
18	DF	(Ghana) GHA	Eric Addo
19	FW	(Brazil) BRA	Jonathan Reis
20	MF	(Netherlands) NED	Ibrahim Afellay
21	GK	(Netherlands) NED	Bas Roorda
22	MF	(Hungary) HUN	Balázs Dzsudzsák
23	DF	(Brazil) BRA	Fagner
24	DF	(Netherlands) NED	Dirk Marcellis
25	MF	(Netherlands) NED	John de Jong
26	MF	(Netherlands) NED	Tommie van der Leegte

No.	Pos.	Nation	Player
28	MF	(Netherlands) NED	Otman Bakkal
29	FW	(Netherlands) NED	Género Zeefuik
31	GK	(Brazil) BRA	Cássio
34	DF	(Morocco) MAR	Rochdi Achenteh (Note: Achenteh was born in Eindhoven, Netherlands, but also qualified to represent Morocco internationally and represented them at U-23 level before making his international debut for Morocco in November 2014.)
35	DF	(Netherlands) NED	Bart van Berlo
36	MF	(Netherlands) NED	Rob van Boekel
37	DF	(Suriname) SUR	Ridny Cairo
38	DF	(Netherlands) NED	Rens van Eijden
39	DF	(Netherlands) NED	Jahmill Flu
40	DF	(Netherlands) NED	Freek Heerkens
41	FW	(Netherlands) NED	Ronald Hikspoors
42	DF	(Netherlands) NED	Olivier ter Horst
43	DF	(Netherlands) NED	Eelco Horsten
44	MF	(Netherlands) NED	Lars Hutten
45	GK	(Netherlands) NED	Gino Mommers
46	FW	(Netherlands) NED	Nicky Munz
47	DF	(Belgium) BEL	Yannick Rymenants
48	MF	(Netherlands) NED	Romario Sabajo
49	DF	(Netherlands) NED	Martijn Thomassen
51	FW	(Netherlands) NED	Paul Voss
52	MF	(Netherlands) NED	Jasper Waalkens
53	MF	(Belgium) BEL	Stijn Wuytens

=== Left club during season ===
Note: Flags indicate national team as defined under FIFA eligibility rules; some limited exceptions apply. Players may hold more than one non-FIFA nationality.

No.	Pos.	Nation	Player
4	DF	(Portugal) POR	Manuel da Costa (Note: Da Costa was born in Saint-Max, France, but also qualified to represent Morocco and Portugal internationally, and represented Portugal at U-20, U-21, and U-23 level, before making his international debut for Morocco in May 2014.) (to Fiorentina)
10	FW	(Ivory Coast) CIV	Arouna Koné (to Sevilla)
11	FW	(Denmark) DEN	Kenneth Perez (to Ajax)

No.	Pos.	Nation	Player
22	DF	(Hungary) HUN	Csaba Fehér (to NAC Breda)
31	GK	(Belgium) BEL	Ruud Boffin (on loan to FC Eindhoven)

== Results ==
=== Champions League ===
==== Group stage ====
23 October 2007	PSV Eindhoven (Netherlands)	0–0	(Turkey) Fenerbahçe	Philips Stadion, Eindhoven
20:45		Report MatchCentre		Attendance: 35,000; Referee: Howard Webb (England)

7 November 2007	Fenerbahçe (Turkey)	2–0	(Netherlands) PSV Eindhoven	Şükrü Saracoğlu Stadium, Istanbul
20:45	Marcellis 28' (o.g.); Semih 30'	Report MatchCentre		Attendance: 46,229; Referee: Alain Hamer (Luxembourg)
