= 2009–10 PSV Eindhoven season =

PSV Eindhoven
2009–10 season
- Head coach: Fred Rutten
- Stadium: Philips Stadion
- Eredivisie: 3rd
- KNVB Cup: Quarter-finals
- UEFA Europa League: Round of 32
- Top goalscorer: League: Balázs Dzsudzsák (14); All: Balázs Dzsudzsák (17)
Home colours	Away colours

During the 2009–10 Dutch football season, PSV Eindhoven competed in the Eredivisie.

== Season summary ==
PSV finished the league campaign in third place, one spot higher than the previous season. This finish was enough to secure a spot in the play-off round of the 2010–11 UEFA Europa League.

== Competitions ==
=== Eredivisie ===
==== League table ====
Pos	Team	Pld	W	D	L	GF	GA	GD	Pts	Qualification or relegation
1	Twente (C)	34	27	5	2	63	23	+40	86	Qualification to Champions League group stage
2	Ajax	34	27	4	3	106	20	+86	85	Qualification to Champions League third qualifying round
3	PSV	34	23	9	2	72	29	+43	78	Qualification to Europa League play-off round
4	Feyenoord	34	17	12	5	54	31	+23	63	Qualification to Europa League play-off round
5	AZ	34	19	5	10	64	34	+30	62	Qualification to Europa League third qualifying round

Source: eredivsie.nl (in Dutch)
Rules for classification: 1) points; 2) goal difference; 3) number of goals scored.
(C) Champions

=== UEFA Europa League ===
==== Qualifying rounds ====
30 July 2009 Third qualifying round first leg	PSV (Netherlands)	1–0	(Bulgaria) Cherno More	Philips Stadion, Eindhoven
20:45	Marcellis 90+3'	Report		Attendance: 13,170; Referee: Lucílio Batista (Portugal)

6 August 2009 Third qualifying round second leg	Cherno More (Bulgaria)	0–1 (0–2 agg.)	(Netherlands) PSV	Lazur Stadium, Burgas ^{48}
18:00		Report	Coulibaly 30' (o.g.)	Attendance: 9,500; Referee: Thorsten Kinhöfer (Germany)

20 August 2009 Play-off round first leg	Bnei Yehuda (Israel)	0–1	(Netherlands) PSV	Bloomfield Stadium, Tel Aviv
18:30		Report	Afellay 23'	Referee: Jonas Eriksson (Sweden)

27 August 2009 Play-off round second leg	PSV (Netherlands)	1–0 (2–0 agg.)	(Israel) Bnei Yehuda	Philips Stadion, Eindhoven
20:45	Simons 25' (pen.)	Report		Attendance: 7,500; Referee: César Muñiz Fernández (Spain)

==== Group stage ====
Pos	Team	Pld	W	D	L	GF	GA	GD	Pts	Qualification
1	(Netherlands) PSV	6	4	2	0	8	3	+5	14	Advance to knockout phase
2	(Denmark) Copenhagen	6	3	1	2	7	4	+3	10	Advance to knockout phase
3	(Czech Republic) Sparta Prague	6	2	1	3	7	9	−2	7	
4	(Romania) CFR Cluj	6	1	0	5	4	10	−6	3	

17 September 2009	Sparta Prague (Czech Republic)	2–2	(Netherlands) PSV	Generali Arena, Prague
21:05	Hubník 76'; Zeman 87'	Report	Reis 80', 90+1' (pen.)	Attendance: 16,703; Referee: Dougie McDonald (Scotland)

1 October 2009	PSV (Netherlands)	1–0	(Romania) CFR Cluj	Philips Stadion, Eindhoven
19:00	Bakkal 9'	Report		Attendance: 14,500; Referee: Tommy Skjerven (Norway)

22 October 2009	PSV (Netherlands)	1–0	(Denmark) Copenhagen	Philips Stadion, Eindhoven
19:00	Reis 72'	Report		Attendance: 16,000; Referee: Alan Kelly (Republic of Ireland)

5 November 2009	Copenhagen (Denmark)	1–1	(Netherlands) PSV	Parken Stadium, Copenhagen
21:05	Grønkjær 39' (pen.)	Report	Dzsudzsák 72'	Attendance: 21,605; Referee: Vladimír Hriňák (Slovakia)

3 December 2009	PSV (Netherlands)	1–0	(Czech Republic) Sparta Prague	Philips Stadion, Eindhoven
19:00	Reis 90+1'	Report		Attendance: 26,400; Referee: Martin Ingvarsson (Sweden)

16 December 2009	CFR Cluj (Romania)	0–2	(Netherlands) PSV	Stadionul Dr. Constantin Rădulescu, Cluj-Napoca
21:05		Report	Lazović 19' (pen.); Amrabat 68'	Attendance: 3,000; Referee: Saïd Ennjimi (France)

==== Round of 32 ====
18 February 2010 Round of 32 first leg	Hamburg (Germany)	1–0	(Netherlands) PSV	HSH Nordbank Arena, Hamburg
21:05	Jansen 26' (pen.)	Report		Attendance: 35,672; Referee: Claudio Circhetta (Switzerland)

25 February 2010 Round of 32 second leg	PSV (Netherlands)	3–2 (3–3 agg.)	(Germany) Hamburg	Philips Stadion, Eindhoven
19:00	Toivonen 2'; Dzsudzsák 43'; Koevermans 90'	Report	Petrić 46'; Trochowski 79' (pen.)	Attendance: 30,500; Referee: Mike Dean (England)

== Kit ==
Philips continued their sponsorship of PSV's kits, as did Nike for PSV's kit manufacturing.

== Players ==
=== First-team squad ===
Squad at end of season

Note: Flags indicate national team as defined under FIFA eligibility rules; some limited exceptions apply. Players may hold more than one non-FIFA nationality.

No.	Pos.	Nation	Player
1	GK	SWE	Andreas Isaksson
2	DF	NED	Jan Kromkamp
3	DF	MEX	Carlos Salcido
4	DF	MEX	Francisco Javier Rodríguez
5	DF	SRB	Jagoš Vuković
6	MF	BEL	Timmy Simons (captain)
7	FW	SWE	Ola Toivonen
8	MF	NED	Andy van der Meyde
10	FW	NED	Danny Koevermans
11	MF	NED	Nordin Amrabat (Note: Amrabat was born in Naarden, Netherlands, and represented them at U-21 level, but also qualified to represent Morocco internationally and would make his international debut for Morocco in 2011.)
14	DF	NED	Erik Pieters
15	MF	BEL	Stijn Wuytens
18	MF	NED	Orlando Engelaar

No.	Pos.	Nation	Player
19	DF	NED	Steve Olfers
20	MF	NED	Ibrahim Afellay
21	GK	NED	Bas Roorda
22	MF	HUN	Balázs Dzsudzsák
23	DF	NED	André Ooijer
24	DF	NED	Dirk Marcellis
25	DF	BUL	Stanislav Manolev
28	MF	NED	Otman Bakkal
31	GK	BRA	Cássio
36	MF	BEL	Funso Ojo
40	GK	NED	Stefan Toonen
52	MF	NED	Zakaria Labyad (Note: Labyad was born in Utrecht, Netherlands, and represented them at U-17 level, but also qualified to represent Morocco internationally and would make his international debut for Morocco in 2012.)

=== Left club during season ===
Note: Flags indicate national team as defined under FIFA eligibility rules; some limited exceptions apply. Players may hold more than one non-FIFA nationality.

No.	Pos.	Nation	Player
5	DF	NED	Mike Zonneveld (on loan to Groningen)
8	MF	ECU	Édison Méndez (to LDU Quito)
9	FW	SRB	Danko Lazović (to Zenit Saint Petersburg)
16	FW	NED	Stef Nijland (on loan to Willem II)
17	FW	PER	Reimond Manco (on loan to Juan Aurich)

No.	Pos.	Nation	Player
19	MF	CHN	Zhou Haibin (to Shandong Luneng)
39	FW	NED	Nigel Hasselbaink (on loan to Go Ahead Eagles)
40	DF	NED	Olivier ter Horst (to Heracles Almelo)
42	FW	BRA	Jonathan Reis (sacked)

=== Jong PSV ===
Note: Flags indicate national team as defined under FIFA eligibility rules; some limited exceptions apply. Players may hold more than one non-FIFA nationality.

No.	Pos.	Nation	Player
35	DF	NED	Jeffrey van Nuland
37	MF	NED	Romario Sabajo
38	DF	NED	Freek Heerkens
41	GK	NED	Jeroen Zoet
43	DF	NED	Eelco Horsten
44	MF	NED	Lars Hutten
45	DF	BEL	Yannick Rymenants
46	DF	SUR	Ridny Cairo
47	DF	NED	Abel Tamata (Note: Tamata was born in Bergen op Zoom, Netherlands, but also qualified to represent DR Congo internationally and would make his international debut for DR Congo in 2015.)
48	DF	NED	Martijn Thomassen
49	MF	NED	Kay Velda
50	MF	BEL	Jason Bourdouxhe
51	GK	NED	Benjamin van Leer
53	FW	ANG	Josemar Makiavala

No.	Pos.	Nation	Player
54	MF	NED	Gianluca Maria (Note: Maria was born in Venray, Netherlands, but also qualified to represent Curaçao internationally and would make his international debut for Curaçao in 2014.)
55	DF	BEL	Stefano Marzo
56	MF	NED	Youness Mokhtar (Note: Mokhtar was born in Utrecht, Netherlands, and represented them at U-17 and U-18 level, but also qualified to represent Morocco internationally through his parents and would later represent them at U-20 and U-23 level.)
57	MF	NED	Imad Najah (Note: Najah was born in Utrecht, Netherlands, but also qualified to represent Morocco internationally and would make his debut for the Morocco U-23 team in 2012.)
58	DF	NED	Robert Oepkes
59	DF	BEL	Marco Ospitalieri
60	MF	BEL	Wouter Smeets
61	GK	NED	Kelle Roos
62	DF	NED	Maikel Verkoelen
63	DF	BEL	Dries Wuytens
64	MF	NED	Peter van Ooijen
65	FW	NED	Jorn Sweres
66	MF	BEL	Arne Nilis
67	MF	AUT	Marcel Ritzmaier
