= 2008–09 PSV Eindhoven season =

PSV Eindhoven
2008–09 season
- Head coach: Huub Stevens (until 28 January); Dwight Lodeweges
- Stadium: Philips Stadion
- Eredivisie: 4th
- KNVB Cup: Third round
- Johan Cruyff Shield: Winners
- Champions League: Group stage
- Top goalscorer: Ibrahim Afellay (13)
Home colours	Away colours	Third colours

During the 2008–09 Dutch football season, PSV Eindhoven competed in the Eredivisie.

== Season summary ==
Despite winning the Johan Cruyff Shield, manager Huub Stevens resigned in late January. His assistant Dwight Lodeweges acted as caretaker manager for the rest of the season, leaving at the season's end to manage NEC Nijmegen.

== Competitions ==
=== Eredivisie ===
==== League table ====
Pos	Team	Pld	W	D	L	GF	GA	GD	Pts	Qualification or relegation
2	Twente	34	20	9	5	62	31	+31	69	Qualification to Champions League third qualifying round
3	Ajax	34	21	5	8	74	41	+33	68	Qualification to Europa League play-off round
4	PSV	34	19	8	7	71	33	+38	65	Qualification to Europa League third qualifying round
5	Heerenveen	34	17	9	8	66	57	+9	60	Qualification to Europa League play-off round (Note: Heerenveen qualified for the play-off round of the UEFA Europa League 2009–10 by winning the 2008–09 KNVB Cup.)
6	Groningen	34	17	5	12	53	36	+17	56	Qualification to European competition play-offs

Source: ESPN Eredivisie Table
Rules for classification: 1) points; 2) goal difference; 3) number of goals scored.

=== Johan Cruyff Shield ===
23 August 2008 Final	Feyenoord	0–2	PSV	Amsterdam Arena, Amsterdam
		Report	Lazović 55'; Marcellis 67'	Attendance: 30,000; Referee: Kevin Blom

=== UEFA Champions League ===
Pos	Team	Pld	W	D	L	GF	GA	GD	Pts	Qualification
1	(England) Liverpool	6	4	2	0	11	5	+6	14	Advance to knockout phase
2	(Spain) Atlético Madrid	6	3	3	0	9	4	+5	12	Advance to knockout phase
3	(France) Marseille	6	1	1	4	5	7	−2	4	Transfer to UEFA Cup
4	(Netherlands) PSV Eindhoven	6	1	0	5	5	14	−9	3	

Source: RSSSF

== First-team squad ==
Squad at end of season

Note: Flags indicate national team as defined under FIFA eligibility rules; some limited exceptions apply. Players may hold more than one non-FIFA nationality.

No.	Pos.	Nation	Player
1	GK	SWE	Andreas Isaksson
2	DF	NED	Jan Kromkamp
3	DF	MEX	Carlos Salcido
4	DF	MEX	Francisco Rodríguez
5	DF	NED	Mike Zonneveld
6	MF	BEL	Timmy Simons
7	FW	SWE	Ola Toivonen
8	MF	ECU	Édison Méndez
9	FW	SRB	Danko Lazović
10	FW	NED	Danny Koevermans
11	MF	NED	Nordin Amrabat (Note: Amrabat was born in Naarden, Netherlands, and represented them at U-21 level, but also qualified to represent Morocco internationally and would make his international debut for Morocco in 2011.)

No.	Pos.	Nation	Player
13	DF	FRA	Jérémie Bréchet
14	DF	NED	Erik Pieters
15	MF	AUS	Jason Culina
16	FW	NED	Stef Nijland
20	MF	NED	Ibrahim Afellay
21	GK	NED	Bas Roorda
22	MF	HUN	Balázs Dzsudzsák
24	DF	NED	Dirk Marcellis
28	MF	NED	Otman Bakkal
36	MF	BEL	Funso Ojo
41	GK	NED	Jeroen Zoet

=== Left club during season ===
Note: Flags indicate national team as defined under FIFA eligibility rules; some limited exceptions apply. Players may hold more than one non-FIFA nationality.

No.	Pos.	Nation	Player
17	FW	PER	Reimond Manco (on loan to Willem II)
18	DF	GHA	Eric Addo (on loan to Roda JC Kerkrade)
19	FW	BRA	Jonathan Reis (on loan to Tupi)
23	DF	BRA	Fagner (on loan to Vitória)
26	MF	NED	Tommie van der Leegte (to NAC Breda)

No.	Pos.	Nation	Player
29	DF	BEL	Stijn Wuytens (on loan to De Graafschap)
30	MF	FIN	Mika Väyrynen (to Heerenveen)
31	GK	BRA	Cássio (on loan to Sparta Rotterdam)
34	DF	NED	Rens van Eijden (on loan to Willem II)
