= 2006–07 PSV Eindhoven season =

PSV
2006–07 season
- Head coach: Ronald Koeman
- Stadium: Philips Stadion
- Eredivisie: 1st
- KNVB Cup: Quarter-final
- Champions League: Quarter-final
- Top goalscorer: League: Jefferson Farfán (21); All: Jefferson Farfán (24)
Home colours	Away colours	Third colours

During the 2006–07 Dutch football season, PSV competed in the Eredivisie.

== Season summary ==
PSV clinched a third successive Eredivisie title. The club had been 11 points ahead of second-placed AZ after 20 matches, but their lead disappeared in the next 13 until, following PSV's draw at FC Utrecht in the penultimate round, PSV, AZ and Ajax all stood equal on 72 points from 33 matches, with AZ leading the Eredivisie on goal difference. AZ suffered a shock defeat at Excelsior in the final round, playing with 10 men after 15 minutes in the game. Ajax won 0–2 at Willem II, and PSV beat Vitesse 5–1. PSV and Ajax both finished on 75 points, but PSV finished first due to a superior goal difference (+50, against +49 for Ajax) to end one of the most exciting and closest title races in many years.

PSV enjoyed decent form in the UEFA Champions League as well. Entering directly into the group stage, the club finished second in Group C, behind Liverpool and ahead of Bordeaux and Galatasaray. PSV went on to face the previous season's runners-up Arsenal in the first knockout round. Édison Méndez, who had been nominated for the 2006 Ballon d'Or, scored PSV's goal in a 1–0 win at the Philips Stadion, and an Alex goal in the Emirates Stadium gave PSV a 2–1 aggregate win. Liverpool then made a return to the Netherlands to face the club in the quarter-finals, and recorded a solid 3–0 win. A 1–0 win in the return leg at Anfield saw PSV eliminated.

== Squad ==
Squad at end of season

Note: Flags indicate national team as defined under FIFA eligibility rules; some limited exceptions apply. Players may hold more than one non-FIFA nationality.

No.	Pos.	Nation	Player
1	GK	BRA	Heurelho Gomes
2	DF	NED	Jan Kromkamp
3	DF	NED	Michael Reiziger
4	DF	BRA	Alex
6	MF	BEL	Timmy Simons
7	MF	FIN	Mika Väyrynen
8	MF	NED	Phillip Cocu (captain)
9	FW	NED	Patrick Kluivert
10	FW	CIV	Arouna Koné
11	MF	ECU	Édison Méndez (on loan from LDU Quito)
13	DF	BRA	Alcides (on loan from Chelsea)
14	DF	POR	Manuel da Costa
15	MF	AUS	Jason Culina
17	FW	PER	Jefferson Farfán
18	DF	GHA	Eric Addo
19	DF	NED	Michael Lamey

No.	Pos.	Nation	Player
20	MF	NED	Ibrahim Afellay
21	GK	NED	Oscar Moens
22	MF	HUN	Csaba Fehér
23	DF	MEX	Carlos Salcido
24	MF	USA	Lee Nguyen
25	MF	NED	John de Jong
26	FW	BRA	Diego Tardelli (on loan from São Paulo)
27	FW	NED	Género Zeefuik
28	DF	CHN	Sun Xiang (on loan from Shanghai Shenhua)
30	DF	ESP	Pepe Pla
31	GK	BEL	Ruud Boffin
38	DF	NED	Rens van Eijden
39	DF	NED	Dirk Marcellis
40	MF	MAR	Bilal El Jacoubi
44	DF	NED	Olivier ter Horst
52	MF	TUN	Tijani Belaid (on loan from Inter Milan)

=== Left club during season ===
Note: Flags indicate national team as defined under FIFA eligibility rules; some limited exceptions apply. Players may hold more than one non-FIFA nationality.

No.	Pos.	Nation	Player
2	DF	NED	André Ooijer (to Blackburn Rovers)
5	DF	ENG	Michael Ball (to Manchester City)
9	FW	NED	Jan Vennegoor of Hesselink (to Celtic)
11	MF	USA	DaMarcus Beasley (on loan to Manchester City)

No.	Pos.	Nation	Player
16	MF	NED	Ismaïl Aissati (on loan to Twente)
29	MF	NED	Arvid Smit (to Marítimo)
32	MF	BEL	Jelle de Bock (on loan to Red Star Waasland)
33	FW	NED	Roy Beerens (on loan to NEC)

== Statistics ==
=== Starting 11 ===
Considering starts in all competitions

No.	Pos.	Nat.	Name	MS	Notes
1	GK	(Brazil)	Heurelho Gomes	44	
2	RB	(Netherlands)	Jan Kromkamp	27	
4	CB	(Brazil)	Alex	39	
14	CB	(Portugal)	Manuel da Costa	20	
23	LB	(Mexico)	Carlos Salcido	44	
11	RM	(Ecuador)	Édison Méndez	27	
6	CM	(Belgium)	Timmy Simons	35	
8	CM	(Netherlands)	Phillip Cocu	39	
20	LM	(Netherlands)	Ibrahim Afellay	32	
10	CF	(Ivory Coast)	Arouna Koné	40	
17	CF	(Peru)	Jefferson Farfán	39	

== Results ==
=== Johan Cruyff Shield ===
13 August 2006	Ajax	3–1	PSV	Amsterdam
				Stadium: Amsterdam Arena

=== Eredivisie ===
==== Matches ====
20 August 2006 1	PSV	3–1	NEC	Eindhoven
				Stadium: Philips Stadion

27 August 2006 2	Twente	1–0	PSV	Enschede
				Stadium: De Grolsch Veste

9 September 2006 3	Willem II	1–3	PSV	Tilburg
				Stadium: Koning Willem II Stadion

17 September 2006 4	PSV	2–1	Feyenoord	Eindhoven
				Stadium: Philips Stadion

23 September 2006 5	ADO Den Haag	0–2	PSV	The Hague
				Stadium: ADO Den Haag Stadium

1 October 2006 6	Heerenveen	0–0	PSV	Heerenveen
				Stadium: Abe Lenstra Stadion

15 October 2006 7	PSV	4–1	Roda JC	Eindhoven
				Stadium: Philips Stadion

22 October 2006 8	AZ Alkmaar	1–3	PSV	Alkmaar
				Stadium: AFAS Stadion

25 October 2006 9	PSV	7–0	Sparta Rotterdam	Eindhoven
				Stadium: Philips Stadion

28 October 2006 10	RKC Waalwijk	0–3	PSV	Waalwijk
				Stadium: Mandemakers Stadion

4 November 2006 11	PSV	3–0	NAC Breda	Eindhoven
				Stadium: Philips Stadion

12 November 2006 12	Ajax	0–1	PSV	Amsterdam
				Stadium: Amsterdam Arena

18 November 2006 13	PSV	4–0	Excelsior	Eindhoven
				Stadium: Philips Stadion

25 November 2006 14	PSV	5–0	Utrecht	Eindhoven
				Stadium: Philips Stadion

2 December 2006 15	Vitesse	0–1	PSV	Arnhem
				Stadium: GelreDome

9 December 2006 16	Groningen	0–2	PSV	Groningen
				Stadium: Euroborg

15 December 2006 17	PSV	3–0	Heracles	Eindhoven
				Stadium: Philips Stadion

23 December 2006 18	PSV	4–0	Willem II	Eindhoven
				Stadium: Philips Stadion

26 December 2006 19	Feyenoord	1–1	PSV	Rotterdam
				Stadium: De Kuip

30 December 2006 20	PSV	2–1	ADO Den Haag	Eindhoven
				Stadium: Philips Stadion

20 January 2007 21	PSV	3–1	Heerenveen	Eindhoven
				Stadium: Philips Stadion

28 January 2007 22	Roda JC	2–0	PSV	Kerkrade
				Stadium: Parkstad Limburg Stadion

3 February 2007 23	PSV	2–3	AZ Alkmaar	Eindhoven
				Stadium: Philips Stadion

11 February 2007 24	Sparta Rotterdam	1–1	PSV	Rotterdam
				Stadium: Sparta Stadion Het Kasteel

17 February 2007 25	Heracles	0–2	PSV	Almelo
				Stadium: Erve Asito

24 February 2007 26	PSV	1–0	Groningen	Eindhoven
				Stadium: Philips Stadion

3 March 2007 27	PSV	2–0	RKC Waalwijk	Eindhoven
				Stadium: Philips Stadion

11 March 2007 28	Excelsior	0–0	PSV	Rotterdam
				Stadium: Stadion Woudestein

18 March 2007 29	PSV	1–5	Ajax	Eindhoven
				Stadium: Philips Stadion

31 March 2007 30	NAC Breda	1–1	PSV	Breda
				Stadium: Rat Verlegh Stadion

7 April 2007 31	NEC	2–1	PSV	Nijmegen
				Stadium: Goffertstadion

14 April 2007 32	PSV	2–0	Twente	Eindhoven
				Stadium: Philips Stadion

22 April 2007 33	Utrecht	1–1	PSV	Utrecht
				Stadium: Stadion Galgenwaard

29 April 2007 34	PSV	5–1	Vitesse	Eindhoven
				Stadium: Philips Stadion
