= 2010–11 PSV Eindhoven season =

PSV Eindhoven
2010–11 season
- Head coach: Fred Rutten
- Stadium: Philips Stadion
- Eredivisie: 3rd
- KNVB Cup: Quarter-finals
- Europa League: Quarter-finals
- Top goalscorer: League: Balázs Dzsudzsák (16); All: Balázs Dzsudzsák (24)
- Average home league attendance: 33,612
Home colours	Away colours

During the 2010–11 Dutch football season, PSV Eindhoven competed in the Eredivisie, KNVB Cup, and the UEFA Europa League.

== Season summary ==
In the league, PSV repeated last season's third-place finish, securing a spot in the play-off round of the following season's UEFA Europa League.

== Players ==
=== First-team squad ===
Squad at end of season

Note: Flags indicate national team as defined under FIFA eligibility rules; some limited exceptions apply. Players may hold more than one non-FIFA nationality.

No.	Pos.	Nation	Player
1	GK	SWE	Andreas Isaksson
2	DF	BRA	Marcelo
4	DF	MEX	Francisco Javier Rodríguez
5	DF	SRB	Jagoš Vuković
6	FW	SWE	Marcus Berg (on loan from Hamburg)
7	FW	SWE	Ola Toivonen
8	MF	NED	Orlando Engelaar
9	FW	NED	Jeremain Lens
10	FW	NED	Danny Koevermans
13	MF	CAN	Atiba Hutchinson
14	DF	NED	Erik Pieters

No.	Pos.	Nation	Player
15	MF	BEL	Stijn Wuytens
16	FW	NED	Stef Nijland
18	DF	NED	Wilfred Bouma
19	DF	NED	Jan Kromkamp
22	MF	HUN	Balázs Dzsudzsák
24	MF	NED	Zakaria Labyad (Note: Labyad was born in Utrecht, the Netherlands, and represented the Netherlands at U-17 level but also qualified to represent Morocco internationally and represented Morocco at U-23 level before making his international debut for Morocco in 2012.)
25	DF	BUL	Stanislav Manolev
28	FW	NED	Otman Bakkal
30	FW	BRA	Jonathan Reis
31	GK	BRA	Cássio
36	FW	NED	Género Zeefuik

=== Left club during season ===
Note: Flags indicate national team as defined under FIFA eligibility rules; some limited exceptions apply. Players may hold more than one non-FIFA nationality.

No.	Pos.	Nation	Player
3	DF	MEX	Carlos Salcido (to Fulham)
11	FW	NED	Nordin Amrabat (Note: Amrabat was born in Naarden, the Netherlands, and represented the Netherlands at U-17 level but also qualified to represent Morocco internationally and made his international debut for Morocco in November 2011.) (to Kayserispor)
20	MF	NED	Ibrahim Afellay (to Barcelona)

No.	Pos.	Nation	Player
23	MF	BEL	Funso Ojo (on loan to VVV-Venlo)
61	GK	BEL	Bram Castro (to Sint-Truiden)

== Jong PSV ==
Note: Flags indicate national team as defined under FIFA eligibility rules; some limited exceptions apply. Players may hold more than one non-FIFA nationality.

No.	Pos.	Nation	Player
32	MF	BEL	Jason Bourdouxhe
33	DF	NED	Dennis Dengering
34	FW	NED	Anthony van den Hurk
35	MF	TUR	Okan Köse
37	FW	NED	Romario Sabajo
38	FW	NED	Gianluca Maria (Note: Maria was born in Venray, the Netherlands, but also qualified to represent Curaçao internationally and made his international debut for Curaçao in 2014.)
39	DF	BEL	Stefano Marzo
40	MF	NED	Imad Najah (Note: Najah was born in Utrecht, the Netherlands, but also qualified to represent Morocco internationally and would later represent Morocco at U-23 level.)
41	GK	NED	Jeroen Zoet
42	FW	BEL	Arne Nilis
43	DF	NED	Robert Oepkes
44	MF	NED	Peter van Ooijen

No.	Pos.	Nation	Player
45	MF	TUR	Tufan Özbozkurt (Note: Özbozkurt was born in Utrecht, the Netherlands, and represented the Netherlands at U-19 level, but also qualified to represent Turkey internationally and would later represent Turkey at U-19 and U-20 level.)
46	MF	NED	Rinke Pennings
47	DF	NED	Abel Tamata (Note: Tamata was born in Bergen op Zoom, the Netherlands, but also qualified to represent the Democratic Republic of the Congo internationally through his father and made his international debut for the Democratic Republic of the Congo in 2015.)
48	MF	NED	Martijn Thomassen
49	DF	NED	Maikel Verkoelen
50	DF	BEL	Dries Wuytens
51	GK	NED	Benjamin van Leer
54	MF	BEL	Marco Ospitalieri
56	MF	NED	Youness Mokhtar
71	GK	NED	Nigel Bertrams
—	MF	NGA	Rabiu Ibrahim
