= Balázs Dzsudzsák =

Hungarian footballer (born 1986)

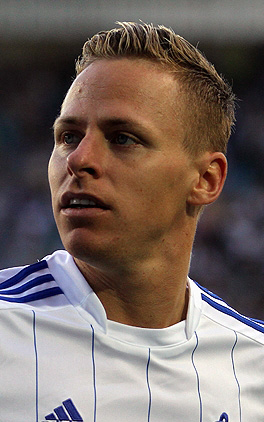
- Dzsudzsák with Dynamo Moscow in 2012

Personal information
- Date of birth: 23 December 1986 (age 39)
- Place of birth: Debrecen, Hungary
- Height: 1.79 m (5 ft 10 in)
- Position: Winger

Team information
- Current team: Debreceni VSC
- Number: 10

Senior career*
Years	Team	Apps	(Gls)
2004–2008	Debrecen	48	(14)
2008–2011	PSV	114	(45)
2011–2012	Anzhi Makhachkala	8	(0)
2012–2015	Dynamo Moscow	89	(14)
2015–2016	Bursaspor	23	(3)
2016–2018	Al Wahda	43	(14)
2018–2020	Ittihad Kalba	36	(9)
2020	Al Ain	4	(1)
2020–	Debrecen	186	(34)

International career
2003	Hungary U17	6	(1)
2003	Hungary U19	6	(5)
2007–2022	Hungary	109	(21)
- * Club domestic league appearances and goals as of 30 May 2026

Balázs Dzsudzsák (Hungarian pronunciation: [ˈbɒlaːʒ ˈd͡ʒud͡ʒaːk]; born 23 December 1986), Hungarian professional footballer who plays as a winger for Nemzeti Bajnokság I club Debreceni VSC.

Dzsudzsák began his career at his hometown club Debreceni VSC, winning consecutive league titles in each of his three seasons before departing to PSV of the Netherlands in January 2008, ending the season with the Eredivisie title. He joined Dynamo Moscow in 2012 after a brief spell at Anzhi Makhachkala, before joining Turkish side Bursaspor in 2015 and Emirati club Al Wahda FC a year later.

Dzsudzsák made his full international debut for Hungary in 2007, and since earned 109 caps. He captained the side at UEFA Euro 2016. On 20 November 2022, he set the record of most appearances in the national team.

== Club career ==
=== Early career ===
Dzsudzsák, who has Polish roots, was born in Debrecen but grew up in Nyírlugos. He started at Nyíradony Focisuli and was signed by Debreceni Olasz Focisuli, a football academy for young talents and was a sure way towards Debreceni VSC. In 2004, he played for Létavértes SC on loan from Debrecen in Nemzeti Bajnokság III, the Hungarian third division.

=== Debrecen ===
Dzsudzsák made his debut in the Hungarian National Championship I in 2004. He played twice during his first season with Debrecen. In his second season, he played ten matches and scored two goals. In the following two seasons, he became a permanent member of the squad, playing 36 matches and scoring 12 goals. He won the Hungarian National Championship I three times, in 2005, 2006 and 2007 and the Hungarian Super Cup three times, in 2005, 2006 and 2007.

=== PSV Eindhoven ===
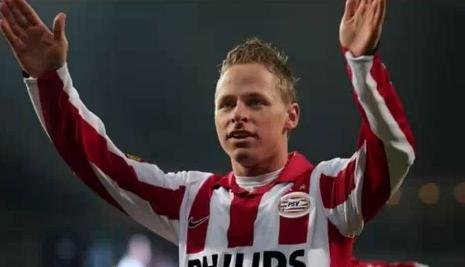
Dzsudzsák during his time at PSV

On 24 October 2007, Dzsudzsák joined Dutch side PSV, signing a five-year contract. The left winger was originally to make his transfer to PSV in the summer of 2008, although the departure of Kenneth Perez from the PSV squad prompted PSV to speed up his transfer to January 2008. PSV scout Piet de Visser stated that Dzsudzsák "is an incredible talent. He is fast, good in the combination, can pass his man and give a good cross. You don't see them like this very often anymore. He is a modern left-winger".

Dzsudzsák made his Eredivisie debut on 12 January 2008, a 1–0 win against Feyenoord; Dzsudzsák was in the starting XI in the match and recorded three shots on goal. On the next matchday, he scored his first league goal in a 1–1 draw with VVV-Venlo. Dzsudzsák recorded his first assist on 23 January 2008 in a 3–1 win against Sparta Rotterdam. He managed to score five league goals in his first season, helping PSV win the Eredivisie title.

The 2008–09 season saw a new team coach arrive in Huub Stevens. Dzsudzsák scored his first hat-trick in a 6–0 victory against ADO Den Haag at the Philips Stadion on 5 February 2009 in the Eredivisie. He played a total of 32 league matches during the season, scoring 11 goals and 9 assists.

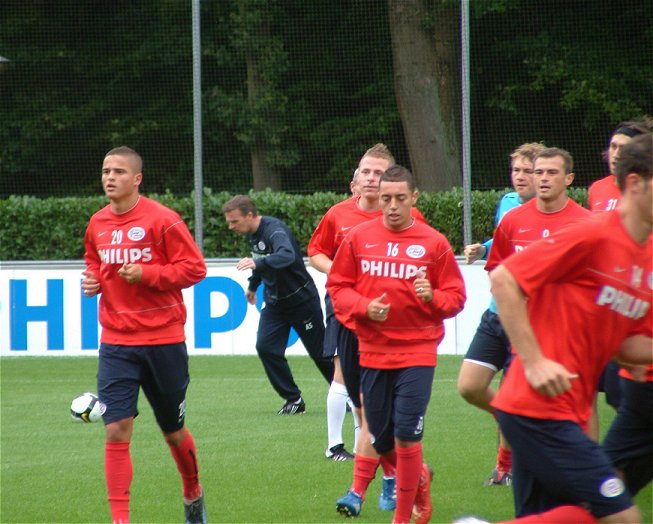
Dzsudzsák at PSV training

In the 2009–10 season, Fred Rutten took over the team. Dzsudzsák was named Man of the Match in a 4–3 victory over archrivals Ajax on matchday 3 of the Eredivisie, on 15 August 2009. Dzsudzsák scored two goals and one assist in the match. Dzsudzsák finished the 2009–10 season with 14 goals and 16 assists. In a UEFA Europa League match against Hamburger SV, Dzsudzsák was shown a straight red card by English referee Mike Dean after the player pushed the match official.

In 2010–11, Dzsudzsák had his best season yet for PSV and his career, as he scored 16 goals and provided 12 assists, finishing fourth and fifth in the Eredivisie respectively; he also scored 7 goals in 13 matches in European competitions for a total of 24 goals in 49 games. In 2011, Dzsudzsák signed an extension to his contract with PSV. Although he extended his contract at PSV, there was still interest from other clubs, including Russian side Anzhi Makhachkala.

=== Anzhi Makhachkala ===
On 12 June 2011, Dzsudzsák was transferred to Russian Premier League club Anzhi Makhachkala for an undisclosed fee, signing a four-year contract. "I am very happy to become part of an ambitious project at Anzhi," he said. "It is a big step forward in my career. I am eagerly looking forward to getting on the pitch with my new team-mates Roberto Carlos, Samuel Eto'o, Mbark Boussoufa, Diego Tardelli and others. I have heard a lot about the fantastic atmosphere at home games in Makhachkala." He made his Anzhi debut on 6 August against Tom Tomsk in a 2–0 victory. Dzsudzsák made eight appearances for Anzhi, mostly as a substitute. On 27 August 2011, in a match against, Rostov, he suffered a broken collar bone after a collision with an opponent, which kept him sidelined for the remainder of the season.

=== Dynamo Moscow ===
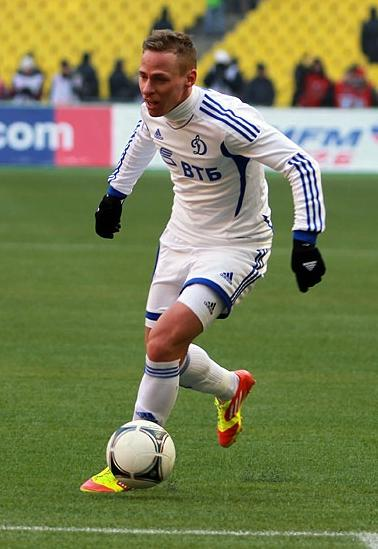
Dzsudzsák playing in a Russian Premier League match for Dynamo

On 12 January 2012, Dzsudzsák was transferred to Dynamo Moscow, after the capital club paid the minimum release fee of €19 million, making Dzsudzsák the most expensive Hungarian player ever. He made his Dynamo debut on 9 March 2012 against CSKA Moscow, setting up a goal in 75th minute to help ensure a 1–1 draw.

==== 2012–13 season ====
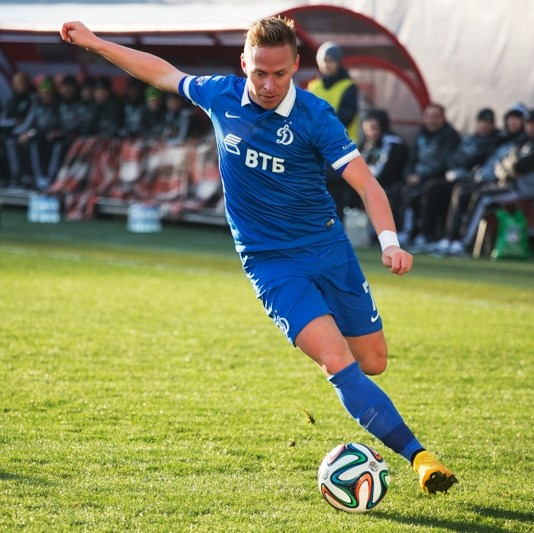
Dzsudzsák scored his first goal against Terek Grozny in the 2012–13 Russian Premier League season

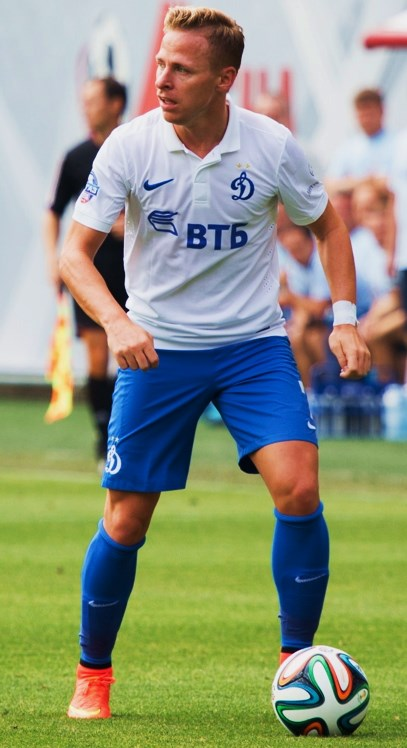
Dzsudzsák playing for Dynamo against Spartak Moscow

On 19 August 2012, Dzsudzsák scored his first league goal for Dynamo Moscow in the 75th minute against Terek Grozny in the 2012–13 Russian Premier League season. On the next matchday, on 25 August 2012, he played his most productive game in Russia at that point, scoring a goal and providing assists for two more in 3–2 victory over Lokomotiv Moscow.

On 30 September 2012, he scored in the Moscow derby against CSKA Moscow at the Arena Khimki in the 38th minute; the match ended in a 2–0 victory for Dynamo. Dzsudzsák also scored in a home 3–0 victory over Rubin Kazan at the Arena Khimki in the 30th minute, on 1 December 2012.

On 7 February 2013, it was revealed that Liverpool failed to sign Dzsudzsák, a target of Liverpool manager Brendan Rodgers, during the January transfer. According to József Vörösbarányi, Dzsdzsák's agent, Dynamo was not interested in selling him.

On 5 May 2013, Dzsudzsák scored his last goal in the 2012–13 Russian Premier League season against Krylya Sovetov Samara at the Stadion Metalurh in the fifth minute in a 2–1 victory.

On 17 June 2013, Sky Sports published an article on Dzsudzsák's possible move to Liverpool or Inter Milan. József Vörösbarányi claimed that both Liverpool and Inter were among those clubs interested in Dzsudzsák. Dzsudzsák, however, did not tell his willingness to leave the club since he felt "good" at Dynamo and had an excellent relationship with his coach, Dan Petrescu, at the time.

==== 2013–14 season ====
The 2013–14 Russian Premier League season was the least productive for Dzsudzsák since he scored only one goal on 24 August 2013 against Zenit Saint Petersburg at the Arena Khimki in the 64th minute.

==== 2014–15 season ====
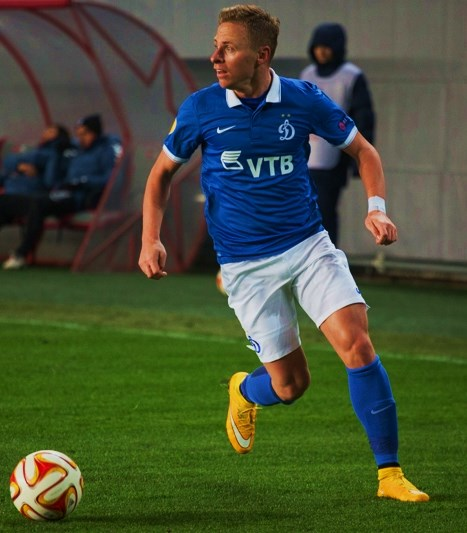
Dzsudzsák playing in the UEFA Europa League 2014–15 against G.D. Estoril Praia

On 16 October 2014, it was revealed that Dynamo Moscow are planning to offer to extend Dzsudzsák's contract. At the time, Dzsudzsák earned €2.6 million, but the club was willing to raise his salary to €3.2 million. This means that Dzsudzsák would be able to earn 2.7 million HUF/daily. Although Dzsudzsák scored a goal in the 50th minute against Lokomotiv Moscow in the Moscow derby, Dynamo lost the match 4–2 on 2 November 2014 in the 2014–15 Russian Premier League season. On the 17th matchday of the Premier League season, Dzsudzsák scored a goal and gave two assists against Amkar Perm at the Arena Khimki. On 10 December 2014, before the final match of the 2014–15 Europa League group stage match against his former club PSV, Dzsudzsák was honoured by his former club by displaying his footprint at the museum of the club. On 19 December 2014, Dzsudzsák was awarded the best Hungarian football player of the year 2014 by the journalist of the Hungarian sport journal, nb1.hu. Dzsudzsák finished first (receiving 111 points), while Roland Juhász (92 points) second and Zoltán Gera third (44 points). On 23 December 2014, Itasportpress.it revealed that Bundesliga club Borussia Dortmund showed interest in signing Dzsudzsák due to the possible financial problems of the Russian Premier League clubs including Dynamo Moscow. Previously, Dzsudzsák was linked with Serie A club Lazio and English Premier League clubs, including Liverpool and Everton. On 15 January 2015, Dzsudzsák was linked again with Lazio.

On 9 April 2015, Dzsudzsák scored a superb goal in the 24th minute against CSKA Moscow in the 2014–15 Russian Premier League season at the Arena Khimki in Moscow. The Moscow derby ended with a 2–1 victory of Dynamo Moscow. After the match Dzsudzsák said "we consider this victory as if we had won the final".

=== Bursaspor ===
On 16 August 2015, Dzsudzsák signed for Bursaspor for €1.6 million. On 12 September, he scored his first and second Bursaspor goal, on matchday 4 of the 2015–16 Süper Lig against Gençlerbirliği at Bursa Atatürk Stadium.

=== Al Wahda ===
On 29 March 2018, he played as Al Wahba won the Arabian Gulf Cup 2–1 against Al Wasl.

=== Return to Debrecen ===
On 22 September 2020, he was signed by his former club Debreceni VSC. Due to the relegation to the Nemzeti Bajnokság II of Debrecen, Dzsudzsák can play his first return match in the 2020–21 Nemzeti Bajnokság II season. On 6 March 2021, he scored his first goal in the Nemzeti Bajnokság II against Kaposvári Rákóczi FC on the 28th game week of the 2020–21 Nemzeti Bajnokság II season at the Nagyerdei Stadion. On 1 July 2022, he signed a one-year contract with Debrecen. At the end of the '24-'25 season he signed a new one-year deal with Debreceni VSC that keeps him playing until June 2026. On 9 June 2026, he scored his first head in a 1–0 victory over Nyíregyháza Spartacus FC in the 2026–27 Nemzeti Bajnokság I season.

== International career ==
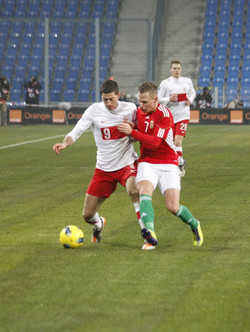
Dzsudzsák against Lewandowski in 2011.

Dzsudzsák made his Hungary debut on 2 June 2007 in Heraklion against Greece. His first international goal came on 24 May 2008, incidentally in a match against Greece again. His fourth goal was a 94th-minute winner against Finland on 12 October 2010. Dzsudzsák scored his fifth goal against Lithuania in a friendly match in the Stadion Sóstói. He has scored three of his goals in the final three games in 2010, two of which were UEFA Euro qualifiers. Dzsudzsák scored the third goal of the four goals against Iceland at the Puskás Ferenc Stadium. The match finished 4–0. On 10 September 2013, Dzsudzsák scored his a goal wearing the national team's shirt in a 5–1 victory over Estonia in the 2014 FIFA World Cup qualification match at the Puskás Ferenc Stadium.

On 11 October 2013, Hungary suffered an 8–1 record defeat at the Amsterdam Arena against the Netherlands; Dzsudzsák scored the only Hungarian goal.

On 22 May 2014, Hungary hosted Denmark at the newly built Nagyerdei Stadion in Debrecen. The match's first goal was scored for Hungary by Dzsudzsák; the final result was 2–2.

On 11 October 2014, Hungary drew with Romania at the Arena Națională, Bucharest, in a UEFA Euro 2016 qualifying match; the equaliser was scored by Dzsudzsák. On 31 May 2016, Dzsudzsak was selected for Hungary's Euro 2016 squad as team captain.

On 14 June 2016, he played in the first group match in a 2–0 victory over Austria in Hungary's Group F match at the Nouveau Stade de Bordeaux in Bordeaux. Three days later, on 18 June, he played in a 1–1 draw against Iceland at the Stade Vélodrome, Marseille. Dzsudzsák also played in the last group stage match in a 3–3 draw against Portugal at the Parc Olympique Lyonnais in Lyon, on 22 June; he scored Hungary's second and third goal, thus helping his side in finishing at the top of group F.

On 20 November 2022, he played his last match wearing the national team's shirt against Greece. The match ended with a 2–1 victory for Hungary. After the winning match he thanked the football fans for their support and watching his farewell match. He then partied with Hungarian musician, Kis Grófo.

== Outside football ==
=== Personal life ===
In 2010, it was revealed that Dzsudzsák was dating Hungarian model and socialite Linda Zimány.

=== Charity ===
Dzsudzsák offered €1,000 to the tournament Összefogás napja, which tributes to players who died young, including Miklós Fehér and Gábor Zavadszky.

Dzsudzsák, along with Hungarian international Roland Juhász, offered HUF 1 million each to the victims of the Ajka alumina plant accident.

On 13 April 2013, Dzsudzsák offered a HUF 3 million-worth medical device to the fund Szemem Fénye Alapítvány.

In September 2014, as captain of the Hungary national team, he and Roland Juhász decided, along with other Hungary teammates, to pay the tickets for about 1,200 fans for the away match against Romania.

=== Sponsorship ===
On 26 July 2013, EA Sports announced that they would feature Dzsudzsák on the Hungarian cover of FIFA 14, alongside global cover star Lionel Messi.

== Career statistics ==
=== Club ===
As of match played 19 September 2026

Appearances and goals by club, season and competition
Club	Season	League			National cup (Note: Includes Magyar Kupa, KNVB Cup, Russian Cup, Turkish Cup, UAE President's Cup)		League cup (Note: Includes Ligakupa, UAE League Cup)		Continental		Other		Total	
Club	Season	Division	Apps	Goals	Apps	Goals	Apps	Goals	Apps	Goals	Apps	Goals	Apps	Goals
Debrecen	2004–05	Nemzeti Bajnokság I	2	0	0	0	0	0	0	0	0	0	2	0
Debrecen	2005–06	Nemzeti Bajnokság I	10	2	3	0	0	0	1	0	0	0	14	4
Debrecen	2006–07	Nemzeti Bajnokság I	23	7	3	0	0	0	2 (Note: Appearances in UEFA Champions League)	0	0	0	28	7
Debrecen	2007–08	Nemzeti Bajnokság I	13	5	1	0	0	0	2	0	0	0	16	5
Debrecen	Total		48	14	7	2	0	0	5	0	0	0	60	16
PSV	2007–08	Eredivisie	17	3	0	0	—		5	0	—		22	3
PSV	2008–09	Eredivisie	32	11	1	0	—		5	0	1 (Note: Appearance in Johan Cruyff Shield)	0	38	11
PSV	2009–10	Eredivisie	32	14	3	1	—		12 (Note: Appearances in UEFA Europa League)	2	–		47	17
PSV	2010–11	Eredivisie	33	16	3	1	—		13	7	—		49	24
PSV	Total		114	44	7	2	—		35	9	1	0	157	55
Anzhi Makhachkala	2011–12	Russian Premier League	8	0	0	0	—		—		—		8	0
Dynamo Moscow	2011–12	Russian Premier League	9	0	3	0	—		—		—		12	0
Dynamo Moscow	2012–13	Russian Premier League	27	5	1	0	—		4	0	—		32	5
Dynamo Moscow	2013–14	Russian Premier League	23	1	1	0	—		—		—		24	1
Dynamo Moscow	2014–15	Russian Premier League	29	7	1	0	—		13	0	—		43	7
Dynamo Moscow	2015–16	Russian Premier League	1	0	0	0	—		—		—		1	0
Dynamo Moscow	Total		89	13	6	0	—		17	0	—		112	13
Bursaspor	2015–16	Süper Lig	23	3	2	1	—		—		—		25	4
Al-Wahda	2016–17	UAE Pro League	23	7	0	0	1	0	7 (Note: Appearances in AFC Champions League)	2	0	0	31	9
Al-Wahda	2017–18	UAE Pro League	19	6	0	0	7	1	5	0	4 (Note: Three appearances in Arab Club Champions Cup, one appearance and one goal in UAE Super Cup)	1	35	8
Al-Wahda	Total		42	13	0	0	8	1	12	2	4	1	66	17
Al-Ittihad Kalba	2018–19	UAE Pro League	22	6	0	0	1	0	—		—		23	6
Al-Ittihad Kalba	2019–20	UAE Pro League	14	3	0	0	3	1	—		—		17	4
Al-Ittihad Kalba	Total		36	9	0	0	4	1	—		—		40	10
Debrecen	2020–21	Nemzeti Bajnokság II	26	5	3	0	—		—		—		29	5
Debrecen	2021–22	Nemzeti Bajnokság I	31	8	1	0	—		—		—		32	8
Debrecen	2022–23	Nemzeti Bajnokság I	31	6	2	0	—		—		—		33	6
Debrecen	2023–24	Nemzeti Bajnokság I	33	7	2	0	—		4	1	—		39	8
Debrecen	2024–25	Nemzeti Bajnokság I	32	2	2	1	—		—		—		34	3
Debrecen	2025–26	Nemzeti Bajnokság I	33	6	1	1	—		—		—		34	7
Debrecen	2026–27	Nemzeti Bajnokság I	8	3	0	0	—		4 (Note: Appearances in UEFA Conference League)	1	—		12	4
Debrecen	Total		189	36	11	2	—		8	2	—		203	38
Career total			571	138	35	7	12	2	77	13	5	1	695	159

=== International ===
As of 20 November 2022

Appearances and goals by national team and year
National team	Year	Apps	Goals
Hungary	2007	7	0
Hungary	2008	9	1
Hungary	2009	8	0
Hungary	2010	8	4
Hungary	2011	9	2
Hungary	2012	8	3
Hungary	2013	9	4
Hungary	2014	8	2
Hungary	2015	9	1
Hungary	2016	11	3
Hungary	2017	7	1
Hungary	2018	5	0
Hungary	2019	10	0
Hungary	2022	1	0
Total		109	21

Scores and results list Hungary's goal tally first, score column indicates score after each Dzsudzsák goal.

List of international goals scored by Balázs Dzsudzsák
No.	Date	Venue	Opponent	Score	Result	Competition
1	24 May 2008	Puskás Ferenc Stadion, Budapest, Hungary	Greece	1–1	3–2	Friendly
2	5 June 2010	Amsterdam ArenA, Amsterdam, Netherlands	Netherlands	1–0	1–6	Friendly
3	8 October 2010	Puskás Ferenc Stadion, Budapest, Hungary	San Marino	7–0	8–0	UEFA Euro 2012 qualification
4	12 October 2010	Olympic Stadium, Helsinki, Finland	Finland	2–1	2–1	UEFA Euro 2012 qualification
5	17 November 2010	Sóstói Stadion, Székesfehérvár, Hungary	Lithuania	2–0	2–0	Friendly
6	10 August 2011	Puskás Ferenc Stadion, Budapest, Hungary	Iceland	3–0	4–0	Friendly
7	11 November 2011	Puskás Ferenc Stadion, Budapest, Hungary	Liechtenstein	3–0	5–0	Friendly
8	1 June 2012	Generali Arena, Prague, Czech Republic	Czech Republic	1–0	2–1	Friendly
9	15 August 2012	Puskás Ferenc Stadion, Budapest, Hungary	Israel	1–0	1–1	Friendly
10	11 September 2012	Puskás Ferenc Stadion, Budapest, Hungary	Netherlands	1–1	1–4	2014 FIFA World Cup qualification
11	22 March 2013	Puskás Ferenc Stadion, Budapest, Hungary	Romania	2–1	2–2	2014 FIFA World Cup qualification
12	14 August 2013	Puskás Ferenc Stadion, Budapest, Hungary	Czech Republic	1–1	1–1	Friendly
13	10 September 2013	Puskás Ferenc Stadion, Budapest, Hungary	Estonia	5–1	5–1	2014 FIFA World Cup qualification
14	15 October 2013	Amsterdam ArenA, Amsterdam, Netherlands	Netherlands	1–4	1–8	2014 FIFA World Cup qualification
15	22 May 2014	Nagyerdei Stadion, Debrecen, Hungary	Denmark	1–0	2–2	Friendly
16	11 October 2014	Arena Națională, Bucharest, Romania	Romania	1–1	1–1	UEFA Euro 2016 qualification
17	5 June 2015	Nagyerdei Stadion, Debrecen, Hungary	Lithuania	2–0	4–0	Friendly
18	26 March 2016	Groupama Arena, Budapest, Hungary	Croatia	1–1	1–1	Friendly
19	22 June 2016	Parc Olympique Lyonnais, Lyon, France	Portugal	2–1	3–3	UEFA Euro 2016
20	22 June 2016	Parc Olympique Lyonnais, Lyon, France	Portugal	3–2	3–3	UEFA Euro 2016
21	31 August 2017	Groupama Arena, Budapest, Hungary	Latvia	3–1	3–1	2018 FIFA World Cup qualification

== Honours ==
Debrecen

- Hungarian League: 2004–05, 2005–06, 2006–07
- Hungarian Cup: 2007–08
- Hungarian Super Cup: 2005, 2006, 2007
- Hungarian Second Division: 2020–21

PSV

- Eredivisie: 2007–08
- Johan Cruijff Shield: 2008

Al Wahda

- UAE President's Cup: 2016–17
- UAE League Cup: 2017–18
- UAE Super Cup: 2017, 2018

Individual

- Hungarian Football Federation Player of the Year: 2010
- Hungarian Footballer of the Year (Golden Ball): 2010, 2014
- Megyei Príma: 2015
- Nemzeti Bajnokság I Goal of the Month: October 2025

Records

- Most assists in the Eredivisie: 2009–10 (16 assists)

== See also ==
- List of footballers with 100 or more caps
