= Otman Bakkal =

Dutch footballer (born 1985)

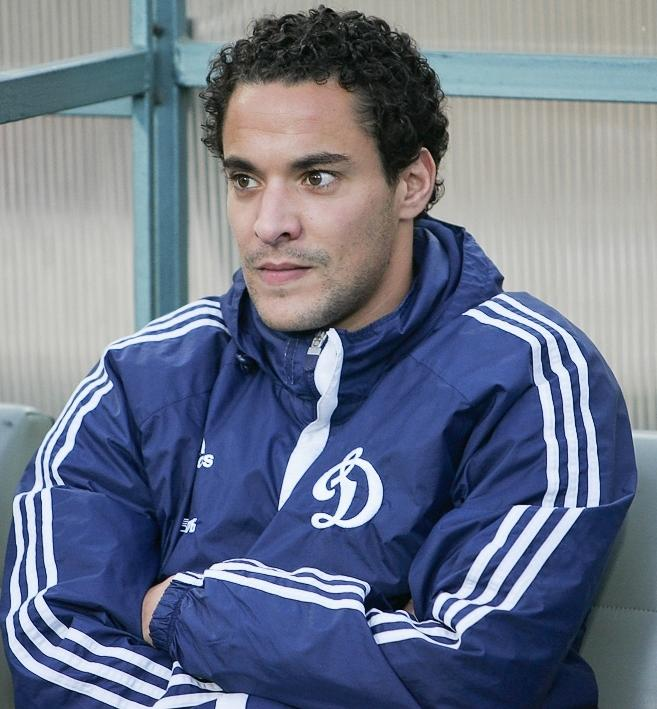
- Bakkal with Dynamo Moscow in 2012

Personal information
- Date of birth: 27 February 1985 (age 41)
- Place of birth: Eindhoven, Netherlands
- Position: Attacking midfielder

Youth career
- 1996–2003: PSV

Senior career*
Years	Team	Apps	(Gls)
2003–2012	PSV	118	(25)
2004–2005	→ Den Bosch (loan)	6	(0)
2005–2006	→ Eindhoven (loan)	33	(8)
2006–2007	→ Twente (loan)	31	(3)
2011–2012	→ Feyenoord (loan)	29	(9)
2012–2013	Dynamo Moscow	4	(0)
2013–2014	Feyenoord	8	(0)
Total		229	(45)

International career
2006–2007	Netherlands U21	13	(3)
2009	Netherlands	1	(0)
- * Club domestic league appearances and goals

Otman Bakkal (born 27 February 1985) is a Dutch former professional footballer who played as an attacking midfielder.

Bakkal was born in the Netherlands to Moroccan parents. He began his career at PSV before moving on loan to Den Bosch, Eindhoven, Twente, and Feyenoord. After signing for Dynamo Moscow permanently in summer 2012, Bakkal returned to Feyenoord one year later. A youth international for the Netherlands, he played once for the senior team in 2009.

== Club career ==
=== Netherlands ===
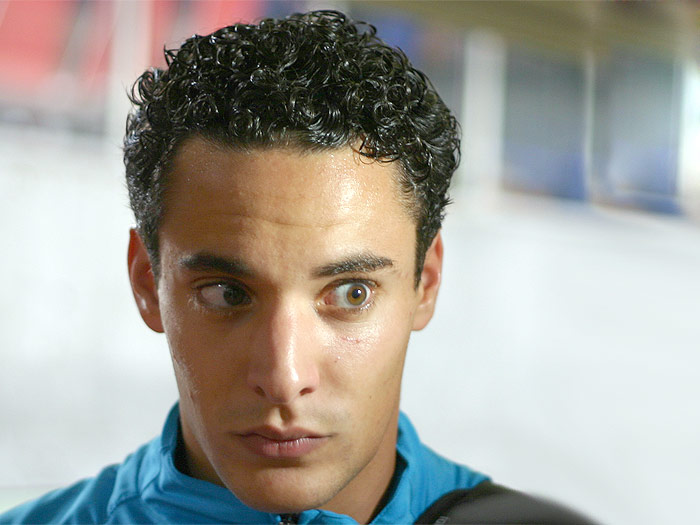
Bakkal in 2007.

Bakkal made his senior debut for PSV during the 2003–04 season in a 3–0 UEFA Cup victory against Auxerre. Three days later, on 28 March 2004, he made his league debut and the first senior start of his career in a 3–1 loss against Willem II. He signed a new three-year deal with PSV in May 2004.

Over the next three seasons, Bakkal would not get any playing time at PSV. Instead, he was loaned out to Den Bosch, Eindhoven and Twente.

Following the 2006–07 season, Bakkal rejoined PSV and saw regular first team action. In November 2010, he was bitten in the shoulder by Luis Suárez during a goalless draw against Ajax. That incident caused Suárez to be suspended for seven matches.

During the 2010–11 season, Bakkal was loaned to Feyenoord, having lost any expectation of regular playing time with PSV. He displayed impressive form and drew the interest of then-Premier League club Swansea City. Instead, he joined Russian club Dynamo Moscow for the 2012–13 season.

=== Later career ===
One year after leaving the Netherlands for Russia, Bakkal returned to the Eredivisie to sign for former loan club Feyenoord, signing a one-year contract running until 30 June 2014. At the end of the 2013–14 season, his contract was subsequently allowed to expire.

In March 2016, Bakkal announced he was not looking for a new club anymore after two years as a free agent, effectively retiring from football.

== International career ==
Bakkal played at the 2007 UEFA European Under-21 Football Championship and the 2008 Summer Olympics. He made his debut for the senior national team in 2009, coming on as a substitute for Rafael van der Vaart in a friendly match against Paraguay. He played the final six minutes of the game, and it was his only appearance, giving him the shortest career in the Netherlands national team ever.

== Career statistics ==
Appearances and goals by club, season and competition
Club	Season	League			National cup (Note: Includes KNVB Cup)		Europe		Other		Total	
Club	Season	Division	Apps	Goals	Apps	Goals	Apps	Goals	Apps	Goals	Apps	Goals
PSV	2003–04	Eredivisie	2	0	0	0	1 (Note: Appearance(s) in UEFA Cup)	0	—		3	0
PSV	2007–08	Eredivisie	31	8	0	0	9 (Note: Four appearances in UEFA Champions League, five appearances and one goal in UEFA Cup)	1	1 (Note: Appearance in Johan Cruyff Shield)	0	41	9
PSV	2008–09	Eredivisie	28	5	0	0	6 (Note: Appearances in UEFA Champions League)	0	—		34	5
PSV	2009–10	Eredivisie	31	11	3	0	12 (Note: Appearance(s) in UEFA Europa League)	1	—		46	12
PSV	2010–11	Eredivisie	25	1	3	0	11	0	—		39	1
PSV	2011–12	Eredivisie	1	0	—		0	0	—		1	0
PSV	Total		118	25	6	0	39	2	1	0	164	27
Den Bosch (loan)	2004–05	Eredivisie	6	0	0	0	—		—		6	0
Eindhoven (loan)	2005–06	Eerste Divisie	33	8	3	3	—		—		36	11
Twente (loan)	2006–07	Eredivisie	31	3	2	1	4 (Note: Two appearances in UEFA Intertoto Cup, two appearances in UEFA Cup)	0	1 (Note: Appearance in Eredivisie European play-offs)	0	36	11
Feyenoord (loan)	2011–12	Eredivisie	29	9	2	1	—		—		31	10
Dynamo Moscow	2012–13	Russian Premier League	4	0	0	0	1	0	—		5	0
Feyenoord	2013–14	Eredivisie	8	0	1	1	—		—		9	1
Career total			229	45	14	6	44	2	2	0	289	53
