= Ibrahim Afellay =

Dutch footballer (born 1986)

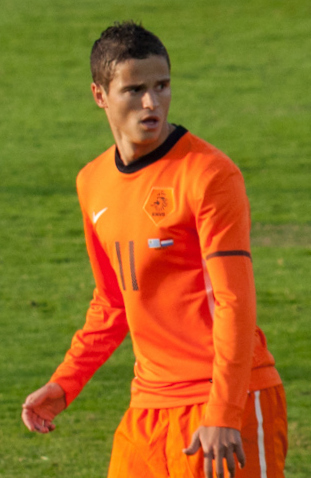
- Afellay with the Netherlands in 2011

Personal information
- Full name: Ibrahim Afellay
- Date of birth: 2 April 1986 (age 40)
- Place of birth: Utrecht, Netherlands
- Height: 1.80 m (5 ft 11 in)
- Positions: Attacking midfielder; winger

Youth career
- 1990–1995: USV Elinkwijk
- 1996–2004: PSV Eindhoven

Senior career*
| Years | Team | Apps | (Gls) |
| 2004–2010 | PSV Eindhoven | 159 | (35) |
| 2010–2015 | Barcelona | 21 | (2) |
| 2012–2013 | → Schalke 04 (loan) | 10 | (2) |
| 2014–2015 | → Olympiacos (loan) | 19 | (4) |
| 2015–2019 | Stoke City | 49 | (2) |
| 2019–2020 | PSV Eindhoven | 3 | (0) |
| Total | | 261 | (45) |

International career
| 2007–2016 | Netherlands | 53 | (7) |
Medal record
Representing Netherlands
Men's football
FIFA World Cup
| Runner-up | 2010 South Africa | Team |
- * Club domestic league appearances and goals

Ibrahim Afellay (Arabic: إبراهيم أفيلاي; born 2 April 1986) is a Dutch former professional footballer who played as an attacking midfielder or winger. He currently works for Dutch broadcaster NOS as a football pundit.

He played youth football at Elinkwijk before joining the PSV Eindhoven youth academy at age 10. After debuting in 2004, he represented PSV for eight seasons, helping them to four Eredivisie titles before moving to Barcelona for €3 million in January 2011. Rarely used by Barcelona and marred by injury, he was loaned to Schalke 04 and Olympiacos before signing for Stoke City in 2015. Afellay spent three seasons with Stoke before ending his career back at PSV.

Making his Netherlands national team debut in 2007, Afellay appeared at the 2010 World Cup, contributing to the Dutch side finishing in second place in the tournament. He was also present at Euro 2008 and Euro 2012, making over 50 appearances in total.

== Early life ==
Afellay is of Moroccan Riffian descent; his parents left their hometown Al Hoceima in the 1960s to work in the Netherlands. He grew up in Overvecht, a neighbourhood in Utrecht with a large immigrant population. Afellay and his brother, Ali, were brought up by their mother, Habiba, after his father died when he was young.

== Club career ==
=== Beginning of career ===
Afellay started to play football at local side VSK, but joined USV Elinkwijk after one season.

=== PSV ===
Afellay left Elinkwijk in 1996 for PSV. Afellay's official debut for PSV was on 4 February 2004 during a KNVB Cup match against NAC Breda at the age of 17. His first Eredivisie fixture followed ten days later against FC Twente. Afellay played one more senior match in the 2003–04 season. He signed a new contract at PSV in May that would run until 2007. In the next season, Afellay got a place in the first eleven against Roda JC in December. But during the winter break training camp in Dubai, he suffered a broken toe. Afellay was unable to play for three months. He played nine matches in total in the 2004–05 season; his most memorable being PSV's final home match against Feyenoord (2–4). Afellay scored twice and provided an assist in the match. He also won the KNVB Cup after appearing as a substitute in the final against Willem II, which PSV won 4–0.

In the 2005–06 season, Afellay established himself as a first-team regular at PSV. He formed a midfield partnership with Timmy Simons and Phillip Cocu. In his first four matches (Johan Cruijff Shield and league), Afellay received four yellow cards, resulting in an immediate suspension. In September, Afellay made his Champions League debut against Schalke 04 (1–0 win). Overall, he managed to play a total of 23 league matches during a season hit with a string of minor injuries. PSV won the Eredivisie in 2006; Afellay's second title in a row. In the next season, he played 27 league matches and scored six goals for PSV. The team won the Eredivisie on a single goal difference after defeating Vitesse (5–1) in the last league round. Afellay made the third goal of the match. For his performances that year, Afellay was awarded the Johan Cruijff Award for being the most promising youngster in The Netherlands.

Afellay started the 2007–08 season well by scoring the first goal and assisted the second in the away match against Heracles Almelo (0–2). A month later, a broken toe forced Afellay into a two-month recovery. He extended his contract until 2011 in December. Afellay played 24 Eredivisie matches in the 2007–08 season. He missed second-to-final match against FC Twente in which PSV could seal the championship, but the team failed to do so. The league title was eventually won in the last match against Vitesse with Afellay in the team. The start of the 2008–09 season was troublesome for Afellay when he received less holiday then desired after Euro 2008. His season started well though, with the Johan Cruyff Shield victory against Feyenoord (0–2) and three goals in the opening two Eredivisie matches. Afellay scored 13 league goals in total, including the only goal in the home match against Feyenoord in December. The 2008–09 season, in which PSV finished fourth, ended prematurely after he suffered an injury in April.

For the 2009–10 season, Afellay shifted to a more defensive midfield position under new coach Fred Rutten. In February, Afellay was promoted to second captain of the team. But because first captain Timmy Simons was mostly on the bench that season, Afellay was effectively the new captain. In March, Afellay received a three-match ban after video evidence showed foul play against Eyong Enoh in the match against Ajax. PSV and Afellay ended the Eredivisie season in third. In the summer, he was officially appointed as team captain. In October, Afellay announced he would not sign a new contract with PSV. With the contract nearing its end, PSV was willing to sell in the winter break. On 15 November, it was FC Barcelona who agreed on a deal with PSV. Afellay signed a contract for four and a half years. In his last PSV match against Roda JC, he was granted a farewell by the fans.

=== Barcelona ===
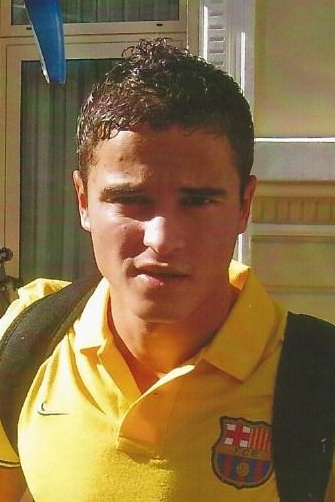
Afellay with Barcelona in 2011

After completing the €3 million transfer, Afellay signed a contract for four and a half years at FC Barcelona. He made his Blaugrana debut on 5 January 2011 in the Copa del Rey match against Athletic Bilbao, replacing David Villa in injury time. He continued to play 28 Barcelona matches in his first season, of which 18 were as a substitute. Afellay was given his first start on 19 January 2011 against Real Betis in the Copa del Rey. His first goal also occurred in the Copa del Rey against UD Almería in February. Afellay scored his first league goal in a 3–1 away win against Málaga CF on the last day of the season. The 2010–11 season ended in the title win for Barcelona and the fifth league championship for Afellay overall. He made his Champions League debut for Barcelona against Arsenal and also went on to appear in the quarter-finals against Shakhtar Donetsk. He then played a vital role in the first match of the semi-finals against archrivals Real Madrid by coming on as a late substitute, dribbling past Marcelo into the box and assisting Lionel Messi for Barcelona's crucial opening goal in their 2–0 away victory. Afellay and Barcelona eventually won the Champions League after beating Manchester United (3–1). Afellay came on in the 90th minute of the final.

Afellay had a minor hamstring injury in the 2011–12 pre-season, therefore missing out on the Supercopa de España matches against Real Madrid. He returned in time for one Champions League and one La Liga match before suffering an anterior cruciate ligament injury during training in September. After undergoing surgery, Afellay went through a seven-month recovery period. On 29 April, he returned to the field as a substitute in the 71st minute replacing teammate Sergio Busquets against Rayo Vallecano on a 7–0 away trashing win for the Catalan side. Although he appeared in two more La Liga fixtures, manager Pep Guardiola did not call-up Afellay for the major matches against Chelsea and Real Madrid.

==== Schalke 04 (loan) ====
In the build-up for the 2012–13 season, Barcelona manager Tito Vilanova notified Afellay of his decreased playing time in the upcoming year. It prompted him to accept a loan offer from FC Schalke 04 on 31 August. He was reunited with Jefferson Farfán and coach Huub Stevens. Afellay made his debut the next day against FC Augsburg. He scored four goals at Schalke, including the opening goal in the Revierderby against Borussia Dortmund (1–2) and a goal against Arsenal in the Champions League. Afellay played his last Schalke match on 10 November; he picked up a muscle injury in a Dutch national team friendly against Germany a few days later. The injury prevented Afellay from playing until January, when he suffered a similar muscle strain in a friendly against Al Sadd SC. With the recovery this time taking the remainder of the season, Afellay returned to The Netherlands after expressing his discontent with the medical treatment at Schalke 04. Although both parties kept in contact, Afellay did not return to Gelsenkirchen anymore after the injury; a move that led to criticism from Schalke's general manager Horst Heldt.

Afellay returned to Spain in May to evaluate his problems with the FC Barcelona medical staff. He decided to start training two weeks earlier than the rest of the squad in order to focus on his recovery. But in August, Afellay had to undergo another surgery on a thigh injury in Barcelona, sidelining him for another four months. Although he was originally not given a squad number, Barcelona assigned Afellay the number 19 jersey after the transfer window deadline had passed.

==== Olympiacos (loan) ====
On 10 August 2014 Olympiacos announced the acquisition of Afellay on a season long deal. He scored his first goal in the Super League on his debut on 23 August, receiving the ball in the 32nd minute following a pass from Alejandro Domínguez. Afellay enjoyed a successful season in Greece with Olympiacos as they won the league and cup double. At the end of the 2014–15 season, he was released by Barcelona after his injury hit stay at the club.

=== Stoke City ===
Afellay joined Premier League side Stoke City on a two-year contract on 27 July 2015. He made his debut on 9 August, in a 1–0 defeat against Liverpool at the Britannia Stadium, playing 78 minutes before making way for Peter Odemwingie. He was sent-off against West Bromwich Albion on 29 August 2015, for slapping Craig Gardner. He scored his first goal for Stoke on 1 December 2015 in a 2–0 League Cup victory against Sheffield Wednesday. Afellay scored his first Premier League goal on 13 February 2016 in a 3–1 win against AFC Bournemouth. He scored his second Premier League goal on his 30th birthday in a 2–2 draw with Swansea City on 2 April 2016. On 22 April 2016 Afellay suffered a serious knee injury in training, ruling him out for up to eight months. In total Afellay played 36 times for Stoke in 2015–16 scoring three goals as the side finished in ninth position.

Afellay made his return from injury against Liverpool on 27 December 2016. Afellay signed a two-year contract extension with Stoke on 2 March 2017. He suffered another injury in April 2017 and underwent knee surgery. Afellay managed to make 13 appearances in 2016–17, of which 3 were starts as Stoke finished in 13th position. He returned from injury in September 2017 but was unable to establish himself in Mark Hughes' in 2017–18 team making just six appearances. Afellay then had a training ground bust up with new manager Paul Lambert in March 2018 and was told to stay away from the club. Afellay returned to the club for pre-season ahead of the 2018–19 season and scored in a friendly against Walsall but suffered another long-term knee injury. His contract with Stoke was terminated by mutual consent on 28 January 2019.

=== Return to PSV ===
On 18 June 2019, PSV announced the return of Afellay after nine years.

On 31 January 2021, Afellay announced his retirement from professional football. He stated: "What I wanted has not happened. But I am at peace with it. You know that this moment will come sooner or later. It's fine like this."

== International career ==
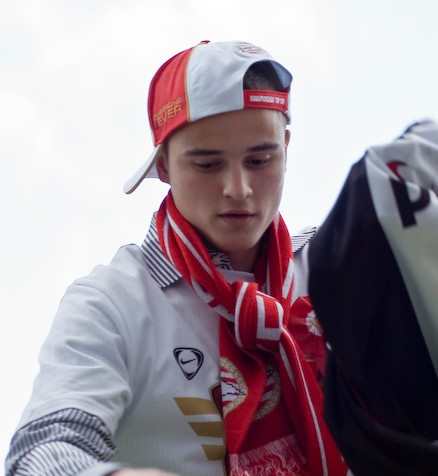
Afellay with PSV in 2008

Afellay and his family are Moroccan Dutch. After both the Moroccan and the Dutch national teams managers selected him for their squads, he was caught in the dilemma to either play for the Moroccan national team, because of his Moroccan descent, or to play for the Dutch team, the Netherlands being his place of birth and residence. He ultimately decided to play for the Dutch national team despite the heavy competition for places in midfield. He made his international debut in a Euro 2008 qualifier against Slovenia on 28 March 2007. He played in the 2008 European Championships as a substitute. Just seconds after replacing Dirk Kuyt in the group match against Italy he nearly scored a goal but his shot hit the top of the crossbar. In their last group match against Romania, he was given a place in the starting eleven alongside Arjen Robben in midfield. On 12 October 2010, Afellay scored his first international goals in a Euro 2012 qualifier against Sweden.

=== 2010 World Cup ===
Afellay was part of the Dutch team for the 2010 World Cup managed by Bert van Marwijk. The player came on as a substitute for their first and second matches in the competition, a 2–0 victory over Denmark and 1–0 victory over Japan respectively, as well as the round of 16 match against Slovakia.

=== Euro 2012 ===
Despite being injured for most of the 2011–12 season, he was included in the Netherlands' Euro 2012 squad. On 2 June 2012, Afellay scored two goals in a 6–0 friendly win over Northern Ireland, which was the Netherlands' final match ahead of the tournament. In the first match of the tournament, his team suffered a 1–0 loss to Denmark. He was part of the starting eleven against Germany as well. After the second loss, the head coach Bert van Marwijk decided to replace him with Rafael van der Vaart.

== Career statistics ==
=== Club ===
Appearances and goals by club, season and competition
| Club | Season | League | | | National cup | | League cup | | Europe | | Other | | Total | |
| Club | Season | Division | Apps | Goals | Apps | Goals | Apps | Goals | Apps | Goals | Apps | Goals | Apps | Goals |
|---|---|---|---|---|---|---|---|---|---|---|---|---|---|---|
| PSV Eindhoven | 2003–04 | Eredivisie | 2 | 0 | 1 | 0 | — | | 0 | 0 | 0 | 0 | 3 | 0 |
| PSV Eindhoven | 2004–05 | Eredivisie | 7 | 2 | 2 | 0 | — | | 0 | 0 | — | | 9 | 2 |
| PSV Eindhoven | 2005–06 | Eredivisie | 23 | 2 | 2 | 0 | — | | 8 (Note: Appearances in UEFA Champions League) | 0 | 1 (Note: Appearances in Johan Cruyff Shield) | 0 | 34 | 2 |
| PSV Eindhoven | 2006–07 | Eredivisie | 27 | 6 | 2 | 0 | — | | 5 | 0 | 0 | 0 | 34 | 6 |
| PSV Eindhoven | 2007–08 | Eredivisie | 24 | 2 | 0 | 0 | — | | 8 | 0 | 1 | 0 | 33 | 2 |
| PSV Eindhoven | 2008–09 | Eredivisie | 28 | 13 | 1 | 0 | — | | 4 | 0 | 1 | 0 | 34 | 13 |
| PSV Eindhoven | 2009–10 | Eredivisie | 29 | 4 | 4 | 1 | — | | 11 (Note: Appearances in UEFA Europa League) | 1 | — | | 44 | 6 |
| PSV Eindhoven | 2010–11 | Eredivisie | 19 | 6 | 1 | 0 | — | | 6 | 1 | — | | 26 | 7 |
| PSV Eindhoven | Total | | 159 | 35 | 13 | 1 | — | | 42 | 2 | 3 | 0 | 217 | 38 |
| Barcelona | 2010–11 | La Liga | 16 | 1 | 6 | 1 | — | | 6 | 0 | — | | 28 | 2 |
| Barcelona | 2011–12 | La Liga | 4 | 0 | 0 | 0 | — | | 1 | 0 | 0 | 0 | 5 | 0 |
| Barcelona | 2013–14 | La Liga | 1 | 0 | 1 | 0 | — | | 0 | 0 | 0 | 0 | 2 | 0 |
| Barcelona | Total | | 21 | 1 | 7 | 1 | — | | 7 | 0 | 0 | 0 | 35 | 2 |
| Schalke 04 (loan) | 2012–13 | Bundesliga | 10 | 2 | 1 | 1 | — | | 4 | 1 | — | | 15 | 4 |
| Olympiacos (loan) | 2014–15 | Super League Greece | 19 | 4 | 2 | 0 | — | | 8 | 2 | — | | 29 | 6 |
| Stoke City | 2015–16 | Premier League | 31 | 2 | 0 | 0 | 5 | 1 | — | | — | | 36 | 3 |
| Stoke City | 2016–17 | Premier League | 12 | 0 | 1 | 0 | 0 | 0 | — | | — | | 13 | 0 |
| Stoke City | 2017–18 | Premier League | 6 | 0 | 0 | 0 | 0 | 0 | — | | — | | 6 | 0 |
| Stoke City | 2018–19 | Championship | 0 | 0 | 0 | 0 | 0 | 0 | — | | — | | 0 | 0 |
| Stoke City | Total | | 49 | 2 | 1 | 0 | 5 | 1 | — | | — | | 55 | 3 |
| Stoke City U23 | 2017–18 | — | — | | — | | — | | — | | 2 (Note: Appearances in EFL Trophy) | 1 | 2 | 1 |
| PSV Eindhoven | 2019–20 | Eredivisie | 3 | 0 | 1 | 0 | — | | 0 | 0 | 0 | 0 | 4 | 0 |
| Career total | | | 261 | 44 | 25 | 3 | 5 | 1 | 61 | 5 | 5 | 1 | 357 | 54 |

=== International ===
Appearances and goals by national team and year
| National team | Year | Apps | Goals |
| National team | Year | Apps | Goals |
|---|---|---|---|
| Netherlands | 2007 | 1 | 0 |
| Netherlands | 2008 | 13 | 0 |
| Netherlands | 2009 | 5 | 0 |
| Netherlands | 2010 | 12 | 2 |
| Netherlands | 2011 | 5 | 1 |
| Netherlands | 2012 | 8 | 2 |
| Netherlands | 2013 | 0 | 0 |
| Netherlands | 2014 | 4 | 1 |
| Netherlands | 2015 | 3 | 0 |
| Netherlands | 2016 | 2 | 1 |
| Total | | 53 | 7 |

Scores and results list the Netherlands' goal tally first, score column indicates score after each Afellay goal.

List of international goals scored by Ibrahim Afellay
| No. | Date | Venue | Cap | Opponent | Score | Result | Competition |
|---|---|---|---|---|---|---|---|
| 1 | 12 October 2010 | Amsterdam ArenA, Amsterdam, Netherlands | 30 | Sweden | 2–0 | 4–1 | UEFA Euro 2012 qualifying |
| 2 | 12 October 2010 | Amsterdam ArenA, Amsterdam, Netherlands | 30 | Sweden | 4–0 | 4–1 | UEFA Euro 2012 qualifying |
| 3 | 25 March 2011 | Stadium Puskás Ferenc, Budapest, Hungary | 33 | Hungary | 2–0 | 4–0 | UEFA Euro 2012 qualifying |
| 4 | 2 June 2012 | Amsterdam ArenA, Amsterdam, Netherlands | 38 | Northern Ireland | 4–0 | 6–0 | Friendly |
| 5 | 2 June 2012 | Amsterdam ArenA, Amsterdam, Netherlands | 38 | Northern Ireland | 5–0 | 6–0 | Friendly |
| 6 | 10 October 2014 | Amsterdam ArenA, Amsterdam, Netherlands | 45 | Kazakhstan | 2–1 | 3–1 | UEFA Euro 2016 qualifying |
| 7 | 25 March 2016 | Amsterdam ArenA, Amsterdam, Netherlands | 52 | France | 2–2 | 2–3 | Friendly |

== Honours ==
PSV

- Eredivisie: 2004–05, 2005–06, 2006–07, 2007–08
- KNVB Cup: 2004–05
- Johan Cruyff Shield: 2008

Barcelona

- La Liga: 2010–11
- Copa del Rey: 2011–12
- UEFA Champions League: 2010–11

Olympiacos

- Super League Greece: 2014–15

Netherlands

- FIFA World Cup runner-up: 2010

Individual

- Johan Cruyff Trophy: 2007
