= Yannick Rymenants =

Belgian footballer

Personal information
- Full name: Yannick Rymenants
- Date of birth: 23 January 1989 (age 37)
- Place of birth: Lier, Belgium
- Height: 1.78 m (5 ft 10 in)
- Position: Defender

Youth career
- Lierse
- –2003: Westerlo
- 2003–2008: PSV

Senior career*
| Years | Team | Apps | (Gls) |
| 2008–2010 | PSV | 0 | (0) |
| 2010–2012 | Sint-Truiden | 25 | (2) |
| 2012–2015 | Heist | 81 | (5) |
| 2015–2019 | KFC Duffel | | |
| 2019–2020 | FC Berlaar-Heikant | | |
- * Club domestic league appearances and goals as of 2 January 2016

Yannick Rymenants (born 23 January 1989) is a Belgian footballer who plays as a defender.
