= Eelco Horsten =

Dutch footballer

Personal information
- Full name: Eelco Horsten
- Date of birth: 31 December 1989 (age 36)
- Place of birth: Veldhoven, Netherlands
- Height: 1.81 m (5 ft 11 in)
- Position: Right back

Youth career
- UNA
- PSV

Senior career*
Years	Team	Apps	(Gls)
2010–2011	Roda JC	4	(0)
2011–2015	UNA		

International career
2006	Netherlands U17	2	(0)
2007	Netherlands U18	2	(0)
2006–2008	Netherlands U19	10	(0)
2008	Netherlands U20	1	(0)
- * Club domestic league appearances and goals

Eelco Horsten (born 31 December 1989) is a Dutch retired footballer, who played as a right back. He played in the PSV academy and for Roda JC in the Eredivisie.

In 2011, Horsten left Roda for amateur and hoemtown club UNA citing he found the professional football world too tough.

== International career ==
Horsten was capped twice by the Netherlands national under-18 football team and 10 times by the U19s.
