= Rens van Eijden =

Dutch footballer (born 1988)

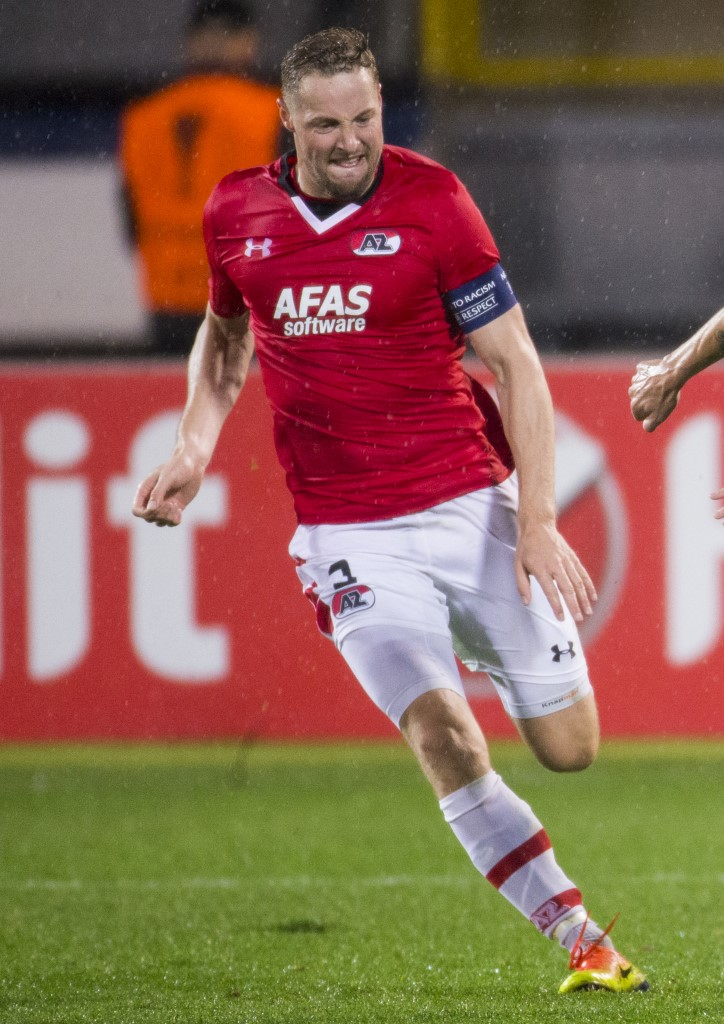
- Van Eijden playing for AZ in September 2016

Personal information
- Date of birth: 3 March 1988 (age 38)
- Place of birth: Oss, Netherlands
- Height: 1.88 m (6 ft 2 in)
- Position: Centre back

Youth career
- RKSV
- 1999–2006: PSV

Senior career*
Years	Team	Apps	(Gls)
2007–2009	PSV	0	(0)
2008–2009	→ Willem II (loan)	25	(2)
2009–2016	NEC	189	(8)
2016–2018	AZ	26	(0)
2016–2018	Jong AZ	14	(0)
2018–2022	NEC	66	(6)

International career
2008–2009	Netherlands U20	8	(0)
2009–2010	Netherlands U21	5	(0)
2008	Netherlands B	1	(0)
- * Club domestic league appearances and goals

Rens van Eijden (Dutch pronunciation: [ˈrɛns fɑn ˈɛidə(n)]; (Note: In isolation, van is pronounced [vɑn].) born 3 March 1988) is a Dutch former footballer who played as a centre back. Known for his composure, defensive intelligence, and leadership on the field, Van Eijden enjoyed a career spanning over a decade in Dutch football. Developing his skills in PSV Eindhoven youth academy, he went on to make a name for himself at clubs like NEC Nijmegen and AZ Alkmaar, where he became a reliable presence in the backline.

== Club career ==
=== PSV Eindhoven ===
Born in Oss, Netherlands, van Eijden began his career at RKSV Margriet, a club based in his hometown. Then, van Eijden joined PSV Eindhoven youth system in 1999, where he started his career there and after progressing through the ranks, he was promoted to Jong PSV Eindhoven in September 2004.

On 11 April 2007, van Eijden was called up to the senior team for the first time by then Manager Ronald Koeman and he made his debut for PSV Eindhoven in the UEFA Champions League-match against Liverpool. Van Eijden came on as a substitute in the 72nd minute for the Ivorian striker, Arouna Koné. After the match, van Eijden reflected on his PSV Eindhoven debut, admitting he didn't expect it. This turns out to be his only appearance for the side, as he spent his PSV Eindhoven in the reserves.

In February 2008, van Eijden was officially promoted to the PSV Eindhoven and began training with the side. In April 2008, van Eijden signed a contract with the club, keeping him until 2011.

=== Willem II (loan) ===
In the summer of 2008, he left PSV on loan, to play for Willem II for the rest of the season, which also obtained a transfer right option. Upon joining Willem II, van Eijden believed the move would benefited him, stating it would be good for developing his career.

Van Eijden made his Willem II debut (as well as making his debut in the Eredivisie), where he started the whole game, in a 3–1 win over NAC Breda on 14 September 2008. It wasn't until on 13 December 2008 when he scored his first goal for the club, in a 2–1 loss against NEC Nijmegen. Two weeks later, on 27 December 2008, he scored, in a 3–2 win over Sparta Rotterdam.

Since making his Willem II debut, van Eijden appeared in every match for the side until he sustained knee injury and had to be substituted after playing 70 minutes, in a 2–0 loss against Vitesse on 31 January 2009. After returning to the first team, van Eijden went on to make 23 appearances for the Tilburgers.

=== N.E.C. ===
In April 2009, he signed a four-year contract with N.E.C. He joined the side after finishing his loan spell at Willem II which ran until the end of the 2008–09 Eredivisie season and was given number 3 shirt ahead of the new season.

van Eijden made his NEC Nijmegen debut, where he started the whole game, in a 2–0 loss against Feyenoord in the opening game of the season. It wasn't until on 27 January 2010 when he scored his first goal for the club, in a 3–2 loss against Ajax in the quarter–final of the KNVB Beker. However, despite suffering from injury during the season and subsequently placed on the substitute bench for the rest of the season, van Eijden finished his first season at NEC Nijmegen, making the total of 27 appearances and scoring once. Reflecting to his first season, van Eijden cited his poor performance on his personal problems.

In the 2010–11 season, van Eijden started the season well when he set up a goal for Ramon Zomer, who scored the only goal in the game, in a 1–0 win over VVV-Venlo. However, van Eijden found himself out of the first team, due to sidelined over injuries and being on the substitute bench. Despite this, he went to make the total of 15 appearances in all competitions. In his first two seasons at NEC, van Eijden faced criticism from the club's supporters, due to his poor performance.

In the 2011–12 season, van Eijden began to established himself in the starting eleven in the defence (and continued to remain in the starting eleven for the next four seasons until his departure). and started every match despite his brief injury. During a 1–0 win over Feyenoord on 5 November 2011, van Eijden was punched by Guyon Fernandez after Fernandez accused van Eijden of racism, serving a six match ban for assault. As a result, van Eijden was cleared of racism and the Dutch FA did not take action against him. van Eijden, himself, denied claims that he racially abused Fernandez. It wasn't until on 19 February 2012 when he scored his first goal of the season, in a 4–1 loss against Ajax. After briefly sidelined over suspension and injuries on four occasions, van Eijden made the total of 31 appearances and scoring once in all competitions. At the end of the 2011–12 season, that saw N.E.C. unsuccessfully won a UEFA Europa League spot, van Eijden was awarded Player of the Season and signed a contract extension with the club, keeping him until 2016.

In the 2012–13 season, van Eijden continued to be in the first team and started the season when he played 90 minutes and kept a clean sheet, in a 2–0 win over Heerenveen in the first match of the season. He then scored his first goal of the season on 27 January 2013, in a 2–1 win over FC Groningen. Although he was booked three times during the season, van Eijden played every singles matches this season, making the total of 35 appearances. He was also won Player of the Year Award, voted by the club's supporters.

In the 2013–14 season, van Eijden was captain for the side in absence of Ryan Koolwijk and played his first match as captain in the opening game of the season, which saw N.E.C. lose 4–1 to Groningen. Following the match, he accepted his responsibilities over the loss. He continued to remain his first team place in the back four since the start of the season. He then scored his first goal for the club on 20 October 2013, in a 1–1 draw against Heracles Almelo. After being absent over illness, he returned to the first team on 1 December 2013, in a 3–2 win over AZ. and scored again, in a 3–1 win over ADO Den Haag on 19 January 2014. Two weeks later, on 5 February 2014, he scored again, in a 1–1 draw against NAC Breda. After being suspended three times, including his sending off on two occasions, van Eijden was unable to help the club avoid relegation after losing 4–1 to Sparta Rotterdam on aggregate in the play–offs. Despite the relegation, van Eijden was awarded Player of the Season for the second time in his N.E.C. Nijmegen career. At the end of the 2013–14 season, van Eijden made a total of 36 appearances and scoring 3 times in all competitions.

Ahead of the 2014–15 season, van Eijden's future at N.E.C. Nijmegen was uncertain following the club's relegation from Eredivisie. By the end of the summer transfer window, he managed to stay at the club. At the start of the season, van Eijden was given the captaincy by Manager Ruud Brood and continued to established himself in the back four defence. Under his leadership, van Eijden helped the go on an unbeaten run between 29 August 2014 and 16 January 2015 with 13 wins and then another unbeaten run between 23 January 2015 and 1 May 2015 with 17 wins. He then scored his first goal of the season on 24 November 2014, in a 1–1 draw against Jong Ajax. After missing out one game over sickness, van Eijden scored twice on 20 March 2015, in a 4–1 win over MVV Maastricht. His performance against MVV Maastricht earned him Player of the Week. The club confirmed their promotion to Eredivisie after beating Sparta Rotterdam 1–0 on 3 April 2015. After helping the side promotion to the Eredivisie, van Eijden made a total of 40 appearances and scoring 3 times in all competitions for the 2014–15 season.

In the 2015–16 season, van Eijden continued to remain the club's captain for the side at the start of the season. He also did well when he set up a goal for Navarone Foor, in a 1–0 win over Willem II on 28 August 2015. His leadership in the first half of the season led the side to make a great start back in the league despite the changes of selection made. However, in December 2015, it was hinted that van Eijden may leave the club over his high wages. The following month, N.E.C. Nijmegen made an agreement with Dynamo Moscow to sign van Eijden. It came after when Dynamo Moscow had their bid rejected by N.E.C. Nijmegen in their first attempt before accepting for the second one and his desire to leave the club. This led a strained relationship between van Eijden and the club's director of football Bart van Ingen. However, the move was broken down after the negotiations over a change of heart moving to Dynamo Moscow on two occasions. While on the negotiations, van Eiljden found himself losing his captaincy to Brad Jones in his absence. So after all these happening, he stayed at NEC for the rest of the season and returned to the selection, leading him to return his duties as captain for the rest of the season. In his last home appearance in a 2–1 loss against Roda JC on 2 May 2016, he was given bouquet and pictures as part of the farewell gift. Despite being suspended twice and suffered an injury later in the season, van Eijden finished the 2015–16 season, making the total of 28 appearances in all competitions.

=== AZ Alkmaar ===
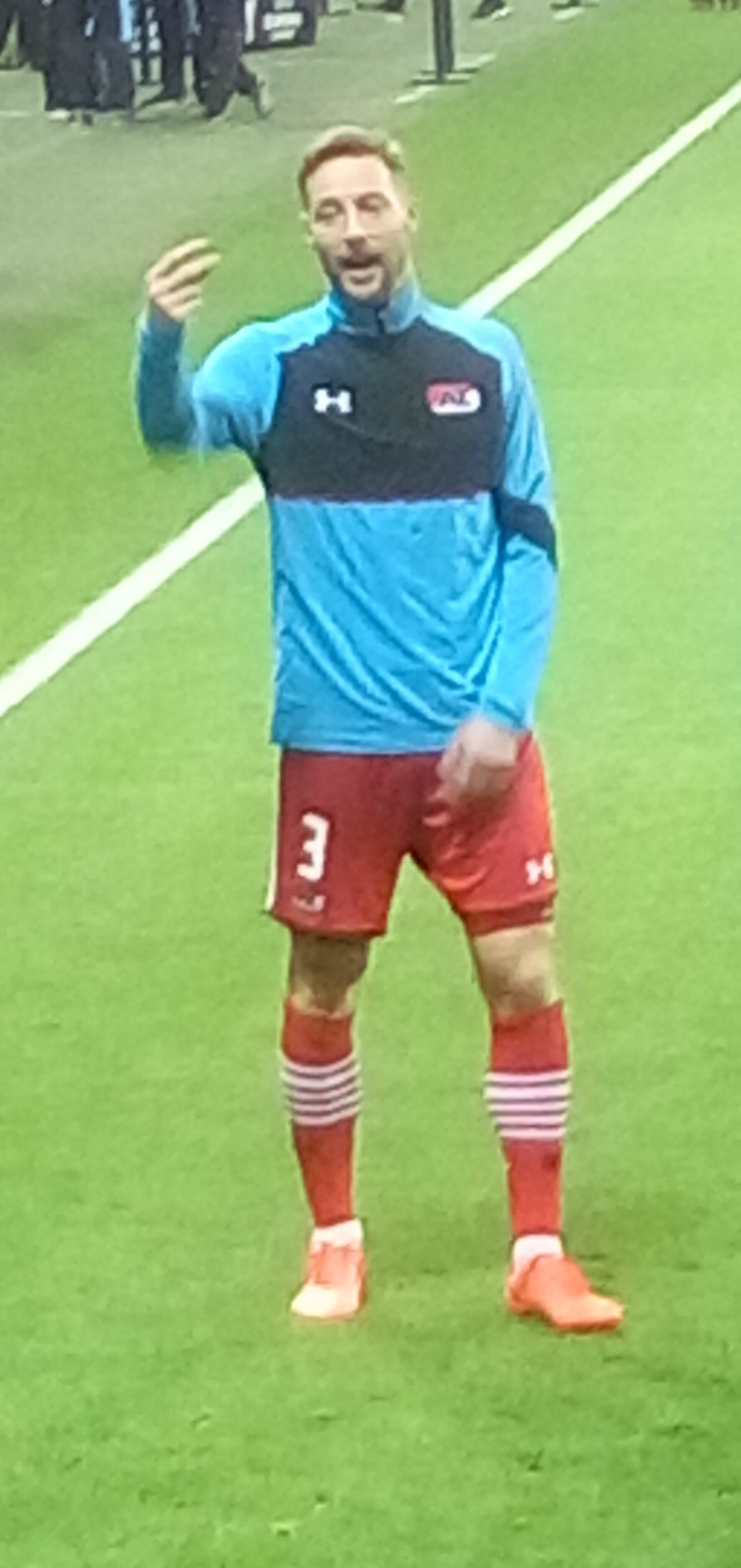
van Eijden training ahead of a UEFA Europa League match against Olympique Lyonnais.

It was announced on 4 April 2016 that AZ Alkmaar and N.E.C. Nijmegen made an agreement to sign van Eijden. The move was confirmed on 8 April 2016, where he joined the side in the summer of 2016 on a four–year contract. It came after when van Eijden would be leaving the club at the end of the 2015–16 season. Upon joining the club, van Eijden was given a number three shirt ahead of the new season.

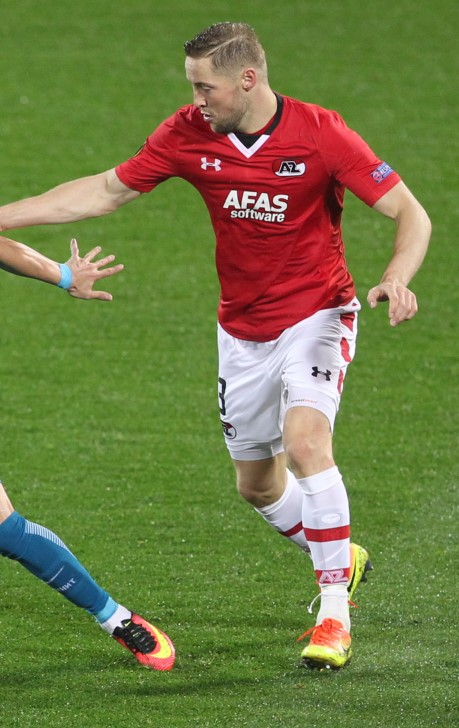
van Eijden defending for the side during a UEFA Europa League Match against Zenit Saint Petersburg.

Although he briefly breaking his nose in the pre–season friendly match against Hertha BSC, van Eijden made his AZ debut in a third round second leg of the UEFA Europa League against PAS Giannina, in a 2–0 win to send them through to the next round. Three days later, on 7 August 2017, he made his league debut for the side, where he set up one of the goals, in a 2–2 draw against SC Heerenveen. Since making his debut, van Eijden established in the centre–back position with Ron Vlaar, a comment he said was his reason moving to AZ. Following Vlaar's injury, van Eijden captained the side for the first time, in a 1–1 draw against Sparta Rotterdam. However, he suffered a groin injury that kept him out throughout 2016. After returning to the reserve side from injury, van Eijden returned to the side from injury, as well as, captain, in a 2–1 loss against Vitesse on 29 January 2017. However, in a 3–2 win over Cambuur in the semi–finals of the KNVB Cup on 2 March 2017, he was sent–off in extra time for a professional foul. After serving a three match ban, van Eijden, nevertheless, started and played in the final of the KNVB Cup against Vitesse, which AZ lost 2–0. After the match, van Eijden reflected on the loss, quoting: "After the final, we have had a day off, and I used to spend a lot of time on the bed and did not do much. As a professional, you're used to turning the button back quickly. The pain lasted for a few days." Towards the end of the season, he remained captain in absence of Vlaar, before a groin operation ended his season ahead of the Europa League Qualification's Play–offs. Despite this, van Eijden went on to make the total of 38 appearances in his first season at AZ Alkmaar.

In the 2017–18 season, van Eijden found himself in a new competition with Vlaar, Pantelis Hatzidiakos and Stijn Wuytens. As a result, he was demoted to the reserve side.

== International career ==
Having represented for Netherlands U19 and Netherlands U20, van Eijden was called up for the Netherlands B in November 2008 and made one appearance for the side against Sweden U21.

In August 2009, van Eijden was called up by Netherlands U21 for the first time. He made his Netherlands U21 debut on 11 August 2009, where he played 45 minutes, in a 0–0 draw against England U21. van Eijden went on to make 7 appearances for the U21 side.

== Personal life ==
Outside of football, van Eijden said when he's not playing football, he said his other passions are tennis, video games and cars.
