= Olivier ter Horst =

Dutch footballer

Personal information
- Full name: Olivier ter Horst
- Date of birth: 6 April 1989 (age 37)
- Place of birth: Nijmegen, Netherlands
- Height: 1.84 m (6 ft 1/2 in)
- Position: Centre back

Team information
- Current team: BVC '21

Youth career
- Oranje Blauw
- Quick 1888
- Vitesse/AGOVV
- 2004–2009: PSV

Senior career*
Years	Team	Apps	(Gls)
2009–2012	Heracles	12	(0)
2012–2013	Helmond Sport	28	(1)

International career^{‡}
2004	Netherlands U15	1	(0)
2004-2005	Netherlands U16	3	(0)
2005-2006	Netherlands U17	12	(4)
2007	Netherlands U18	2	(0)
2007-2008	Netherlands U19	8	(0)
2008-2009	Netherlands U20	5	(0)
- * Club domestic league appearances and goals as of 25 May 2013 (UTC) ‡ National team caps and goals as of 10 January 2010 (UTC)

Olivier ter Horst (born 6 April 1989 in Nijmegen) is a Dutch retired footballer who played as a defender.

== Club career ==
After playing for amateur sides Oranje Blauw and Quick 1888 and the academies of Vitesse/AGOVV and PSV, Ter Horst moved to Heracles in 2009. He later signed for Eerste Divisie outfit Helmond Sport. After the 2012/13 season, he retired from professional football as he wanted to focus on his public career and he joined amateur side BVC'12.

== International career ==
Ter Horst played 12 games for the Netherlands national under-17 football team and 8 for the U19s.
