= Mike Zonneveld =

Dutch footballer

Personal information
- Date of birth: 27 October 1980 (age 46)
- Place of birth: Leiden, Netherlands
- Height: 1.81 m (5 ft 11 in)
- Position: Left back

Youth career
- 1986–1990: SJC
- 1991–1997: Ajax

Senior career*
Years	Team	Apps	(Gls)
1999–2000	Go Ahead Eagles	18	(2)
2000–2004	NEC	94	(8)
2004–2007	NAC Breda	55	(11)
2007–2010	PSV	26	(2)
2009–2010	→ Groningen (loan)	21	(0)
2010–2011	AEL Limassol	18	(1)
2011–2013	NAC Breda	2	(0)
Total		234	(24)

International career
1999–2001	Netherlands U21	9	(0)
- * Club domestic league appearances and goals

Mike Zonneveld (born 27 October 1980) is a Dutch former professional footballer who played as a left back.

== Career ==
=== Early years ===
Zonneveld started playing football with the amateurs of SJC in Noordwijk at the age of five. He soon caught the attention of the scouts of Ajax and at a young age he joined their academy, where he was considered a promising talent. In 1999, he decided to move to Go Ahead Eagles. There, he made his professional debut in professional on 11 November 1999 in the home game against Dordrecht '90 in a 4–4 draw. He soon grew into a key player at the club.

=== NEC ===
In 2000 he signed a four-year contract with NEC. He had a promising start, but in September 2001, however, he tore a cruciate ligament in his knee in a match for the Netherlands under-21 team against England. Ultimately, he would struggle with this injury for two years, until he had a final surgery on his knee on 3 December 2003.

=== NAC Breda ===
In February 2004, Zonneveld signed a four-year contract with NAC Breda. He struggled to break into the starting lineup during the first months of his stint, but then managed to become a starter from the onset of the 2004–05 season. In the second half of the season, he was once again sidelined for a considerable amount of time, partly due to using the banned substance salbutamol in relation to his asthma. The 2005–06 season was also lost for the left midfielder. Once again he struggled with a serious injury, which meant he only made four appearances and scored one goal. Zonneveld was able to return to form in the 2006–07 season. Fully recovered from his injury, he managed to return to the starting lineup of NAC. With his refined technique and efficient free kicks, he became an important player for the team, making 31 league appearances in which he scored six times.

=== PSV ===
On 23 May 2007, after having played 55 games and scored 11 goals for NAC, Zonneveld signed a four-year contract with PSV for the 2007–08 season. Zonneveld scored twice for PSV, against Heracles Almelo and Sparta Rotterdam. In his first season at PSV, Zonneveld immediately won the national championship, yet he lost his starting place in his second season and was allowed to leave the club afterwards. Before the start of the 2009–10 season, he was sent on loan to Groningen.

=== AEL Limassol ===
Ahead of the 2010–11 season, it became clear that Zonneveld again could count on little playing time with PSV. For this reason, he signed a two-year contract with the Cypriot AEL Limassol on 9 July 2010. After one season he was sidelined alongside fellow Dutchman Nicky Hofs at the club. In June 2011, Hofs stated that he and Zonneveld had not received their salary for four months, and that he would file a lawsuit with FIFA. This case ended in February 2014, where Hofs and Zonneveld reached a settlement with the club for a "considerable sum", after having taken the case to the Court of Arbitration for Sport (CAS).

=== Return to NAC ===
On 7 June 2011, Zonneveld returned to NAC Breda after his period in Cyprus, where he signed a contract for two years. At NAC, Zonneveld was mostly sidelined due to recurring injuries, and announced his retirement in January 2013. He remained with the club in a different role until the summer of 2013.

From the summer of 2014, Zonneveld became an assistant coach at VV Noordwijk.

== Honours ==
PSV

- Eredivisie: 2007–08
- Johan Cruyff Shield: 2008
