= Jonathan Reis =

Brazilian footballer

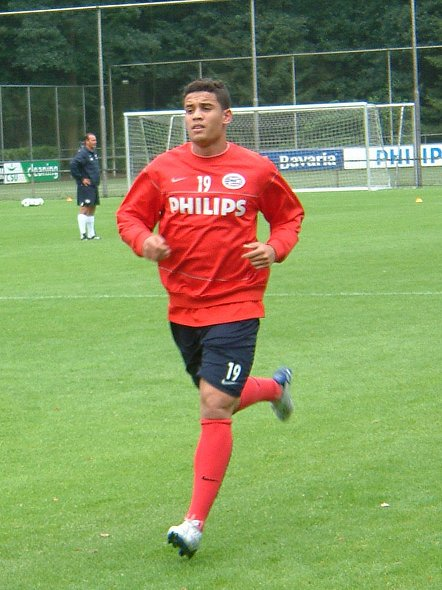
- Jonathan Reis training during his time at PSV in 2008.

Personal information
- Full name: Jonathan Jackson de Lima Reis
- Date of birth: 6 June 1989 (age 37)
- Place of birth: Contagem, Brazil
- Height: 1.83 m (6 ft 0 in)
- Position: Forward

Youth career
- 2005–2007: Atlético Mineiro
- 2007–2010: PSV

Senior career*
Years	Team	Apps	(Gls)
2007–2011	PSV	26	(11)
2009	→ Tupi (loan)	22	(1)
2011–2014	Vitesse	38	(7)
2014	Tombense		
2015	Castelo		
2016–2018	Hokkaido Consadole Sapporo	43	(13)
2018	Albirex Niigata	0	(0)
- * Club domestic league appearances and goals

Jonathan Jackson de Lima Reis (born 6 June 1989) is a Brazilian former professional footballer who played as a forward.

== Club career ==
=== PSV ===
Born in Contagem, Minas Gerais, Brazil, Reis started out at Atlético Mineiro's Academy. In October 2006, he went on trial at Eredivisie side PSV Eindhoven and Ajax. After the trial, it was announced two months later that PSV Eindhoven signed Reis on a five–year contract. However, the move will not take effect until July 2007, as he wasn't eighteen at the time of signing for the club. It was also revealed that the club did not pay the transfer fee to sign Reis.

==== 2007–08 season ====
Ahead of the 2007–08 season, Reis was given a number nineteen shirt. He was mentioned by Manager Ronald Koeman about using him in the first team in the 2007–08 season before leaving in October 2007. Reis officially made his PSV Eindhoven debut in the Johan Cruyff Shield against Ajax on 11 August 2007, where he started the match before coming off in the 73rd minute for Género Zeefuik, in a 1–0 loss. Eight days later on 19 August 2007, Reis set up a goal for Ibrahim Afellay, in a 2–0 win over Heracles Almelo. He then made his UEFA Champions League debut on 12 December 2007, coming on as a late substitute, in a 1–0 loss against Inter Milan. However, he spent the rest of the sidelined, due to lack of first team opportunities.

==== 2008–09 season ====
Ahead of the 2008–09 season, Reis suffered a foot injury, causing him to miss PSV Eindhoven's pre-season tour. However, PSV coach Huub Stevens, furious over this 'unprofessional attitude', relegated him to the reserve squad. Stevens was also dismayed by the bad influence of Reis' agent Vlado Lemić. After receiving more disciplinary action for returning too late from a stay in Brazil where he attended his grandmother's funeral, his career at PSV looked over. Fellow Dutch league teams Roda JC and FC Utrecht as well as Portuguese side Vitóia Setúbal showed interest, but Reis stayed at PSV. However, in January 2009 Reis returned to Brazil by joining Tupi for the rest of the season.

==== 2009–10 season ====
In the 2009–10 season, Reis was given a first team chance following a new management of trainer Fred Rutten after he made some impressive pre-season performance. Reis made his first appearance of the 2009–10 season came on 27 August 2009, where he came on as a late substitute, in a 1–0 win over Bnei Yehuda Tel Aviv; winning 2–0 on aggregate to send them through to the group stage. On 12 September 2009, he made his first league appearance in over a year, coming on as a late substitute, in a 3–0 win over Roda JC. On 17 September 2009, in the Europa league group K match at Sparta Prague, Reis came on as substitute in the 64th minute and scored twice, in a 2–1 win, salvaging a point and becoming an unlikely hero. Then on 23 September 2009, Reis plays his first full match for PSV in the 2–1 Dutch Cup win against first division side De Graafschap. He added three goals throughout October, scoring against Copenhagen, N.E.C. and Roda JC. He added three more goals between 27 November 2009 and 6 December 2009, scoring twice in the league and once in the UEFA Europa League. Since returning to the first team, Reis established himself in the starting eleven at the striker position. On 24 January 2010, however, his contract was terminated after he tested positive for a banned substance and subsequently refused the club's offer of help to treat drug addiction. It was reported that in the case of Reis signing for another club, PSV would file a lawsuit against the player to try to get back some of the money the club had invested in him. Up until his release, Reis made twenty appearances and scoring eight times in all competitions.

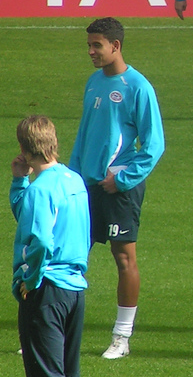
Reis warming up for the side.

Since his release by PSV Eindhoven, Reis spent time at rehab in Brazil for several months. Over the summer, the club were determined to re–sign him. Eventually, on 17 July 2010, Reis re–signed for PSV Eindhoven for the second time, signing a one–year contract, with an option of extending the contract into a three-year deal.

==== 2010–11 season ====
In the 2010–11 season, Reis' first month return saw him out of the first team, as he was not selected in the starting eleven. Instead, he spent his first month return with the club's reserve. The following month, on 16 September 2010, Reis played his first match since re–joining the club, in a UEFA Europa League match against Sampdoria, coming on as a late substitute, in a 1–1 draw. After losing his place over driving under the influence of alcohol, he returned to the first team on 3 October 2010 against VVV-Venlo, scoring twice, in a 3–0 win. This was followed up by scoring against Willem II, Debreceni (scoring once in two separate matches) and Vitesse. Reis also netted a hat-trick against Feyenoord (his first in his professional career) in a 10–0 victory on 24 October 2010. His goal scoring form led suggestion from Piet de Visser that he could earn a place for the FIFA World Cup in Brazil (Reis' nationality) if only he continues to be clean. Due to his goalscoring forms, many people in Eindhoven thought the natural heir to Romário and Ronaldo's momentous heritage had finally arrived. However, in a 2–1 win over FC Utrecht on 7 November 2010, Reis was sent–off mid-way through the first half after elbowing Alje Schut. As a result, he served a two match suspension. Things got bad to worse for Reis when he suffered a serious knee injury during a 3–1 win over Roda JC on 19 December 2010. It was announced that Reis would be out for the rest of the season and never played again. In response to the news, Reis received about 1400 messages from PSV supporters for positive support. Up until his knee injury, he went on to make fifteen appearances and scoring ten times in all competitions. He spent the rest of the season, rehabilitating and having operation on his knee injury.

Throughout the 2010–11 season, his contract with PSV ran out despite PSV planning to offer Reis a one-year extension to his expiring deal, but was plagued due to fitness problems, as well as, speculations on whether or not, the contract is being offered on the table yet. However, Reis did not want to settle for anything less than a long-term contract and therefore decided to leave. Following his release from PSV, manager Fred Rutten stated Reis was making good progress in his recovery from a serious knee injury and expected his return to PSV in October. Reis was quoted as being hopeful of returning to PSV Eindhoven on a new deal but the club were not convinced that Reis would fully recover from his knee injury, and opted against offering him a new deal when it was made clear that he wanted to move on.

Reis later reflected about his time at PSV Eindhoven and said: "The lifestyle I had at PSV was due to immature behaviour. I was young, alone in the Netherlands and wasn't responsible at that time. I'm not trying to justify using alcohol at that age, but the chance for things to go awry was made possible by the circumstances."

=== Vitesse ===
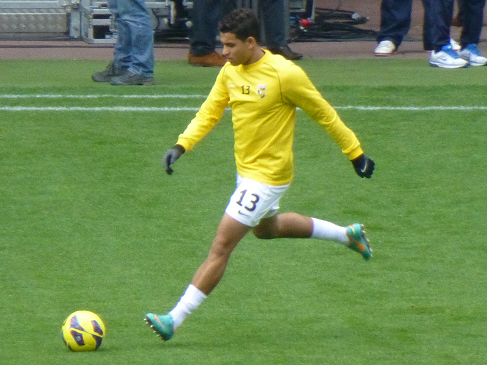
Reis training for Vitesse before the match against Twente at the GelreDome stadium in 2012.

On 4 December 2011, Reis signed a contract until the end of the 2011–12 season with Vitesse, including an option to extend to extend. His move came after the club had been in the market for attacking reinforcements with Wilfried Bony being away on international duty with Côte d'Ivoire during the Africa Cup of Nations.

However, he spent the rest of December, continuously having surgery. Then, on 22 January 2012, Reis made his first start on his debut for Vitesse before being substituted in the 66th minute for Mart Lieder against N.E.C. in a 1–0 loss. Five days later, on 27 January 2012, Reis was on the bench until coming on for Marcus Pedersen in the 66th minute facing his former club PSV in a 3–1 loss. During the match, he was welcomed back in Eindhoven with bags of powdered sugar being thrown onto the pitch in reference to his struggle with cocaine during his years at PSV. He spent the rest of the season in and out of the first team, either on the sideline and on the substitute bench. By April, Reis began to receive a handful of first team football for the side, as he helped Vitesse secure a UEFA Europa League place next season. At the end of the 2011–12 season, he went on to make thirteen appearances for the side in all competitions. On 27 June 2012, Reis signed a new deal with Vitesse, keeping him until 2016.

In the 2012–13 season, Reis started the season well when he scored the club's fourth goal of the game, in a 4–4 draw against Lokomotiv Plovdiv in the first leg of the UEFA Europa League Second round. In the second leg, SBV Vitesse ultimately went through to the next round after beating them 3–1. He then scored three goals the following month, including a brace against Willem II. His goal from a free kick against ADO Den Haag earned him August's Goal of the Month by the club's supporters. As a result, he became a first team regular for the side. Reis scored three goals in two matches between 25 November 2012 and 2 December 2012, scoring against his former club, PSV Eindhoven, and a brace against Roda JC. Towards the end of the 2012–13 season, Reis soon suffered a goal drought, as well as, fighting for his first team place. During a 2–0 loss against Feyenoord on 21 April 2013, Reis was shown ignoring his teammate, Valeri Qazaishvili when he was substituted, and was criticised by Manager Rutten after the match. At the end of the 2012–13 season, Reis went on to make thirty–six appearances and scoring ten times in all competitions.

Ahead of the 2013–14 season, Reis was given a number 9 shirt following the departure of Bony, who departed to Premier League side Swansea City. He, again, started the 2013–14 season well when he scored his first goal of the season, in a 1–1 draw against Petrolul Ploiești in the first leg of the UEFA Europa League Third Round. Then, on 1 September 2013, Reis scored his first league goal for the club, in a 1–1 draw against AZ Alkmaar. However, he was sent to the reserve side by Manager Peter Bosz and explained his actions, saying: "I felt that was necessary, and that has everything to do with the team: if a player places himself outside, I have to intervene, that's what I did, so that's why I temporarily put him back to the promises." The decision also contributed the pair fallen out. Up until then, Reis made five appearances and scoring two times this season so far.

After spending two months away from the first team, Vitesse dissolved his contract in November 2013 despite having three more years left to his contract. Another factor of his departure was over his family unable to adapt in the country.

=== Return to Brazil ===
Reis returned to his home country Brazil and joined Esporte Clube Bahia, only to have his contract with the club terminated ten days later. He joined Tombense and then Castelo, both of them were short–lived. He briefly joined Mamoré at the end of 2014.

At the beginning of 2015, Reis went on trial with Kazakhstan Premier League side Irtysh Pavlodar and Tunisian Ligue Professionnelle 1 side Espérance Sportive de Tunis, both of them were unsuccessful.

=== Boluspor ===
On 29 July 2015, it was announced that Reis joined TFF First League side Boluspor. However, he never made an appearance for the side, as his time at Boluspor was overshadowed with transfer problem and weight problem.

On 31 December 2015, it was announced that Reis was released by the club, along with eight players. He revealed that the factor of his departure was the "low wages" and was angry with the club.

=== Hokkaido Consadole Sapporo ===
Shortly leaving Boluspor, Reis moved to Japan, where he joined J2 League side Hokkaido Consadole Sapporo. He later revealed that the club's director of football, Hirokatsu Mikami, convinced him to join the club. He also goes under the name for the club, "Heise", and was given a number eleven shirt.

Reis made his Hokkaido Consadole Sapporo debut on 6 March 2016, where he came on as a substitute, in a 4–0 win over FC Gifu. Since joining the club, Reis struggled a goal drought at the start of his Hokkaido Consadole Sapporo's career. On 4 June 2016, he scored his first goal for the club, having come on as a substitute in a 2–2 draw against JEF United Chiba. Between 13 June 2016 and 3 July 2016, Reis scored three goals in the club's four victories. However, he suffered injuries on two occasions between July and August. Reis later scored two more goals before being sidelined once again. He made his return from injury on 12 November 2016, coming on as a substitute, in a 2–1 win over JEF United Chiba. At the end of the 2016 season, which saw the club get promoted to J.League 1, Reis went on to make twenty–four appearances and scoring seven times in all competitions. At the end of the 2017 season, Reis described the promotion to J.League 1 as the "best moments of his career".

In the 2017 season, however, Reis suffered a knee injury that saw him sidelined for two months. On 21 June 2017, he made his first team return from injury against Iwaki in the second round of the Emperor Cup and scored twice, as Hokkaido Consadole Sapporo lost 5–2. This was followed up by scoring two goal against Kashiwa Reysol and Shimizu S-Pulse. Reis then scored four more goals, including playing a role in the club's two victories against Vegalta Sendai and Júbilo Iwata. However, he was sidelined for the rest of the season, due to injuries. At the end of the 2017 season, Reis went on to make fourteen appearances and scoring eight times in all competitions. On 5 December 2017, he signed a contract with the club.

In the 2018 season, Reis found his first team opportunities limited, as he was featured on the substitute bench in the number of matches. He scored his first goal of the season, in a 2–1 loss against Shimizu S-Pulse in the J.League Cup Group Stage on 4 April 2018. Having made ten appearances and scoring once for the club this season, it was announced on 30 August 2018 that Reis was released by the club after spending two years.

=== Albirex Niigata ===
Shortly after leaving Hokkaido Consadole Sapporo, Reis joined another J.League 1 side Albirex Niigata on 11 September 2018.

However, he made no appearances for Albirex Niigata, due to suffering from a heel injury. At the end of the 2018 season, Reis was released by the club.

=== Retirement ===
In March 2019, Reis announced his retirement from football after a move to Indonesia failed to materialise. He cited his knee injury suffered in PSV as the reason for his career's deroute. After his retirement, he started working as a youth coach at Brazilian club Brumadinho FC.

== Career statistics ==
Updated to 23 February 2018.

Appearances and goals by club, season and competition
Club	Season	League			Emperor's Cup		J.League Cup		Total	
Club	Season	Division	Apps	Goals	Apps	Goals	Apps	Goals	Apps	Goals
Hokkaido Consadole Sapporo	2016	J2 League	24	7	0	0	—		24	7
Hokkaido Consadole Sapporo	2017	J1 League	12	6	1	2	1	0	14	8
Career total			36	13	1	2	1	0	38	15

== Personal life ==
On 19 September 2010, Reis was arrested by police after being caught driving under the influence of alcohol. Although the club denied reports that they would terminate his contract, he was instead fined and lost his place as a result. Following the incident, Reis expressed regret for his actions and vowed to repay the club. Two years later, he was summoned to court by the judge on 13 November 2012 to face charges. Ultimately, on his summoned to court, charges against him were dropped, at the request from his lawyer.

Reis is married to his wife Thais and together, they have a son, Caique. He then became a father for a second when his son Ruka was born on 12 July 2018. In addition to speaking Portuguese, Reis is fluent in Dutch and currently taking Japanese lessons to speak the language.

Following his Vitesse's career ended, Reis revealed that when he returned to Brazil, saying: " went back to Brazil, but my mentality was still very bad. I was not busy with my family or career as a professional footballer. I only thought about myself, about Jonah. I was selfish and went all out, into the nightlife of Belo Horizonte. My money went up so quickly. I did it all too easily and could no longer take good care of my family. Fortunately, my wife always kept talking to me to play football again at a professional club. On New Year's Eve of 2015, I decided to change course. I said to my wife, "I stop with alcohol and going out. I'm going to change my life. "She was happy with that, but of course she wanted to see it happen. After a year without disco life, I was a professional football player again."
