= Martijn Thomassen =

Dutch footballer (born 1990)

Personal information
- Full name: Martijn Thomassen
- Date of birth: 6 June 1990 (age 36)
- Place of birth: Geldrop, Netherlands
- Height: 1.75 m (5 ft 9 in)
- Position: Left back

Youth career
- EMK
- PSV
- Vitesse/AGOVV

Senior career*
Years	Team	Apps	(Gls)
2011–2012	AGOVV Apeldoorn	13	(0)
2012–2013	FC Eindhoven	1	(0)
- * Club domestic league appearances and goals as of 3 August 2013 (UTC)

Martijn Thomassen (born 6 June 1990 in Geldrop) is a Dutch professional footballer who plays as a defender. He formerly played for AGOVV Apeldoorn and FC Eindhoven. He is currently without a club.
