= Dirk Marcellis =

Dutch footballer (born 1988)

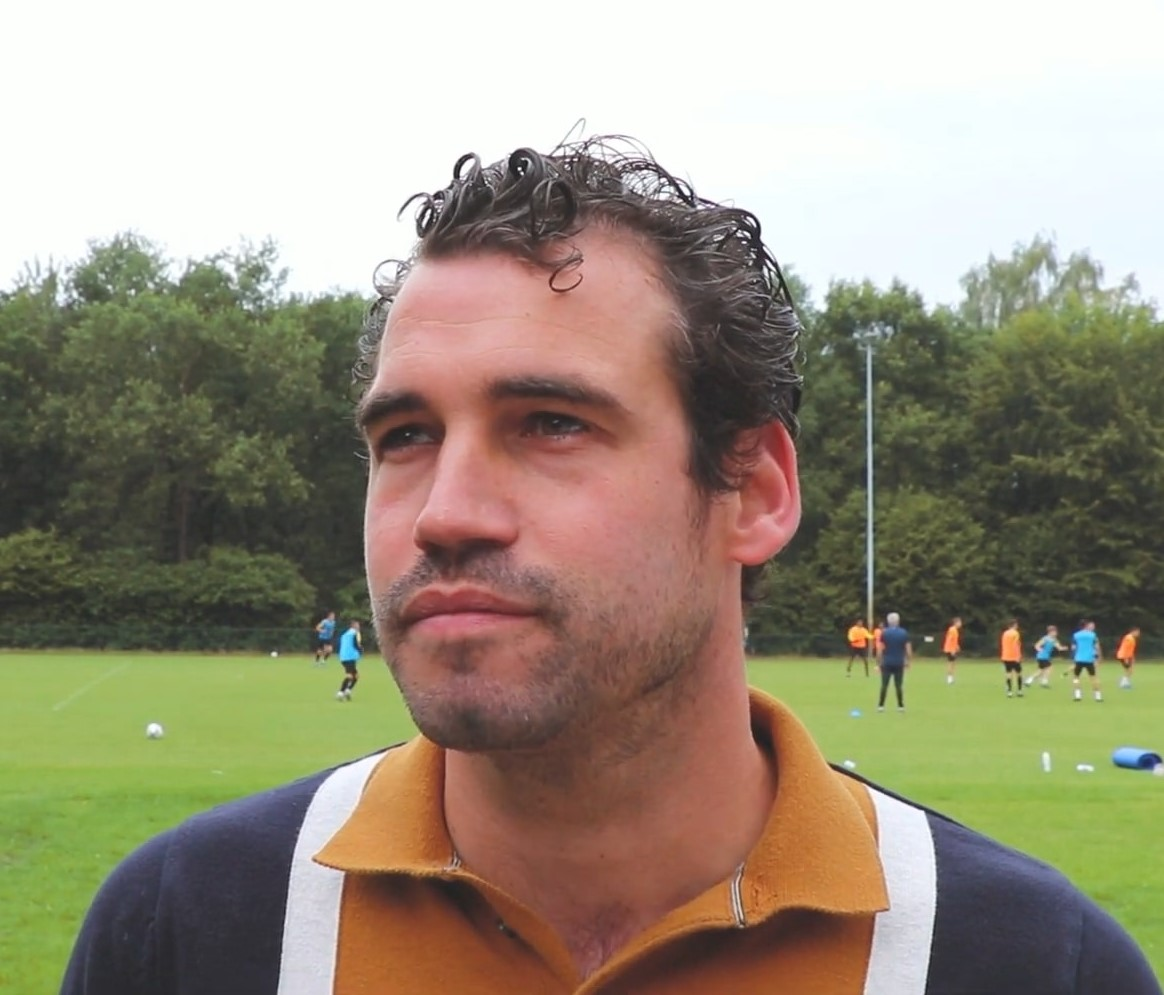
- Marcellis in 2020

Personal information
- Full name: Dirk Antoon Nico Marcellis
- Date of birth: 13 April 1988 (age 38)
- Place of birth: Horst, Netherlands
- Height: 1.81 m (5 ft 11 in)
- Position: Centre back

Youth career
- Wittenhorst
- VVV-Venlo

Senior career*
| Years | Team | Apps | (Gls) |
| 2006–2010 | PSV Eindhoven | 68 | (0) |
| 2010–2015 | AZ Alkmaar | 88 | (0) |
| 2015 | NAC Breda | 17 | (0) |
| 2015–2018 | PEC Zwolle | 88 | (5) |
| Total | | 261 | (5) |

International career
| 2005 | Netherlands U17 | 3 | (1) |
| 2008–2009 | Netherlands U21 | 4 | (0) |
| 2008–2010 | Netherlands | 3 | (0) |
Medal record
Men's football
Representing Netherlands
UEFA European Under-17 Championship
| Runner-up | 2005 |
- * Club domestic league appearances and goals

Dirk Antoon Nico Marcellis (born 13 April 1988) is a Dutch former professional footballer who played as a centre back. After a non-playing period at PSV Eindhoven, Marcellis fought back at AZ Alkmaar and became one of its important players. After suffering from injuries, he signed with NAC Breda in January 2015. He signed with PEC Zwolle after NAC was relegated. He retired in 2018 due to a severe knee injury.

== Club career ==
=== PSV Eindhoven ===
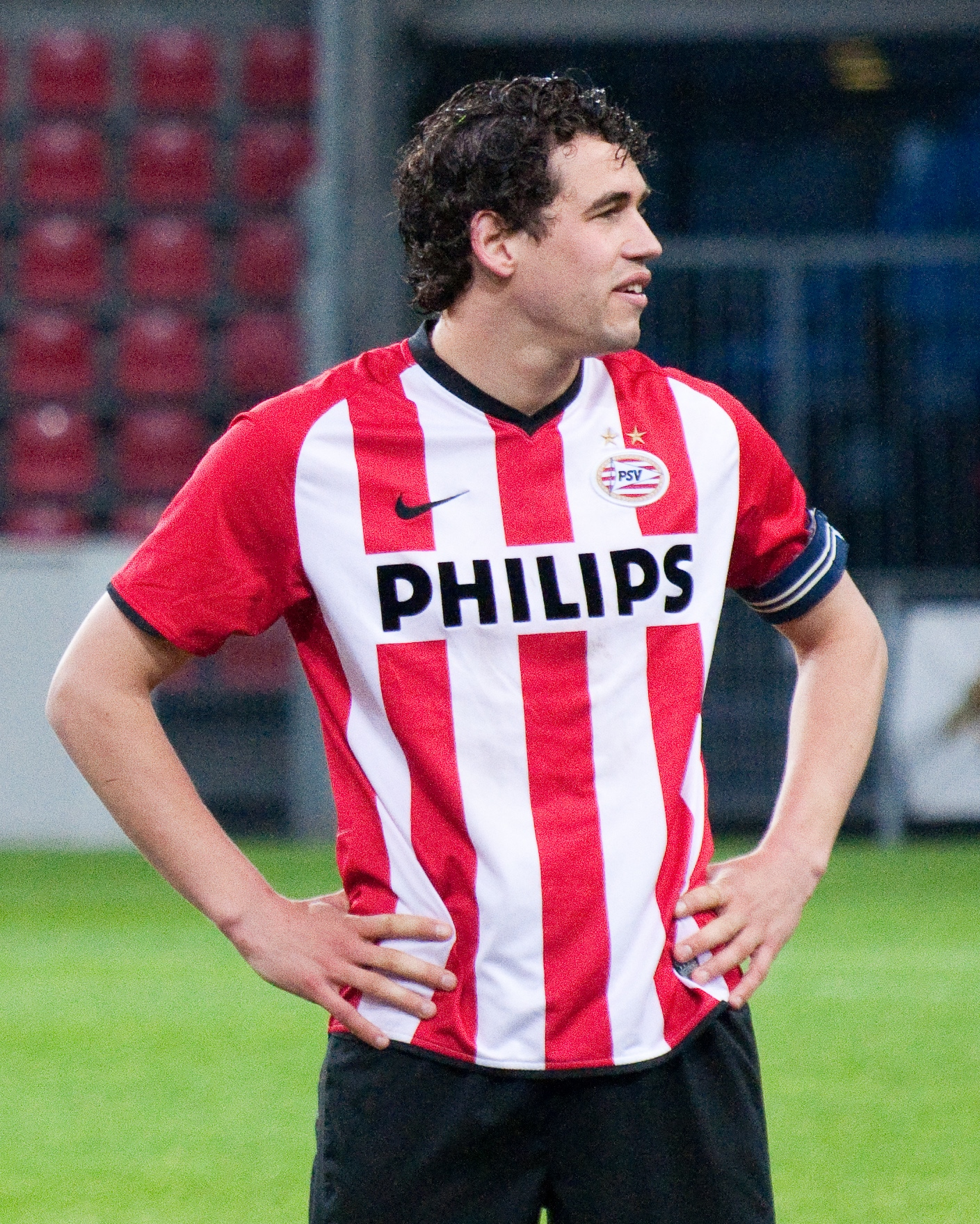
Marcellis with PSV Eindhoven in 2010

Born in Horst aan de Maas, Marcellis began his professional career at PSV Eindhoven. Despite being short for a central defender, Marcellis worked his way up the ladder at the club, and eventually played his way in the starting line-up, forming a confident pair with Mexican defender Carlos Salcido. It was then that Marcellis was first really noticed by the bigger audience. He managed himself quite comfortably in the PSV defence, and almost effortlessly replaced the highly rated Brazilian central defender Alex, who went back to Chelsea after being loaned by PSV for several seasons. On 30 July 2009, Marcellis scored a last-minute goal against Bulgarian side Cherno More Varna to help his team to a 1–0 home win in a third qualifying round game of the UEFA Europa League. He transferred to AZ Alkmaar after they sold their striker Jeremain Lens to PSV.

=== AZ Alkmaar ===
On 21 May 2010, Marcellis was involved with the deal with Jeremain Lens. Lens went to PSV and AZ contracted Marcellis. After a non-playing period at PSV, Marcellis fought back at AZ and became one of the more reliable defenders in the league. He injured his knee in May 2013 and as a result he missed the whole 2013–14 season. After his contract expired in July 2014, he was released. However, in October 2014, he was given an opportunity to earn a new contract with the Alkmaar side by signing an amateur deal. He returned as a substitute in the match against Feyenoord on 14 December 2014.

=== NAC Breda ===
On 31 December 2014, it was announced that Marcellis had signed with Eredivisie side NAC Breda until the end of the season. Upon arrival he was named captain by trainer Robert Maaskant.

== International career ==
=== Youth ===
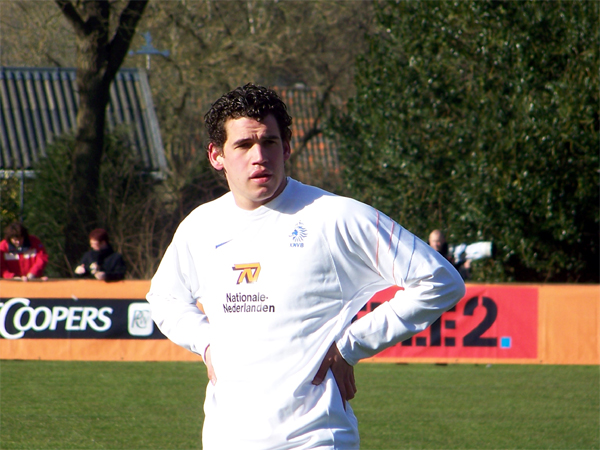
Marcellis during a Jong Oranje training in March 2008

After impressing with PSV both in the UEFA Cup against Tottenham Hotspur and Fiorentina, where he played solid games against Dimitar Berbatov and Adrian Mutu, Marcellis caught the eye of not only Dutch football fans but also the Netherlands U-21 coach Foppe de Haan.

De Haan almost immediately included Marcellis in the squad and let him make his debut for the Netherlands U-21. Marcellis didn't disappoint by playing very solidly in defence, game after game. Not only on his preferred place in central defence but at times also as a right back.

=== 2008 Beijing Summer Olympics ===
He was selected for the Netherlands Olympic squad and was absolute first choice central defender during the entire run-up to the Olympics, where he made a confident impression, seldom making a mistake. He played in all the group games, where the Dutch barely qualified for the quarter finals, coming second on points. He also played the quarter-final against Argentina, where they were eliminated. After the full 90 minutes and extra time had resulted in a 1–1 draw, they surprisingly lost 2–1.

=== Senior ===
He received his first call-up under national team coach Bert van Marwijk for the 2010 FIFA World Cup qualification matches against Norway & Iceland. He made his debut on 11 October 2008, against Iceland.

== Career statistics ==
Appearances and goals by club, season and competition
| Club | Season | League | | | KNVB Cup | | Europe | | Other | | Total | |
| Club | Season | Division | Apps | Goals | Apps | Goals | Apps | Goals | Apps | Goals | Apps | Goals |
|---|---|---|---|---|---|---|---|---|---|---|---|---|
| PSV Eindhoven | 2006–07 | Eredivisie | 0 | 0 | 0 | 0 | 1 | 0 | – | | 1 | 0 |
| PSV Eindhoven | 2007–08 | Eredivisie | 26 | 0 | 1 | 0 | 10 | 0 | – | | 37 | 0 |
| PSV Eindhoven | 2008–09 | Eredivisie | 31 | 0 | 1 | 0 | 5 | 0 | 1 (Note: Appearance in Dutch Super Cup) | 1 | 38 | 1 |
| PSV Eindhoven | 2009–10 | Eredivisie | 11 | 0 | 2 | 0 | 3 | 1 | – | | 17 | 1 |
| PSV Eindhoven | Total | | 68 | 0 | 4 | 0 | 19 | 1 | 1 | 1 | 92 | 2 |
| AZ Alkmaar | 2010–11 | Eredivisie | 32 | 0 | 3 | 0 | 9 | 0 | – | | 44 | 0 |
| AZ Alkmaar | 2011–12 | Eredivisie | 24 | 0 | 4 | 0 | 13 | 0 | – | | 41 | 0 |
| AZ Alkmaar | 2012–13 | Eredivisie | 31 | 0 | 6 | 1 | 2 | 0 | – | | 39 | 0 |
| AZ Alkmaar | 2013–14 | Eredivisie | 0 | 0 | 0 | 0 | 0 | 0 | – | | 0 | 0 |
| AZ Alkmaar | 2014–15 | Eredivisie | 1 | 0 | 0 | 0 | 0 | 0 | – | | 1 | 0 |
| AZ Alkmaar | Total | | 88 | 0 | 13 | 1 | 24 | 0 | 0 | 0 | 125 | 1 |
| NAC Breda | 2014–15 | Eredivisie | 17 | 0 | 0 | 0 | 0 | 0 | 4 (Note: Appearanes in Eredivisie relegation play-offs) | 0 | 21 | 0 |
| PEC Zwolle | 2015–16 | Eredivisie | 29 | 4 | 1 | 0 | – | | 2 (Note: Appearanes in Eredivisie UEFA Europa League play-offs) | 0 | 1 | 0 |
| PEC Zwolle | 2016–17 | Eredivisie | 29 | 0 | 2 | 0 | – | | – | | 44 | 0 |
| PEC Zwolle | 2017–18 | Eredivisie | 28 | 1 | 4 | 0 | – | | – | | 41 | 0 |
| PEC Zwolle | 2018–19 | Eredivisie | 2 | 0 | 0 | 0 | – | | – | | 39 | 0 |
| PEC Zwolle | Total | | 88 | 5 | 7 | 0 | 0 | 0 | 2 | 0 | 97 | 5 |
| Career total | | | 261 | 5 | 24 | 1 | 43 | 1 | 7 | 1 | 335 | 8 |

== Honours ==
PSV

- Eredivisie: 2007–08
- Johan Cruijff Shield: 2008

AZ

- KNVB Cup: 2012–13
