= Stijn Wuytens =

Belgian footballer

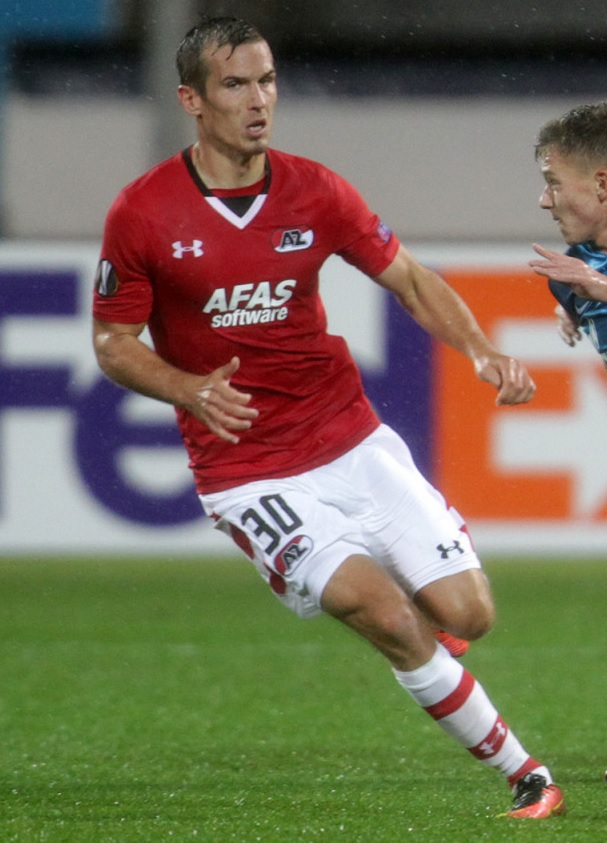
- Wuytens with AZ in 2016

Personal information
- Date of birth: 8 October 1989 (age 37)
- Place of birth: Eksel, Belgium
- Height: 1.83 m (6 ft 0 in)
- Position: Centre-back

Youth career
- –2001: Genk
- 2001–2008: PSV

Senior career*
Years	Team	Apps	(Gls)
2008–2012	PSV	27	(1)
2009	→ De Graafschap (loan)	13	(0)
2012–2013	Beerschot	12	(2)
2013–2016	Willem II	62	(4)
2016–2020	AZ	106	(1)
2020–2025	Lommel	61	(2)

International career
2008–2009	Belgium U19	6	(1)
2008–2009	Belgium U21	5	(0)
- * Club domestic league appearances and goals

Stijn Wuytens (Dutch pronunciation: [stɛiɱ ˈʋœytəns]; born 8 October 1989) is a Belgian former professional footballer who played as a centre-back.

== Club career ==
Wuytens began his career at Genk, before being transferred to the PSV Eindhoven-youth division in 2001. Wuytens made his senior debut for PSV in the 2008 Johan Cruyff Shield match against Feyenoord Rotterdam. On 2 February 2009, he was loaned out to De Graafschap until the end of the season, before returning to PSV. On 12 June 2012, it was announced that he would switch to the Belgian team Beerschot for the next season.

=== AZ ===
In the winter break of the 2015–16 season, Wuytens transferred to AZ Alkmaar. Here he was set up as a central defender by trainer John van den Brom, with Ron Vlaar at his side. The following season, Wuytens made his first goal for AZ, in an away match against FK Vojvodina in the Europa League. Wuytens also made his second goal in the Europa League for AZ on 15 September 2016. This time, he scored in a home game against the Irish Dundalk FC. While scoring, he came into direct contact with Dundalk goalkeeper Gary Rogers. It turned out that Wuytens was unconscious for a moment, swallowed his tongue and suffered a concussion.

=== Lommel ===
In June 2020 Wuytens moved to Belgian side Lommel, an ambitious club that City Football Group bought in May 2020. He signed a contract with Lommel, keeping him there until June 2025.

== Personal life ==
Stijn Wuytens is the brother of Dries Wuytens who plays professionally for Waasland-Beveren in Belgium, and cousin of ex-AZ player Jan Wuytens

== Career statistics ==
As of match played 19 January 2018

Appearances and goals by club, season and competition
Club	Season	League			National Cup		Europe		Other		Total	
Club	Season	Division	Apps	Goals	Apps	Goals	Apps	Goals	Apps	Goals	Apps	Goals
PSV	2008–09	Eredivisie	11	1	0	0	3 (Note: Appearances in the Champions League)	0	1 (Note: Appearance in the Johan Cruyff Shield)	0	15	1
PSV	2009–10	Eredivisie	6	0	1	0	1 (Note: Appearances in the Europa League)	0	0	0	8	0
PSV	2010–11	Eredivisie	8	0	3	0	6	0	0	0	17	0
PSV	2011–12	Eredivisie	2	0	1	0	0	0	0	0	3	0
PSV	Total		27	1	4	0	10	0	1	0	42	1
De Graafschap (loan)	2008–09	Eredivisie	15	0	1	0	~	~	4 (Note: Appearances in the Eredivisie relegation play-offs)	2	20	2
Beerschot	2012–13	Pro League	16	2	0	0	~	~	0	0	16	2
Willem II	2013–14	Eredivisie	10	1	0	0	~	~	0	0	10	1
Willem II	2014–15	Eredivisie	34	2	0	0	~	~	0	0	34	2
Willem II	2015–16	Eredivisie	18	1	3	0	~	~	0	0	21	1
Willem II	Total		62	4	3	0	0	0	0	0	65	4
AZ	2015–16	Eredivisie	15	0	2	0	~	~	0	0	17	0
AZ	2016–17	Eredivisie	33	1	4	0	12	3	0	0	49	4
AZ	2017–18	Eredivisie	18	0	3	1	0	0	0	0	21	1
AZ	Total		66	1	9	1	12	3	0	0	87	5
Career total			186	8	17	1	22	3	5	2	230	14

== Honours ==
=== Club ===
PSV

- Johan Cruijff Shield: 2008

Willem II

- Eerste Divisie: 2013–14
