= 2004–05 PSV Eindhoven season =

PSV Eindhoven
2004–05 season
- Head coach: Guus Hiddink
- Stadium: Philips Stadion
- Eredivisie: 1st
- KNVB Cup: Winners
- Champions League: Semi-finals
- Top goalscorer: League: Jan Vennegoor of Hesselink (19); All: Jan Vennegoor of Hesselink (22)
Home colours	Away colours

During the 2004–05 Dutch football season, PSV Eindhoven competed in the Eredivisie.

== Season summary ==
Despite losing several key players in the summer, PSV reached the semi-finals of the Champions League before being knocked out by eventual runners-up Milan. PSV won the home leg 3–1, but lost 2–0 at the San Siro, Milan advancing on away goals.

== Players ==
=== First-team squad ===
Squad at end of season

Note: Flags indicate national team as defined under FIFA eligibility rules; some limited exceptions apply. Players may hold more than one non-FIFA nationality.

No.	Pos.	Nation	Player
1	GK	BRA	Heurelho Gomes
2	DF	NED	André Ooijer
3	DF	KOR	Lee Young-pyo
4	DF	BRA	Alex
5	DF	NED	Wilfred Bouma
6	MF	NED	Mark van Bommel
7	MF	KOR	Park Ji-sung
8	MF	NED	Phillip Cocu
9	FW	NED	Jan Vennegoor of Hesselink
10	MF	BRA	Leandro Bonfim
11	MF	USA	DaMarcus Beasley
13	MF	NED	Remco van der Schaaf
14	MF	SUI	Johann Vogel
15	FW	SUI	Johan Vonlanthen

No.	Pos.	Nation	Player
16	DF	NED	Theo Lucius
17	FW	PER	Jefferson Farfán
18	DF	GHA	Eric Addo
19	DF	NED	Michael Lamey
21	GK	NED	Edwin Zoetebier
22	MF	HUN	Csaba Fehér
23	GK	AUS	Nathan Coe
25	MF	NED	John de Jong
28	MF	NED	Jordi Hoogstrate
29	FW	BRA	Robert
30	DF	DEN	Kasper Bøgelund
32	MF	NED	Ibrahim Afellay
35	FW	NED	Gerald Sibon
—	MF	BRA	Leandro

=== Left club during season ===
Note: Flags indicate national team as defined under FIFA eligibility rules; some limited exceptions apply. Players may hold more than one non-FIFA nationality.

No.	Pos.	Nation	Player
20	DF	NED	Jürgen Colin (to NAC Breda)
24	FW	MAR	Adil Ramzi (to AZ)
26	MF	NED	Jasar Takak (on loan to RKC Waalwijk)
27	MF	NED	Arvid Smit (on loan to Willem II)

No.	Pos.	Nation	Player
29	DF	DEN	Michael Jakobsen (to Aalborg BK)
31	FW	NED	Otman Bakkal (on loan to Den Bosch)
—	GK	NED	Jelle ten Rouwelaar (on loan to PEC Zwolle)
—	DF	AUS	Lindsay Wilson (on loan to Helmond Sport)

=== Starting 11 ===
Considering starts in all competitions

No.	Pos.	Nat.	Name	MS	Notes
1	GK	(Brazil)	Heurelho Gomes	44	
2	RB	(Netherlands)	André Ooijer	32	
4	CB	(Brazil)	Alex	33	
5	CB	(Netherlands)	Wilfred Bouma	39	
3	LB	(South Korea)	Lee Young-pyo	45	
6	CM	(Netherlands)	Mark van Bommel	44	
8	CM	(Netherlands)	Phillip Cocu	40	
14	CM	(Switzerland)	Johann Vogel	37	
7	RW	(South Korea)	Park Ji-sung	39	
9	CF	(Netherlands)	Jan Vennegoor of Hesselink	36	
17	LW	(Peru)	Jefferson Farfán	35	

== Transfers ==
=== In ===
- (Brazil) Robert – (Mexico) Atlas – January, £2,000,000

=== Out ===
- (Netherlands) Arjen Robben – (England) Chelsea – €18,000,000 (£12,100,000)
- (Denmark) Dennis Rommedahl – (England) Charlton Athletic
- (Serbia and Montenegro) Mateja Kežman – (England) Chelsea – 13 July, £5,300,000
- (Netherlands) Jurgen Colin – (Netherlands) NAC Breda
- (Morocco) Adil Ramzi – (Netherlands) AZ
- (Netherlands) Jasar Takak – (Netherlands) RKC Waalwijk, loan
- (Netherlands) Arvid Smit – (Netherlands) Willem II, loan
- (Denmark) Michael Jakobsen – (Denmark) Aalborg BK, February
- (Netherlands) Otman Bakkal – (Netherlands) Den Bosch, loan
