= 2005 KNVB Cup final =

- Event: 2004–05 KNVB Cup
| Willem II | PSV |
| 0 | 4 |
- Date: 29 May 2005
- Venue: De Kuip, Rotterdam
- Referee: Eric Braamhaar
- Attendance: 35,000

The 2005 KNVB Cup final was a football match between Willem II and PSV on 29 May 2005 at De Kuip, Rotterdam. It was the final match of the 2004–05 KNVB Cup competition. PSV won 4–0 after goals from Wilfred Bouma, Phillip Cocu, Park Ji-sung and Jan Vennegoor of Hesselink. With this victory, PSV clinched the double, as they had also become champions of the 2004–05 Eredivisie. This was PSV's first double since the 1988–89 season.

== Route to the final ==
| Willem II | | Round | PSV | |
|---|---|---|---|---|
| Opponent | Result | | Opponent | Result |
| SV Meerssen | 5–0 (H) | First round | Bye | |
| Sparta Rotterdam | 2–0 (H) | Second round | Bye | |
| BV Veendam | 5–4 (A) | Third round | Bye | |
| Go Ahead Eagles | 1–0 (A) | Round of 16 | FC Volendam | 4–0 (H) |
| FC Den Bosch | 3–0 (H) | Quarter-finals | TOP Oss | 6–1 (H) |
| Ajax | 1–0 (H) | Semi-finals | Feyenoord | 1–1 (4–2 p) (A) |

== Match ==
=== Details ===
29 May 2005
18:00 CEST

| Willem II | 0–4 | PSV |
|---|---|---|
| | Report | Bouma 45'; Cocu 51'; Park 74'; Vennegoor of Hesselink 90' |

De Kuip, Rotterdam
Attendance: 35,000
Referee: Eric Braamhaar

| Willem II | PSV |

| GK | (Netherlands) Oscar Moens |
| RB | (Netherlands Antilles) Nuelson Wau | (yellow card) 56' |
| CB | (Netherlands) Frank van der Struijk | (yellow card) 61' |
| CB | (Netherlands) Frank van Mosselveld | | (substituted off) 70' |
| LB | (Netherlands) Albert van der Haar |
| CM | (Netherlands) Kemy Agustien | | (substituted off) 85' |
| CM | (Netherlands Antilles) Raymond Victoria (c) | | (substituted off) 46' |
| AM | (Belgium) Tom Caluwé |
| RW | (The Gambia) Jatto Ceesay |
| CF | (Netherlands) Martijn Reuser | (yellow card) 58' |
| LW | (Netherlands) Kevin Bobson |
Substitutes:
| DF | (Netherlands) Michel Kreek | (yellow card) 58' | (substituted on) 46' |
| FW | (Netherlands) Iwan Redan | | (substituted on) 70' |
| MF | (Belgium) Sven Delanoy | | (substituted on) 85' |
Manager:
(Netherlands) Robert Maaskant

| GK | 1 | (Brazil) Gomes |
| RB | 16 | (Netherlands) Theo Lucius |
| CB | 4 | (Brazil) Alex |
| CB | 5 | (Netherlands) Wilfred Bouma | (substituted off) 85' |
| LB | 3 | (South Korea) Lee Young-pyo |
| CM | 6 | (Netherlands) Mark van Bommel (c) |
| CM | 14 | (Switzerland) Johann Vogel |
| CM | 8 | (Netherlands) Phillip Cocu | (substituted off) 70' |
| RW | 17 | (Peru) Jefferson Farfán |
| CF | 9 | (Netherlands) Jan Vennegoor of Hesselink |
| LW | 7 | (South Korea) Park Ji-sung |
Substitutes:
| GK | 21 | (Netherlands) Edwin Zoetebier |
| DF | 2 | (Netherlands) André Ooijer | (substituted on) 85' |
| DF | 18 | (Ghana) Eric Addo |
| DF | 30 | (Denmark) Kasper Bøgelund |
| MF | 13 | (Netherlands) Remco van der Schaaf |
| MF | 32 | (Netherlands) Ibrahim Afellay | (substituted on) 70' |
| FW | 35 | (Netherlands) Gerald Sibon |
Manager:
(Netherlands) Guus Hiddink

Match rules

- 90 minutes.
- 30 minutes of extra-time if necessary.
- Penalty shoot-out if scores still level.
- Maximum of three substitutions.
