= 2003–04 PSV Eindhoven season =

PSV Eindhoven
2003–04 season
- Head coach: Guus Hiddink
- Eredivisie: 2nd
- Johan Cruyff Shield: Winners
- KNVB Cup: Quarter-finals
- UEFA Champions League: Group stage
- UEFA Cup: Quarter-finals
- Top goalscorer: Mateja Kežman (31)
Home colours	Away colours	Third colours

During the 2003–04 Dutch football season, PSV Eindhoven competed in the Eredivisie.

== Season summary ==
Despite the 31 goals of Mateja Kežman, PSV failed to retain their title.

== First-team squad ==
Squad at end of season

Note: Flags indicate national team as defined under FIFA eligibility rules; some limited exceptions apply. Players may hold more than one non-FIFA nationality.

No.	Pos.	Nation	Player
1	GK	NED	Rob van Dijk
2	DF	NED	André Ooijer
3	DF	KOR	Lee Young-pyo
4	DF	NED	Ernest Faber
5	DF	NED	Wilfred Bouma
6	MF	NED	Mark van Bommel
7	MF	KOR	Park Ji-sung
8	FW	NED	Jan Vennegoor of Hesselink
9	FW	SCG	Mateja Kežman
10	MF	BRA	Leandro
11	MF	NED	Arjen Robben
13	MF	NED	Remco van der Schaaf
14	MF	SUI	Johann Vogel
15	FW	SUI	Johan Vonlanthen
16	DF	NED	Theo Lucius

No.	Pos.	Nation	Player
18	DF	GHA	Eric Addo
19	MF	DEN	Dennis Rommedahl
20	DF	NED	Jürgen Colin
22	MF	NED	Jordi Hoogstrate
23	GK	NED	Ronald Waterreus
24	MF	BRA	Marquinho
25	MF	NED	John de Jong
29	DF	NED	Kevin Hofland
30	DF	DEN	Kasper Bøgelund
48	MF	NED	Ibrahim Afellay
35	DF	DEN	Michael Jakobsen
31	MF	NED	Otman Bakkal
38	MF	BEL	Daniel Guijo-Velasco
32	FW	POR	Edson
