= Michael Lamey =

Dutch former professional footballer (born 1979)

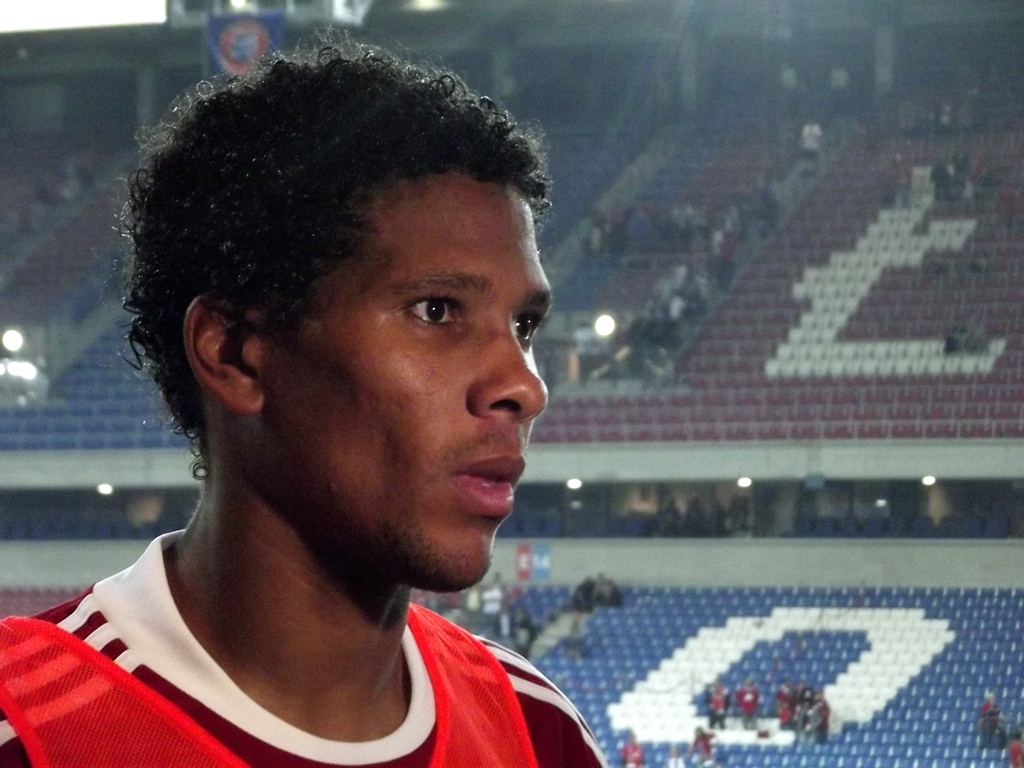
- Lamey with Wisła Kraków in 2011

Personal information
- Full name: Michael Lamey
- Date of birth: 29 November 1979 (age 46)
- Place of birth: Amsterdam, Netherlands
- Height: 1.85 m (6 ft 1 in)
- Position: Right back

Team information
- Current team: Den Bosch U21 (manager)

Youth career
- Ajax

Senior career*
Years	Team	Apps	(Gls)
2000–2002	RKC Waalwijk	47	(3)
2002–2007	PSV	38	(2)
2003	→ AZ (loan)	14	(1)
2003–2004	→ Utrecht (loan)	17	(0)
2007–2008	MSV Duisburg	25	(1)
2008–2010	Arminia Bielefeld	49	(1)
2010–2011	Leicester City	4	(0)
2011–2012	Wisła Kraków	16	(1)
2012–2014	RKC Waalwijk	23	(1)
Total		233	(10)

International career
2000–2001	Netherlands U21	4	(0)

Managerial career
- 2019–2020: Jong FC Eindhoven
- 2024: Ajax U17
- 2024–: Den Bosch U21
- * Club domestic league appearances and goals

Michael Lamey (born 29 November 1979) is a Dutch professional football manager and former player who played as a right-back. He is currently in charge of Den Bosch's under-21 team.

== Playing career ==
Born in Amsterdam, Lamey began his professional career with RKC Waalwijk, before making moves to PSV Eindhoven, MSV Duisburg and Arminia Bielefeld. After his transfer from PSV to Duisburg, the two teams played in a pre-season friendly and Lamey scored an own goal in favour of his previous team. The club was relegated at the end of his first season. He left Arminia Bielefeld at the end of the 2009–10 season following their failure to regain instant promotion back to the German Bundesliga.

On 9 August 2010, Lamey joined Leicester City after impressing the club in a two-week trial. On 11 August, he was part of the reserves squad that won the Totesport.com Cup in a 2–1 win over Oldham Athletic reserves at Quorn FC. After an unsuccessful year with only seven league appearances, he moved to Wisła Kraków in July 2011. At the end of the season, his contract was not extended, leaving him without a club for a few months.

In October 2012, Lamey returned to the Netherlands and signed a three-year contract with his former club RKC Waalwijk in the Eredivisie until the end of June 2015.

== Managerial career ==
After his retirement in 2014, Lamey pursued a career in coaching. In 2018, he began working as a coach in the youth department of FC Eindhoven. The following year, he was promoted to manager of Jong FC Eindhoven, the second team of the club. He was dismissed from the position in January 2020, and replaced by Eric Addo.

== Personal life ==
His mother is Nigerian.

== Honours ==
Utrecht

- KNVB Cup: 2003–04

PSV

- Eredivisie: 2004–05, 2005–06, 2006–07
- KNVB Cup: 2004–05
