= Park Ji-sung =

South Korean footballer (born 1981)

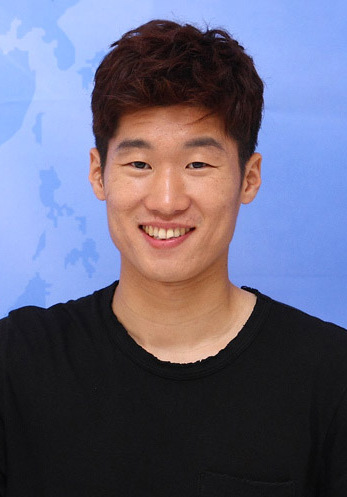
- Park at the G-20 Seoul Summit in 2010

Personal information
- Full name: Park Ji-sung
- Date of birth: 30 March 1981 (age 45) (Note: Park's original date of birth, 25 February 1981, is based on traditional Korean lunisolar calendar. According to the Gregorian calendar, which is commonly used today, his date of birth is 30 March 1981.)
- Place of birth: Seoul, South Korea
- Height: 1.75 m (5 ft 9 in)
- Position: Midfielder

Team information
- Current team: Jeonbuk Hyundai Motors (advisor)

Youth career
- 1993–1995: Anyong Middle School
- 1996–1998: Suwon Technical High School

College career
Years	Team	Apps	(Gls)
1999–2000	Myongji University		

Senior career*
Years	Team	Apps	(Gls)
2000–2003	Kyoto Purple Sanga	76	(11)
2003–2005	PSV Eindhoven	65	(13)
2005–2012	Manchester United	134	(19)
2012–2014	Queens Park Rangers	20	(0)
2013–2014	→ PSV Eindhoven (loan)	23	(2)
Total		318	(45)

International career
2000	South Korea U20	2	(0)
1999–2004	South Korea U23	21	(1)
2000–2011	South Korea	100	(13)
Medal record
Representing South Korea
Men's football
AFC Asian Cup
Third place	2000 Lebanon
Third place	2011 Qatar
Asian Games
Bronze medal – third place	2002 Busan
Korean name
Hangul	박지성
Hanja	朴智星
RR	Bak Jiseong
MR	Pak Chisŏng
IPA	pak̚.t͈ɕi.sʌŋ
- * Club domestic league appearances and goals

Park Ji-sung (Korean: 박지성; pronounced [pak̚.t͈ɕi.sʌŋ]; born 30 March 1981) is a South Korean former professional footballer who played as a midfielder. Born in the South Korean capital of Seoul, Park is regarded as one of the greatest and most successful Asian players in football history, having won 19 trophies in his career. He is the first Asian footballer to win the UEFA Champions League, play in a UEFA Champions League final, and win the FIFA Club World Cup. Park was able to play anywhere across the midfield and was noted for his exceptional fitness level, discipline, work ethic and off-the-ball movement. His remarkable endurance levels earned him the nickname "Three-Lung" Park.

Park began his football career in his native South Korea and played for the Myongji University team before moving to Japan to play for Kyoto Purple Sanga. Park then followed his national team manager Guus Hiddink to the Netherlands to play for PSV Eindhoven. He won two Eredivisie titles, a KNVB Cup, and a Johan Cruyff Shield in Eindhoven before his talents were recognised by Manchester United manager Sir Alex Ferguson as PSV reached the semi-finals of the 2004–05 UEFA Champions League. Park signed for Manchester United for a fee of around £4 million in July 2005, and in his time at United won 11 trophies, including four Premier League titles, the UEFA Champions League and the FIFA Club World Cup. He moved to Queens Park Rangers in 2012 after seven years with Manchester United. However, an injury-interrupted season with QPR, combined with the club's relegation, led to Park rejoining PSV on loan for the 2013–14 season, following which he retired due to a knee injury.

As a member of the South Korea national team, Park won 100 caps and scored 13 goals. He was a member of the team that finished fourth at the 2002 FIFA World Cup, and also represented his nation at the 2006 FIFA World Cup and the 2010 FIFA World Cup. At the World Cup, he was named man of the match four times, the most of any Asian player, and is currently South Korea's joint all-time leading World Cup goalscorer with three goals alongside Ahn Jung-hwan and Son Heung-min, having scored in three consecutive tournaments.

== Early life ==
Park was born in Seoul and grew up in Suwon. He began playing organized football in the fourth grade. Park later recalled that he had initially wanted to play baseball, but third graders could not join his school's team. After football practices began keeping him out late, his father opposed his participation; Park refused to eat until his father relented, on the condition that he would not voluntarily quit the sport. As a sixth grader, he received a national prize from Cha Bum-kun awarded to football prospects.

Park remained small and was frequently ill as a child. After deciding to support his son's career, Park's father, Park Sung-jong, left his company job and opened a butcher shop, which gave him a more flexible schedule and made it easier to provide his son with meat. His family also gave him traditional foods and extracts, including deer blood, frog extract, and deer antler, in the hope of improving his health and growth. From elementary school onward, Park kept training diaries in which he recorded drills, formations, difficulties he had encountered, and his coaches' tactical instructions.

Park's slight build remained a concern when he entered Suwon Technical High School. Believing that intensive training could impede Park's growth, coach Lee Hak-jong initially restricted Park to light work with the ball and sometimes sent him home for weeks at a time to rest and eat. Park and his family initially feared that Lee was trying to force him out, but the coach gradually increased Park's playing time as he developed physically. In 1998, his final year, Park helped Suwon Technical win the high-school division of the 79th Korean National Sports Festival.

Despite the title, Park attracted little interest from university teams as graduation approached, largely because of his size. He had hoped since middle school to attend Korea University, while an effort to join his hometown professional club, Suwon Samsung Bluewings, was also unsuccessful. Lee strongly recommended Park to Myongji University coach Kim Hee-tae, who admitted him after two evaluations. Myongji had already filled its football-admissions allocation, so Kim arranged for Park to be admitted using an unfilled athletic-admissions place assigned to the tennis program.

In early 1999, while in Ulsan with the Olympic squad, Huh Jung-moo, then coach of the South Korea Olympic team, noticed Park in a practice match involving Myongji and invited him to train with the squad for one week. Park's inclusion initially drew criticism because he was slight and largely unknown. On 26 March, Huh named Park among seven newcomers in a 22-player Olympic squad. After earning national selection, Park returned to the Myongji dormitory and continued performing ordinary freshman duties, including fetching water and carrying footballs for teammates.

== Club career ==
=== Kyoto Purple Sanga ===
Park began his professional career in Japan while still enrolled at Myongji University. On 15 May 2000, at age 19, he agreed to a one-year contract with Kyoto Purple Sanga that was to take effect on 1 June. Bunji Kimura, then the club's head of recruitment, had traveled to South Korea with five J.League scouts intending to assess Jeon Kwang-jin. Kimura later said that Park, despite carrying an injury and playing only about 20 minutes in a practice match, impressed him with his awareness, stamina, and potential. He recalled that recruiting the largely unknown Park drew criticism within the club and even calls for his resignation.

Park made his league debut on 24 June and scored his first league goal on 11 November. He finished the season with one goal in 13 league appearances as the club placed 15th overall and was relegated to the J2 League.

From his second season, Park played mainly as a holding midfielder. He made 38 league appearances and scored three goals in 2001 as Kyoto accumulated 84 points, won the J2 title, and returned to the J1 League. Park later identified the 10 November victory over Shonan Bellmare, which secured the championship and promotion, as one of his most memorable matches in Japan because it also strengthened his hope of playing at the 2002 FIFA World Cup. Looking back in 2018, Park credited teammate Kazuyoshi Miura as teaching him how a professional footballer should conduct himself.

On 20 July 2002, shortly after returning from the World Cup, Park came on as a 56th-minute substitute and scored a 113th-minute golden goal in a 2–1 away victory over Vissel Kobe. Teammate Teruaki Kurobe later recalled that manager Gert Engels moved Park from holding midfield to the right side of a front three completed by Kurobe and Daisuke Matsui. According to Kurobe, the switch became a turning point after which the team improved. Park finished the campaign with seven goals in 25 league appearances as Kyoto placed fifth overall, and he was among the recipients of the J.League's 2002 Excellent Player Award.

Kyoto's run to the Emperor's Cup final came as Park prepared to leave for PSV Eindhoven while managing accumulated fatigue and a right-knee injury. He had unusually asked to be substituted late in the quarterfinal and was also withdrawn during the semifinal, but said that he wanted to help Kyoto win the first title in the club's history before departing. In the final against Kashima Antlers on 1 January 2003, Park headed in Shingo Suzuki's free kick five minutes into the second half to equalize. Park was substituted in the 88th minute to applause from the crowd as Kyoto won 2–1 to claim their first major trophy. Park later recalled that Kazuo Inamori, the founder of the club's principal sponsor Kyocera, told him that he would support Park wherever he went, that Park could return at any time, and that the club would wait even if an injury left him unable to play.

Across his three seasons with Kyoto, Park recorded 76 league appearances and 11 goals, three League Cup appearances, and six Emperor's Cup appearances with one goal—85 appearances and 12 goals in all competitions.

=== PSV Eindhoven ===
PSV began pursuing Park in the autumn of 2002. Director of football Frank Arnesen felt that Park had the quality to play for the club, could fill several positions, and be signed without paying a transfer fee. PSV agreed a contract with him through the summer of 2006, reuniting him with his former South Korea coach Guus Hiddink; international teammate Lee Young-pyo joined the club shortly afterward. Park arrived in Eindhoven on the evening of 7 February 2003 and made his Eredivisie debut the following day, coming on as a substitute in a 1–0 away win over RKC Waalwijk.

The knee problem and accumulated fatigue that Park had carried from Japan soon interrupted his first season. In March, Hiddink rested him and said that the injury was probably related to overuse, noting that Park had gone about four years without a vacation. An arthroscopic operation later that month repaired damage to his meniscus; although the club initially feared that he would miss the remainder of the season, Park returned in May. Park made eight league appearances as PSV won the 2002–03 Eredivisie.

Park's adjustment to the Netherlands was complicated by language and cultural barriers. PSV arranged an interpreter and Dutch and English lessons for Park and Lee, but Park later recalled that the two sometimes ran in the wrong direction during training drills because they had misunderstood the instructions. He also experienced homesickness and felt isolated from his teammates. As his form suffered, sections of the home support began jeering him. After Park struggled during a Champions League home match against Deportivo de La Coruña in December 2003, Hiddink said that Park had no comparable difficulty in away matches, described the home crowd as his "biggest enemy," and announced that he would temporarily rest him for home fixtures. Park later said that Hiddink helped him adapt by using him more often in away matches than at home.

Park later recalled that the jeering began when he entered as a substitute and resumed whenever he touched the ball, making football frightening to him for the first time. He rebuilt his confidence by praising himself for completing simple passes and identified PSV's 0–0 UEFA Cup draw away to Perugia on 26 February 2004 as the match in which his outlook changed. A month later, Park wrote that the PSV supporters were no longer booing him and were instead giving him strong encouragement.

By the 2004–05 season, Park had become an established starter. PSV advanced from the Champions League group stage for the first time in the club's history, and Park became central to their run. After a 1–1 draw away to Olympique Lyonnais in the first leg of the quarterfinals, Hiddink called him a complete midfielder who was equally effective in attack and defense. In the return match, Park won the free kick from which Alex equalized; PSV prevailed in a penalty shootout to reach their first European Cup semifinal in 17 years.

After PSV lost 0–2 away to AC Milan in the first leg of the semifinal, Hiddink moved Park from the right flank to a position behind Jan Vennegoor of Hesselink for the return. Park opened the scoring in the ninth minute and combined his attacking role with sustained pressing and tracking; UEFA's match report described him as the "beating heart" of the Philips Stadion. PSV won 3–1, but Milan advanced with the aggregate score tied 3–3 under the away-goals rule.

Park also played a direct part in PSV's domestic double. On 23 April, he scored from 20 meters and crossed for Mark van Bommel's goal in a 3–0 win over Vitesse that secured the league title with four matches remaining. In the 2005 KNVB Cup final on 29 May, he headed PSV's third goal in a 4–0 victory over Willem II, completing the club's first league-and-cup double since 1989. By then, the supporters' chant for Park—set to Pigbag's "Papa's Got a Brand New Pigbag"—had been recorded as "Song for Park" and included as track 16 on PSV's 23-track championship album.

For his performances that season, UEFA later named Park one of five nominees for the 2005 Best Forward award, alongside Adriano, Samuel Eto'o, Ronaldinho and Andriy Shevchenko. Manchester United manager Sir Alex Ferguson later wrote that, while assessing Lyon midfielder Michael Essien during PSV's Champions League quarterfinal tie against Lyon, Park's movement and ability to find space caught his attention. Ferguson sent his brother Martin, a United scout, to watch Park the following week; after Martin reached the same assessment, United began pursuing him. PSV had sought to extend Park's contract through 2009, and Hiddink urged him to remain, suggesting that he could later move to Chelsea. Park nevertheless chose United and later said that leaving PSV felt as though he were betraying Hiddink. On 22 June, PSV agreed to transfer him to United for a reported £4 million. He ended his first PSV spell with 92 appearances and 17 goals in all competitions.

=== Manchester United ===
==== 2005–06 season ====
Park's work permit application was initially refused because he had not met the automatic requirement to have played in 75 percent of South Korea's recent internationals. Ferguson attended the successful appeal hearing and Park completed his transfer in July 2005. Contemporary coverage questioned whether United's commercial ambitions in Asia had influenced the move; Park said that he wanted to demonstrate his value as a footballer rather than as part of a marketing strategy.

Park made his competitive debut on 9 August, replacing Roy Keane in the 67th minute of a 3–0 win over Debrecen in the Champions League third qualifying round. Four days later, he started United's league opener, a 2–0 away victory over Everton, and became the first South Korean to play in the Premier League. Park described adapting to Western football culture as a greater challenge for Korean players than playing ability: teammates immediately pointed out mistakes, while players were expected to speak openly with their managers, something he acknowledged in October that he had not yet dared to do with Ferguson.

His most influential early league performance came in a 3–2 win at Fulham on 1 October. Playing on the right as United returned to a 4–4–2 formation, Park won the penalty from which Ruud van Nistelrooy equalized, supplied the final pass for Wayne Rooney's goal, and crossed for Van Nistelrooy to score the winner, contributing directly to all three United goals. On 18 October, he wore the captain's armband during the closing minutes of a goalless Champions League draw with Lille after replacing Ryan Giggs. This resulted from a misunderstanding: Giggs had intended Park to carry the armband to Rio Ferdinand, but Park believed that he was being asked to wear it himself.

Park scored his first competitive United goal on 20 December, completing an exchange with Louis Saha with a left-footed finish in a 3–1 League Cup quarterfinal victory at Birmingham City. He subsequently started the final on 26 February 2006, when United defeated Wigan Athletic 4–0 to give him his first English trophy. Earlier that month, a deflected shot against Fulham had initially been credited to Park, but the Premier League's Dubious Goals Panel later recorded it as an own goal by Carlos Bocanegra.

By late March, Ferguson praised Park's movement and willingness to find space for adding speed and a different dimension to United's play, while identifying his low goal total as an area to improve. Park scored his first official Premier League goal on 9 April, converting Rooney's pass to complete a 2–0 home victory over Arsenal. Eight days later, he dispossessed South Korea teammate Lee Young-pyo inside the penalty area and set up Rooney's decisive goal in a 2–1 win at Tottenham Hotspur; The Guardian named Park the match's outstanding player for his running and tenacity. A photograph taken moments after the goal showed Park, his head lowered, discreetly extending a hand toward Lee, who clasped it while looking away; the image attracted considerable attention in South Korea. Park later explained that he had felt sorry for Lee and, unable to embrace an opposing player, placed his hand over Lee's as he passed, which Lee then grasped.

Park finished his debut season with two goals in 45 appearances in all competitions.

==== 2006–07 season ====
In August 2006, Park signed a contract extension that committed him to United through 2010. His second season was interrupted on 9 September, when he tore ankle ligaments after entering a 1–0 win over Tottenham as a substitute. An operation was required, and he was ruled out for up to three months. Park returned in December and made his first league start since August in a 3–1 victory over Wigan on 26 December, winning the penalty from which Cristiano Ronaldo scored United's second goal.

All five of Park's league goals that season came after his return. On 13 January 2007, he scored the opening goal in a 3–1 win over Aston Villa, exchanged passes with Michael Carrick for the second, and dispossessed Gavin McCann in the buildup to Ronaldo's third goal. He headed the opener in a 2–0 win over Charlton Athletic on 10 February, then scored his first Premier League brace as United defeated Bolton Wanderers 4–1 on 17 March, with Ronaldo creating both goals. In a 4–1 comeback victory over Blackburn Rovers on 31 March, Park scored from the rebound of a Ronaldo free kick and crossed for Ole Gunnar Solskjær to score United's fourth goal.

The Blackburn match proved to be Park's final appearance of the season. After a problem in his right knee failed to improve and United could not determine its cause, Park was sent to specialist Richard Steadman in Colorado. Steadman performed what the club described as a complicated cartilage operation in late April, ending Park's campaign. Park finished with five goals and two assists in 14 league appearances, and made 20 appearances in all competitions. United secured the league championship while he was sidelined, making Park the first Asian player to become a Premier League champion.

==== 2007–08 season ====
Park missed the first half of the season while rehabilitating from his knee operation. In August 2007, he said that he expected to play again in January and would undergo months of intensive rehabilitation upon returning to England. Several reserve-team fixtures in which he hoped to test his fitness were then canceled because of weather and pitch conditions. Park instead returned directly to senior action on 26 December, playing more than half an hour as a substitute in a 4–0 win at Sunderland after nine months out. Ferguson said that Park's movement and energy would give the side an additional dimension. His first start since the operation came against Birmingham City on 1 January 2008; Park played 75 minutes, and Ferguson rated him and Nemanja Vidić as United's best players in the 1–0 victory. On 1 March, Park scored his only goal of the season, heading in a Paul Scholes cross during a 3–0 win at Fulham. He made 12 league appearances, eight of them starts, as United retained the Premier League title.

Once fit, Park's most prominent contribution came in the Champions League. He completed all 90 minutes of United's four matches from the quarterfinals through the semifinals. In a 2–0 first-leg win at Roma, Ferguson selected him ahead of Ryan Giggs in anticipation of a physically demanding match. Park headed Wes Brown's deep cross back across goal before Doni fumbled the ball and Wayne Rooney scored United's second. In the first leg against Barcelona at the Camp Nou, Park and Rooney were deployed wide to provide defensive cover for the fullbacks, with Park and Patrice Evra doubling up against Lionel Messi as United secured a 0–0 draw. In the return leg, he moved infield from the left and at times appeared at center forward within United's fluid attacking formation; Scholes' goal gave United a 1–0 victory and a place in the final.

Days before the final against Chelsea, Ferguson said that Park had a strong chance of selection and praised his professionalism, intelligence, and off-the-ball movement. He nevertheless omitted Park from the entire 18-man matchday squad. Park later recalled that the news stunned him so much that he initially failed to understand that he would not even be on the bench: he prepared as usual and realized the situation only when no shirt had been laid out for him in the dressing room. United defeated Chelsea on penalties, and Park said afterward that he was happy for the team but personally frustrated at missing the match. Ferguson later called leaving him out the hardest decision of his managerial career.

==== 2008–09 season ====
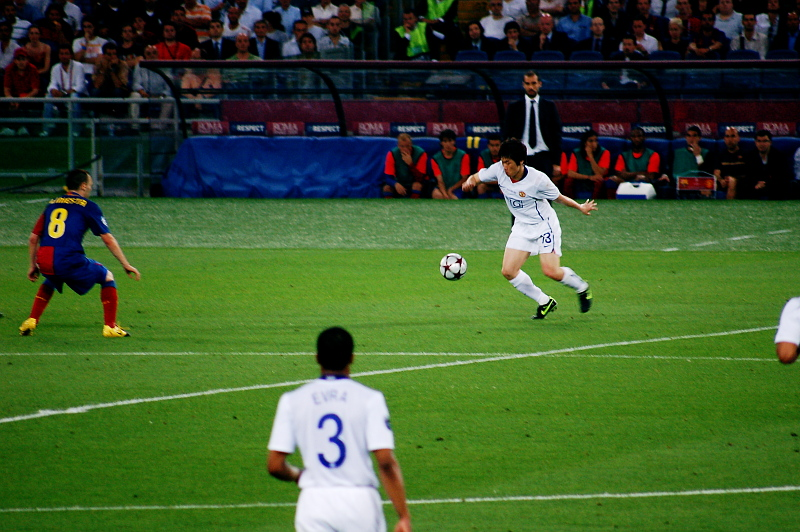
Park during the 2009 UEFA Champions League Final against Barcelona

Park scored his first goal of the season on 21 September 2008, reacting after Petr Čech parried Dimitar Berbatov's shot to give United the lead in a 1–1 draw at Chelsea. On 13 December, he made his 100th competitive appearance for United and played the full match in a 0–0 draw at Tottenham Hotspur. Later that month, he was an unused substitute in the FIFA Club World Cup semifinal against Gamba Osaka before starting the final against L.D.U. Quito. Park completed the match as ten-man United won 1–0, becoming the first English club to win the tournament in its expanded format.

Park's increasingly prominent role remained tailored to specific opponents. He explained that Ferguson selected players according to the requirements of each match and rotated the squad to keep them fresh; UEFA identified Park's work rate and intelligent movement as representative of United's squad strength. By March 2009, The Observer described him as integral to Ferguson's plans; Rio Ferdinand similarly cited Park's off-the-ball movement and intelligence as qualities that gave the team a different dimension. On 7 March, Park intercepted a loose pass and curled in the last goal of a 4–0 FA Cup quarterfinal win at Fulham, his first goal in the competition. On 2 May, he completed a move begun by Rooney's reverse pass to score in a 2–0 victory at Middlesbrough, which moved United six points clear with four league matches remaining. United secured a third consecutive league title with a 0–0 draw against Arsenal on 16 May; after entering in the 67th minute, Park had a goal disallowed by what The Observer called a "highly questionable" offside decision.

Park said that his omission from the previous season's Champions League final had been the greatest disappointment of his career and that he used it as motivation to earn another opportunity. In the second leg of the semifinal at Arsenal on 5 May, he capitalized on Kieran Gibbs' slip to open the scoring after eight minutes, then helped launch the counterattack from which Cristiano Ronaldo scored United's third goal. United won 3–1 and advanced 4–1 on aggregate. Ferguson started Park against Barcelona in the final on 27 May, making him the first Asian player to appear in a Champions League final. Early in the match, Gerard Piqué prevented him from converting the rebound from a Ronaldo free kick; Barcelona went on to win 2–0.

==== 2009–10 season ====
On 18 September 2009, Park signed a two-year contract extension that kept him at United until 2012. Ferguson described him as an important and versatile member of the squad. His early season was then disrupted by swelling in his right knee. After Park played the full 90 minutes for South Korea against Senegal on 14 October, Ferguson said that the return journey had left the knee swollen, although United did not understand why. When Park joined South Korea for two friendlies in Europe the following month, United sent its senior fitness coach to Denmark to brief the national-team staff on his condition, rehabilitation and future workload; South Korea agreed to limit him to between 50 and 70 minutes in each match. Park returned on 25 November, playing 67 minutes of a 1–0 Champions League loss to Beşiktaş after missing 13 consecutive United matches.

Park scored his first goal of the season on 31 January 2010, running onto Michael Carrick's chipped pass and finishing at the near post as United won 3–1 away to Arsenal. On 28 February, he started the League Cup final against Aston Villa and struck the post shortly before halftime. United won 2–1 to retain the trophy.

During the second half of the season, Ferguson used Park in an advanced central role in several major matches. In the first leg of United's Champions League round-of-16 tie against AC Milan, Park was assigned to restrict playmaker Andrea Pirlo and covered a match-high 12.1 km (7.5 mi) as United won 3–2 at San Siro. Ferguson repeated the assignment in the return match on 10 March; Park also ran onto Paul Scholes's pass and scored United's third goal in a 4–0 victory, completing a 7–2 aggregate win. Ferguson praised Park's "sacrifice, intelligence and discipline" against Pirlo.

Eleven days later, Park again played behind Wayne Rooney, this time against Liverpool. He moved ahead of Glen Johnson to meet Darren Fletcher's cross with a diving header in the 60th minute, securing a 2–1 victory that returned United to the top of the league. Park later selected it as his best United goal, citing both the rivalry and the 1–1 score at the time. On the final day of the season, Park came off the bench and scored with a stooping header from a Ryan Giggs corner in a 4–0 win over Stoke City. The victory was not enough to retain the league title, which Chelsea won by one point.

==== 2010–11 season ====
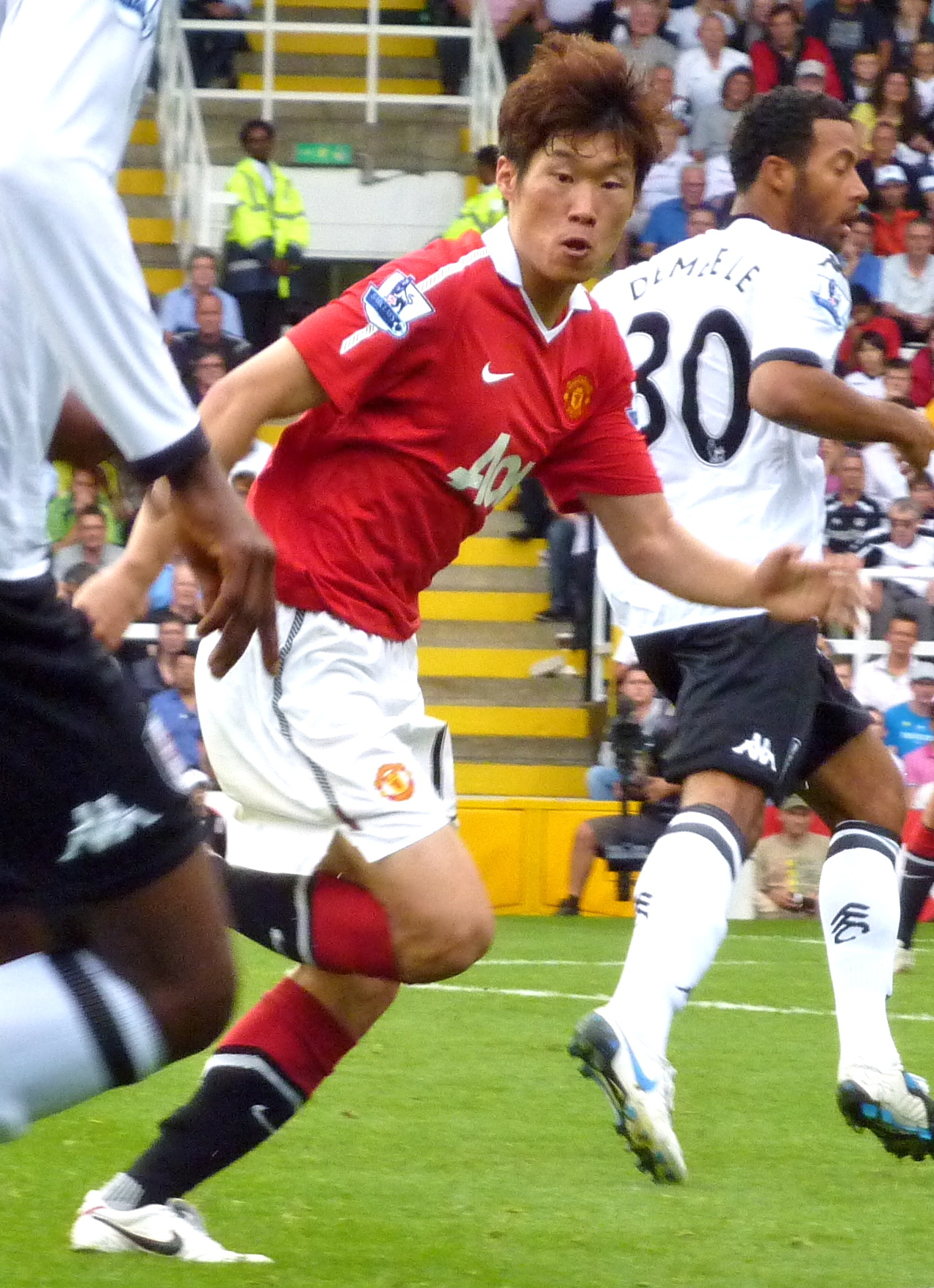
Park during a match against Fulham in 2010

Park's first competitive goals of the season came in successive League Cup rounds. In a 5–2 win at Scunthorpe United on 22 September, he crossed for Chris Smalling, scored United's fourth goal and produced the shot that the goalkeeper spilled for Michael Owen to score the fifth; he then scored in a 3–2 fourth-round victory over Wolverhampton Wanderers on 26 October.

Park carried that productivity into the league. With United weakened by illness and injuries on 6 November, he scored both goals in a 2–1 victory over Wolves: he converted Fletcher's pass shortly before halftime and, in the third minute of stoppage time, cut in from the right and drove in the winner. Ferguson subsequently described Park as one of United's best players of the preceding weeks. Three weeks later, Park completed a one-two with Rooney to score in a 7–1 defeat of Blackburn Rovers, which took United to the top of the Premier League for the first time that season. On 13 December, he adjusted his body to loop a header from Nani's deflected cross into the net for the only goal against Arsenal, moving United two points clear with a game in hand. The goal was his sixth of the season, already a personal high for a United campaign, and the club's supporters voted him their Player of the Month for both November and December.

After playing against Sunderland on 26 December, Park left to captain South Korea at the 2011 AFC Asian Cup, missing seven United matches during the tournament. Shortly after returning to training in February, he injured a hamstring with the final kick of a training session and was ruled out for four weeks. Park did not make his next club appearance until 2 April, starting in a 4–2 comeback victory at West Ham United after more than three months without playing for United.

Four days after returning, Park started the first leg of United's Champions League quarterfinal against Chelsea, a 1–0 victory at Stamford Bridge. Ferguson explained that he had selected Park to help contain Chelsea's overloaded midfield, describing him as "fantastic" tactically and pointing to his energy on the counterattack. In the second leg on 12 April, Didier Drogba's 77th-minute equalizer gave ten-man Chelsea brief hope of recovering the tie, but less than 60 seconds later Park received Giggs's pass and scored with a left-footed finish to secure a 2–1 victory and a 3–1 aggregate win.

On 8 May, in a league match that largely decided the title race, Park's through ball released Javier Hernández to score after 37 seconds in a 2–1 victory over Chelsea. Playing narrowly from the left and interchanging with Giggs, Park also helped United offset Chelsea's numerical advantage in central midfield. The result left United needing one point from its final two matches, which the club secured at Blackburn six days later to give Park his fourth Premier League title.

With the title secured, Park scored United's opening goal and assisted Anderson's equalizer in a 4–2 victory over Blackpool on the final day of the league season. It was his eighth goal of the season, the highest total of his United career. On 28 May, he played the full match on the left of midfield in his second Champions League final. United's pressing restricted Barcelona during the opening minutes, with Park closing down Dani Alves, but Barcelona took control and won 3–1 at Wembley.

==== 2011–12 season ====
On 12 August 2011, Park signed a new contract that was to keep him at Manchester United through the end of the 2012–13 season. Ferguson described his ability, energy, and experience as valuable to the younger players being introduced into the team. Park scored as a substitute in an 8–2 victory over Arsenal on 28 August, and converted Patrice Evra's cutback to open a 5–0 win against Wigan Athletic on 26 December. His third and final goal of the season came in the fourth round of the FA Cup on 28 January 2012, when he met Rafael's cross to equalize against Liverpool at Anfield; United were eliminated by Dirk Kuyt's late winner.

On 5 February, Park made his 200th United appearance when he entered in the 86th minute of a 3–3 draw at Chelsea, becoming the 92nd player to reach the milestone for the club. On 23 February, he led United out as starting captain for the first time, against Ajax in the Europa League. Park intercepted Jan Vertonghen's pass during the buildup to Javier Hernández's early goal; although United lost the second leg 2–1, they advanced 3–2 on aggregate.

Park made 28 appearances in all competitions during the season but started only 10 Premier League matches. His first league start since January came in the title-race Manchester derby on 30 April, when he was assigned to stay close to Yaya Touré as part of a compact midfield. The tactic initially restricted City, but Park was replaced by Danny Welbeck in the 58th minute as United pursued an equalizer; Manchester City won 1–0 and moved above United on goal difference with two matches remaining. Ferguson later wrote that Park had performed his assigned role well before City scored. Park later said that being omitted for five consecutive matches while fit—the first such run of his United career—convinced him to seek more regular football, even though the club wanted him to remain.

=== Queens Park Rangers ===
On 9 July 2012, Park joined Queens Park Rangers on a two-year contract. The BBC reported an initial fee of £2 million, potentially rising to £5 million. United manager Ferguson and chief executive David Gill had wanted to retain him, but Park considered his opportunities limited and chose QPR's plans over more lucrative offers. Park said that chairman Tony Fernandes and manager Mark Hughes traveling to Seoul during negotiations convinced him that QPR genuinely wanted him; his father added that Hughes had explained in detail how he intended to use Park.

Hughes named Park club captain, citing his experience and character. Park made his competitive debut wearing the armband in a 5–0 home defeat to Swansea City on 18 August. QPR failed to win any of their first 12 league matches, and Hughes was dismissed on 23 November with the club bottom of the table. Park later recalled that he was sidelined by a knee injury when Harry Redknapp replaced Hughes and that the new manager used him less frequently after he recovered. Clint Hill captained the team during Park's absence and retained the armband after Park returned; QPR formally named Hill captain for the remainder of the season on 23 January 2013.

Park returned to a central role during March. Playing in an advanced position against Southampton on 2 March, he beat Maya Yoshida on the right and delivered the low cross from which Jay Bothroyd scored a 77th-minute winner in a 2–1 victory. A week later, Redknapp paired Park with Stéphane Mbia in a two-man central midfield during a 3–1 win over Sunderland and said that the selection had paid off.

QPR's relegation was confirmed following a goalless draw at Reading on 28 April. Park made 25 appearances in all competitions during his only season at the club; 20 of them, including 15 starts, came in the Premier League, where he did not score.

=== Return to PSV and retirement ===
Following QPR's relegation, Park returned to PSV on 8 August 2013 on a season-long loan, eight years after leaving the Dutch club. The move reunited him with head coach Phillip Cocu, his teammate during the 2004–05 season. Cocu wanted Park's experience and versatility for a very young squad, while Park said that Cocu's enthusiasm for the project had helped persuade him to return; Voetbal International reported that he accepted a substantial reduction in his QPR salary to make the move. Park made his competitive return on 20 August, starting on the right wing in a 1–1 home draw with AC Milan in the first leg of their Champions League play-off. He played 68 minutes, contributed to the buildup for Tim Matavž's equalizer, and received a standing ovation when substituted.

Four days later, Park came on as a substitute and scored an 86th-minute equalizer in a 1–1 draw away to Heracles Almelo. On 22 September, he played a prominent part in a 4–0 home victory over defending champions Ajax. Park found the unmarked Oscar Hiljemark for PSV's third goal and then beat Ajax's offside trap to score the fourth, completing a sequence in which PSV scored four times in 15 second-half minutes and moved to the top of the Eredivisie.

On 28 September, Viktor Elm kicked Park on the ankle during a defeat at AZ Alkmaar. The injury kept him out for more than two months. In his first league start after the injury, Park helped PSV beat FC Utrecht 5–1 on 15 December to end a run of seven Eredivisie matches without a victory. Cocu described him as an important link in PSV's system. Cocu later moved Park from the right into central midfield, where he played alongside Stijn Schaars and Hiljemark during a six-match winning run. PSV technical manager Marcel Brands valued Park's influence both on and off the field but noted that it was taking him increasingly long to recover after matches.

Park made 27 appearances in all competitions and scored twice as PSV finished fourth. His final competitive match was a 2–0 home victory over NAC Breda on 3 May, when he was substituted in the 90th minute to an ovation. On 14 May, Park announced his retirement at age 33 at a press conference in Suwon, explaining that his chronic knee problems meant that he could no longer perform at the highest level. He nevertheless accompanied PSV on a postseason farewell tour of South Korea. His final appearance in a club shirt came in a friendly against Gyeongnam FC on 24 May; after being substituted in the 53rd minute, he was carried around the field by his teammates, and his final shirt was donated to the PSV Museum.

== International career ==
=== Early career ===
Park's first national selection came with the South Korea Olympic team, before he had represented his country at any other youth level. On 27 May 1999, two months after his first call-up, he started at wing-back in a 7–0 victory over Chinese Taipei in the first round of qualification for the 2000 Olympic tournament. He later appeared in final-round qualifying victories over China and Bahrain as South Korea secured a place in Sydney.

Park's brief under-20 career followed his Olympic- and senior-team debuts. He played in a 1–1 friendly draw with Japan in September 2000 and later joined South Korea at the 2000 AFC Youth Championship in Tehran. His club, Kyoto Purple Sanga, retained him for two league matches, so he arrived after the opening defeat by China. Coach Cho Young-jeung used him as a central playmaker, including in a 7–0 victory over Pakistan. South Korea nevertheless finished third in its group and failed to qualify for the 2001 FIFA World Youth Championship.

Park made his senior international debut under Huh on 5 April 2000, playing in South Korea's 9–0 victory over Laos in an Asian Cup qualifier at Dongdaemun Stadium. His selection was initially questioned because of his slight build and tendency to make mistakes, and he was still regarded as one of several prospects rather than an established international. He scored his first senior goal on 7 June in a 2–1 victory over Macedonia at a four-nation tournament in Tehran. Later that year, Park appeared in five of South Korea's six matches at the 2000 AFC Asian Cup, including all three knockout matches, as the team finished third.

At the 2000 Summer Olympics, head coach Huh Jung-moo used Park principally in a defensive role. He started and completed all three group matches: a 3–0 defeat by eventual silver medalists Spain and consecutive 1–0 victories over Morocco and eventual bronze medalists Chile. South Korea played almost the entire Chile match with ten men following Lee Chun-soo's early dismissal. Spain, Chile and South Korea each finished with six points, but South Korea placed third on goal difference and was eliminated.

=== 2002 World Cup ===
After Guus Hiddink became head coach, Park spent much of 2001 as a defensive midfielder alongside Lee Young-pyo. His stamina, movement and ability to connect defense and attack suited Hiddink's emphasis on pressing and positional versatility. Park played in all three of South Korea's matches at the 2001 FIFA Confederations Cup: a 5–0 loss to France and victories over Mexico and Australia. Against Mexico, his late corner was headed in by Yoo Sang-chul for the winning goal. South Korea collected six points but was eliminated on goal difference.

Hiddink began testing Park as a central attacking midfielder late in 2001 and continued the experiment at the 2002 CONCACAF Gold Cup. Park played in South Korea's first three matches, but an Achilles-tendon injury kept him out of the semifinal and third-place match as the team finished fourth. During a European tour in March, he appeared only as a substitute against Turkey: Kim Nam-il had secured the defensive-midfield position, while Yoon Jung-hwan had emerged in the attacking role. Hiddink responded by moving Park to right wing-forward in his 3–4–3 formation, beginning with the 27 April draw against China. The position used Park's penetration and defensive work, with Park and right wing-back Song Chong-gug alternating their forward runs and Park dropping into midfield when South Korea defended.

In South Korea's final two warm-up matches before the World Cup, Park scored against England and France. On 21 May, he headed a 52nd-minute equalizer in a 1–1 draw with England after Choi Jin-cheul flicked on a corner. Five days later, he received a long pass from Kim Nam-il, beat France captain Marcel Desailly and scored left-footed in a 3–2 defeat to the defending world champions. Park later selected the France match as the best of his career, explaining that the goal gave him confidence in his new attacking role and convinced him that he could compete at World Cup level.

At the 2002 FIFA World Cup, Park started South Korea's opening 2–0 victory over Poland, the country's first win at a World Cup. During the following 1–1 draw with the United States, an opponent stepped on his left ankle and Park was substituted in the 38th minute. The injury caused concern that he would miss the decisive group match against Portugal, but he recovered sufficiently after treatment and a private fitness test to retain his starting place.

After Portugal had been reduced to nine players, Park received Lee Young-pyo's cross from the left, controlled the ball with his chest, beat Sérgio Conceição and scored left-footed through goalkeeper Vítor Baía's legs in the 70th minute. The 1–0 victory took South Korea into the knockout stage for the first time and left them top of their group; FIFA named Park the match's outstanding player.

Park remained the right-sided member of Hiddink's front three and started every match of South Korea's run to fourth place. He played throughout the golden-goal victory over Italy in the round of 16 and the scoreless quarterfinal against Spain. Against Spain, Iker Casillas saved Park's second-half volley before Park converted South Korea's second kick in the 5–3 penalty shootout victory. He also started the 1–0 semifinal loss to Germany and the 3–2 third-place defeat to Turkey. South Korea's fourth-place finish made it the first Asian team to reach a World Cup semifinal.

=== 2002 Asian Games ===
Park returned to the under-23 side at the 2002 Asian Games in Busan. Because of his commitments to Kyoto, he missed the group stage and joined Park Hang-seo's squad on 7 October. The coach intended to use him as the link between midfield and attack, a role the team had lacked during the preliminary round. Park played in all three knockout matches: a 1–0 quarterfinal win over Bahrain, a goalless semifinal against Iran that South Korea lost 5–3 on penalties, and a 3–0 victory over Thailand in the bronze-medal match.

=== 2004 Asian Cup ===
Still age-eligible in 2004, Park appeared in two matches in the final round of Olympic qualification, both against China. He played as an attacking midfielder in a 1–0 home victory on 3 March and as the playmaker in a 2–0 away win on 1 May that secured South Korea's fifth consecutive Olympic berth. He did not participate in the Athens finals because PSV declined to release him while its UEFA Champions League qualifiers overlapped with the Olympic tournament; Park instead joined the senior team for the 2004 AFC Asian Cup.

After making only one senior appearance in 2003, Park returned to regular international duty in 2004. At the 2004 AFC Asian Cup, he appeared as a substitute in South Korea's 2–0 group-stage victory over the United Arab Emirates, then played in the 4–0 win over Kuwait and the quarterfinal against Iran. In the quarterfinal, Park supplied the cross from which Seol Ki-hyeon scored South Korea's first equalizer, but Iran won 4–3 through an Ali Karimi hat-trick.

=== 2006 World Cup ===
Park played eight matches during South Korea's 2006 World Cup qualifying campaign. By the final round, he was used principally as an attacking midfielder behind the forwards, although his role continued to vary with the team's formation. On 8 June 2005, he scored the final goal in a 4–0 away victory over Kuwait that secured South Korea's place at the finals. It was his first international goal since his winner against Portugal at the 2002 World Cup.

Park's positional versatility made him central to Dick Advocaat's plans for the 2006 FIFA World Cup. Advocaat used him as a wide forward in a 3–4–3 and as an attacking midfielder in a 4–3–3. In the opening match against Togo, Park was brought down by captain Jean-Paul Abalo as he approached goal, earning Abalo a second yellow card. Lee Chun-soo scored from the resulting free kick as South Korea came from behind to win 2–1. Against eventual runners-up France, Park scored an 81st-minute equalizer after Cho Jae-jin headed a deep cross back across goal. FIFA's Technical Study Group selected him as the match's outstanding player. South Korea was eliminated after losing its final group match 2–0 to Switzerland.

=== Captaincy and 2010 World Cup ===
Park appeared in Asian Cup qualifiers against Iran and Taiwan later in 2006 and in two friendlies in early 2007. In April 2007, he underwent a complicated cartilage operation on his right knee in the United States, ruling him out of that July's 2007 AFC Asian Cup. South Korea finished third in his absence, and Park did not return to international competition until February 2008.

In October 2008, with incumbent captain Kim Nam-il suspended for a World Cup qualifier against the United Arab Emirates, the national-team players unanimously selected Park as captain. He first wore the armband in a 3–0 friendly victory over Uzbekistan on 11 October and retained it thereafter. Rather than adopting the forceful style associated with Kim, Park acted as an intermediary between the coaching staff and players: he canvassed teammates' views and raised their concerns about training and scheduling. Contemporary reporting described this as a quieter, participatory form of leadership, while Park said that the captain remained only "one of eleven" players. In his second match as captain, he scored and assisted Lee Keun-ho in a 4–1 qualifying victory over the United Arab Emirates.

Park scored five times during qualification for the 2010 FIFA World Cup, including late equalizers in both matches against Iran. In Tehran in February 2009, he headed in the rebound from Ki Sung-yueng's free kick in the 80th minute to earn a 1–1 draw. With qualification already secured, he combined with Lee Keun-ho before scoring with his left foot in the return match in Seoul on 17 June. The goal earned another 1–1 draw and dealt a decisive blow to Iran's qualification hopes.

On 24 May 2010, Park opened the scoring in a 2–0 pre-World Cup friendly victory over Japan in Saitama, advancing through midfield and shooting from the edge of the penalty area. His slow run in front of the home supporters afterward became known in South Korea as the "Saitama stroll"; Park later said that it was a defiant response to the crowd booing his name before kickoff.

Park captained South Korea in all four of their matches at the World Cup in South Africa. In the opening match against Greece, he intercepted a misplaced pass, evaded two defenders and finished left-footed to complete a 2–0 victory. Having also scored in 2002 and 2006, he became the first Asian player to score at three consecutive World Cups. Park was named player of the match against both Greece and Nigeria, the latter a 2–2 draw that sent South Korea into the knockout stage at a World Cup outside its own country for the first time. Their run ended with a 2–1 loss to Uruguay in the round of 16. Park finished his three World Cups with 14 appearances and three goals.

=== 2011 Asian Cup and retirement ===
Park remained captain under Cho Kwang-rae and led a younger squad at the 2011 AFC Asian Cup. He started South Korea's first five matches, including consecutive matches against Iran and Japan that went to extra time, but did not score. The semifinal against Japan on 25 January was his 100th recognized senior international. Park won a first-half penalty, converted by Ki Sung-yueng, but Japan prevailed 3–0 in a shootout after a 2–2 draw. Park later said that he had entered the competition knowing it would be his last and that the defeat had ended his final opportunity to win the continental title. Organizers shortlisted him for the tournament's Most Valuable Player award.

Swelling in Park's right knee kept him out of the 3–2 third-place playoff victory over Uzbekistan, which he watched from the bench. On 31 January, he announced his international retirement with 100 appearances and 13 goals over nearly eleven years. Park said that recurring pain and swelling in his surgically repaired right knee were aggravated by long-distance travel from Europe. He also wanted to give emerging players such as Koo Ja-cheol, Ji Dong-won and Son Heung-min opportunities in major matches. He rejected the idea of returning only for the 2014 World Cup, reasoning that the players who earned qualification should also receive the opportunity to play at the finals.

In January 2014, national-team coach Hong Myung-bo nevertheless sought a conversation with Park about a possible return, believing that his experience could balance a young squad. After meeting Park in the Netherlands the following month, Hong said that Park's knees were in worse condition than he had realized and accepted his decision to remain retired; Park offered to assist the national team in another capacity.

== Style of play ==
Park was a versatile two-way midfielder, who could operate centrally in a box-to-box role, on either flank, in a holding role, or in a more advanced role as either an attacking midfielder or second striker. His position evolved over his career: under Guus Hiddink he developed from deeper midfield roles into a winger and attacking midfielder; at Manchester United he was used mainly from wide areas but also for specialist central assignments; and late in his career he returned primarily to central midfield with Queens Park Rangers and PSV. Although Park was often characterized chiefly by his exceptional stamina and industry, those qualities enabled rather than fully explained his game. Park appeared wherever he was needed because he read the movement of the ball and changes in space, repeatedly moving into useful positions and creating numerical advantages. Rio Ferdinand similarly described Park as among the world's best off-the-ball movers, emphasizing the intelligence and directness of his runs.

Park's movement served both attack and defense: he pressed and recovered possession, covered for teammates, and then broke forward during transitions or made late runs into attacking positions. Park said that he continually considered where to move and pass and how to carry out his manager's tactical plan; Ferguson valued his habit of playing the ball and immediately repositioning himself to become involved again. Shooting was not one of Park's principal strengths. In a 2010 autobiographical self-assessment, he said that he lacked the singular elite attacking quality possessed by teammates such as Cristiano Ronaldo, Wayne Rooney, and Ryan Giggs, and that he instead sought to make more runs and open space for others. He worked to improve his finishing at United, and later said that advice from Ole Gunnar Solskjær on shooting and positioning had been substantially helpful.

At United, Ferguson used these attributes in opponent-specific roles, either as a narrow or defensive winger or as a marker of an influential player. Tactical writer Jonathan Wilson described Park as a "defensive winger" after he largely neutralized the attacking threat of Inter Milan full-back Maicon in 2009. Against AC Milan in 2010, Park followed Andrea Pirlo while United defended as part of a coordinated press, but retained freedom to join the attack and scored in the second leg. Pirlo later singled out Park as a player he could not get the better of, recalling the speed and persistence with which Park shadowed him. Park's suitability for such assignments contributed to his reputation as a big-game specialist: 15 of his 23 Champions League starts for United came in the knockout phase, where he was trusted for his energy, tactical discipline, and intelligent movement. Ferguson once claimed that he believed that Park was one of the few players in the world capable of marking Lionel Messi, and regretted not using that tactic in Manchester United's 2011 Champions League final defeat to Barcelona.

Fellow players emphasized the value of Park's selflessness and movement. Rooney later wrote that United's players regarded Park as almost as important to their success as Ronaldo, and that Park's individual quality was often overlooked because of the sacrifices he made for the team. Former Fulham full-back John Paintsil named Park as the opponent he had found most difficult to handle, recalling that tackles did not stop Park from returning to challenge him for possession. Mikel John Obi likewise recalled that Chelsea had to monitor Park continually because of his runs both with and without the ball.

Recurrent problems in Park's surgically repaired right knee both constrained and eventually reshaped his running-intensive game. Fatigue and long-distance travel could cause the joint to swell, making sufficient rest an important part of extending his career. Park later said that he believed the amount of running demanded by his role had made the knee less able to withstand the workload and was the principal reason for his retirement. Han linked Park's reduced mobility and chronic knee trouble to his late-career return to central midfield at QPR and PSV, where positioning and control of tempo became more important than sustained running from the flank.

== After retirement ==
=== Education and football administration ===
On 2 October 2014, Manchester United appointed Park a club ambassador, a role in which he represented the club at events and promoted its community and commercial work. In July 2015, the Asian Football Confederation (AFC) appointed him to its Social Responsibility Committee for the 2015–2019 term, his first formal appointment within a football governing body.

In September 2016, Park began the 17th edition of the FIFA Master, a year-long postgraduate program in sports management, law and the humanities taught at De Montfort University, SDA Bocconi and the University of Neuchâtel. Park said that, rather than automatically follow other former players into coaching or management, he wanted to learn about football "around the pitch" and potentially work in South Korean football. He graduated in July 2017. Later that month, he became the first South Korean appointed to the International Football Association Board's Football Advisory Panel, representing the AFC and advising on proposed changes to the Laws of the Game.

In November 2017, the Korea Football Association (KFA) named Park chief of its youth football strategy department, making him responsible for long-term youth-development plans and policy. Park said that his priority was to establish a system with a clear direction and to adapt lessons from European youth development to South Korean conditions. He played a leading role in recruiting German youth-development specialist Michael Müller, traveling to Germany in January 2018 to interview him before Müller joined the KFA as chief instructor and youth policy director. Park offered his resignation in December 2018 after thirteen months in the post; Yonhap reported that his overseas commitments had made it difficult for him to concentrate on the role.

In December 2021, Park undertook a placement with Queens Park Rangers' under-16 coaching staff as part of his UEFA B coaching-license training under technical director and head of coaching Chris Ramsey. Park said that the experience showed him how different coaching was from playing, while reiterating that his principal interest remained football administration.

In March 2023, the AFC appointed Park chair of its Professional Football Task Force for the 2023–2027 cycle, with responsibility for helping to develop and reform Asian club football. By February 2025, it was operating as the AFC Professional Football Committee, with Park continuing as chair; at its first meeting, the committee approved changes to club-competition entry rules concerning slot allocation, club licensing and competition integrity. In October 2025, FIFA appointed Park to its Men's Football Stakeholders Committee for the 2025–2029 term. In July 2026, he and Ryu Seung-min became co-chairs of the government-formed K-Football Innovation Committee, which was tasked with considering football governance, youth development and the use of new technology in South Korean football.

==== Jeonbuk Hyundai Motors ====
On 19 January 2021, Park joined Jeonbuk Hyundai Motors as a club adviser, his first position with a K League club. Working on a non-full-time basis while traveling between Britain and South Korea, he advised on the recruitment and development of senior and youth players, scouting, and training systems. Park said that the appointment meant he could no longer serve as a Manchester United ambassador. He concentrated particularly on the club's youth structure. During his first season, he reviewed academy training, proposed improvements, and advised on the development pathway as Jeonbuk prepared a B team composed primarily of under-23 players to enter the K4 League in 2022; he also personally contacted Paik Seung-ho to persuade him to join the club.

On 1 September 2022, Jeonbuk extended Park's contract and promoted him to technical director. The position gave him oversight of the squad, player evaluation and recruitment, coordination between the football staff and club management, and the direction of the youth program; he continued to divide his time between South Korea and England. Park led the search that resulted in the appointment of Dan Petrescu as head coach in June 2023. He also recommended FC Midtjylland to Cho Gue-sung, helping advance the forward's transfer to the Danish club in July 2023. That year, Park helped establish an academy-development partnership between Jeonbuk and his former club PSV Eindhoven. Six Jeonbuk under-15 players and a coach subsequently spent five weeks training in Eindhoven, where Park and Ruud van Nistelrooy visited the group.

Petrescu resigned in April 2024 after a poor start to the season. On 8 August, Jeonbuk appointed Michael Kim as technical director and moved Park into a club-adviser role focused on developing its international network and introducing European systems. Jeonbuk finished the 2024 K League 1 season in tenth place and retained its top-flight status through the relegation playoffs. At the end of the season, Yonhap reported that Park faced criticism over his involvement in recruitment and Petrescu's appointment, while also describing the club's decline as the product of structural and recruitment problems that had accumulated over several years. He remained a Jeonbuk adviser as of May 2026.

=== Broadcasting and media ===
In May 2018, SBS appointed Park as a commentator for the 2018 FIFA World Cup. Park said that he had received broadcasting offers for years and accepted because commentary would allow him to share his understanding of football with supporters. His wife, former SBS announcer Kim Min-ji, reviewed his rehearsals and advised him to state his conclusions directly rather than repeatedly qualifying them as what he "thought." Park made his live commentary debut alongside Bae Sung-jae during the tournament's opening match on 15 June. Although his delivery and repeated wording initially drew criticism, he adjusted in response to viewers; Yonhap subsequently reported praise for his explanations based on his overseas experience and his analysis of players' psychology. SBS's audience share ranked first among South Korea's three terrestrial broadcasters for the South Korea–Sweden and Japan–Colombia matches.

Park returned to SBS as a lead commentator for the 2022 FIFA World Cup, working with Bae and Jang Ji-hyun. The trio also covered men's football for SBS at the postponed 2022 Asian Games in Hangzhou the following year. For the 2026 FIFA World Cup, Park and Bae became JTBC's main commentary team, their third consecutive World Cup together.

Park has also held recurring roles in football-oriented television and streaming programs. He and Patrice Evra co-starred in two seasons of Man in Europe in 2024 and 2025, visiting South Korean players at European clubs, and beginning in 2024 served as general manager of FC Shooting Star in Coupang Play's football reality series FC Shooting Star, which assembled retired professionals to play against lower-division clubs.

== Legacy ==
Park is regarded as one of the greatest footballers in South Korean history. South Korean fans and media commonly group him with Cha Bum-kun and Son Heung-min as 차박손 (Cha–Park–Son), shorthand for a recurring debate over which of the three ranks as the country's greatest player.

Park's influence on South Korea's engagement with European club football is reflected in his common nickname 해버지 (haebeoji), a contraction of 해외 축구의 아버지 ("father of overseas football"). The name came into use after he became the first South Korean to play in the Premier League and his Manchester United matches drew late-night audiences in South Korea; Park said that he learned of it only later. The Korean Culture and Information Service has rendered the nickname as "father of Korean players overseas" and noted its use by supporters, players Park mentored, and younger footballers.

Park's club career also helped alter perceptions of South Korean players in Europe. Reuters wrote that his performances for PSV and Manchester United raised the profile of South Korean football worldwide, while Sportalkorea credited his success at United with challenging assumptions about Asian players and helping catalyze later Premier League moves by other South Koreans. SisaIN attributed the later concentration of South Korean players in England partly to the "star effect" created by Park and Son, but also to increasingly data-driven scouting and Korean agents' networks.

== Personal life ==
=== Family and relationships ===
Park is a Buddhist, having followed his parents' faith.

Park first met Kim Min-ji, then an announcer with SBS, in 2011 after her colleague Bae Sung-jae recommended her to Park's father, Park Sung-jong, who arranged the meeting. Park said that they initially remained friends before beginning a relationship in May 2013, which he publicly confirmed the following month. They married on 27 July in a private ceremony in Seoul, with Bae serving as master of ceremonies. They have a daughter, born in 2015, and a son, born in 2018. In 2023, Park described London as his home and said that he spent most of his free time with his family.

During his time at Manchester United, Park formed a particularly close friendship with Patrice Evra. Park later recalled that the two became neighbors in Alderley Edge and bonded over Pro Evolution Soccer, dinners, and pre-match warm-ups even though Park spoke no French, Evra spoke no Korean, and neither initially spoke English well. After Carlos Tevez joined United in 2007, he became part of their close circle. Evra, who spoke Spanish, translated between Park and Tevez, and the three regularly ate, traveled, and warmed up together. Park said that Evra and Tevez comforted him after he was omitted from United's squad for the 2008 UEFA Champions League final. Contemporary reporting described Park and Evra as Tevez's closest friends at United.

Park and Evra remained close after they left United. Evra attended Park's wedding in 2014, and in 2021 said that Park would be godfather to his son. In February 2026, Park and Evra traveled to Argentina to reunite with Tevez.

Late in 2017, Park's mother, Jang Myung-ja, was injured in a car accident in London. She died on 12 January 2018 while receiving treatment at a London hospital. Later that day, his paternal grandmother, Kim Mae-shim, died at a long-term-care hospital in Suwon. Evra traveled to Korea for Jang's funeral, saying that he too felt he had lost a mother because of the kindness and Korean meals she had shared with him during their years in Manchester.

=== Charity works ===
Park is the founder of the charitable foundation, JS Foundation, set up in 2011, which develop and launch charity programs that will support football infrastructure and also the necessaries of life. He is hosting the Suwon JS Cup, contested between South Korea and guest youth teams, for development of the Korean youth players since 2015.

He has participated in the Asian Dream Cup annual charity event with a team entitled "Park Ji-Sung and Friends". Fellow professionals who have played with him at the event include fellow South Korean internationals Ahn Jung-hwan and Lee Chung-yong, North Korean international Jong Tae-se and United teammate and former England captain Rio Ferdinand, while celebrities who have also done so include current cast members and alumni of the popular SBS variety show Running Man, including actor Song Joong-ki, singer Kim Jong-kook and rapper Gary. As a result, Park's involvement in the 2012 edition marked his first appearance on the show over three episodes.

=== Controversial chant ===
During his time with Manchester United, the chant for Park, "Park, Park wherever you may be," included the controversial lyrics generalizing and disparaging Koreans about eating dogs, which was deemed racist. Park, who originally did not know the chant's meaning, still later said he accepted the chant since it meant no harm. The chant, however, was later used on other South Korean players Ji So-yun and Hwang Hee-chan by Manchester United fans even after Park's retirement. When he participated in the anti-racism campaign of a South Korean YouTube channel in 2020, the South Korean fans criticized Park for tolerating and allowing the racist chant to be used continuously on other South Korean players. Park accepted the criticism and appealed to the United fans to stop singing his chant on behalf of Korean players and fans.

== Career statistics ==
=== Club ===
Appearances and goals by club, season and competition
Club	Season	League			National cup (Note: Includes Emperor's Cup, KNVB Cup, FA Cup)		League cup (Note: Includes J.League Cup, Football League Cup)		Continental		Other		Total	
Club	Season	Division	Apps	Goals	Apps	Goals	Apps	Goals	Apps	Goals	Apps	Goals	Apps	Goals
Kyoto Purple Sanga	2000	J1 League	13	1	1	0	2	0	—		—		16	1
Kyoto Purple Sanga	2001	J2 League	38	3	1	0	1	0	—		—		40	3
Kyoto Purple Sanga	2002	J1 League	25	7	4	1	0	0	—		—		29	8
Kyoto Purple Sanga	Total		76	11	6	1	3	0	—		—		85	12
PSV Eindhoven	2002–03	Eredivisie	8	0	0	0	—		—		—		8	0
PSV Eindhoven	2003–04	Eredivisie	28	6	1	0	—		10 (Note: Five appearances in UEFA Champions League, five appearances in UEFA Cup)	0	1 (Note: Appearance in Johan Cruyff Shield)	0	40	6
PSV Eindhoven	2004–05	Eredivisie	28	7	3	2	—		13 (Note: Appearances in UEFA Champions League)	2	—		44	11
PSV Eindhoven	Total		65	13	4	2	—		23	2	1	0	92	17
Manchester United	2005–06	Premier League	34	1	2	0	3	1	6	0	—		45	2
Manchester United	2006–07	Premier League	14	5	5	0	0	0	1	0	—		20	5
Manchester United	2007–08	Premier League	12	1	2	0	0	0	4	0	0	0	18	1
Manchester United	2008–09	Premier League	25	2	3	1	1	0	9	1	2 (Note: One appearance in UEFA Super Cup, one appearance in FIFA Club World Cup)	0	40	4
Manchester United	2009–10	Premier League	17	3	0	0	2	0	6	1	1 (Note: Appearance in FA Community Shield)	0	26	4
Manchester United	2010–11	Premier League	15	5	1	0	2	2	9	1	1	0	28	8
Manchester United	2011–12	Premier League	17	2	1	1	3	0	7 (Note: Four appearances in UEFA Champions League, three appearances in UEFA Europa League)	0	0	0	28	3
Manchester United	Total		134	19	14	2	11	3	42	3	4	0	205	27
Queens Park Rangers	2012–13	Premier League	20	0	3	0	2	0	—		—		25	0
PSV Eindhoven (loan)	2013–14	Eredivisie	23	2	0	0	—		4 (Note: Two appearances in UEFA Champions League, tho appearances in UEFA Europa League)	0	—		27	2
Career total			318	45	27	5	16	3	69	5	5	0	434	58

=== International ===
Appearances and goals by national team and year
National team	Year	Apps	Goals
South Korea	2000	15	1
South Korea	2001	10	0
South Korea	2002	15	3
South Korea	2003	1	0
South Korea	2004	8	0
South Korea	2005	8	1
South Korea	2006	8	1
South Korea	2007	2	0
South Korea	2008	7	3
South Korea	2009	10	2
South Korea	2010	11	2
South Korea	2011	5	0
Career total		100	13

Appearances and goals by competition
Competition	Apps	Goals
Friendlies	34	4
Minor competitions	9	0
CONCACAF Gold Cup	3	0
AFC Asian Cup qualification	5	0
AFC Asian Cup	13	0
FIFA Confederations Cup	3	0
FIFA World Cup qualification	19	6
FIFA World Cup	14	3
Total	100	13

List of international goals scored by Park Ji-sung
No.	Date	Venue	Cap	Opponent	Score	Result	Competition
1	7 June 2000	Tehran, Iran	6	Macedonia	2–0	2–1	Friendly
2	21 May 2002	Seogwipo, South Korea	32	England	1–1	1–1	Friendly
3	26 May 2002	Suwon, South Korea	33	France	1–1	2–3	Friendly
4	14 June 2002	Incheon, South Korea	36	Portugal	1–0	1–0	2002 FIFA World Cup
5	8 June 2005	Kuwait City, Kuwait	54	Kuwait	4–0	4–0	2006 FIFA World Cup qualification
6	18 June 2006	Leipzig, Germany	61	France	1–1	1–1	2006 FIFA World Cup
7	6 February 2008	Seoul, South Korea	68	Turkmenistan	3–0	4–0	2010 FIFA World Cup qualification
8	31 May 2008	Seoul, South Korea	70	Jordan	1–0	2–2	2010 FIFA World Cup qualification
9	15 October 2008	Seoul, South Korea	73	United Arab Emirates	2–0	4–1	2010 FIFA World Cup qualification
10	11 February 2009	Tehran, Iran	75	Iran	1–1	1–1	2010 FIFA World Cup qualification
11	17 June 2009	Seoul, South Korea	80	Iran	1–1	1–1	2010 FIFA World Cup qualification
12	24 May 2010	Saitama, Japan	87	Japan	1–0	2–0	Friendly
13	12 June 2010	Port Elizabeth, South Africa	89	Greece	2–0	2–0	2010 FIFA World Cup

== Honours ==
Kyoto Purple Sanga

- J2 League: 2001
- Emperor's Cup: 2002

PSV Eindhoven

- Eredivisie: 2002–03, 2004–05
- KNVB Cup: 2004–05
- Johan Cruyff Shield: 2003

Manchester United

- Premier League: 2006–07, 2007–08, 2008–09, 2010–11
- Football League Cup: 2005–06, 2008–09, 2009–10
- FA Community Shield: 2010, 2011
- UEFA Champions League: 2007–08
- FIFA Club World Cup: 2008

South Korea U23

- Asian Games bronze medal: 2002

South Korea

- AFC Asian Cup third place: 2000, 2011

Individual

- FIFA World Cup Fans' All-Star Team: 2002
- AFC Asian Cup Quality Player: 2011
- AFC Best Player of All Time at the FIFA World Cup: 2020
- AFC Opta All-time XI at the FIFA World Cup: 2020
- AFC Fans' All-time XI at the FIFA World Cup: 2020
- AFC Asian Cup All-time XI: 2023
- IFFHS Asian Men's Team of All Time: 2021
- J.League All-Star: 2002
- Korean FA Goal of the Year: 2002, 2010
- Korean FA Player of the Year: 2010
- Korean FA Fans' Player of the Year: 2010
- Gallup Korea's Athlete of the Year: 2011
- K League All-Star Game Most Valuable Player: 2014
- MLS All-Star Game Most Valuable Player: 2011

== See also ==
- List of men's footballers with 100 or more international caps
