= Gallup Korea's Athlete of the Year =

Gallup Korea's Athlete of the Year (Korean: 한국갤럽조사연구소 올해를 빛낸 스포츠선수) is a South Korean athlete considered the greatest contributor for a year to enhancing South Korea's national prestige by participants in an opinion poll of Gallup Korea. The annual poll was started in 2007. Its statistics are based on about 1,700 answers, and each of voters can choose two athletes.

== Winners ==
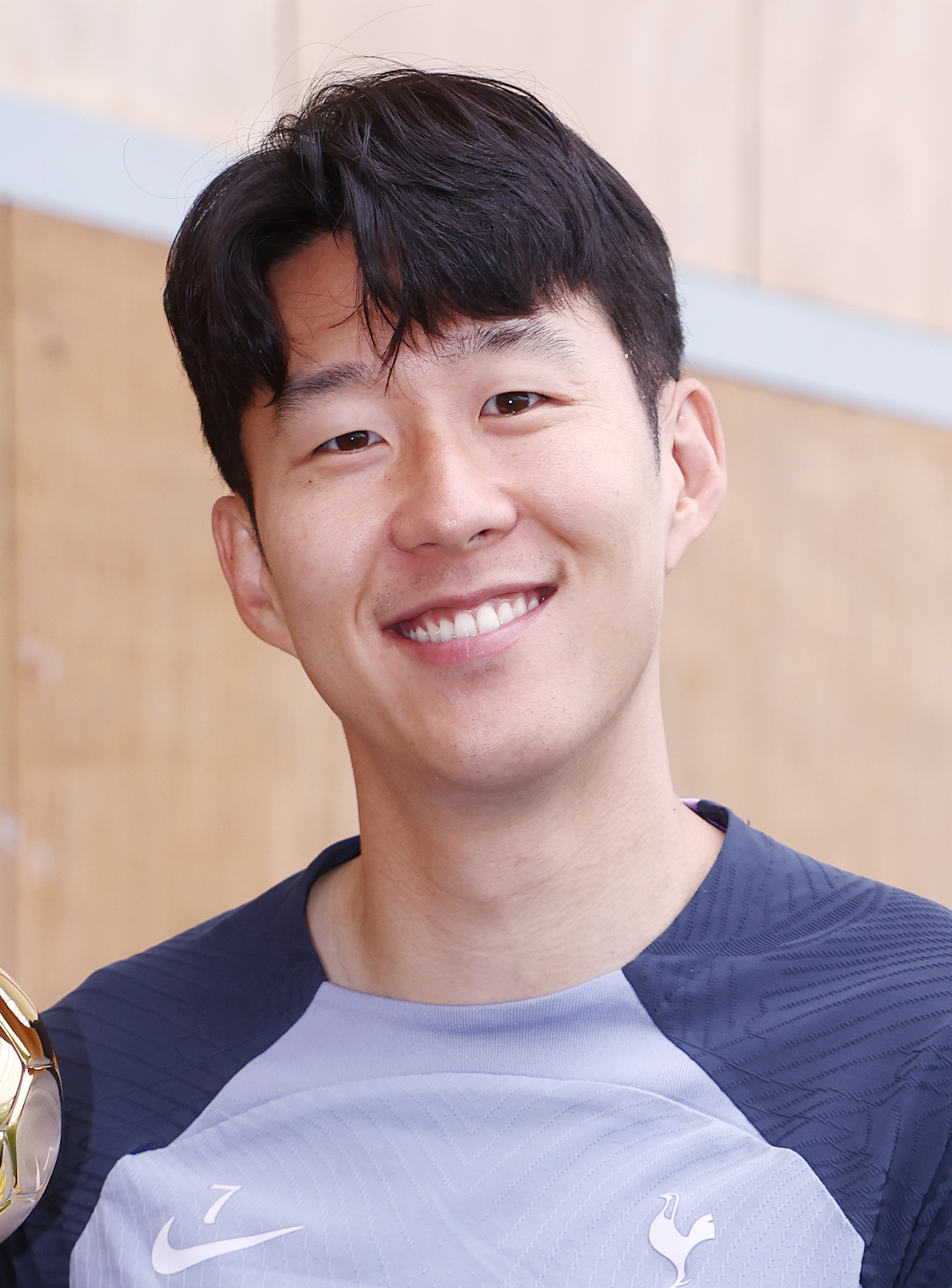
Son Heung-min is a ten-time winner of the poll.

Year	Athlete	Gender	Sport	Ratio	Ref.
2007	Kim Yuna	Woman	Figure skating	52.0%	
2008	Kim Yuna (2)	Woman	Figure skating	56.1%	
2009	Kim Yuna (3)	Woman	Figure skating	82.8%	
2010	Park Tae-hwan	Man	Swimming	61.6%	
2011	Park Ji-sung	Man	Football	57.6%	
2012	Son Yeon-jae	Woman	Gymnastics	37.6%	
2013	Ryu Hyun-jin	Man	Baseball	51.4%	
2014	Son Yeon-jae (2)	Woman	Gymnastics	42.0%	
2015	Son Heung-min	Man	Football	24.4%	
2016	Son Yeon-jae (3)	Woman	Gymnastics	29.8%	
2017	Son Heung-min (2)	Man	Football	38.1%	
2018	Son Heung-min (3)	Man	Football	63.3%	
2019	Son Heung-min (4)	Man	Football	82.0%	
2020	Son Heung-min (5)	Man	Football	79.7%	
2021	Son Heung-min (6)	Man	Football	72.8%	
2022	Son Heung-min (7)	Man	Football	86.2%	
2023	Son Heung-min (8)	Man	Football	73.8%	
2024	Son Heung-min (9)	Man	Football	70.7%	
2025	Son Heung-min (10)	Man	Football	76.1%	

== Results ==
=== 2007 ===
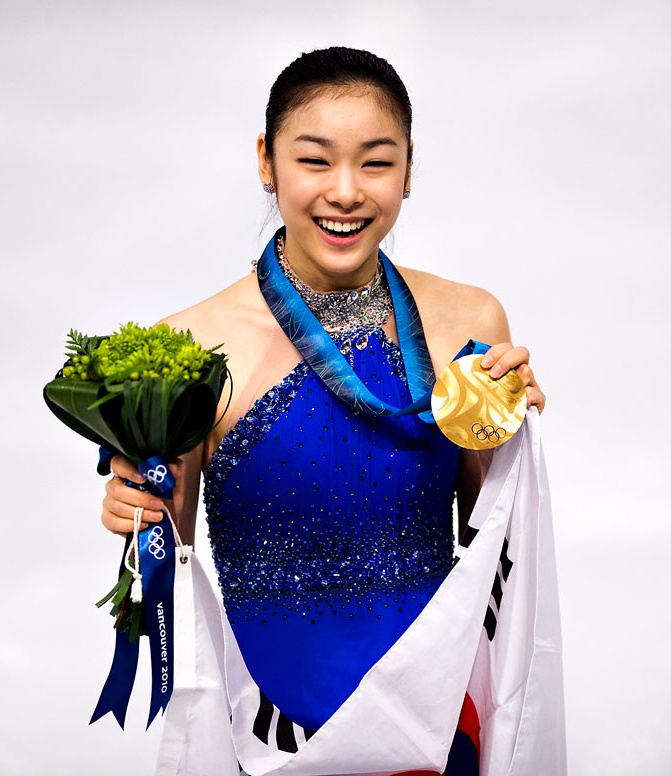
Kim Yuna is a three-time winner of the poll.

Rank	Athlete	Gender	Sport	Ratio
1	Kim Yuna	Woman	Figure skating	52.0%
2	Park Tae-hwan	Man	Swimming	45.4%
3	Park Ji-sung	Man	Football	28.0%
4	Lee Seung-yuop	Man	Baseball	11.8%
5	Choi Kyung-ju	Man	Golf	5.2%
6	Pak Se-ri	Woman	Golf	4.3%
7	Park Chan-ho	Man	Baseball	2.7%
8	Lee Young-pyo	Man	Football	1.4%
9	Lee Chun-soo	Man	Football	0.7%
10	Yang Joon-hyuk	Man	Baseball	0.5%

=== 2008 ===
Rank	Athlete	Gender	Sport	Ratio
1	Kim Yuna	Woman	Figure skating	56.1%
2	Park Tae-hwan	Man	Swimming	55.4%
3	Park Ji-sung	Man	Football	23.9%
4	Jang Mi-ran	Woman	Weightlifting	21.8%
5	Lee Seung-yuop	Man	Baseball	11.5%
6	Choi Min-ho	Man	Judo	2.5%
7	Lee Yong-dae	Man	Badminton	2.3%
8	Shin Jiyai	Woman	Golf	2.1%
9	Park Chan-ho	Man	Baseball	2.0%
10	Pak Se-ri	Woman	Golf	1.3%

=== 2009 ===
Rank	Athlete	Gender	Sport	Ratio
1	Kim Yuna	Woman	Figure skating	82.8%
2	Park Ji-sung	Man	Football	40.7%
3	Park Tae-hwan	Man	Swimming	14.5%
4	Choo Shin-soo	Man	Baseball	10.9%
5	Park Chan-ho	Man	Baseball	9.6%
6	Shin Jiyai	Woman	Golf	6.4%
7	Lee Seung-yuop	Man	Baseball	4.3%
8	Lee Chung-yong	Man	Football	1.7%
9	Kim Tae-kyun	Man	Baseball	1.5%
10	Pak Se-ri	Woman	Golf	1.4%

=== 2010 ===
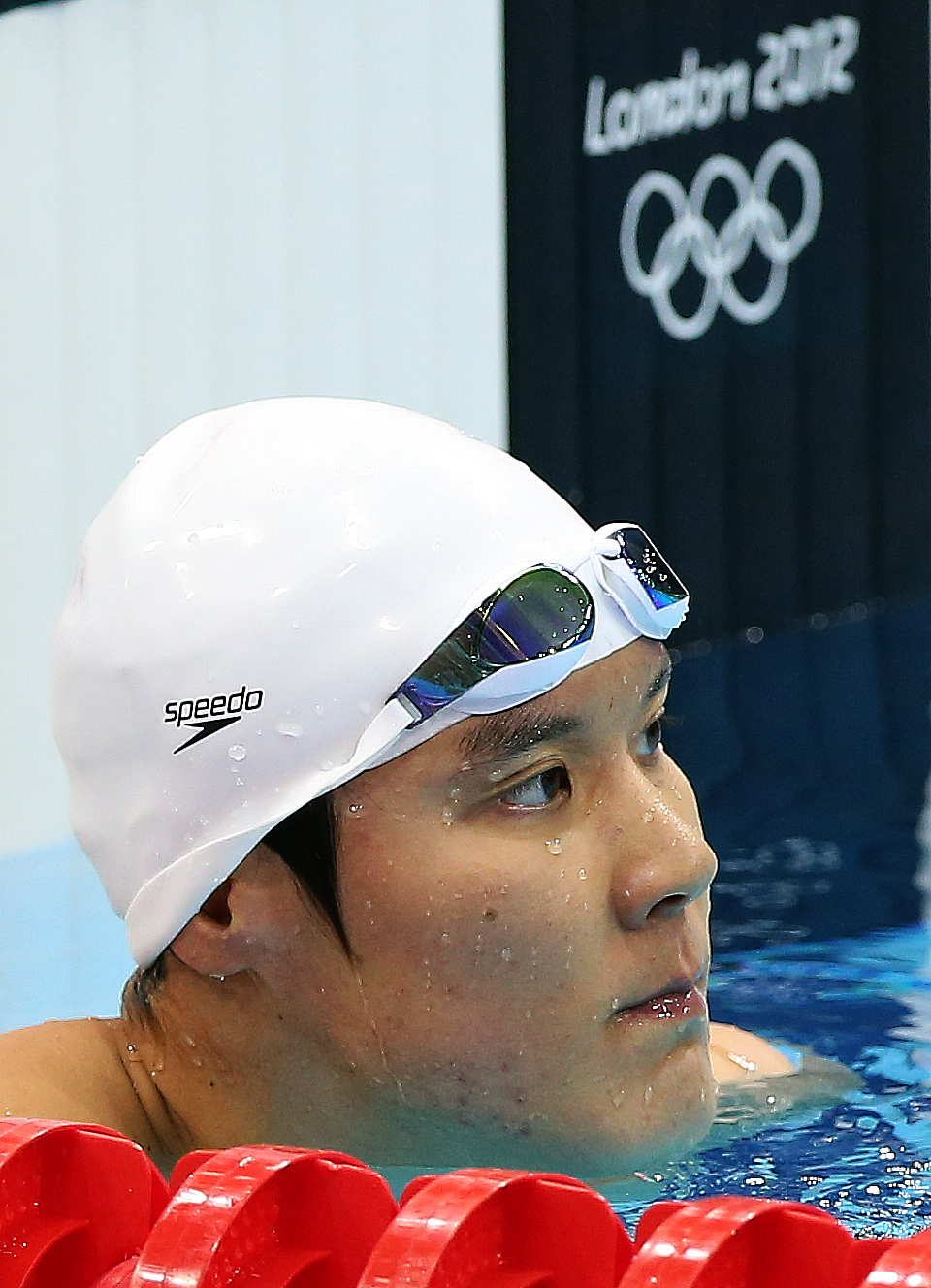
Park Tae-hwan is the first swimmer to win the poll.

Rank	Athlete	Gender	Sport	Ratio
1	Park Tae-hwan	Man	Swimming	61.6%
2	Kim Yuna	Woman	Figure skating	50.0%
3	Park Ji-sung	Man	Football	35.6%
4	Choo Shin-soo	Man	Baseball	16.2%
5	Jang Mi-ran	Woman	Weightlifting	7.7%
6	Park Chan-ho	Man	Baseball	3.6%
7	Lee Chung-yong	Man	Football	3.0%
8	Park Chu-young	Man	Football	2.7%
9	Jeong Da-rae	Woman	Swimming	2.2%
10	Lee Dae-ho	Man	Baseball	1.4%

=== 2011 ===
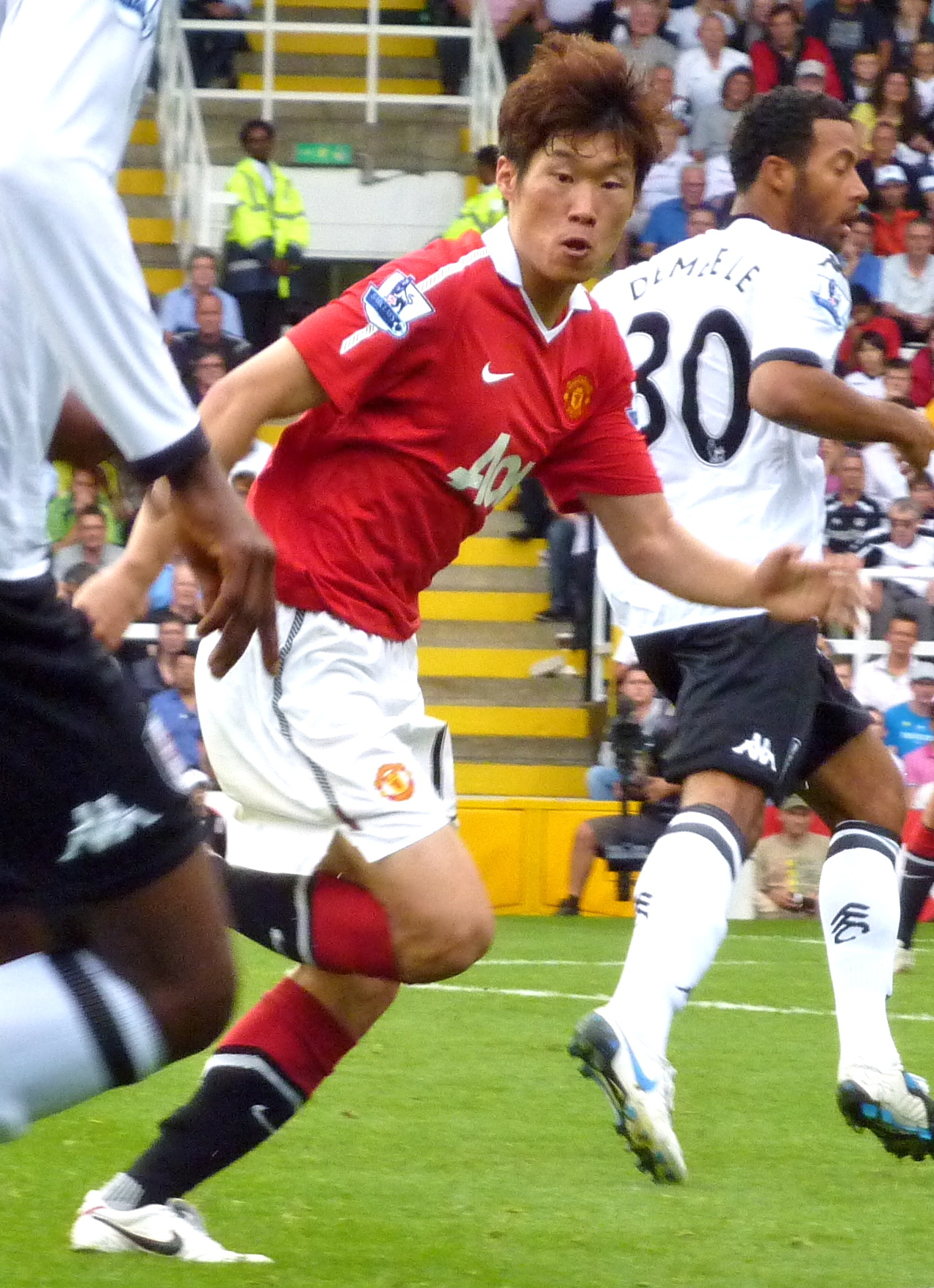
Park Ji-sung is the first footballer to win the poll.

Rank	Athlete	Gender	Sport	Ratio
1	Park Ji-sung	Man	Football	57.6%
2	Kim Yuna	Woman	Figure skating	55.9%
3	Park Tae-hwan	Man	Swimming	26.0%
4	Lee Dae-ho	Man	Baseball	6.5%
5	Park Chu-young	Man	Football	5.4%
6	Park Chan-ho	Man	Baseball	5.0%
7	Choo Shin-soo	Man	Baseball	3.2%
8	Lee Seung-yuop	Man	Baseball	2.3%
9	Choi Kyung-ju	Man	Golf	2.2%
10	Ki Sung-yueng	Man	Football	1.9%

=== 2012 ===
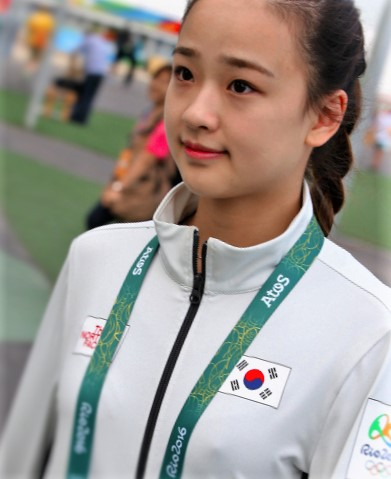
Son Yeon-jae is a three-time winner of the poll.

Rank	Athlete	Gender	Sport	Ratio
1	Son Yeon-jae	Woman	Gymnastics	37.2%
2	Park Tae-hwan	Man	Swimming	29.1%
3	Park Ji-sung	Man	Football	23.7%
4	Kim Yuna	Woman	Figure skating	23.0%
5	Yang Hak-seon	Man	Gymnastics	16.3%
6	Ki Sung-yueng	Man	Football	6.1%
7	Choo Shin-soo	Man	Baseball	5.1%
8	Ryu Hyun-jin	Man	Baseball	4.3%
9	Park Chan-ho	Man	Baseball	3.8%
10	Lee Dae-ho	Man	Baseball	3.8%

=== 2013 ===
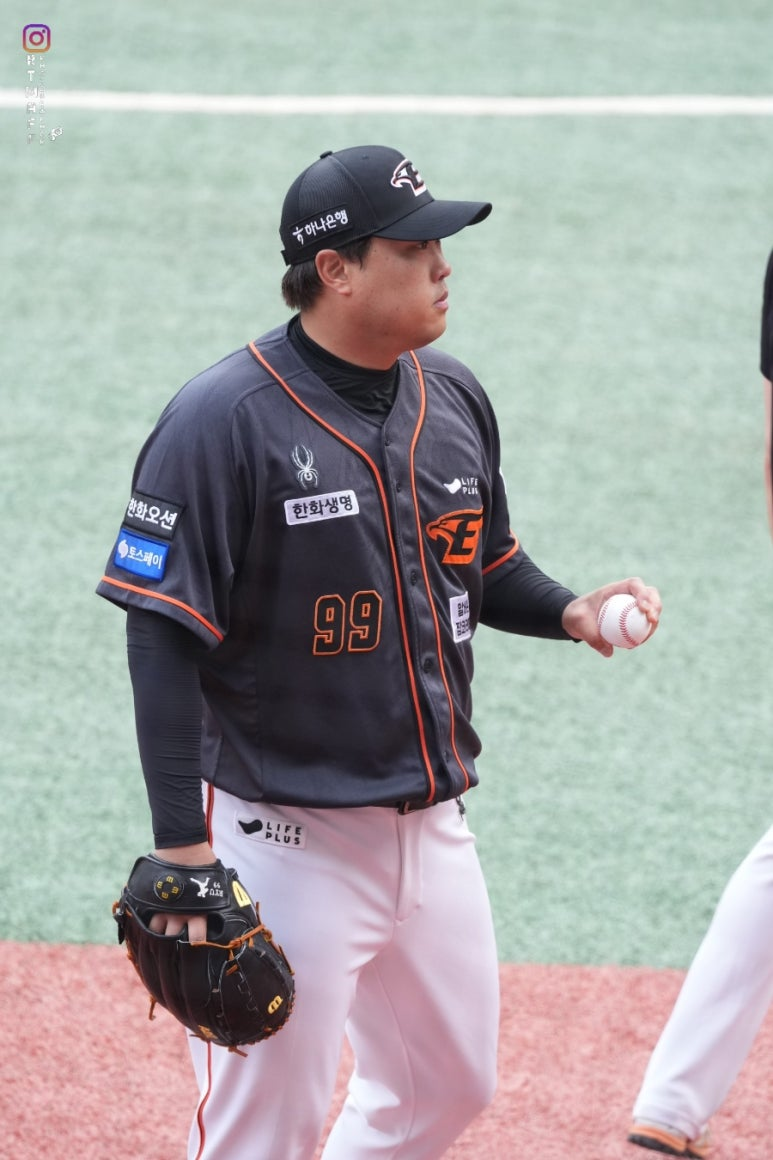
Ryu Hyun-jin is the first Baseball player to win the poll.

Rank	Athlete	Gender	Sport	Ratio
1	Ryu Hyun-jin	Man	Baseball	51.4%
2	Kim Yuna	Woman	Figure skating	35.2%
3	Son Yeon-jae	Woman	Gymnastics	24.9%
4	Park Ji-sung	Man	Football	18.8%
5	Choo Shin-soo	Man	Baseball	17.0%
6	Park Tae-hwan	Man	Swimming	5.9%
7	Lee Dae-ho	Man	Baseball	4.7%
8	Son Heung-min	Man	Football	4.5%
9	Ki Sung-yueng	Man	Football	3.1%
10	Lee Seung-yuop	Man	Baseball	1.9%

=== 2014 ===
Rank	Athlete	Gender	Sport	Ratio
1	Son Yeon-jae	Woman	Gymnastics	42.0%
2	Kim Yuna	Woman	Figure skating	33.3%
3	Ryu Hyun-jin	Man	Baseball	29.1%
4	Park Tae-hwan	Man	Swimming	24.5%
5	Son Heung-min	Man	Football	12.9%
6	Choo Shin-soo	Man	Baseball	5.5%
7	Lee Dae-ho	Man	Baseball	3.7%
8	Ki Sung-yueng	Man	Football	3.1%
9	Lee Sang-hwa	Woman	Speed skating	2.8%
10	Lee Seung-yuop	Man	Baseball	2.7%

=== 2015 ===
Rank	Athlete	Gender	Sport	Ratio
1	Son Heung-min	Man	Football	24.4%
2	Son Yeon-jae	Woman	Gymnastics	17.5%
3	Choo Shin-soo	Man	Baseball	16.9%
4	Kim Yuna	Woman	Figure skating	15.1%
5	Ki Sung-yueng	Man	Football	13.1%
6	Ryu Hyun-jin	Man	Baseball	11.8%
7	Kang Jung-ho	Man	Baseball	9.8%
8	Park Ji-sung	Man	Football	8.9%
9	Lee Dae-ho	Man	Baseball	8.6%
10	Park Inbee	Woman	Golf	7.0%

=== 2016 ===
Rank	Athlete	Gender	Sport	Ratio
1	Son Yeon-jae	Woman	Gymnastics	29.8%
2	Son Heung-min	Man	Football	27.3%
3	Park Inbee	Woman	Golf	16.6%
4	Kim Yuna	Woman	Figure skating	14.5%
5	Park Sang-young	Man	Fencing	8.8%
6	Ki Sung-yueng	Man	Football	7.2%
7	Lee Dae-ho	Man	Baseball	6.0%
8	Kim Yeon-koung	Woman	Volleyball	5.7%
9	Park Ji-sung	Man	Football	5.6%
10	Choo Shin-soo	Man	Baseball	4.4%

=== 2017 ===
Rank	Athlete	Gender	Sport	Ratio
1	Son Heung-min	Man	Football	38.1%
2	Kim Yuna	Woman	Figure skating	13.4%
3	Ryu Hyun-jin	Man	Baseball	12.8%
4	Ki Sung-yueng	Man	Football	10.7%
5	Choo Shin-soo	Man	Baseball	9.4%
6	Lee Seung-yuop	Man	Baseball	8.8%
7	Lee Dae-ho	Man	Baseball	8.0%
8	Park Ji-sung	Man	Football	6.8%
9	Lee Dong-gook	Man	Football	6.2%
10	Yang Hyeon-jong	Man	Baseball	5.3%

=== 2018 ===
Rank	Athlete	Gender	Sport	Ratio
1	Son Heung-min	Man	Football	63.3%
2	Ryu Hyun-jin	Man	Baseball	19.2%
3	Jo Hyeon-woo	Man	Football	8.8%
4	Hwang Ui-jo	Man	Football	8.4%
5	Kim Eun-jung	Woman	Curling	7.9%
6	Lee Seung-woo	Man	Football	7.8%
7	Ki Sung-yueng	Man	Football	6.7%
8	Choo Shin-soo	Man	Baseball	5.8%
9	Kim Yuna	Woman	Figure skating	4.1%
10	Lee Dae-ho	Man	Baseball	4.0%

=== 2019 ===
Rank	Athlete	Gender	Sport	Ratio
1	Son Heung-min	Man	Football	82.0%
2	Ryu Hyun-jin	Man	Baseball	38.7%
3	Lee Kang-in	Man	Football	13.6%
4	Choo Shin-soo	Man	Baseball	4.7%
5	Kim Yuna	Woman	Figure skating	3.9%
5	Ki Sung-yueng	Man	Football	3.9%
7	Park Ji-sung	Man	Football	3.2%
8	Park Chan-ho	Man	Football	1.5%
8	Jo Hyeon-woo	Man	Football	1.5%
8	Lee Dae-ho	Man	Baseball	1.5%

=== 2020 ===
Rank	Athlete	Gender	Sport	Ratio
1	Son Heung-min	Man	Football	79.7%
2	Ryu Hyun-jin	Man	Baseball	24.3%
3	Choo Shin-soo	Man	Baseball	6.7%
4	Kim Yeon-koung	Woman	Volleyball	6.0%
5	Lee Kang-in	Man	Football	4.8%
6	Lee Dong-gook	Man	Football	4.0%
7	Kim Yuna	Woman	Figure skating	3.6%
8	Park Ji-sung	Man	Football	2.6%
9	Lee Dae-ho	Man	Baseball	2.4%
10	Ki Sung-yueng	Man	Football	2.1%

=== 2021 ===
Rank	Athlete	Gender	Sport	Ratio
1	Son Heung-min	Man	Football	72.8%
2	Kim Yeon-koung	Woman	Volleyball	29.4%
3	An San	Woman	Archery	10.4%
4	Ryu Hyun-jin	Man	Baseball	9.1%
5	Kim Je-deok	Man	Archery	4.1%
6	Choo Shin-soo	Man	Baseball	3.4%
7	Lee Kang-in	Man	Football	3.1%
8	Park Ji-sung	Man	Football	2.8%
9	Kim Hee-jin	Woman	Volleyball	1.6%
10	Ko Jin-young	Woman	Golf	1.4%
10	Hwang Hee-chan	Man	Football	1.4%

=== 2022 ===
Rank	Athlete	Gender	Sport	Ratio
1	Son Heung-min	Man	Football	86.2%
2	Kim Yeon-koung	Woman	Volleyball	9.9%
3	Ryu Hyun-jin	Man	Baseball	6.4%
4	Lee Kang-in	Man	Football	5.1%
5	Kim Min-jae	Man	Football	4.8%
6	Choo Shin-soo	Man	Baseball	3.1%
7	Lee Dae-ho	Man	Baseball	2.9%
7	Hwang Hee-chan	Man	Football	2.9%
9	Kim Yuna	Woman	Figure skating	2.2%
10	Lee Jung-hoo	Man	Baseball	1.9%
10	Kim Ha-seong	Man	Baseball	1.9%

=== 2023 ===
Rank	Athlete	Gender	Sport	Ratio
1	Son Heung-min	Man	Football	73.8%
2	Lee Kang-in	Man	Football	27.7%
3	Kim Min-jae	Man	Football	8.1%
4	Hwang Hee-chan	Man	Football	4.8%
5	An Se-young	Woman	Badminton	4.1%
6	Ryu Hyun-jin	Man	Baseball	3.9%
7	Kim Yeon-koung	Woman	Volleyball	3.7%
8	Shin Yu-bin	Woman	Table tennis	3.2%
9	Kim Ha-seong	Man	Baseball	2.4%
10	Woo Sang-hyeok	Man	Athletics	2.0%

=== 2024 ===
Rank	Athlete	Gender	Sport	Ratio
1	Son Heung-min	Man	Football	70.7%
2	Lee Kang-in	Man	Football	12.7%
3	Shin Yu-bin	Woman	Table tennis	10.4%
4	An Se-young	Woman	Badminton	8.2%
5	Oh Sang-uk	Man	Fencing	8.0%
6	Kim Min-jae	Man	Football	6.9%
7	Kim Ye-ji	Woman	Shooting sports	5.3%
8	Kim Woo-jin	Man	Archery	5.2%
9	Hwang Hee-chan	Man	Football	2.9%
10	Kim Yeon-koung	Woman	Volleyball	2.5%

=== 2025 ===
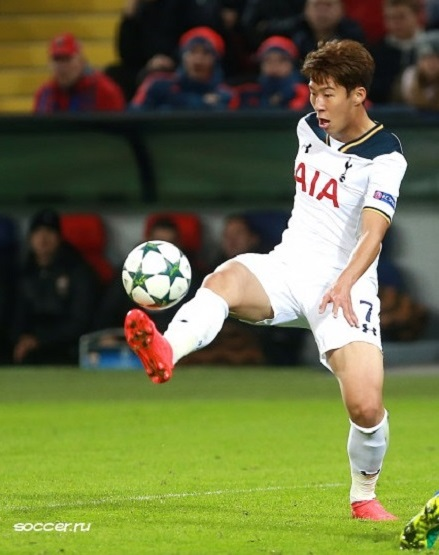
Son Heung-min won the poll nine consecutive times.

Rank	Athlete	Gender	Sport	Ratio
1	Son Heung-min	Man	Football	76.1%
2	Lee Kang-in	Man	Football	16.0%
3	An Se-young	Woman	Badminton	12.2%
4	Kim Min-jae	Man	Football	7.3%
5	Kim Yeon-koung	Woman	Volleyball	6.3%
6	Lee Jung-hoo	Man	Baseball	6.0%
7	Ryu Hyun-jin	Man	Baseball	4.7%
8	Shin Yu-bin	Woman	Table tennis	2.9%
9	Kim Ha-seong	Man	Baseball	2.6%
10	Hwang Hee-chan	Man	Football	2.5%

== See also ==
- Korean Sports Hall of Fame
