= Jordi Hoogstrate =

Dutch footballer

Personal information
- Date of birth: 2 June 1983 (age 43)
- Place of birth: Groningen, Netherlands
- Height: 1.76 m (5 ft 9 in)
- Position: Midfielder

Youth career
- –1995: VV Annen
- 1995–1996: LTC Assen

Senior career*
| Years | Team | Apps | (Gls) |
| 2001–2003 | Groningen | 42 | (2) |
| 2003–2008 | PSV | 5 | (0) |
| 2005–2007 | → Emmen (loan) | 6 | (0) |
| 2008–2009 | Groningen | 0 | (0) |
| Total | | 53 | (2) |

International career
| 2001 | Netherlands U18 | 2 | (0) |
| 2001–2002 | Netherlands U19 | 11 | (1) |
| 2002–2004 | Netherlands U21 | 5 | (1) |
- * Club domestic league appearances and goals

Jordi Hoogstrate (born 2 June 1983) is a Dutch retired footballer who played as a midfielder.

== Career ==
Hailing from Annen in Drenthe, Hoogstrate played for local sides VV Annen and LTC Assen and started his professional career in 2001 with FC Groningen. A hugely talented midfielder, he followed his former teammate Arjen Robben on a €3 million transfer to PSV summer 2003. At PSV Hoogstrate suffered with serious knee injuries. He only played five matches for PSV. He was on loan at FC Emmen for two periods but suffered again with knee injuries. In 2008, when his contract in Eindhoven was expired, he rejoined FC Groningen and would start in the reserve squad. In July, in a match with Jong FC Groningen, he got seriously injured on his knee once again. He ended his career in March 2009 and started to coach in the FC Groningen youth academy.

Hoogstrate also played for the Netherlands Under 21 and U19s.

== Honours ==
- Eredivisie: 2005, 2008
- KNVB Cup: 2005
- Johan Cruijff Shield: 2003
