= Leandro Bonfim =

Brazilian footballer

Personal information
- Date of birth: January 8, 1984 (age 42)
- Place of birth: Salvador, Brazil
- Height: 1.74 m (5 ft 9 in)
- Position: Attacking midfielder

Youth career
- 1997–2001: EC Vitória

Senior career*
Years	Team	Apps	(Gls)
2001–2002	Vitória	1	(0)
2002–2005	PSV Eindhoven	18	(1)
2005–2007	Porto	7	(0)
2005	→ São Paulo (loan)	13	(0)
2006	→ Cruzeiro (loan)	14	(0)
2006–2007	CD Nacional	12	(1)
2007–2008	Vasco da Gama	23	(2)
2009	Fluminense	1	(0)
2010	Desportivo Brasil		
2010	→ Bahia (loan)	3	(0)
2010	→ Avaí (loan)	7	(0)
2013	Audax Rio	0	(0)
2013–2014	Al-Ittihad	15	(3)
2014–2015	Al-Wehda	9	(0)
- * Club domestic league appearances and goals

Leandro do Bonfim (born January 8, 1984, in Salvador), is a Brazilian former professional who played as an attacking midfielder.

== Honours ==
- Dutch League: 2003
- Dutch Super Cup: 2003
- Copa Libertadores: 2005
- Minas Gerais State League: 2006
