= Jan Vennegoor of Hesselink =

Dutch footballer (born 1978)

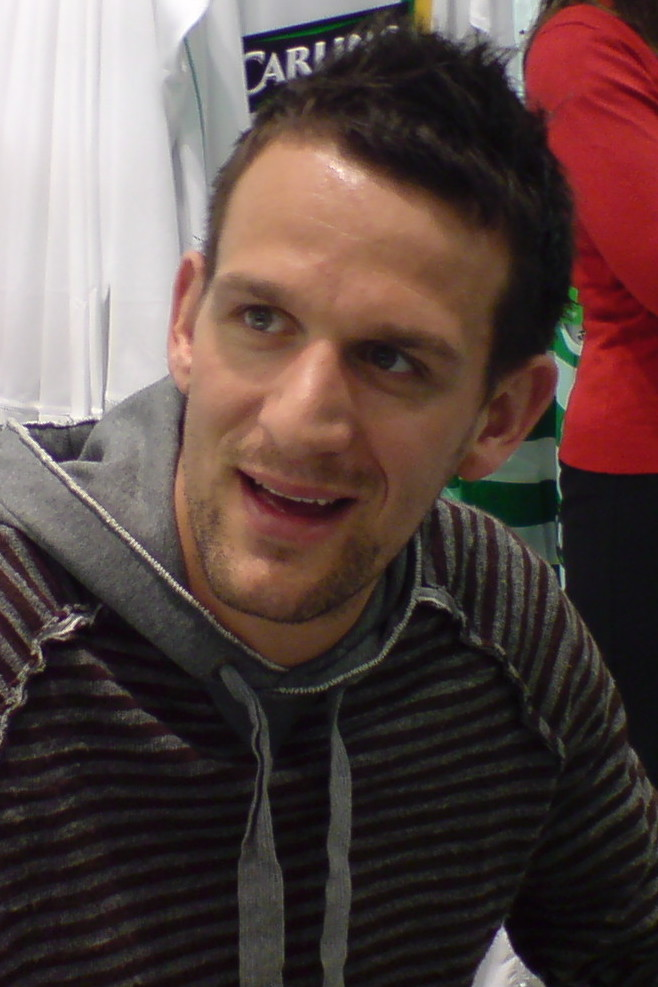
- Vennegoor of Hesselink at a Celtic event in 2006

Personal information
- Full name: Johannes Vennegoor of Hesselink
- Date of birth: 7 November 1978 (age 47)
- Place of birth: Oldenzaal, Netherlands
- Height: 6 ft 3 in (1.91 m)
- Position: Striker

Senior career*
Years	Team	Apps	(Gls)
1996–2001	Twente	142	(59)
2001–2006	PSV	157	(73)
2006–2009	Celtic	78	(34)
2009–2010	Hull City	31	(3)
2010–2011	Rapid Wien	10	(2)
2011–2012	PSV	17	(2)
Total		435	(173)

International career
2000–2009	Netherlands	19	(3)
- * Club domestic league appearances and goals

Johannes "Jan" Vennegoor of Hesselink (Dutch pronunciation: [joːˈɦɑnəs ˈfɛnəɣoːr ɔf ˈɦɛsəlɪŋk, jɑɱ ˈvɛn-]; born 7 November 1978) is a Dutch former professional footballer who played as a striker.

Vennegoor of Hesselink played in the Eredivisie for Twente and PSV, in the Scottish Premier League for Celtic, in the Premier League for Hull City, in the Austrian Football Bundesliga for Rapid Wien and the Netherlands national team.

Vennegoor of Hesselink earned 19 caps for the Netherlands national team between 2000 and 2009, scoring three goals. He was selected for the 2006 FIFA World Cup and UEFA Euro 2008.

== Name ==
British newspaper The Guardian researched Vennegoor of Hesselink's unusual-sounding name in 2004. It found that in the 17th century, there was a marriage between the Vennegoor and Hesselink farming families of Enschede, and due to the prestige of both surnames, they kept both. The 'of' in his name means 'or' in Dutch.

== Club career ==
=== Twente and PSV ===
Born in Oldenzaal, Vennegoor of Hesselink scored 59 league goals for Twente over the course of five seasons. In 2001, he was signed by Eredivisie rivals PSV. Vennegoor of Hesselink scored 22 times for PSV during his first season with the club. His second and third seasons at PSV proved less fruitful, with eight and twelve goals, respectively. At the end of the 2003–04 season, he was told he could leave the club, but stayed on and scored 19 goals in 28 matches during the 2004–05 season.

=== Celtic ===
==== 2006–07 ====
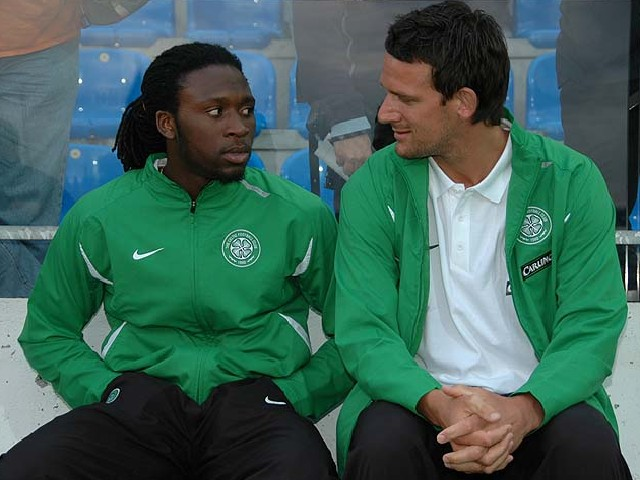
Vennegoor of Hesselink with fellow Dutchman Evander Sno at Celtic.

On 24 August 2006, Vennegoor of Hesselink left PSV and signed a three-year deal with Scottish Premier League champions Celtic, with the option of a further year, for a fee of around £3.4 million. He made his debut on 26 August against Hibernian and scored the winning goal after coming on as a substitute. In his next game against Aberdeen on 9 September, he scored the winner from outside the box in a 1–0 win. He then scored his first European goal for Celtic in the UEFA Champions League against Manchester United four days later, scoring the opening goal as United won 3–2. Injuries subsequently curtailed his appearances but he found his form late on, scoring his first hat-trick for the Bhoys against St Mirren on 20 January 2007 and a last minute winner against Inverness the following week, before being sent off with a second yellow card after leaving the field of play to celebrate with the Celtic fans. He ended the season with 18 goals to his name and SPL and Scottish Cup winners medals as well.

==== 2007–08 ====
Vennegoor of Hesselink started the new season well, scoring five goals in his first six league matches. After shaking off injury, he started to find some form and by January his performances improved immensely, delivering a Man of the Match performance and scoring against in a 5–1 thrashing of Kilmarnock in the Scottish Cup. He followed that up with a goal against Hearts on 16 February and then a stunning diving header against Barcelona four days later to give Celtic a 1–0 lead in the Champions League Round of 16 first-leg at Celtic Park, although Barcelona won the match 3–2. On 16 April, Vennegoor of Hesselink scored his first Old Firm goal against Rangers at Celtic Park in injury-time to give Celtic a 2–1 win. Many saw that goal as the major turning point in Celtic's incredible comeback to win the league. On 22 May, the last day of the season, he scored what proved to be the league-winning goal with a powerful header off a corner kick against Dundee United at Tannadice Park. It was Vennegoor of Hesselink's 20th goal of the season and rounded off another successful year for both player and club, as the big striker and teammate Scott McDonald struck up an extremely productive partnership, leading most strike pairings in the UK for almost the entire season, a total of 40 scored by the pair combined in the league alone and 51 in total.

==== 2008–09 ====
The 2008–09 season started slowly for Vennegoor of Hesselink. On 31 August, just three minutes after coming on as a substitute, he was sent off against Rangers at Celtic Park for kicking out at Rangers' Kirk Broadfoot. Rangers won the match 4–2. He scored his first goals of the season against Aberdeen in a 3–2 win at Celtic Park on 27 September, with his second being a last-minute winner. Vennegoor of Hesselink then went on a long goal drought (mainly due to the fact that he was out injured for over three months) until 4 April 2009, when he scored the final goal of Celtic's 4–0 win against Hamilton Academical with a simple tap-in. He scored again four days later in another 4–0 victory with another simple tap-in, this time the second against Falkirk. The big striker made it three goals in three games on 11 April when he scored the opening goal against Hearts at Tynecastle with less than 25 seconds on the clock. The game ended 1–1 with Bruno Aguiar scoring the equaliser for Hearts. It was then four in four when he scored a 43rd-minute opener in a 2–0 win at home to Aberdeen on 18 April. He ended the season with a League Cup winners' medal, after Celtic beat Rangers 2–0 in the final on 15 March. Although Celtic did not lose any games in which Vennegoor of Hesselink scored in the 2008–09 season, he was released at the end of his contract in July 2009.

=== Hull City ===
On 3 September 2009, Vennegoor of Hesselink signed a two-year contract with Premier League club Hull City. He made his debut for the club against Sunderland on 12 September when he came on as a substitute for Craig Fagan. He scored his first goal for the club with the opening goal in the 2–1 home win against Wigan Athletic on 3 October 2009. He also gained another winner with a last minute strike against Stoke after coming on as a substitute.

His contract with Hull City expired at the end of the 2009–10 season, and as of 1 July 2010 was confirmed as a free agent by officials at Hull City, along with fellow former Dutch national team player, George Boateng.

=== Rapid Wien ===
On 30 August 2010, Vennegoor of Hesselink joined Rapid Wien as a free agent on a two-year deal after his contract expired with Hull City. Vennegoor of Hesselink said on the club's official website: "I received several interesting offers from European clubs. However, Rapid's offer gave me and my family the best feeling. This club and this city made it an easy decision for me to join Rapid. I'm looking forward to the next chapter in my career". On 21 October, he scored the first goal to help his side to a 2–0 away win against Bulgarian outfit CSKA Sofia in a UEFA Europa League match.

Vennegoor of Hesselink did not play many games in the 2010–11 season, due to several injuries. After a muscle rupture in May, his season was therefore over. In June, player and club agreed to terminate his contract.

=== Return to PSV ===
After his departure from Rapid Wien, Vennegoor of Hesselink trained with the Twente youth team. On 4 October 2011, it was announced that he had joined PSV to train with the first team squad. On 3 November 2011, he signed until the end of the season.

On 15 May 2012, Vennegoor of Hesselink announced his retirement from professional football.

== International career ==
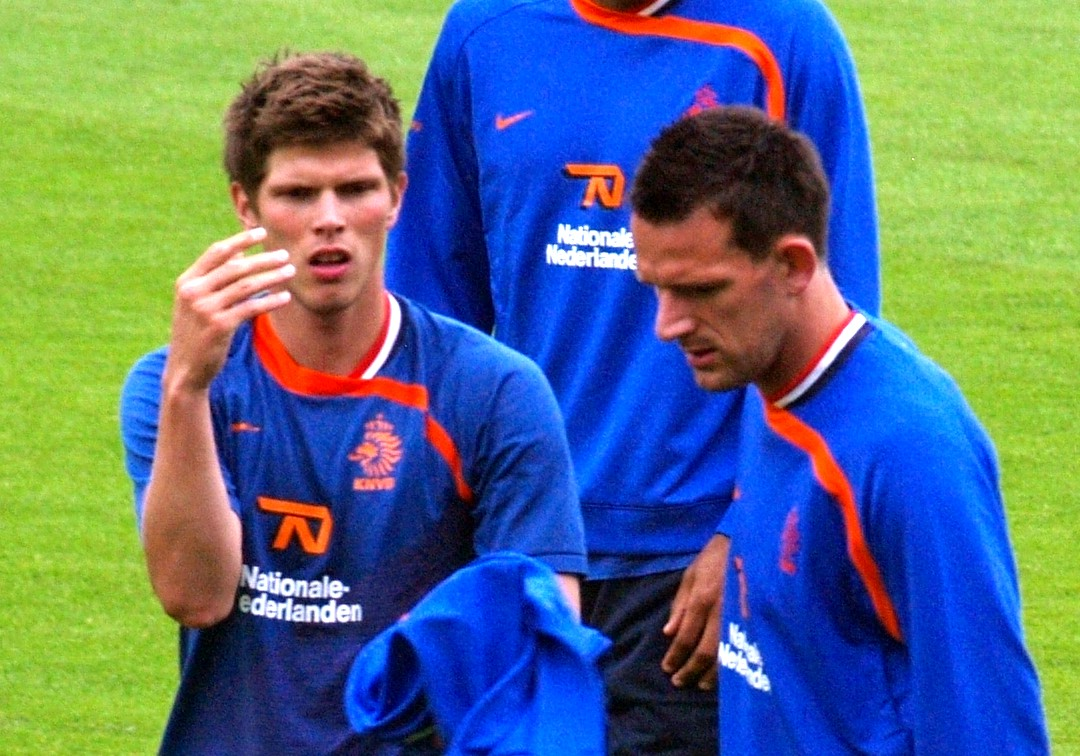
Vennegoor of Hesselink (right) with Klaas-Jan Huntelaar in training prior to Euro 2008

Vennegoor of Hesselink made his international debut for the Netherlands on 11 October 2000 in Rotterdam in a 2–0 World Cup qualifier defeat against Portugal, but did not score his first international goal until almost seven years later, in a friendly match against Thailand on 6 June 2007.

At the 2006 FIFA World Cup in Germany, Vennegoor of Hesselink made one late substitute appearance in place of Phillip Cocu in the 1–0 last 16 defeat to Portugal. After scoring earlier in the year in friendly wins over Croatia and Austria, he was chosen for UEFA Euro 2008, where his one appearance was again as a late replacement, this time for Klaas-Jan Huntelaar in a 2–0 group win over Romania.

== Personal life ==
Vennegoor of Hesselink has a son, Lucas, who plays for FC Twente.

== Career statistics ==
=== Club ===
Appearances and goals by club, season and competition
Club	Season	League			National cup		League cup		Europe		Total	
Club	Season	Division	Apps	Goals	Apps	Goals	Apps	Goals	Apps	Goals	Apps	Goals
Twente	1996–97	Eredivisie	12	0	1	0	–		–		13	0
Twente	1997–98	Eredivisie	28	4	5	0	–		5 (Note: Appearances in UEFA Cup)	1	38	5
Twente	1998–99	Eredivisie	34	21	5	3	–		–		39	24
Twente	1999–2000	Eredivisie	34	19	4	5	–		–		37	24
Twente	2000–01	Eredivisie	34	15	8	8	–		–		42	23
Twente	Total		142	59	23	16	–		5	1	169	76
PSV	2001–02	Eredivisie	34	22		0	–		8	3	42	23
PSV	2002–03	Eredivisie	32	8	2	0	–		4 (Note: Appearances in UEFA Champions League)	0	38	8
PSV	2003–04	Eredivisie	30	12	2	2	–		9	1	41	15
PSV	2004–05	Eredivisie	28	19	3	2	–		12	3	43	23
PSV	2005–06	Eredivisie	32	11	3	2	–		7	1	42	14
PSV	2006–07	Eredivisie	1	1	–		–		–		1	1
PSV	Total		157	73	10	6	–		40	8	207	85
Celtic	2006–07	Scottish Premier League	21	13	4	4	1	0	4	1	30	18
Celtic	2007–08	Scottish Premier League	31	15	4	3	2	1	8	1	46	20
Celtic	2008–09	Scottish Premier League	25	6	3	0	2	0	2	0	32	6
Celtic	Total		78	34	11	7	5	1	14	2	108	44
Hull City	2009–10	Premier League	31	3	1	0	1	0	–		33	3
Rapid Wien	2010–11	Austrian Bundesliga	10	2	1	1	–		2 (Note: Appearances in UEFA Europa League)	1	13	4
PSV	2011–12	Eredivisie	17	2	1	0	0	0	0	0	18	2
Career total			435	173	47	30	6	1	61	12	549	214

=== International ===
Scores and results list Netherlands goal tally first

Goal	Date	Venue	Opponent	Score	Result	Competition
1	6 June 2007	Rajamangala National Stadium, Bangkok, Thailand	Thailand	3–1	3–1	Friendly
2	6 February 2008	Stadion Maksimir, Zagreb, Croatia	Croatia	3–0	3–0	Friendly
3	26 March 2008	Ernst-Happel-Stadion, Vienna, Austria	Austria	3–3	4–3	Friendly

== Honours ==
Twente

- KNVB Cup: 2000–01

PSV

- Eredivisie: 2002–03, 2004–05, 2005–06
- KNVB Cup: 2004–05, 2011–12

Celtic

- Scottish Premier League: 2006–07, 2007–08
- Scottish Cup: 2006–07
- Scottish League Cup: 2008–09
