= Remco van der Schaaf =

Dutch footballer (born 1979)

Personal information
- Full name: Remco Jelmer van der Schaaf
- Date of birth: 28 February 1979 (age 47)
- Place of birth: Ten Boer, Netherlands
- Height: 6 ft 1 in (1.85 m)
- Positions: Defensive midfielder; centre-back

Youth career
- VV Omlandia
- TOP Oss

Senior career*
Years	Team	Apps	(Gls)
1997–2002	Vitesse Arnhem	82	(5)
2000	→ Fortuna Sittard (loan)	4	(0)
2002–2005	PSV	39	(1)
2005–2008	Vitesse Arnhem	70	(5)
2008–2011	Burnley	1	(0)
2009–2011	→ Brøndby (loan)	44	(6)
2011–2013	Randers	24	(3)
Total		264	(20)

International career
1997	Netherlands U18	2	(0)
1997–1998	Netherlands U19	4	(1)
1999–2001	Netherlands U21	9	(0)
- * Club domestic league appearances and goals

Remco Jelmer van der Schaaf (born 28 February 1979) is a Dutch former professional footballer who played as a midfielder.

== Club career ==
Van der Schaaf was born in Ten Boer, Groningen. After playing youth football for VV Omlandia and TOP Oss, he began his professional career in 1997 at Vitesse Arnhem, where he spent part of the 1999–2000 season on loan at Fortuna Sittard.

Van der Schaaf signed for PSV Eindhoven in 2002, and was injured in a 2004 UEFA Cup match by Titus Bramble of Newcastle United. Van der Schaaf re-signed for Vitesse in 2005, and in July 2008 he signed a three-year deal with Burnley, turning down a contract from Welsh side Cardiff City in the process. He made his debut for Burnley against Sheffield Wednesday on 9 August 2008 however this proved to be his first and only appearance for the club.

Van der Schaaf signed on loan for Danish Superliga side Brøndby IF in February 2009, where he stayed until the end of the 2008–09 season.

in January 2010, van der Schaaf once again signed on loan for Brøndby IF on a one-and-a-half-year contract, thus seeing out his contract with Burnley.

In July 2011 he joined the Danish club Randers FC on a two-year contract.

== International career ==
Van der Schaaf has represented the Dutch under-21 side.
