= 2004–05 KNVB Cup =

Tournament details
- Country: Netherlands
- Teams: 85

Final positions
- Champions: PSV
- Runners-up: Willem II

Tournament statistics
- Top goal scorer: Mourad Mghizrat (6)

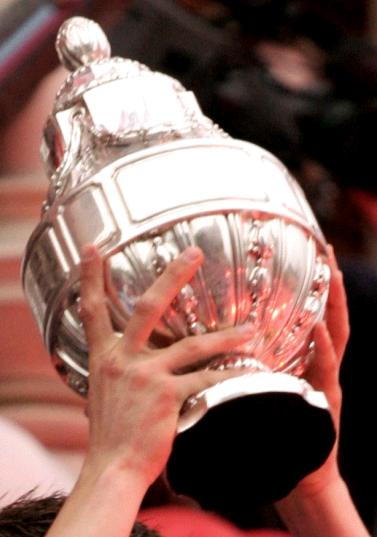
KNVB Cup

The 2004-05 KNVB Cup (at the time called Amstel Cup) was the 87th edition of the Dutch national football annual knockout tournament for the KNVB Cup. 85 teams contested, beginning on 7 August 2004 and ending at the final on 29 May 2005.

PSV beat Willem II 4–0, winning the trophy for the eighth time.

== Participants ==
A total of 85 clubs participated in this year's edition:

- 18 clubs from the 2004–05 Eredivisie
- 19 clubs from the Eerste Divisie 2004–05
- 46 amateurs clubs from the Hoofdklasse and below
- 2 youth teams

== First round ==
The matches of the first round were played on August 7 and 10, 2004.

Home team	Result	Away team
Willem II _{E}	5–0	SV Meerssen _{A}
Sparta Rotterdam _{1}	7–0	SV TOP _{A}
UDI '19/Beter Bed _{A}	1–5	Roda JC _{E}
FC Omniworld _{A}	3–4	FC Emmen _{1}
SV Spakenburg _{A}	0–1	Vitesse Arnhem _{E}
WHC _{A}	5–0	ONS Sneek _{A}
Be Quick '28 _{A}	1–5	SC Cambuur-Leeuwarden _{1}
RBC Roosendaal _{E}	4–0	JVC Cuijk _{A}
Be Quick 1887 _{A}	0–4	Quick '20 _{A}
DOS Kampen _{A}	1–2	IJsselmeervogels _{A}
SC Genemuiden _{A}	0–11	Go Ahead Eagles _{1}
Rijnsburgse Boys _{A}	1–2	VVV-Venlo _{1}
HSC '21 _{A}	1–2	ADO '20 _{A}
Quick Boys _{A}	9–0	DBS _{A}
TOGR _{A}	1–4	TOP Oss _{1}
VV Dongen _{A}	0–5	Young Feyenoord
ROHDA Raalte _{A}	2–1	Young Ajax
AGOVV Apeldoorn _{1}	9–2	SDCP _{A}
GDA _{A}	0–6	ADO Den Haag _{E}

Home team	Result	Away team
Ajax (amateurs) _{A}	0–3	FC Zwolle _{1}
GSV '28 _{A}	0–3	Fortuna Sittard _{1}
FC Dordrecht _{1}	7–1	SVV Scheveningen _{A}
Westlandia _{A}	2–2 (p)	FC Eindhoven _{1}
DOVO _{A}	0–4	FC Lisse _{A}
UNA _{A}	0–9	FC Den Bosch _{E}
Schijndel/SBA Euro _{A}	2–2 (p)	Helmond Sport _{1}
SV Babberich _{A}	0–3	FC Volendam _{1}
Ter Leede _{A}	0–3	NAC Breda _{E}
De Treffers _{A}	2–0	MVV _{1}
ACV _{A}	1–5	FC Groningen _{E}
VV Bennekom _{A}	0–7	BV Veendam _{1}
AFC _{A}	0–2	Stormvogels Telstar _{1}
Heracles Almelo _{1}	9–1	Sporting Maroc _{A}
VV Baronie _{A}	(p)1-1	Elinkwijk _{A}
De Graafschap _{E}	4–0	Harkemase Boys _{A}
RKC Waalwijk _{E}	4–0	Achilles '29 _{A}
FC Twente _{E}	8–0	Sparta Nijkerk _{A}
HFC Haarlem _{1}	4–0	Hollandia _{A}
Excelsior _{1}	7–2	SV Triborgh _{A}

_{E} Eredivisie; _{1} Eerste Divisie; _{A} Amateur teams

== Second round ==
The matches of the second round were played on September 21, and 22, 2005. NEC Nijmegen received a bye for the first round and entered the tournament here.

Home team	Result	Away team
FC Den Bosch	8–0	Quick '20
ADO '20	3–0	ROHDA Raalte
Helmond Sport	3–1	De Treffers
FC Groningen	1–2	NAC Breda
Roda JC	3–0	Excelsior
NEC _{E}	4–0	RBC Roosendaal
FC Twente	3–0	VV Baronie
ADO Den Haag	3–0	FC Zwolle
SC Cambuur-Leeuwarden	0–2	Stormvogels Telstar
Willem II	2–0	Sparta Rotterdam

Home team	Result	Away team
Fortuna Sittard	1–3	Heracles Almelo
VVV-Venlo	0–2	Young Feyenoord
FC Emmen	5–1	WHC
De Graafschap	0–4	Go Ahead Eagles
IJsselmeervogels	3–4	BV Veendam
RKC Waalwijk	1–0	FC Eindhoven
TOP Oss	4–2	HFC Haarlem
FC Lisse	1–2	FC Volendam
FC Dordrecht	6–1	Quick Boys
AGOVV Apeldoorn	0–2	Vitesse Arnhem

_{E} one Eredivisie entrant

== Third round ==
The matches of the third round were played on November 9, and 10, 2004.

Home team	Result	Away team
Young Feyenoord	1–1 (p)	RKC Waalwijk
FC Den Bosch	1–0	Vitesse Arnhem
ADO '20	0–3	NAC Breda
NEC	0–2	FC Twente
BV Veendam	4–5	Willem II
ADO Den Haag	3–1	FC Emmen
FC Volendam	3–1	Heracles Almelo
Helmond Sport	2–4	TOP Oss
Go Ahead Eagles	2–0	Roda JC
Stormvogels Telstar	0–2	FC Dordrecht

== Round of 16 ==
The matches were played on January 25, 26 and 27, 2005. Six Eredivisie clubs entered the tournament here, because they had been playing in the Champions League and UEFA Cup.

Home team	Result	Away team
Ajax _{E}	2–0	sc Heerenveen _{E}
AZ _{E}	1–3	Feyenoord _{E}
ADO Den Haag	(p) 1-1	FC Twente
NAC Breda	(p) 2-1	FC Utrecht _{E}
TOP Oss	(p) 1-1	RKC Waalwijk
Go Ahead Eagles	0–1	Willem II
PSV _{E}	4–0	FC Volendam
FC Dordrecht	1–3	FC Den Bosch

_{E} six Eredivisie entrants

== Quarter-finals ==
The matches were played on 1-2 March 2005.

Home team	Result	Away team
ADO Den Haag	0–2	Ajax
Willem II	3–0	FC Den Bosch
Feyenoord	4–0	NAC Breda
PSV	6–1	TOP Oss

== Semi-finals ==
20 April 2005
20:45

Feyenoord	1–1	PSV
Kalou 4'		Beasley 89'
Penalties
	2 - 4

De Kuip, Rotterdam
Attendance: 35,000
Referee: Dick van Egmond

21 April 2005
20:45

Willem II	1–0	Ajax
Caluwé 38'

Willem II Stadion, Tilburg
Attendance: 14,500
Referee: Roelof Luinge

== Final ==
29 May 2005
18:00 CEST

Willem II	0–4	PSV
	Report	Bouma 45'; Cocu 51'; Park 74'; Vennegoor of Hesselink 90'

De Kuip, Rotterdam
Attendance: 35,000
Referee: Eric Braamhaar

PSV also won the Dutch Eredivisie championship, thereby taking the double. They would participate in the Champions League, so finalists Willem II could play in the UEFA Cup.
