= 2004–05 Eredivisie =

49th season of the Eredivisie

Eredivisie
- Season: 2004–05
- Dates: 13 August 2004 – 22 May 2005
- Champions: PSV (18th title)
- Promoted: FC Den Bosch; De Graafschap
- Relegated: De Graafschap; FC Den Bosch
- Champions League: PSV; Ajax
- UEFA Cup: AZ; Feyenoord sc Heerenveen; Willem II
- Intertoto Cup: Roda JC
- Top goalscorer: (Netherlands) Dirk Kuyt (29 goals)

Locations of the 2004–05 Eredivisie teams

The 2004–05 season of the Eredivisie started on August 13, 2004, and ended on May 22, 2005. The title was won by PSV. FC Den Bosch and De Graafschap were relegated to the Eerste Divisie at the end of the season.

== Promoted teams ==
- FC Den Bosch (Eerste Divisie champion)
- De Graafschap (6th, promoted through playoffs)

== Relegated at the end of the season ==
- De Graafschap (17th, relegated through playoffs)
- FC Den Bosch (18th)

== League table ==
Pos	Team	Pld	W	D	L	GF	GA	GD	Pts	Qualification or relegation
1	PSV (C)	34	27	6	1	89	18	+71	87	Qualification to Champions League group stage (Note: PSV also won the 2004–05 KNVB Cup, thereby taking the double. They would participate in the Champions League, so finalists Willem II could play in the UEFA Cup.)
2	Ajax	34	24	5	5	74	33	+41	77	Qualification to Champions League third qualifying round
3	AZ	34	19	7	8	71	41	+30	64	Qualification to UEFA Cup first round
4	Feyenoord	34	19	5	10	90	51	+39	62	Qualification to UEFA Cup first round
5	Heerenveen	34	18	6	10	64	52	+12	60	Qualification to UEFA Cup first round
6	Twente	34	15	9	10	48	38	+10	54	
7	Vitesse Arnhem	34	16	6	12	53	49	+4	54	
8	Roda JC	34	13	8	13	60	55	+5	47	Qualification to Intertoto Cup third round
9	RKC Waalwijk	34	13	8	13	44	51	−7	47	
10	Willem II	34	13	6	15	44	56	−12	45	Qualification to UEFA Cup first round
11	Utrecht	34	12	8	14	40	43	−3	44	
12	Groningen	34	11	7	16	50	58	−8	40	
13	NEC	34	9	10	15	41	47	−6	37	
14	ADO Den Haag	34	10	6	18	44	59	−15	36	
15	NAC Breda	34	9	8	17	43	67	−24	35	
16	RBC Roosendaal	34	10	2	22	38	77	−39	32	Qualification to Relegation play-offs
17	De Graafschap (R)	34	4	7	23	32	78	−46	19	Qualification to Relegation play-offs
18	Den Bosch (R)	34	5	4	25	23	75	−52	19	Relegation to Eerste Divisie

Source: Eredivisie
Rules for classification: 1) Points; 2) Goal difference; 3) Goals scored; 4) Head-to-head points; 5) Head-to-head goal difference; 6) Head-to-head away goals scored; 7) Play-off if relevant for deciding champion, relegation or participating in a European league, otherwise by draw. 8) Penalty shoot-out (only after a play-off)
(C) Champions; (R) Relegated

== Results ==
Home \ Away	ADO	AJA	AZA	GRA	DBO	GRO	TWE	UTR	FEY	NAC	NEC	PSV	RBC	RKC	RJC	HEE	VIT	WIL
ADO Den Haag		3–3	2–1	2–0	2–0	0–3	0–1	1–0	2–0	6–2	1–2	0–2	5–1	0–0	1–4	0–2	0–4	0–1
Ajax	0–0		4–2	1–0	2–0	2–1	1–2	1–1	1–1	6–2	1–0	0–4	4–1	4–0	1–0	1–3	1–0	2–0
AZ	2–0	0–0		3–2	5–0	2–1	5–0	4–0	4–1	1–1	1–1	0–0	1–3	3–0	1–1	1–1	3–0	3–1
De Graafschap	1–2	0–5	1–3		1–1	2–2	0–0	0–0	2–7	0–2	3–2	0–4	0–1	2–4	2–0	2–1	1–2	2–2
Den Bosch	1–0	0–5	0–1	0–2		1–2	1–0	0–3	4–1	0–2	0–0	0–3	2–1	0–2	0–3	2–4	1–2	1–2
FC Groningen	4–3	0–4	1–2	1–0	3–1		0–1	3–0	0–2	2–3	0–0	0–1	3–0	0–0	4–4	1–2	0–0	1–1
FC Twente	2–1	2–3	3–0	0–0	4–0	1–2		0–1	0–0	0–0	2–1	2–2	3–0	3–1	2–3	4–1	1–4	0–0
FC Utrecht	2–0	0–2	3–2	1–0	1–0	1–2	2–2		0–2	2–0	1–0	0–0	5–1	3–2	1–1	0–1	1–2	0–3
Feyenoord	6–3	2–3	4–2	6–1	4–2	1–2	3–1	0–3		4–0	2–1	3–3	3–0	4–0	4–1	1–3	1–2	7–0
NAC Breda	1–1	1–2	0–3	3–2	3–0	1–4	1–1	3–2	0–2		1–2	2–2	1–2	0–4	4–0	1–1	1–2	1–2
NEC	1–1	0–1	1–2	3–0	2–2	4–3	0–2	0–0	2–0	3–3		0–3	3–0	1–0	1–1	3–2	1–1	2–0
PSV Eindhoven	4–0	2–0	5–1	4–1	3–0	3–0	2–0	2–0	4–2	4–0	4–1		4–1	1–0	0–2	4–0	3–0	1–0
RBC Roosendaal	2–0	1–4	0–2	3–0	1–2	2–2	0–1	0–1	0–4	0–0	1–0	2–5		0–1	3–1	1–3	4–1	2–0
RKC Waalwijk	1–3	1–2	2–1	2–2	2–0	3–0	1–0	2–2	2–4	1–0	2–2	1–4	2–0		1–0	0–0	2–2	1–0
Roda JC	1–1	1–2	1–1	2–1	5–0	5–1	1–2	3–2	0–2	2–1	1–0	0–0	3–1	1–1		2–3	2–3	4–0
SC Heerenveen	1–0	2–1	1–3	2–0	2–1	1–0	1–2	2–1	2–2	3–0	2–1	0–3	7–1	1–2	3–4		0–3	2–2
Vitesse Arnhem	3–4	0–2	0–3	3–1	0–0	1–0	1–1	2–1	1–1	1–2	1–0	0–2	1–3	3–1	3–0	1–3		2–0
Willem II	1–0	1–3	1–3	4–1	2–1	4–2	0–3	0–0	0–4	0–1	3–1	0–1	3–0	3–0	3–1	2–2	3–2	

Legend: Blue = home team win; Yellow = draw; Red = away team win.

== Promotion/relegation play-offs ==
Group A
Pos	Team	Pld	W	D	L	GF	GA	GD	Pts	Qualification
1	RBC Roosendaal	6	3	2	1	9	3	+6	11	Qualified for 2005–06 Eredivisie
2	FC Volendam	6	2	3	1	11	9	+2	9	
3	Stormvogels Telstar	6	2	2	2	9	10	−1	8	
4	VVV-Venlo	6	1	1	4	6	13	−7	4	

Group B
Pos	Team	Pld	W	D	L	GF	GA	GD	Pts	Qualification or relegation
1	Sparta Rotterdam	6	5	0	1	13	5	+8	15	Qualified for 2005–06 Eredivisie
2	Helmond Sport	6	2	3	1	11	6	+5	9	
3	De Graafschap	6	2	2	2	11	10	+1	8	Relegated to 2005–06 Eerste Divisie
4	FC Zwolle	6	0	1	5	6	20	−14	1	

== Top scorers ==
Pos.	Player	Club	Goals
1.	(Netherlands) Dirk Kuyt	Feyenoord	29
2.	(Ivory Coast) Salomon Kalou	Feyenoord	20
3.	(Netherlands) Jan Vennegoor of Hesselink	PSV	19
4.	(Netherlands) Klaas-Jan Huntelaar	SC Heerenveen	16
4.	(Norway) Erik Nevland	FC Groningen	16
4.	(Switzerland) Blaise Nkufo	FC Twente	16
7.	(Ivory Coast) Arouna Koné	Roda JC	15
8.	(Netherlands) Mark van Bommel	PSV	14
9.	(Ghana) Matthew Amoah	Vitesse Arnhem	13
9.	(Morocco) Ali Boussaboun	NAC Breda	13
9.	(Denmark) Kenneth Perez	AZ	13
12.	(Netherlands) Rick Hoogendorp	RKC Waalwijk	12
12.	(Netherlands) Geert den Ouden	ADO Den Haag	12
14.	(Australia) Jason Čulina	FC Twente	11
14.	(Greece) Georgios Samaras	SC Heerenveen	11
14.	(Brazil) Sérgio	Roda JC	11

=== Awards ===
==== Dutch Footballer of the Year ====
- 2004-05 — Mark van Bommel (PSV)

== Attendances ==
No.	Club	Average	Change	Highest
1	AFC Ajax	48,571	-0,9%	50,765
2	Feyenoord	38,282	-8,3%	46,500
3	PSV	31,688	-3,5%	35,000
4	FC Utrecht	19,611	13,0%	22,600
5	SBV Vitesse	18,799	-0,3%	22,913
6	sc Heerenveen	18,436	26,3%	21,000
7	FC Twente	13,118	0,5%	13,460
8	Roda JC	12,710	-2,7%	17,500
9	NAC Breda	12,554	-0,8%	15,124
10	Willem II	12,497	-2,4%	13,100
11	FC Groningen	11,968	-2,0%	12,930
12	NEC	11,797	-3,8%	12,500
13	De Graafschap	11,106	27,0%	11,900
14	AZ	8,267	6,9%	8,940
15	ADO Den Haag	6,363	-11,8%	8,412
16	FC Den Bosch	5,855	56,2%	7,280
17	RKC Waalwijk	5,812	-1,5%	7,500
18	RBC Roosendaal	4,841	-2,8%	5,000

== See also ==
- 2004–05 Eerste Divisie
- 2004–05 KNVB Cup
