= 1998–99 Willem II season =

Willem II
1998–99 season
- Manager: Co Adriaanse
- Stadium: Willem II Stadion
- Eredivisie: 2nd
- KNVB Cup: First round
- UEFA Cup: Second round
- Top goalscorer: Mariano Bombarda (17)

During the 1998–99 Dutch football season, Willem II competed in the Eredivisie. Willem II achieved second place in the league, the club's best placement to date.

== Season summary ==
Managed by Co Adriaanse, Willem II finished in fifth place in the 1997–98 Eredivisie, thereby securing qualification for the 1998–99 UEFA Cup. In the UEFA Cup's first round the club knocked out Georgian side Dinamo Tbilisi with two 3–0 wins. Willem II exited the competition in the second round, following a 1–1 draw and a 3–0 defeat against Spanish club Real Betis. In the 1998–99 KNVB Cup Willem II were knocked out in the first round by FC Zwolle with Geoffrey Prommayon scoring an own-goal in a game that finished 2–0.

Willem II achieved second place in the Eredivisie, the club's best placement to date, qualifying for the UEFA Champions League for the first time in the club's history. Argentina forward Mariano Bombarda was one of the most important players during the season, scoring 17 goals. At the winter break, Willem II was in 11th place. Thanks to a very successful run in the second half of the season, with only one defeat on the final day of the season against FC Twente, the club climbed to second place.

Willem II sold 10,000 season tickets for the season and drew a total of 204,780 spectators.

In May 1999, it was chosen as club of the season by the VVCS, the trade union of professional footballers in the Netherlands.

== First-team squad ==
Note: Flags indicate national team as defined under FIFA eligibility rules; some limited exceptions apply. Players may hold more than one non-FIFA nationality.

| No. | Pos. | Nation | Player |
|---|---|---|---|
| — | GK | NED | Jim van Fessem |
| — | GK | BEL | Kris Mampaey |
| — | DF | NED | Reinder Hendriks |
| — | DF | NED | Delano Hill |
| — | DF | FIN | Sami Hyypiä |
| — | DF | NED | Joris Mathijsen |
| — | DF | NED | Mark Schenning |
| — | DF | HUN | István Szekér |
| — | DF | NED | Frank van Kouwen |
| — | DF | NED | Jos van Nieuwstadt |
| — | DF | THA | Geoffrey Prommayon |
| — | MF | NED | Yassine Abdellaoui |
| — | MF | NED | Arno Arts |

| No. | Pos. | Nation | Player |
|---|---|---|---|
| — | MF | CZE | Tomáš Galásek |
| — | MF | MAR | Adil Ramzi |
| — | MF | NED | Dennis Schulp |
| — | MF | NED | Raymond Victoria |
| — | FW | ARG | Mariano Bombarda |
| — | FW | GAM | Jatto Ceesay |
| — | FW | NED | Marco Heering |
| — | FW | NED | Erwin Hermes |
| — | FW | NED | Huub Loeffen |
| — | FW | NED | Marino Promes |
| — | FW | BFA | Ousmane Sanou |
| — | FW | NED | Marcel Valk |

== Transfers ==
Out

- Bert Konterman - Feyenoord
- Joonas Kolkka - PSV Eindhoven

== Competitions ==
=== Eredivisie ===
==== League table ====
| Pos | Team | Pld | W | D | L | GF | GA | GD | Pts | Qualification or relegation |
|---|---|---|---|---|---|---|---|---|---|---|
| 1 | Feyenoord (C) | 34 | 25 | 5 | 4 | 76 | 38 | +38 | 80 | Qualification to Champions League group stage |
| 2 | Willem II | 34 | 20 | 5 | 9 | 69 | 46 | +23 | 65 | Qualification to Champions League group stage |
| 3 | PSV | 34 | 17 | 10 | 7 | 87 | 55 | +32 | 61 | Qualification to Champions League third qualifying round |
| 4 | Vitesse Arnhem | 34 | 18 | 7 | 9 | 61 | 44 | +17 | 61 | Qualification to UEFA Cup first round (Note: Ajax qualified for the UEFA Cup by winning the 1998–99 KNVB Cup.) |
| 5 | Roda JC | 34 | 17 | 9 | 8 | 59 | 40 | +19 | 60 | Qualification to UEFA Cup first round |

Source: rsssf.com
Rules for classification: 1) Points; 2) Goal difference; 3) Goals scored; 4) Head-to-head points; 5) Head-to-head goal difference; 6) Head-to-head away goals scored; 7) Play-off if relevant for deciding champion, relegation or participating in a European league, otherwise by draw. 8) Penalty shoot-out (only after a play-off)
(C) Champions

=== KNVB Cup ===
==== Results ====
| 28 October 1998 R1 | Willem II | 0–2 | FC Zwolle | Tilburg, Netherlands |
| | | Report | 55' Tuhuteru; 83' (o.g.) Prommayon | Stadium: Gemeentelijk Sportpark Tilburg |

=== UEFA Cup ===
==== Results ====
| 15 September 1998 R1 First leg | Willem II (Netherlands) | 3–0 | (Georgia (country)) Dinamo Tbilisi | Koning Willem II Stadion, Tilburg |
| 18:30 (CET) | Ramzi 74'; Arts 80'; Schenning 86' | Report | | Attendance: 10,000; Referee: Mikko Vuorela (Finland) |

| 29 September 1998 R1 Second leg | Dinamo Tbilisi (Georgia (country)) | 0–3 (0–6 agg.) | (Netherlands) Willem II | Boris Paichadze National Stadium, Tbilisi |
| 16:30 (CET) | | Report | Valk 19'; Ceesay 81'; Ramzi 89' | Attendance: 8,000; Referee: Lubomír Puček (Czech Republic) |

| 20 October 1998 R2 First leg | Willem II (Netherlands) | 1–1 | (Spain) Real Betis | Koning Willem II Stadion, Tilburg |
| 20:00 (CET) | Bombarda 86' | Report | Trujillo 85' | Attendance: 12,000; Referee: William Young (Scotland) |

| 3 November 1998 R2 Second leg | Real Betis (Spain) | 3–0 (4–1 agg.) | (Netherlands) Willem II | Estadio Benito Villamarín, Seville |
| 21:30 (CET) | George 29'; Benjamín 56'; Fernando 89' | Report | | Attendance: 15,000; Referee: Jacek Granat (Poland) |
