= 2001–02 Liverpool F.C. season =

English football club season

Liverpool
2001–02 season
- Chairman: David Moores
- Manager: Gérard Houllier; Phil Thompson (interim; 13 October - 18 March)
- Premier League: 2nd
- FA Cup: Fourth round
- League Cup: Third round
- Champions League: Quarter-finals
- UEFA Super Cup: Winners
- FA Charity Shield: Winners
- Top goalscorer: League: Michael Owen (19); All: Michael Owen (28)
- Average home league attendance: 41,770
Home colours	Away colours	Third colours

The 2001–2002 season was Liverpool Football Club's 110th season in existence and their 40th consecutive season in the top-flight of English football.

== Season summary ==
Having finished the previous season in third place in the Premiership, as well as winning an unprecedented treble of the League, FA and UEFA Cups, hopes were high for Liverpool going into the new season. However, fixture congestion meant that Liverpool could only play six games, taking 12 points to stand in sixth place, before Gérard Houllier was forced to go to hospital after falling ill during a game against Leeds United. It was later discovered that Houllier was suffering from a heart condition and was forced to take a five-month period of convalescence, with assistant manager Phil Thompson stepping up to take over caretaker responsibilities. In spite of this crisis, Liverpool climbed to fourth at the end of October before topping the Premier League table at the end of November, with a two-point lead over second-placed Leeds while holding a game in hand. November also saw the sale of fan favourite striker Robbie Fowler to Leeds.

Liverpool kept their lead until 17 December, when Newcastle United overtook Liverpool at the top by virtue of goals scored (30 vs 25). During the month, French striker Nicolas Anelka was signed on loan from Paris Saint-Germain until the end of the campaign as a replacement for Fowler. By the end of December, Liverpool were back to fourth (albeit with the game still in hand and a margin of only two points between them and leaders Arsenal). However, Liverpool failed to take advantage of their extra game and at the end of January were still two points off the top (Manchester United now the league leaders), although they did defeat the Red Devils 1–0 at Old Trafford. This gap increased to four points by the end of February, despite a 4–0 win away to Leeds, but Houllier's return in March coincided with an upturn of form that saw Liverpool reach the Champions League quarter-finals and reclaim top place in the Premiership with five matches left to play, although fellow title challengers Arsenal had two games in hand. Arsenal, in the midst of a twelve-match winning streak, soon overhauled Liverpool and sealed the title with a 2–0 win at Bolton Wanderers. However, on the flip side Arsenal also defeated Manchester United during this winning run, allowing Liverpool to take runners-up spot with a 5–0 home win over Ipswich Town.

The 2001–02 season was the first in which Liverpool had competed in the UEFA Champions League, and their first campaign in Europe's premier club competition (previously the European Cup) since the 1984–85 season. Liverpool topped their group in the first stage, and also progressed through the second group stage, before being knocked out into the quarter-finals by eventual finalists Bayer Leverkusen, 4–3 on aggregate.

During the close season, Houllier turned down the opportunity to sign Anelka, in favour of signing temperamental Senegalese striker El Hadji Diouf, following the latter's role in Senegal's World Cup campaign. For the fifth consecutive season, Michael Owen finished the campaign as the Reds' top goalscorer, with 28 goals in all competitions (19 in the league).

Competition	Result	Top scorer
Premier League	2nd	(England) Michael Owen, 19
Champions League	Quarter-finals	(England) Michael Owen, 5
FA Cup	Fourth round	(England) Michael Owen, 2
League Cup	Third round	(Scotland) Gary McAllister, 1
Charity Shield	Winners	(England) Michael Owen, 1 (Scotland) Gary McAllister, 1
UEFA Super Cup	Winners	(England) Emile Heskey, 1 (England) Michael Owen, 1 (Norway) John Arne Riise, 1
Overall		(England) Michael Owen, 28

== First-team squad ==
Squad at end of season

Note: Flags indicate national team as defined under FIFA eligibility rules; some limited exceptions apply. Players may hold more than one non-FIFA nationality.

No.	Pos.	Nation	Player
2	DF	SUI	Stéphane Henchoz
3	DF	POR	Abel Xavier
4	DF	FIN	Sami Hyypiä
5	FW	CZE	Milan Baroš
6	DF	GER	Markus Babbel
7	MF	CZE	Vladimír Šmicer
8	FW	ENG	Emile Heskey
9	FW	FRA	Nicolas Anelka
10	FW	ENG	Michael Owen
11	MF	ENG	Jamie Redknapp (captain)
12	GK	POL	Jerzy Dudek
13	MF	ENG	Danny Murphy
15	MF	CZE	Patrik Berger
16	MF	GER	Dietmar Hamann

No.	Pos.	Nation	Player
17	MF	ENG	Steven Gerrard
18	DF	NOR	John Arne Riise
19	GK	FRA	Pegguy Arphexad
20	MF	ENG	Nick Barmby
21	MF	SCO	Gary McAllister
22	GK	ENG	Chris Kirkland
23	DF	ENG	Jamie Carragher
24	MF	FRA	Bernard Diomède
25	DF	CRO	Igor Bišćan
27	DF	FRA	Grégory Vignal
29	DF	ENG	Stephen Wright
30	DF	FRA	Djimi Traoré (Note: Traoré was born in Saint-Ouen, France, but also qualified to represent Mali internationally and would make his international debut for Mali in 2004.)
34	FW	FIN	Daniel Sjölund
37	FW	FIN	Jari Litmanen

=== Left club during season ===
Note: Flags indicate national team as defined under FIFA eligibility rules; some limited exceptions apply. Players may hold more than one non-FIFA nationality.

No.	Pos.	Nation	Player
1	GK	NED	Sander Westerveld (to Real Sociedad)
9	FW	ENG	Robbie Fowler (to Leeds United)
31	DF	NOR	Frode Kippe (to Lillestrøm)

No.	Pos.	Nation	Player
32	FW	ENG	John Miles (to Stoke City)
33	MF	ENG	Alan Navarro (to Tranmere Rovers)

=== Reserve squad ===
Note: Flags indicate national team as defined under FIFA eligibility rules; some limited exceptions apply. Players may hold more than one non-FIFA nationality.

No.	Pos.	Nation	Player
14	DF	NOR	Vegard Heggem
26	GK	DEN	Jørgen Nielsen
28	MF	IRL	Richie Partridge
34	FW	FIN	Daniel Sjölund
—	DF	ENG	Steve McNulty
—	DF	ENG	Jon Otsemobor

No.	Pos.	Nation	Player
—	DF	ENG	Stephen Warnock
—	DF	USA	Zak Whitbread
—	MF	ENG	Mark Peers
—	MF	ENG	Stephen Vaughan
—	MF	ENG	John Welsh
—	FW	ENG	Neil Mellor

== Statistics ==
=== Player statistics ===
As of 25 May 2002

No.	Pos	Nat	Player	Total		FA Premier League		FA Cup		Football League Cup		UEFA Champions League	
No.	Pos	Nat	Player	Apps	Goals	Apps	Goals	Apps	Goals	Apps	Goals	Apps	Goals
12	GK	(Poland) POL	Jerzy Dudek	49	0	35	0	2	0	0	0	12	0
18	DF	(Norway) NOR	John Arne Riise	53	7	34+3	7	2	0	0	0	13+1	0
2	DF	(Switzerland) SUI	Stéphane Henchoz	54	0	37	0	2	0	0	0	15	0
23	DF	(England) ENG	Jamie Carragher	51	0	33	0	2	0	1	0	15	0
4	DF	(Finland) FIN	Sami Hyypiä	55	4	37	3	2	0	1	0	15	1
7	MF	(Czech Republic) CZE	Vladimír Šmicer	35	6	13+9	4	1	0	1	0	8+3	2
13	MF	(England) ENG	Danny Murphy	54	8	31+5	6	1+1	0	1	0	13+2	2
16	MF	(Germany) GER	Dietmar Hamann	46	1	31	1	2	0	1	0	12	0
17	MF	(England) ENG	Steven Gerrard	46	4	28+2	3	2	0	0	0	13+1	1
8	FW	(England) ENG	Emile Heskey	54	13	26+9	9	1+1	0	0+1	0	16	4
10	FW	(England) ENG	Michael Owen	41	26	25+4	19	2	2	0	0	10	5
1	GK	(Netherlands) NED	Sander Westerveld	1	0	1	0	0	0	0	0	0	0
21	MF	(Scotland) SCO	Gary McAllister	36	0	14+11	0	0	0	1	0	4+6	0
9	FW	(France) FRA	Nicolas Anelka	22	5	13+7	4	2	1	0	0	0	0
15	MF	(Czech Republic) CZE	Patrik Berger	30	1	12+9	1	0+1	0	0	0	1+7	0
29	DF	(England) ENG	Stephen Wright	17	1	10+2	0	1	0	1	0	2+1	1
3	DF	(Portugal) POR	Abel Xavier	15	2	9+1	1	0	0	0	0	5	1
37	FW	(Finland) FIN	Jari Litmanen	32	7	8+13	4	0+1	0	1	0	4+5	3
9	FW	(England) ENG	Robbie Fowler	16	4	8+2	3	0	0	0	0	2+4	1
25	MF	(Croatia) CRO	Igor Bišćan	8	0	4+1	0	0	0	0	0	1+2	0
27	DF	(France) FRA	Gregory Vignal	9	0	3+1	0	0	0	1	0	4	0
20	MF	(England) ENG	Nick Barmby	11	0	2+4	0	0	0	1	0	3+1	0
11	MF	(England) ENG	Jamie Redknapp	8	2	2+2	1	0	0	0+1	0	1+2	1
6	DF	(Germany) GER	Markus Babbel	4	1	2	0	0	0	0	1	1+1	0
19	GK	(France) FRA	Pegguy Arphexad	4	0	1+1	0	0	0	0	0	2	0
22	GK	(England) ENG	Chris Kirkland	4	0	1	0	0	0	1	0	2	0
5	FW	(Czech Republic) CZE	Milan Baroš	1	0	0	0	0	0	0	0	0+1	0
24	MF	(France) FRA	Bernard Diomède	1	0	0	0	0	0	0	0	1	0
30	DF	(France) FRA	Djimi Traoré	1	0	0	0	0	0	0	0	1	0
31	DF	(Norway) NOR	Frode Kippe	1	0	0	0	0	0	0+1	0	0	0

== Transfers ==
=== In ===
#	Pos	Player	From	Fee	Date
18	DF	(Norway) John Arne Riise	(France) Monaco	£4,000,000	20 June 2001
5	FW	(Czech Republic) Milan Baroš	(Czech Republic) Baník Ostrava	£3,200,000	26 July 2001
22	GK	(England) Chris Kirkland	(England) Coventry City	Undisclosed (estimated £6,000,000)	31 August 2001
12	GK	(Poland) Jerzy Dudek	(Netherlands) Feyenoord	£4,850,000	31 August 2001
9	FW	(France) Nicolas Anelka	(France) Paris Saint-Germain	Loan	20 December 2001
3	DF	(Portugal) Abel Xavier	(England) Everton	£750,000	30 January 2002

=== Out ===
#	Pos	Player	To	Fee	Date
3	DF	(Germany) Christian Ziege	(England) Tottenham Hotspur	£4,000,000	17 July 2001
9	FW	(England) Robbie Fowler	(England) Leeds United	£11,000,000	29 November 2001
1	GK	(Netherlands) Sander Westerveld	(Spain) Real Sociedad	£3,750,000	17 December 2001
21	MF	(Scotland) Gary McAllister	(England) Coventry City	Free	14 April 2002
11	MF	(England) Jamie Redknapp	(England) Tottenham Hotspur	Free	16 April 2002
9	FW	(France) Nicolas Anelka	(France) Paris Saint-Germain	Loan expired	12 May 2002

== Pre-season and friendlies ==
Date	Opponents	H / A	Result F–A	Scorers
10 July 2001	Bayer Leverkusen	A	3–2	Owen 41', Heskey 46', Redknapp 87'
16 July 2001	Singapore XI	A	2–0	Heskey 42', Owen 85'
19 July 2001	Thailand	A	3–1	Owen (2) 8', 44', Barmby 64'
26 July 2001	Valencia	N	1–0	Litmanen 84'
28 July 2001	Ajax	N	3–1	Fowler 38'
3 August 2001	Wolverhampton Wanderers	A	3–0	Hyypiä 27', Hamann 32', Fowler 57'

== Competitions ==
=== FA Charity Shield ===
12 August 2001	Liverpool	2–1	Manchester United	Millennium Stadium, Cardiff
15:00	McAllister 2' (pen.); Owen 16'	Report	Van Nistelrooy 51'	Attendance: 70,227; Referee: Andy D'Urso

=== UEFA Super Cup ===
24 August 2001	Bayern Munich (Germany)	2–3	(England) Liverpool	Stade Louis II, Monaco
20:45 CEST	Salihamidžić 57'; Jancker 82'	Report	Riise 23'; Heskey 45'; Owen 46'	Attendance: 13,824; Referee: Vítor Melo Pereira (Portugal)

=== Premier League ===
==== League Table ====
Pos	Team	Pld	W	D	L	GF	GA	GD	Pts	Qualification or relegation
1	Arsenal (C)	38	26	9	3	79	36	+43	87	Qualification for the Champions League first group stage
2	Liverpool	38	24	8	6	67	30	+37	80	Qualification for the Champions League first group stage
3	Manchester United	38	24	5	9	87	45	+42	77	Qualification for the Champions League third qualifying round
4	Newcastle United	38	21	8	9	74	52	+22	71	Qualification for the Champions League third qualifying round
5	Leeds United	38	18	12	8	53	37	+16	66	Qualification for the UEFA Cup first round (Note: Since Arsenal qualified for the Champions League, their UEFA Cup place as FA Cup winners defaulted to Chelsea, the losing finalists.)

Source: Premier League
Rules for classification: 1) points; 2) goal difference; 3) number of goals scored.
(C) Champions

==== Results by round ====
Round	1	2	3	4	5	6	7	8	9	10	11	12	13	14	15	16	17	18	19	20	21	22	23	24	25	26	27	28	29	30	31	32	33	34	35	36	37	38
Ground	H	A	A	H	A	H	H	A	H	A	A	H	A	H	A	H	A	H	A	A	H	A	H	H	A	A	H	A	H	A	H	H	A	H	A	H	A	H
Result	W	L	L	W	W	W	D	W	W	W	D	W	W	W	D	L	L	W	D	D	L	D	D	W	W	W	W	D	W	W	W	W	W	W	W	L	W	W
Position	7	13	16	17	10	10	7	6	6	6	5	3	3	1	1	1	2	3	3	4	5	5	5	4	4	4	4	4	3	3	3	3	2	2	2	2	2	2

Source: Competitive Matches
A = Away; H = Home; W = Win; D = Draw; L = Loss

==== Matches ====
The league fixtures were announced on 21 June 2001.

18 August 2001 1	Liverpool	2–1	West Ham United	Liverpool
	Owen 18', 77'	Report	Di Canio 30' (pen.)	Stadium: Anfield; Attendance: 43,935; Referee: Jeff Winter

27 August 2001 2	Bolton Wanderers	2–1	Liverpool	Bolton
	Ricketts 27'; Holdsworth 90'	Report	Heskey 66'	Stadium: Reebok Stadium; Attendance: 27,205; Referee: Graham Poll

8 September 2001 3	Liverpool	1–3	Aston Villa	Liverpool
	Gerrard 46', (red card)	Report	Dublin 31'; Hendrie 55'; Vassell 86'	Stadium: Anfield; Attendance: 44,102; Referee: Andy D'Urso

15 September 2001 4	Everton	1–3	Liverpool	Liverpool
	Campbell 5'	Report	Gerrard 12'; Owen 31' (pen.); Riise 52'	Stadium: Goodison Park; Attendance: 39,554; Referee: Paul Durkin

22 September 2001 5	Liverpool	1–0	Tottenham Hotspur	Liverpool
	Litmanen 57'	Report		Stadium: Anfield; Attendance: 44,116; Referee: Dermot Gallagher

30 September 2001 6	Newcastle United	0–2	Liverpool	Newcastle-upon-Tyne
		Report	Riise 3'; Murphy 86'	Stadium: St James' Park; Attendance: 52,095; Referee: Graham Barber

13 October 2001 7	Liverpool	1–1	Leeds United	Liverpool
	Murphy 67'	Report	Kewell 27'	Stadium: Anfield; Attendance: 44,352; Referee: Alan Wiley

20 October 2001 8	Leicester City	1–4	Liverpool	Leicester, East Midlands
	Wise 58'	Report	Fowler 5', 43', 90'; Hyypiä 10'	Stadium: Filbert Street; Attendance: 21,886; Referee: Mark Halsey

27 October 2001 9	Charlton Athletic	0–2	Liverpool	London
		Report	Redknapp 14'; Owen 43'; Stephen Wright (red card)	Stadium: The Valley; Attendance: 22,887; Referee: P Jones

4 November 2001 10	Liverpool	3–1	Manchester United	Liverpool
	Owen 32', 51'; Riise 39'	Report	Beckham 50'	Stadium: Anfield; Attendance: 44,361; Referee: Graham Poll

17 November 2001 11	Blackburn Rovers	1–1	Liverpool	Blackburn
	Jansen 30'	Report	Owen 52'	Stadium: Ewood Park; Attendance: 28,859; Referee: Mike Riley

25 November 2001 12	Liverpool	1–0	Sunderland	Liverpool
	Heskey 22'; Hamann (red card)	Report		Stadium: Anfield; Attendance: 43,537; Referee: Steve Bennett

1 December 2001 13	Derby County	0–1	Liverpool	Derby
			Owen 6'	Stadium: Pride Park Stadium; Attendance: 33,289; Referee: Graham Barber

8 December 2001 14	Liverpool	2–0	Middlesbrough	Liverpool
	Owen 27'; Berger 45'	Report		Stadium: Anfield; Attendance: 43,674; Referee: Dermot Gallagher

12 December 2001 15	Liverpool	0–0	Fulham	Liverpool
		Report		Stadium: Anfield; Attendance: 37,163; Referee: Jeff Winter

16 December 2001 16	Chelsea	4–0	Liverpool	London
	Le Saux 3'; Hasselbaink 28'; Dalla Bona 71'; Guðjohnsen 90'	Report		Stadium: Stamford Bridge; Attendance: 41,174; Referee: Mark Halsey

23 December 2001 17	Liverpool	1–2	Arsenal	Liverpool
	Litmanen 55'	Report	Van Bronckhorst (yellow card) 19' (yellow-red card) 35'; Henry 45' (pen.); Ljungberg 53'	Stadium: Anfield; Attendance: 44,297; Referee: Paul Durkin

26 December 2001 18	Aston Villa	1–2	Liverpool	Birmingham
	Hendrie 21'	Report	Litmanen 9'; Šmicer 73'	Stadium: Villa Park; Attendance: 42,602; Referee: Andy D'Urso

29 December 2001 19	West Ham United	1–1	Liverpool	London
	Sinclair 39'	Report	Owen 88'	Stadium: Boleyn Ground; Attendance: 35,103; Referee: Rob Styles

1 January 2002 20	Liverpool	1–1	Bolton Wanderers	Liverpool
	Gerrard 50'	Report	Nolan 78'	Stadium: Anfield; Attendance: 43,710; Referee: C Wilkes

9 January 2002 21	Southampton	2–0	Liverpool	Southampton
	Beattie 60' (pen.); Riise 71' (o.g.)	Report		Stadium: St Mary's Stadium; Attendance: 31,527; Referee: Graham Poll

13 January 2002 22	Arsenal	1–1	Liverpool	London
	Ljungberg 62'	Report	Riise 68'	Stadium: Highbury; Attendance: 38,132; Referee: Steve Dunn

19 January 2002 23	Liverpool	1–1	Southampton	Liverpool
	Owen 8'	Report	Davies 46'	Stadium: Anfield; Attendance: 43,710; Referee: Neale Barry

22 January 2002 24	Manchester United	0–1	Liverpool	Manchester
		Report	Murphy 85'	Stadium: Old Trafford; Attendance: 67,599; Referee: Graham Barber

31 January 2002 25	Liverpool	1–0	Leicester City	Liverpool
	Heskey 56'	[Report]		Stadium: Anfield; Attendance: 42,305; Referee: Barry Knight

3 February 2002 26	Leeds United	0–4	Liverpool	Leeds, Yorkshire
		Report	Ferdinand 16' (o.g.); Heskey 63', 66'; Owen 90'	Stadium: Elland Road; Attendance: 40,216; Referee: Graham Poll

9 February 2002 27	Ipswich Town	0–6	Liverpool	Ipswich
		Report	Xavier 16'; Heskey 43', 90'; Hyypiä 52'; Owen 62', 71'	Stadium: Portman Road; Attendance: 25,608; Referee: Steve Bennett

23 February 2002 28	Liverpool	1–1	Everton	Liverpool
	Anelka 72'	Report	Radzinski 52'	Stadium: Anfield; Attendance: 44,371; Referee: D Elleray

2 March 2002 29	Fulham	0–2	Liverpool	London
		Report	Anelka 13'; Litmanen 90'	Stadium: Craven Cottage; Attendance: 21,103; Referee: Alan Wiley

6 March 2002 30	Liverpool	3–0	Newcastle United	Liverpool
	Murphy 32', 53'; Hamann 75'	Report		Stadium: Anfield; Attendance: 44,204; Referee: Jeff Winter

16 March 2002 31	Middlesbrough	1–2	Liverpool	Middlesbrough
	Southgate 89'	Report	Heskey 33'; Riise 84'	Stadium: Riverside Stadium; Attendance: 31,253; Referee: Andy D'Urso

24 March 2002 32	Liverpool	1–0	Chelsea	Liverpool
	Šmicer 90'	Report		Stadium: Anfield; Attendance: 44,203; Referee: Mark Halsey

30 March 2002 33	Liverpool	2–0	Charlton Athletic	Liverpool
	Šmicer 23'; Owen 36'	Report		Stadium: Anfield; Attendance: 44,094; Referee: Dermot Gallagher

13 April 2002 34	Sunderland	0–1	Liverpool	Sunderland
	Reyna (red card)	Report	Owen 55'	Stadium: Stadium of Light; Attendance: 48,335; Referee: Dermot Gallagher

20 April 2002 35	Liverpool	2–0	Derby County	Liverpool
	Owen 16', 90'	Report		Stadium: Anfield; Attendance: 43,510; Referee: Mike Riley

27 April 2002 36	Tottenham Hotspur	1–0	Liverpool	London
	Poyet 41'	Report		Stadium: White Hart Lane; Attendance: 36,017; Referee: Peter Jones

8 May 2002 37	Liverpool	4–3	Blackburn Rovers	Liverpool
	Murphy 23'; Anelka 39'; Hyypiä 52'; Heskey 86'	Report	Duff 28'; Cole 49'; Jansen 80'	Stadium: Anfield; Attendance: 40,663; Referee: Alan Wiley

11 May 2002 38	Liverpool	5–0	Ipswich Town	Liverpool
	Riise 13', 35'; Owen 46'; Šmicer 57'; Anelka 88'	Report		Stadium: Anfield; Attendance: 44,088; Referee: Steve Dunn

=== FA Cup ===
==== Matches ====
5 January 2002 3	Liverpool	3–0	Birmingham City	Anfield, Liverpool
	Owen 17' 25'; Anelka 86'	Report		Attendance: 40,875; Referee: Mark Halsey

27 January 2002 4	Arsenal	1–0	Liverpool	Highbury, London
	Bergkamp 28', (red card) 71'; Keown (red card) 67'	Report	Carragher (red card) 72'	Attendance: 38,092; Referee: Mike Riley

=== League Cup ===
==== Matches ====
9 October 2001 3	Liverpool	1–2 (a.e.t.)	Grimsby Town	Anfield, Liverpool
	McAllister 101' (pen.)	Report	Broomes 113'; Jevons 120'	Attendance: 32,672; Referee: Eddie Wolstenholme

=== Champions League ===
==== Matches ====
8 August 2001 Q3	Haka (Finland)	0–5	(England) Liverpool	Helsinki Olympic Stadium, Helsinki
20:00 CET		UEFA report BBC report	Heskey 32'; Owen 55', 64', 87'; Hyypiä 86'	Attendance: 33,217; Referee: Arturo Daudén Ibañez (Spain)

21 August 2001 Q3	Liverpool (England)	4–1	(Finland) Haka	Anfield, Liverpool
	Fowler 37'; Redknapp 50'; Heskey 57'; David Wilson 83' (o.g.)	Report	Péter Kovács 45'	Attendance: 31,602; Referee: Terje Hauge (Norway)

11 September 2001 Group Stage 1	Liverpool (England)	1–1	(Portugal) Boavista	Anfield, Liverpool
20:45	Owen 29'	UEFA report BBC report	Silva 3'	Attendance: 30,015; Referee: Kyros Vassaras (Greece)

19 September 2001 Group Stage 1	Borussia Dortmund (Germany)	0–0	(England) Liverpool	Westfalenstadion, Dortmund
20:45		UEFA report BBC report		Attendance: 50,000; Referee: Valentin Ivanov (Russia)

26 September 2001 Group Stage 1	Liverpool (England)	1–0	(Ukraine) Dynamo Kyiv	Anfield, Liverpool
20:45	Litmanen 23'	UEFA report BBC report		Attendance: 33,513; Referee: Pierluigi Collina (Italy)

16 October 2001 Group Stage 1	Dynamo Kyiv (Ukraine)	1–2	(England) Liverpool	NSC Olympiyskiy Stadium, Kyiv
20:45	Ghioane 59'	UEFA report BBC report	Murphy 43'; Gerrard 67'	Attendance: 50,000; Referee: Claude Colombo (France)

24 October 2001 Group Stage 1	Boavista (Portugal)	1–1	(England) Liverpool	Bessa XXI, Porto
20:45	Silva 60'	UEFA report BBC report	Murphy 17'	Attendance: 12,000; Referee: Karl-Erik Nilsson (Sweden)

30 October 2001 Group Stage 1	Liverpool (England)	2–0	(Germany) Borussia Dortmund	Anfield, Liverpool
20:45	Šmicer 15'; Wright 82'	UEFA report BBC report		Attendance: 45,076; Referee: Kim Milton Nielsen (Denmark)

20 November 2001 Group Stage 2	Liverpool (England)	1–3	(Spain) Barcelona	Anfield, Liverpool
20:45	Owen 27'	UEFA report BBC report	Kluivert 41'; Rochemback 65'; Overmars 84'	Attendance: 45,000; Referee: Hellmut Krug (Germany)

5 December 2001 Group Stage 2	Roma (Italy)	0–0	(England) Liverpool	Stadio Olimpico, Rome
20:45		UEFA report BBC report		Attendance: 52,000; Referee: Dick Jol (Netherlands)

20 February 2002 Group Stage 2	Liverpool (England)	0–0	(Turkey) Galatasaray	Anfield, Liverpool
20:45		UEFA report BBC report		Attendance: 36,000; Referee: Vítor Melo Pereira (Portugal)

26 February 2002 Group Stage 2	Galatasaray (Turkey)	1–1	(England) Liverpool	Ali Sami Yen Stadium, Istanbul
20:45	Niculescu 71'	UEFA report BBC report	Heskey 79'	Attendance: 36,000; Referee: Urs Meier (Switzerland)

13 March 2002 Group Stage 2	Barcelona (Spain)	0–0	(England) Liverpool	Camp Nou, Barcelona
20:45		UEFA report BBC report		Attendance: 75,000; Referee: Kyros Vassaras (Greece)

19 March 2002 Group Stage 2	Liverpool (England)	2–0	(Italy) Roma	Anfield, Liverpool
20:45	Litmanen 7' (pen.); Heskey 64'	UEFA report BBC report		Attendance: 41,794; Referee: Rune Pedersen (Norway)

3 April 2002 QF	Liverpool (England)	1–0	(Germany) Bayer Leverkusen	Anfield, Liverpool
20:45	Hyypiä 44'	UEFA Report BBC report		Attendance: 42,500; Referee: Anders Frisk (Sweden)

9 April 2002 QF	Bayer Leverkusen (Germany)	4–2	(England) Liverpool	BayArena, Leverkusen
20:45	Ballack 16', 64'; Berbatov 68'; Lúcio 84'	UEFA Report BBC Report	Xavier 42'; Litmanen 79'	Attendance: 22,500; Referee: Vítor Melo Pereira (Portugal)
