= Toon Becx =

Dutch footballer (1920–2013)

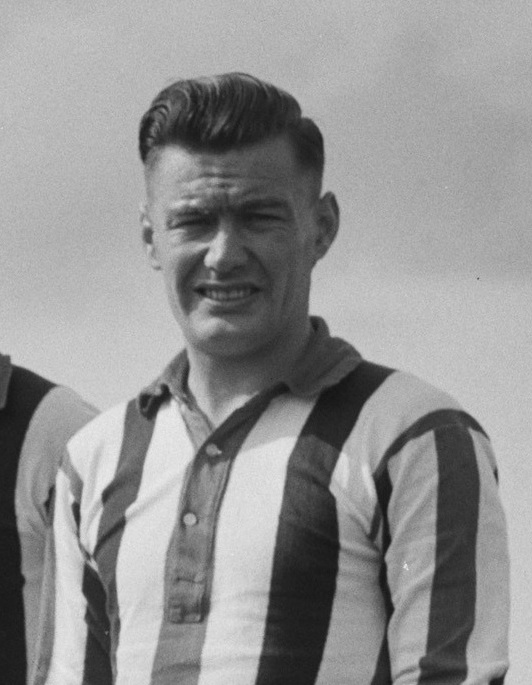
- Beckx in 1952

Personal information
- Full name: Antonius Wilhelmus Maria Becx
- Date of birth: 21 April 1920
- Place of birth: Netherlands
- Date of death: 26 November 2013 (aged 93)
- Place of death: Tilburg, North Brabant, Netherlands
- Position: Left winger

Senior career*
Years	Team	Apps	(Gls)
1939–1956	Willem II	329	(113)
- * Club domestic league appearances and goals

Antonius Wilhelmus Maria "Toon" Becx (21 April 1920 − 26 November 2013) was a Dutch footballer who played for Willem II, primarily as a left winger.

== Career ==
Known as a free-kick specialist with a fierce shot, Becx played his entire career for Willem II, scoring 113 goals in 329 matches. He made his debut in the 1939–40 season, won two Dutch league titles with them under Czech coach František Fadrhonc (the first Dutch professional league title in 1955) and formed a prolific strike force with Jan van Roessel and Piet de Jong.

== Personal life and death ==
During the Second World War Becx was forced to work in Germany.

He died on 26 November 2013, aged 93, in Tilburg, North Brabant.

== Honours ==
Willem II

- Netherlands Football League Championship: 1951–52, 1954–55
