= Jan van Roessel =

Dutch footballer (1925–2011)

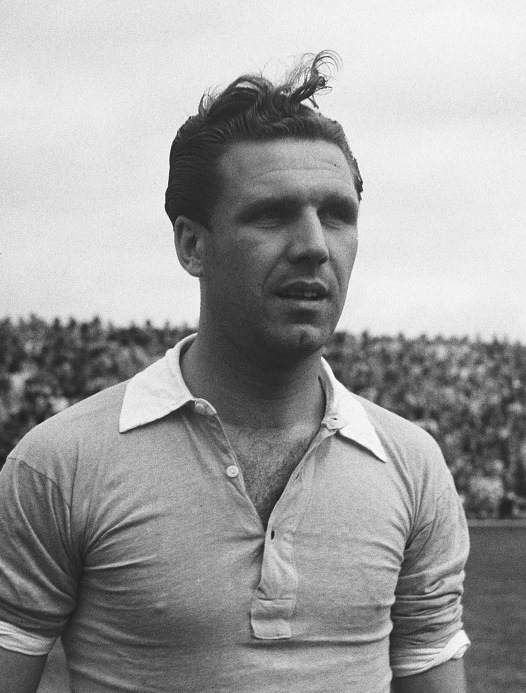
- van Roessel in 1952

Personal information
- Full name: Joannes Cornelis Christianus van Roessel
- Date of birth: 7 April 1925
- Place of birth: Tilburg, Netherlands
- Date of death: 3 June 2011 (aged 86)
- Place of death: Tilburg, Netherlands
- Position: Forward

Senior career*
Years	Team	Apps	(Gls)
- LONGA
1951–1957	Willem II	168	(152)
1957–1958	LONGA		

International career
1949–1955	Netherlands	6	(5)
- * Club domestic league appearances and goals

Jan van Roessel (7 April 1925 – 3 June 2011) was a Dutch footballer who played as a forward.

== Club career ==
A big forward and fierce header of the ball, Van Roessel was picked up at LONGA by local rivals Willem II in Tilburg in 1951, and won the 1952 Dutch (then still amateur) league title and in 1955 the first professional Eredivisie championship. He formed a potent strike force with Toon Becx and Piet de Jong and was reportedly linked to neighbours PSV Eindhoven and some Italian clubs, most notably Sampdoria and Torino, but Czech coach František Fadrhonc convinced him to stay in Tilburg.

Van Roessel was named Player of the Century of Willem II.

== International career ==
Van Roessel made his debut for the Netherlands in a June 1949 friendly match against Finland and had earned a total of six caps, scoring five goals. He represented his country at the 1952 Summer Olympics, where he scored against Brazil.

His final international was a May 1955 friendly match against Switzerland.

== Personal life and death ==
Van Roessel married Louisa van Laarhoven in 1956 and the couple had one daughter, who died of leukemia in 1988. In his later years, he suffered from Alzheimer's disease. Van Roessel died on 3 June 2011 of a lung disease at the age of 86.

== Career statistics ==
Scores and results list Holland's goal tally first.

#	Date	Venue	Opponent	Score	Result	Competition
1	16 June 1949	Olympic Stadium, Helsinki, Finland	Finland	1–0	4–1	Friendly
2	16 June 1949	Olympic Stadium, Helsinki, Finland	Finland	3–0	4–1	Friendly
3	16 July 1952	Kupittaa, Turku, Finland	Brazil	1–0	1–5	1952 Summer Olympics
4	21 September 1952	Idraetsparken, Copenhagen, Denmark	Denmark	1–0	2–3	Friendly
5	15 November 1952	Boothferry Park, Hull, England	England Amateurs	1–0	2–2	Friendly

== Honours ==
Willem II

- Netherlands Football League Championship: 1951–52, 1954–55
