= James Vaughan (footballer, born 1986) =

English footballer

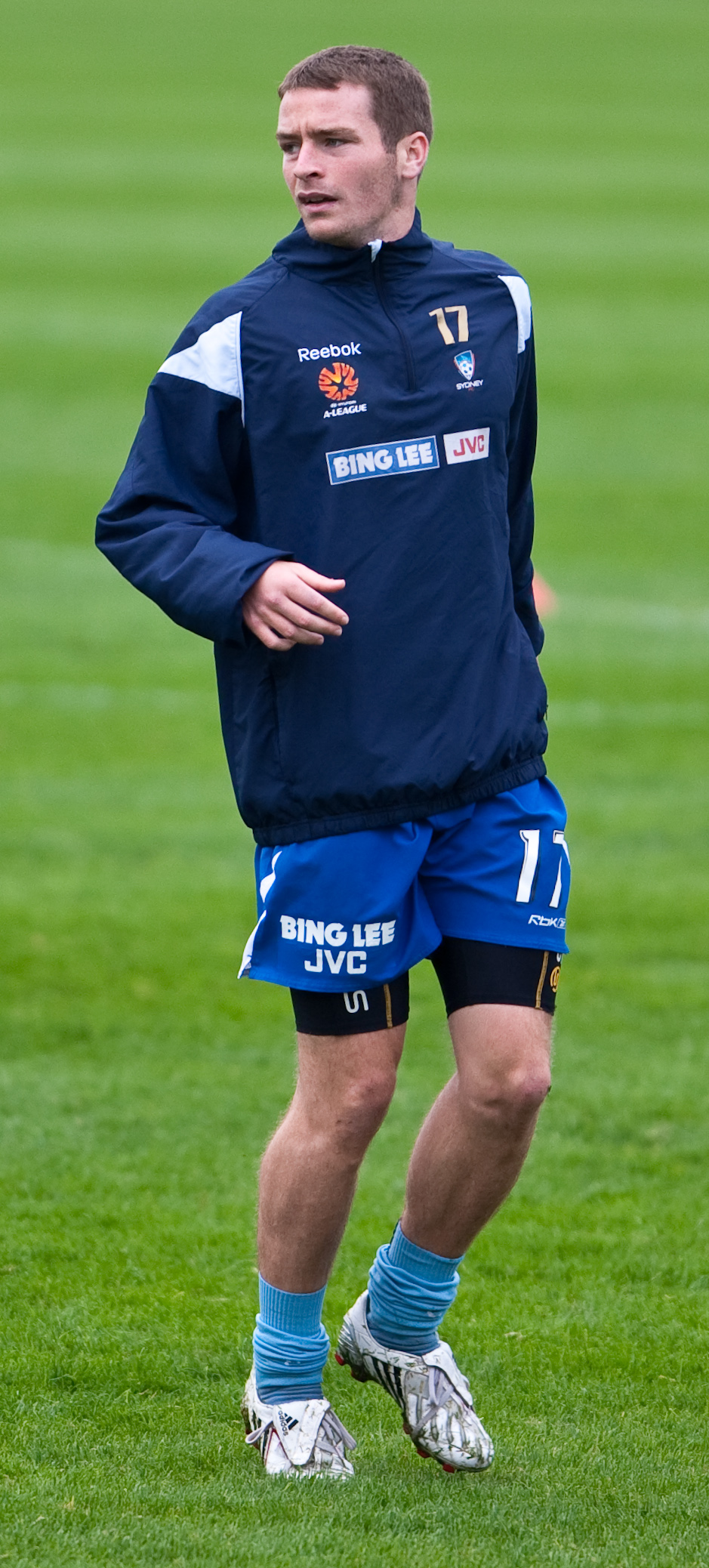

Personal information
- Full name: James Vaughan
- Date of birth: 6 December 1986 (age 39)
- Place of birth: Liverpool, England
- Position: Defender

Senior career*
Years	Team	Apps	(Gls)
2004–2006	Tranmere Rovers	0	(0)
2006–2009	Chester City	76	(0)
2006–2007	→ Droylsden (loan)	8	(0)
2009	Wollongong Community FC	7	(0)
2009–2012	Droylsden	18	(0)
- * Club domestic league appearances and goals as of 16:33, 20 May 2009 (UTC)

James Vaughan (born 6 December 1986) is an English former footballer who played as a right-back or left-back.

== Career ==
Born in Liverpool, Vaughan was signed by Chester in January 2006 from Tranmere Rovers, where he made more than 50 reserve team appearances. He joined his father Stephen Vaughan, Sr. (owner) and his brother, Stephen Vaughan at the club. His first-team debut came when he replaced his brother in the closing stages of Chester's 4–4 draw in the EFL Trophy at Chesterfield on 29 November 2006.

After a successful loan spell at Droylsden, who he helped win the Conference North title, Vaughan returned to Chester and was a regular in the closing matches of the 2006–07.

Vaughan was given squad number 22 for 2007–08 and commanded a regular spot as first-choice right back for the next two seasons the English Football League. In April 2009, Vaughan moved to Australia and joined Wollongong for who he played seven games. Whilst in Australia he played a further two games with A-League side Sydney FC, and one game for A-League side Central Coast Mariners. Despite looking promising at the back, he was not offered a contract due to visa restrictions. Upon his return to the UK, he has been linked with a move to League One side Oldham Athletic.

On 24 October, Vaughan dropped into non league football signing a 2-year contract at Droylsden FC.
