= Administration (British football) =

Procedure for insolvent football clubs

In the United Kingdom, football clubs sometimes choose to enter administration (sanction) when they are unable to pay off outstanding debts. Under the Insolvency Act 1986, a business will face a winding-up order bringing them to court and if it is shown that a business cannot pay debts as they fall due or cannot repay outstanding debts then the company will be classified as insolvent. Administration puts accountants "in charge of pretty much everything apart from coaching the players and picking the team". For a football club in administration, the "football creditors rule" requires football-related debts such as wages owed to players and staff, and transfer fees owed to other clubs to be paid first.

== England and Wales ==
In 2000, ITV Digital bought the broadcasting rights to Football League and League Cup matches in a three-year, £315m deal. In March 2002, the company went bankrupt owing the League £180 million which it said it "cannot afford to pay". Because of this, many Football League clubs had financial problems and entered administration.

Before the implementation of a points deduction it was perceived that clubs had "manipulated and abused [administration] as a way of shedding debts then restructuring, and borrowing again once the hapless creditors had been fobbed off with their 8p in the pound". In September 2003, it was proposed that clubs entering administration would be docked 10 points. A 'fit and proper persons' test was also introduced in an attempt to prevent fraudulent activities. If a person was previously director at a club which was in "administration twice during a five-year period" or at "two different clubs that have each gone into administration in a five-year period" then they would be prevented from becoming the controlling shareholder of a Football League club. A 'fit and proper persons' test was also introduced for directors of Premier League clubs. In November 2009, Stephen Vaughan, Sr. became the first director to fail the 'fit and proper persons' test.

To ease financial problems for clubs that had been relegated, "parachute payments" were introduced to give time to adapt to the financial gulf between divisions. The deductions of 10 points in the Football League and 9 points in the Premier League were ratified in 2004, with the rule in place from the start of the 2004–05 season. The League also adopted rules that prevented any side from being in administration for either two successive seasons or eighteen consecutive months. The reason for the deduction being a point less in the Premier League was that the teams play eight fewer fixtures than Football League clubs. The first club to incur this new penalty were League One side Wrexham F.C. who entered administration on 3 December 2004.

Leeds United filed for administration with only a few days remaining in the 2006–07 season, which automatically triggered a 10-point penalty. This placed Leeds at the bottom of the table and relegated the club, but they were extremely likely to have been relegated anyway. By entering administration during the 2006–07 season, they hoped to avoid starting the 2007–08 season on −10 points. The following week, Boston United entered administration in the final minutes of a defeat to Wrexham which ensured they were relegated to the Football Conference, meaning they likewise avoided starting the following season on -10 points (though they would find themselves being double-relegated to the Conference North for unrelated reasons). The Football League saw both cases as clubs trying to exploit a loophole, and changed the rules. From 2007–08, any club entering administration after the fourth Thursday in March would have their 10-point deduction suspended until the following season. If the club is relegated the points will be deducted from their tally at the start of next season. If the club stays up the 10 points will be taken off their final total.

On 26 February 2010, Portsmouth became the first Premier League club to enter administration.

=== Football creditors rule ===
In a situation of insolvency, the "football creditors rule" means that debts to other clubs or players are prioritised and must be paid in full before the club is eligible to compete again in the league. The Enterprise Act 2002 made reforms to the insolvency act and, from 15 September 2003, the altered procedures for administration were implemented. Most notably it abolished the Crown's preferential right to recover unpaid taxes ahead of other creditors. As such, HM Revenue and Customs (HMRC) is now often not paid in full (between 2003 and 2010, outstanding unpaid taxes to the HMRC amounted to £30 million). This legality of the football creditors rule was challenged in 2004 in Inland Revenue Commissioners v The Wimbledon Football Club Ltd. However, it was found that "full payment to football creditors (out of third party funds) ahead of preferential creditors did not infringe the provisions of section s4(4)(a) of the Act" and "differential treatment may be necessary to secure the continuation of the company's business and may be regarded as supportable".

In 2011 HMRC brought another challenge to the football creditors rule in the High Court, this time on the basis that it breached fundamental principles of insolvency law, including the pari passu rule that all unsecured creditors should be paid on a proportionate basis. However, in May 2012 the court rejected the challenge as it found that the rule was not a deliberate evasion of insolvency law.

=== List of clubs in England and Wales that have entered administration or CVA ===
Club	Entered administration/CVA	Exited administration/CVA	League(s)	Deduction(s)
Bradford City	1983	1983 (Old company dissolved)	Third Division	None
Charlton Athletic	February 1984	March 1984 (Note: Charlton was reformed under Charlton Athletic (1984) Ltd.) (Old company dissolved)	Second Division	None
Chelsea	August 1992 (Old company dissolved)	Administrative Receiver appointed: 14 May 1993	Premier League	None
Middlesbrough	21 May 1986	July 1986 (Note: Middlesbrough was reformed under Middlesbrough Football & Athletic Company (1986) Ltd.) (Old company dissolved)	Third Division	None
Tranmere Rovers	1987	1987	Fourth Division	None
Newport County	1989	February 1989; Dissolved	Football Conference	None
Walsall	1990	−	−	None
Northampton Town	1992	−	−	None
Kettering Town	1992	−	−	None
Aldershot	1992	−	−	None
Maidstone United	1992	−	−	None
Hartlepool United	1994	−	−	None
Barnet	1994	−	−	None
Exeter City	1994	−	−	None
Gillingham	1995	−	−	None
Doncaster Rovers	1997	−	−	None
Millwall	21 January 1997	June 1997 (Old company dissolved)	Second Division	None
Bournemouth	1997	−	−	None
Crystal Palace	1998	July 2000	Second Division	None
Chester City	October 1998	July 1999	Third Division	None
Portsmouth	1998	1999	Second Division	None
Hull City	7 February 2001	12 March 2001 (Note: Hull were renamed under Hull City AFC (Tigers) Ltd.)	Third Division	None
Queens Park Rangers	2 April 2001	17 November 2002	First Division	None
Bury	1 March 2002	−	Second Division; Third Division	None
Halifax Town	9 April 2002	March 2003	Third Division; Football Conference	None
Bradford City	16 May 2002	1 August 2002	First Division	None
Notts County	June 2002	December 2003 (Old company dissolved)	Third Division	None
Barnsley	3 October 2002	25 October 2003	Second Division	None
Leicester City	21 October 2002	16 November 2004 (Old company in liquidation)	First Division	None
Port Vale	16 December 2002	2003 (Old company dissolved)	Second Division	None
York City	18 December 2002	26 March 2003 (Old company dissolved)	Third Division	None
Luton Town	2003	2003	Second Division	None
Derby County	20 October 2003	20 October 2003	Championship	None (Note: Derby County Football Club did not enter administration itself but holding company, "Derby County PLC", did enter administrative receivership. The company was almost instantly taken over by newly formed company, Sharmine Limited.)
Ipswich Town (Note: Ipswich Town only entered temporary administration, this allowed existing club management to stay in place while finances were being restructured.)	10 February 2003	30 May 2003	First Division	None
Wimbledon	5 June 2003	21 June 2004 (As MK Dons)	First Division	None
Oldham Athletic	August 2003	26 May 2004 (Old company dissolved)	Second Division	None
Darlington	23 December 2003	26 May 2004	Third Division	None
Bradford City	27 February 2004	10 December 2004 (Old company dissolved)	First Division; League One	None
Wrexham	3 December 2004	3 August 2006	League One; League Two	−10 pts
Cambridge United	29 April 2005	22 July 2005	League Two	−10 pts
Rotherham United	13 May 2006	???	League One	−10 pts
Crawley Town	5 June 2006	10 August 2007	Conference National	−6 pts (Note: The Conference had no policy of automatic points deductions but, having failed to confirm payment of the previous season's CVA, the club were docked 6 points prior to the 2007–08 season for "bringing the Blue Square League into disrepute".)
Boston United	25 April 2007	20 May 2008	League Two	−10 pts (Note: Due to Boston United's financial problems they were not placed in the Conference National when they were relegated but demoted straight to the Conference North.)
Leeds United	4 May 2007	11 July 2007 (Old company dissolved)	Championship; League One	−10 pts −15 pts (Note: Leeds United were originally deducted 10 pts, but they were deducted 15 pts for not exiting administration via a Company Voluntary Arrangement.)
Luton Town	22 November 2007	28 July 2008 (Old company dissolved)	League One; League Two	−10 pts −20 pts (Note: Luton Town were docked 10 points in the 2007–08 League One season. Unable to agree to a CVA and exit administration, Luton were docked a further 20 points at the start of the 2008–09 League Two season (this was in addition to 10 more points deducted for misconduct).)
Bournemouth	8 February 2008	18 July 2008 (Old company dissolved)	League One; League Two	−10 pts −17 pts (Note: Bournemouth were originally deducted 10 pts for the 2007–08 season. Having failed to exit administration or to agree to a CVA before the start of the 2008–09 season, they started that side with −17 points.)
Rotherham United	18 March 2008	2008 (Old company dissolved)	League Two	−10 pts −17 pts (Note: Rotherham were originally deducted 10 pts for the 2007–08 season. Having failed to exit administration or to agree to a CVA before the start of the 2008–09 season, they started that side with −17 points.)
Halifax Town	26 March 2008	13 June 2008	Conference National	−10 pts
Darlington	25 February 2009	7 August 2009	League Two	−10 pts
Southampton	2 April 2009	8 July 2009	Championship; League One	N/A −10 pts (Note: Southampton were deducted 10 pts when it was found that the football club was "inextricably linked as one economic entity" to the holding company Southampton Leisure Holdings PLC which had gone into administration on 2 April 2009. As Southampton were relegated in the 2008–09 Championship season the points were deducted at the start of the 2009–10 League One season.)
Stockport County	30 April 2009	18 June 2010	League One	−10 pts
Chester City	17 May 2009	10 March 2010 (Note: As Chester City were expelled from the Football Conference on 26 February 2010 having breached five Conference rules. On 8 March 2010 their results were expunged and on 10 March 2010 the club was wound-up at the High Court.); Dissolved	Conference National	−25 pts (Note: Chester City entered administration just weeks after they were relegated in the 2008–09 League Two season. The club were therefore docked 25 points at the start of the 2009–10 Conference National season: the automatic 10-point deduction and a further 15-point deduction due to investigations of financial irregularities by owner Stephen Vaughan, Sr.)
Northwich Victoria	15 May 2009	16 May 2010 (Note: Northwich Victoria Football Club (2004) Ltd. was renamed Northwich Victoria Football Club (2007) Ltd.)	Conference National	−10 pts (Note: Northwich Victoria were initially subject to the automatic 10-point deduction. Furthermore, because they came out of administration "without paying its creditors (including but not limited to football creditors) in full", they were expelled from the Conference and placed in the Northern Premier League Premier Division.)
Farsley Celtic	30 June 2009	10 March 2010; Dissolved	Conference North	−10 pts
Salisbury City	3 September 2009	26 February 2010	Conference National	−10 pts (Note: Salisbury City were initially subject to the automatic 10-point deduction. Furthermore, they failed to "pay all creditors in full by the second Saturday in May" which carried a two division demotion placing them in the Southern Football League Premier Division.)
Weymouth	28 October 2009	27 November 2009	Conference South	None
Crystal Palace	26 January 2010	20 August 2010 (Old company dissolved)	Championship	−10 pts
Portsmouth	26 February 2010	24 October 2010 (Old company dissolved)	Premier League	−9 pts
Plymouth Argyle	4 March 2011	31 October 2011 (Old company dissolved)	League One	−10 pts
Rushden and Diamonds	7 July 2011	8 July 2011; Dissolved	Conference National	None
Darlington	3 January 2012	21 June 2012; Dissolved	Conference National	−10 pts
Portsmouth	17 February 2012	19 April 2013 (Old company dissolved)	Championship	−10 pts
Port Vale	9 March 2012	20 November 2012 (Old company dissolved)	League Two	−10 pts
Coventry City	21 March 2013	14 June 2013 (Old company dissolved)	League One; League One	−10 pts −10 pts
Aldershot Town	2 May 2013	31 July 2014 (Old company dissolved)	League Two; Conference National	N/A -10 pts
Bolton Wanderers	13 May 2019	28 August 2019 (Old company in liquidation)	Championship; League One	N/A −12 pts
Bury	18 July 2019	CVA terminated on 9 March 2020; new CVA sought.	League One	−12 pts
Rhyl	27 April 2020	27 April 2020; Dissolved	Cymru North	None (Note: All results expunged due to Rhyl dissolving)
Wigan Athletic	1 July 2020	30 March 2021 (Old company in liquidation)	Championship; League One	−12 pts N/A
Bury	27 November 2020	18 February 2022	N/A	N/A
Derby County	22 September 2021	1 July 2022	Championship	−12 pts
Torquay United	5 April 2024	31 May 2024	National League South	−10 pts
Sheffield Wednesday	24 October 2025	2 May 2026	Championship	–12 pts
Farsley Celtic	18 December 2025	18 December 2025 (liquidated; phoenix club FC Farsley was created)	N/A	N/A
Harlow Town	9 January 2026	20 April 2026	Spartan South Midlands League Premier Division	–10 pts

=== Company voluntary arrangement ===
Football clubs may also negotiate a Company voluntary arrangement (CVA). While not strictly the same as administration, the EFL regards a CVA as an insolvency event and imposes a 12-points deduction. Debts to football creditors also need to be settled in full, if league membership is to be retained. In July 2019, Bury owner Steve Dale agreed a CVA with creditors to avoid the club going into administration; the club were deducted 12 points ahead of the 2019–20 season, but Dale's failure to provide the EFL with full details of the CVA led to Bury's opening fixtures being suspended ahead of a possible expulsion from the League. On 27 August 2019, the EFL announced that Bury's membership of the league had been withdrawn. On 27 November 2020, Dale placed the club into administration.

== Scotland ==
Following the adoption of a points sanction in the English Football League, a similar rule was proposed for adoption by the Scottish Premier League (SPL) in December 2003. It was announced in January 2004 that SPL clubs going into administration in the 2004–05 season would be subject to a 10-point deduction and be prevented from signing new players. With Motherwell and Dundee already in administration at the time, it was decided that if "they are not in the process of coming out of administration by 31 May", the deduction would be applied at the start of the following season. Furthermore, the Scottish Football Association would not allow clubs in administration to play in European competition. Both Motherwell and Dundee met the required conditions to avoid the deduction of points. The 10-point penalty was subsequently applied to Gretna in the 2007–08 season and Rangers in 2011–12.

Although the Scottish Football League (SFL) had no automatic deduction of points for clubs going into administration, it reserved the right to "deduct championship points before or during a season and/or to impose a player registration embargo on any club". This meant that its penalties for insolvency varied; Dundee were docked 25 points in the 2010–11 season because it was the second time they had entered administration in a relatively short period. The SFL also had the power to place a team in the bottom tier (Third Division) if there were any doubts that the club could fulfill their fixtures for the forthcoming season.

The administration and liquidation of The Rangers Football Club Plc prompted much discussion in Scotland about what sanctions (if any) are appropriate for an insolvent club. When Rangers entered administration in February 2012, the club was docked 10 points in the 2011–12 Scottish Premier League. The SPL clubs agreed to amend the penalty for administration to the greater of 10 points or one third of the club's tally in the previous season. Rangers attempted to agree a CVA with its creditors, but this offer was rejected by HMRC in June 2012. The business and assets of Rangers were instead sold to a new company. One of Rangers' assets was its membership of the SPL, but this could not be transferred without the approval of the other SPL clubs. Rangers' application for transfer was rejected by a 10–1 majority. The SPL attempted to negotiate a deal with the SFL whereby Rangers would enter the First Division (second tier). This was rejected by SFL clubs, who instead voted for Rangers to be granted associate membership of the SFL and a place in the Third Division (fourth tier).

When the SPL and SFL merged to form the Scottish Professional Football League (SPFL) in 2013, the penalty for entering administration was standardised as 15 points. Hearts entered administration days before the leagues merged and were docked 15 points for the 2013–14 season under the old SPL rules, as they had earned 44 points in the 2012–13 season.

=== List of clubs in Scotland that have entered administration ===
Club	Entered administration	Exited administration	League(s)	Deduction(s) and/or other sanctions
Queen's Park	10 January 2000	3 April 2000	Third Division	None
Greenock Morton	15 December 2000	8 August 2001	First Division	None
Clydebank	23 December 2000	9 July 2002; Became Airdrie United	Second Division	None
Airdrieonians		21 May 2002; Dissolved	First Division	None
Motherwell	24 April 2002	20 April 2004	SPL	None
Dundee	25 November 2003	6 August 2004	SPL	None
Livingston	3 February 2004	13 May 2005	SPL	None
Gretna	10 March 2008	8 August 2008; Dissolved	SPL	−10 pts Demoted to Third Division
Livingston	24 July 2009	13 August 2009	First Division	Demoted to Third Division
Dundee	14 October 2010	12 May 2011	First Division	−25 pts
Rangers	14 February 2012	14 June 2012 (old company in liquidation)	SPL	−10 pts After the business and assets of Rangers were sold to a new company, the SPL member clubs refused an application for the Rangers SPL membership share to also be transferred to the new Rangers company. Rangers were instead accepted into the Third Division (fourth tier) for the 2012–13 season.
Dunfermline Athletic	27 March 2013	13 December 2013	First Division	−15 pts
Heart of Midlothian	19 June 2013	11 June 2014	SPL	−15 pts
Inverness Caledonian Thistle	22 October 2024	5 June 2025	League One	−15 pts, additional −5 pts at start of following season
Dumbarton	18 November 2024	12 June 2025 (old company dissolved)	League One	−15 pts, additional −5 pts at start of following season Original company dissolved, replaced by new company, retained SPFL membership.

== Clubs in other sports that have entered administration ==
Club	Entered administration	Exited administration	Sport	League(s)	Deduction(s)
Crusaders RL	12 November 2010	27 December 2010	Rugby League	Super League	−4 pts
Wakefield Trinity	1 December 2010	17 February 2011	Rugby League	Super League	−4 pts
Featherstone Rovers	15 December 2025		Rugby League	Championship	Denied a licence for the 2026 Championship
