= Promes =

Promes is a surname. Notable people with the surname include:

- Jerold Promes (born 1984), Dutch footballer
- Marino Promes (born 1977), Dutch footballer
- Quincy Promes (born 1992), Dutch footballer
