= Yassine Abdellaoui =

Dutch footballer

Personal information
- Date of birth: 21 June 1975 (age 51)
- Place of birth: Den Bosch, Netherlands
- Height: 1.80 m (5 ft 11 in)
- Position: Midfielder

Youth career
- OJC Rosmalen

Senior career*
Years	Team	Apps	(Gls)
1992–1994	Willem II	47	(3)
1994–1996	NAC Breda	68	(12)
1997	Rayo	24	(0)
1998	NEC	6	(0)
1998–2002	Willem II	87	(11)
2002–2003	NAC Breda	9	(0)
2003–2004	De Graafschap	7	(0)
Total		248	(26)
- * Club domestic league appearances and goals

Yassine Abdellaoui (born 21 June 1975) is a Dutch former professional footballer who played as a midfielder.

== Career ==
Born in Den Bosch, Abdellaoui played for OJC Rosmalen, Willem II, NAC Breda, Rayo, NEC and De Graafschap.

After retiring as a player in 2004, he worked as a coach, and in August 2016 was working with the Willem II youth team.

== Personal life ==
Abdellaoui is of Moroccan descent.

In 2003, he was arrested on accusation of tax fraud. In 2015, he was acquitted of money laundering charges. In 2019, he was shot and wounded in Amsterdam.
