= Fit-and-proper-person test =

British trustworthiness test

The fit-and-proper-person test or director's test is a test aiming to prevent corrupt or untrustworthy people from serving on the board of certain organizations. First introduced in 2004 for owners and directors of major British football clubs, since November 2014 it also applies to the National Health Service in England for board members of NHS Trusts under the Health and Social Care Act 2008 (Regulated Activities) Regulations 2014. The Health and Social Care Act 2008 (Regulated Activities) Regulations 2014, s.19 also extends the test to any person employed for the purposes of any regulated activity (doctor, nurse, social worker etc), and the Housing Act 2004, s.64 and s.88, apply fit and proper person tests to the conditions for granted licences to landlords of Houses in Multiple Occupation (HMOs) and/or houses which are subject to selective licensing. The Office for Students' Regulatory framework for higher education in England applies the fit and proper person test to "members of the governing body, those with senior management responsibilities, and individuals exercising control or significant influence over the provider" at higher education providers in England as one of its public interest governing principles. Irish legislation on waste collection permits incorporates a fit and proper person test.

== Application to the National Health Service ==
Directors of NHS Trusts can be deemed unfit if they have been involved in “serious misconduct or mismanagement”. The test is supervised by the Care Quality Commission but decisions are made by individual trusts.

A Trust must be satisfied that its directors are:

- of good character - consideration must be given to previous convictions and removal from a professional register when assessing this;
- and have the qualifications, competence, skills and experience necessary for their office;
- and are capable (once reasonable adjustments have been made) of performing tasks intrinsic to their job by reason of their health.

A trust must not “appoint or have in place” a director who has been responsible for, privy to, contributed to or facilitated any serious misconduct or mismanagement (whether unlawful or not) in the course of carrying on a regulated activity.

The CQC received referrals from campaigners and whistleblowers in January 2015 which alleged that more than 20 current and former NHS chief executives, medical directors and senior board level executives were unfit for their roles.

In 2018 the Health Minister commissioned a review of the test which was conducted by Tom Kark QC, who made seven recommendations to strengthen it and make it applicable throughout the NHS. Among his recommendations were: to devise a set of competencies for directors to meet and be benchmarked against; to set up a central database to hold information about directors; to require full references for each director (a mandatory reference scheme) and to set up a Health Directors Standards Council to investigate and deal with serious misconduct by senior directors. The first two recommendations were accepted by Government, the rest are under review.

== Application in football ==
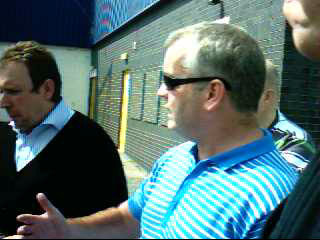
Stephen Vaughan fell foul of the test

The test, introduced in 2004, is mandated by the Premier League, the Football League, the National League and the Scottish Premier League. Anybody who takes over a club, runs one, or owns over 30% of its shares must be assessed. The first director known to have failed the test was Dennis Coleman, director of Rotherham United when they went into administration in 2006 and 2008. He claimed:

"I came in and in effect saved the club. It is totally unfair for me to be disqualified."

In November 2009, Stephen Vaughan, then owner of Chester City, became the first owner to fail the test, after he was legally disqualified from being a director of any company. This was a result of VAT fraud as owner of Widnes Vikings rugby club. He transferred control of Chester to his son, Stephen Vaughan, Jr.

In March 2012, Rangers owner Craig Whyte was found not to be a fit and proper person as the result of an independent enquiry.

In June 2014, Louis Tomlinson, former footballer and member of the boy band One Direction, and John Ryan, businessman and previous Chairman of Doncaster Rovers, launched a bid to buy the club but one month later Ryan was found not to be a fit and proper person due to a lack of funding.

=== Disqualifying events ===
The Premier League has tighter restrictions than the Football League or National League. In general, a businessman will fail the test if:

- They have power or influence over another Football League club
- They hold a significant interest in another Football League club
- They become prohibited by law from being a director
- They are filing for bankruptcy
- They have been director of a club while it has suffered two or more unconnected events of insolvency
- They have been a director of two or more clubs of which, while they have been director, has suffered an event of insolvency

== Sources ==
Websites

- Conn, David (7 October 2009). "What is the 'fit and proper person test'?". The Guardian.
- "A fit and proper Premiership?". BBC. 31 July 2007.
