= Sami Hyypiä =

Finnish football manager (born 1973)

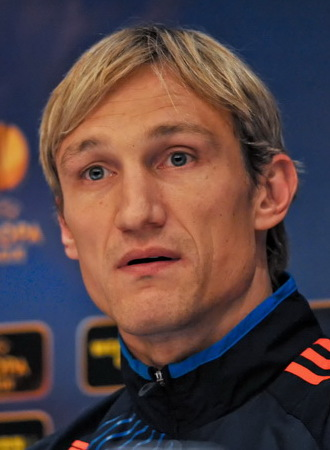
- Hyypiä with Bayer Leverkusen in 2012

Personal information
- Full name: Sami Tuomas Hyypiä
- Date of birth: 7 October 1973 (age 53)
- Place of birth: Porvoo, Finland
- Height: 1.93 m (6 ft 4 in)
- Position: Centre-back

Youth career
- 1977–1988: Kumu

Senior career*
Years	Team	Apps	(Gls)
1989	PaPe	3	(0)
1990–1991	Kumu	19	(0)
1992–1995	MyPa	96	(8)
1995–1999	Willem II	100	(3)
1999–2009	Liverpool	318	(22)
2009–2011	Bayer Leverkusen	53	(3)
Total		589	(36)

International career
1989–1992	Finland U21	27	(3)
1992–2010	Finland	105	(5)

Managerial career
- 2011–2012: Finland (assistant)
- 2012–2014: Bayer Leverkusen
- 2014: Brighton & Hove Albion
- 2015–2016: Zürich
- 2020: Haka (assistant)
- * Club domestic league appearances and goals

Sami Tuomas Hyypiä (Finnish pronunciation: [ˈsɑmi ˈhyːpiæ]; born 7 October 1973) is a Finnish professional football manager and a former player who played as a centre-back.

Hyypiä began his playing career with Ykkönen side Kumu and soon moved to Veikkausliiga outfit MyPa. He spent four years at the club, helping them win the Finnish Cup in 1992 and 1995. He moved to Willem II in 1995 and spent the next four years there. He became the team captain and was nominated their player of the year after helping them qualify for the UEFA Champions League.

In 1999, he moved to Liverpool, the team he supported as a child, in a deal worth £2.6 million. He quickly established himself in the first team, partnering Stéphane Henchoz in defence. By 2001, he regularly captained the team and that season Liverpool won a slew of honours, completing a cup treble of the League Cup, FA Cup and UEFA Cup, in addition to winning the UEFA Super Cup and FA Community Shield. He became first choice captain in the 2001–02 season and was part of the Football League Cup-winning team in 2003. Steven Gerrard superseded him as captain in 2003, but Hyypiä still occasionally captained the side in his absence. Hyypiä won his highest football honour in 2005 as part of Liverpool's victorious 2004–05 Champions League campaign, where his defensive partnership with Jamie Carragher helped them win in the final. During his ten years in Merseyside, he became a fan favourite and remains a popular figure at the club. From 2009 to 2011, Hyypiä played for German Bundesliga side Bayer Leverkusen, where he retired as a player in 2011.

Hyypiä was a prominent figure in the Finland national team and was selected as the Finnish Sports' Journalists and Football Association Player of the Year numerous times. He made his debut in 1992 and, with 105 caps before retiring in 2010, is the country's third most capped Finnish player after Jari Litmanen and Teemu Pukki.

From the 2012–13 season, he returned to Bayer Leverkusen as its full team manager. After two successful seasons in the Bundesliga, he returned to English football in 2014 for a brief spell as manager of now Premier League club Brighton & Hove Albion. From August 2015 to May 2016, he was manager of Swiss club Zürich.

Hyypiä was named in the Finnish Sports Hall of Fame in 2024.

== Early life ==
Hyypiä was born in Porvoo and raised in Kuusankoski, Finland, 100 miles (160 km) north-east of Helsinki, the son of Irma and Jouko Hyypiä. Hyypiä's parents were both footballers – his father Jouko played for Finnish team Pallo Peikot, while his mother played as an amateur goalkeeper. Although the young Sami played ice hockey, one of the more popular sports in Finland, his parents' influence was important in him choosing a career in football; he later commented, "I guess there was only one career option for me."

== Club career ==
=== Early career ===
Hyypiä started his career with Pallo-Peikot, where he played every position except his final position of defender and KuMu, before joining Veikkausliiga club MyPa for the 1992 season. He won the Finnish Cup with MyPa in 1992, when Jari Litmanen was one of his teammates, and again in 1995.

In 1995, at the age of 22, he went for a trial at Newcastle United, his first taste of English football. Hyypiä said: "They [Newcastle] certainly helped my career. I had a two-week trial in 1995 under Kevin Keegan and it gave me an insight into English football. I was a young player in Finland and I didn't really expect it to lead to anything. I just went for the experience, but it was good experience and I enjoyed my time there. It helped me a lot at the time to see a big English club at close hand and I always look forward to going back."

=== Willem II ===
Later that year, Hyypiä joined Dutch club Willem II and spent four years with the Eredivisie team, soon becoming a favourite with the fans and winning their player of the year award in his final season. Hyypiä captained the side to qualification for the UEFA Champions League, thus earning a place in the hearts of supporters although he would not be taking part in the campaign.

=== Liverpool ===
In May 1999, Hyypiä was signed by Liverpool, the team he supported as a boy, for £2.6 million, having been recommended to former chief executive Peter Robinson by a TV cameraman. Initially, Hyypiä was regarded as an unknown who would not live up to expectations, but this preconception was dismissed when he immediately formed a successful central defensive partnership with fellow arrival Stéphane Henchoz. Almost ten years later in a farewell tribute to Hyypiä, Ron Yeats, then the chief scout for Liverpool, commented that the deal was "one of the best bits of business we've done over the years... a steal – a bargain..." Fourteen years on, Hyypiä himself told the BBC that joining Liverpool was a dream come true. In the 2000–01 season, Hyypiä shared the captaincy of Liverpool with Robbie Fowler while Jamie Redknapp, the full-time captain, was suffering from a long-term injury. During that season, Hyypiä and Fowler led the team to a cup treble: the Football League Cup, FA Cup and UEFA Cup. He also went on to claim a "treble" of three consecutive FAF Finnish Footballer of the Year awards from 2001 to 2003.

In April 2002, Hyypiä became first choice Liverpool captain after Redknapp, who had been blighted by long-term injuries, and Fowler both left the club. However, after such a bright start to his Liverpool career came a relative lull and in October 2003, Hyypiä was replaced as Liverpool captain by Steven Gerrard. With some of the pressure lifted, his performances generally improved.

On 5 April 2003, Hyypiä received a red card against Manchester United, the only red of his club career. "[Ruud] Van Nistelrooy was going through and maybe I took his shirt a little bit. The referee thought so. I got a straight red card. They got a penalty. It was an agony to watch the game in the dressing room. The only red card of my career. You remember that sort of thing."

In 2004, new Liverpool manager Rafael Benítez moved Jamie Carragher from fullback to partner Hyypiä in central defence. This seemingly reinvigorated Hyypiä and the team went on to have a successful season, winning the 2004–05 Champions League on the back of their solid defence. On 10 August 2005, it was reported that Hyypiä had agreed to a new three-year contract after weeks of talks with the Reds which would keep him at Anfield until 2008.

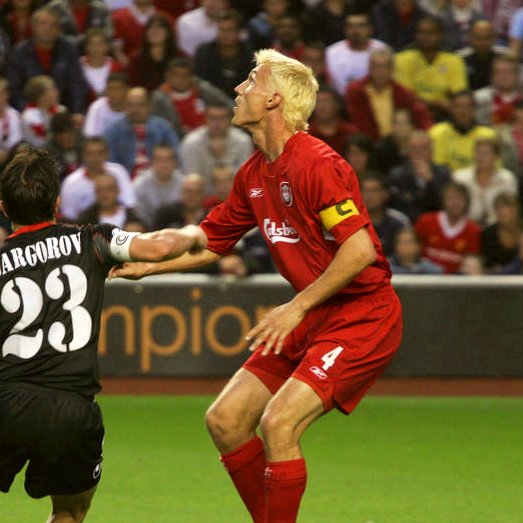
Hyypiä playing for Liverpool in 2005

During the 2005–06 season, Hyypiä was relegated to third-choice captain after Jamie Carragher's ascent as Gerrard's deputy on the field. In the FA Cup sixth round against Birmingham City, he scored the opening goal in the first minute as the Reds thrashed the home team 7–0. He started in the victorious 2006 FA Cup Final against West Ham United, though he missed his spot kick in the penalty shoot-out. During the season, he climbed into the top 25 in the club's all-time appearances table after featuring in the League Cup against Arsenal in January 2007.

Despite speculation in the summer of 2007 linking him to various other Premier League teams, Hyypiä insisted that he would stay at Liverpool for the remainder of his contract. On 25 August 2007, Hyypiä broke his nose during an away match against Sunderland in the Stadium of Light. He quickly returned on the pitch to play against Toulouse in the Champions League qualifying match on 28 August 2007, in which he scored the second goal for Liverpool while wearing the captain's armband in the absence of Steven Gerrard and Jamie Carragher.

In April 2008, Hyypiä signed a new deal until summer 2009, with Benítez stating he was a good role model for young defenders such as Martin Škrtel and Daniel Agger. The 2008–09 season marked the defender's tenth season at the club. On 22 August 2008, Premier League newcomers Stoke City offered £2.5 million for Hyypiä, but Liverpool rejected the offer. On 2 March 2008, with his appearance against Bolton Wanderers, Hyypiä made it into the top 20 Liverpool player appearances of all time.

Hyypiä was voted in 19th place in Sky Sports' "Top 50 Premier League Foreign Players", 45th in FourFourTwo's 100 Greatest Foreign Players and 38th in Liverpool's 100 Players Who Shook the Kop survey. Underlining the important role Hyypiä had fulfilled at Liverpool, Ian Rush noted: "He's got to be up there with the best signings the club has ever made."

In September 2008, Hyypiä was not included in the 25-man Liverpool squad for the group stages of the Champions League, as new UEFA regulations meant that clubs had to include at least eight home-grown players in their squad.

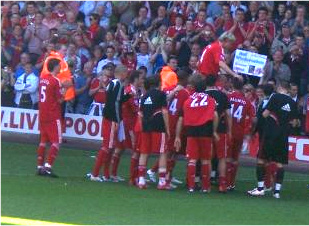
Hyypiä's teammates say farewell

On 4 May 2009, it was announced that Hyypiä had signed a two-year contract with German Bundesliga side Bayer Leverkusen. Liverpool had offered him the chance to stay at Anfield in a coaching capacity, but Hyypiä decided to carry on playing, though he expressed interest in returning to Liverpool as a coach once his playing career concluded.

Hyypiä played his last match for Liverpool at Anfield against Tottenham Hotspur on 24 May 2009, coming on as a substitute to replace captain Steven Gerrard after 84 minutes in their 3–1 win. Gerrard passed the captain's armband to him, personally putting it onto Hyypiä's arm. During what remained of the match, Hyypiä managed to get a header from a corner kick in the dying minutes of the game, but the attempt was blocked by Heurelho Gomes. After the match ended, an emotional Hyypiä received a standing ovation from Liverpool fans and his teammates held him aloft. Hyypiä made 464 appearances and scored 35 goals, winning ten trophies in the ten years he was at Liverpool.

=== Bayer Leverkusen ===
Hyypiä moved to Bundesliga side Bayer Leverkusen during summer 2009, making his official debut on 8 August against Mainz 05. On 24 January 2010, he scored his first Bundesliga goal in a 3–0 win over 1899 Hoffenheim. Hyypiä's first season with Bayer Leverkusen saw his club finishing fourth overall, missing by two points the qualification round for the 2010–11 Champions League campaign. German sports magazine kicker chose Hyypiä as best Bundesliga defender in 2009, and he was included Bundesliga Team of the Year for 2009–10.

After Roy Hodgson was appointed as the new Liverpool manager in August 2010, rumours began to circulate that he was determined to bring Hyypiä back to Liverpool. However, the transfer fell through as reportedly Hodgson could not get Hyypiä out of his contract with Leverkusen. On 25 September 2010, Hyypiä scored his third ever Bundesliga goal with a header against VfB Stuttgart in a 4–1 win.

Hyypiä made public on 6 October 2010 that, post-retirement, he planned to join Leverkusen as assistant manager. On 2 May 2011, he announced his retirement from playing professional football. Hyypiä appeared in more than 560 top-flight matches in Finland, the Netherlands, England and Germany.

== International career ==
Hyypiä was capped 27 times by the Finland national under-21 team. He made his debut for the senior team against Tunisia on 7 November 1992 at the age of 19. He went on to be a key member of the Finnish squad, participating in five UEFA European Championship and four FIFA World Cup qualifiers. In a friendly against Sweden on 12 August 2009, he became one of four Finland national team players ever to reach milestone of 100 international appearances. Hyypiä succeeded Jari Litmanen as captain of the Finland national team in 2008. He was given a straight red card in his penultimate match for a 36th-minute foul on Viorel Frunza as Finland lost 2–0 away to Moldova in a qualifier. His last appearance for national team was against Hungary in a UEFA Euro 2012 qualifier on 12 October 2010, a 2–1 home defeat.

With a total of 105 matches, Hyypiä ranks in the summer of 2023 as fourth among all-time most capped Finnish players; only Jari Litmanen, Teemu Pukki and Jonatan Johannson have been capped more.

== Coaching career ==
=== Bayer Leverkusen ===
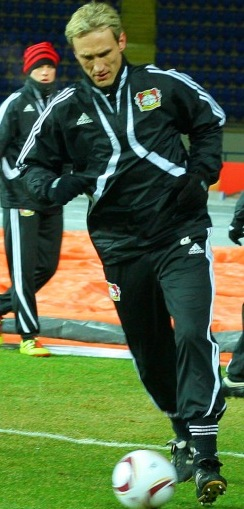
Hyypiä as Bayer Leverkusen head coach.

Hyypiä became part of the coaching staff for both Finland national team and Bayer Leverkusen. He started a coaching formation at the Football Association of Finland. In October 2011, Hyypiä was in Leverkusen for six weeks as a trainee with the club's then-head coach, Robin Dutt. On 1 April 2012, Hyypiä and under-19 coach Sascha Lewandowski were named as caretaker coaches of Leverkusen after the sacking of Dutt. On 15 May 2012, Hyypiä was confirmed as team manager and Lewandowski as head coach of Bayer Leverkusen until the summer of 2015. In an unusual managerial set-up, both were equally responsible for leading Bayer Leverkusen: as Lewandowski had the training licence, he had to be at post-match press conferences and took care of the training sessions. Meanwhile, Hyypiä watched them, intervened with personal talks and was at the pre-game press conferences. Despite his imperfect grasp of the German language, Hyypiä addressed the team before matches. This system proved successful: in the middle of the 2012–13 season, Leverkusen was second in the Bundesliga, were the only side to beat Bayern Munich at home and qualified for the next round in the Champions League, and the DFB-Pokal. Bayer Leverkusen ended the 2012–13 season in third place behind the champions Bayern and runners-up Borussia Dortmund. Hyypiä became the sole head coach after Lewandowski went back to work with the youth development department.

Hyypiä's first training session as the sole head coach occurred on 24 June 2013. Bayer Leverkusen ended the 2013–14 season in fourth place, behind Bayern Munich, Borussia Dortmund and Schalke 04. On 5 April 2014, Hyypiä was sacked by Bayer Leverkusen with immediate effect after the club lost to Hamburger SV the night before.

=== Brighton & Hove Albion ===
On 6 June 2014, Hyypiä was officially named manager of Football League Championship club Brighton & Hove Albion, signing a three-year contract. His reign as Brighton boss started with two successive 1–0 defeats, before tasting victory in his third game in charge. Results were poor, and on 22 December 2014, with the team in the relegation zone, Hyypiä offered his resignation as manager after a 1–1 draw at Wolverhampton Wanderers; Brighton chairman Tony Bloom announced that Hyypiä's resignation was reluctantly accepted. Hyypiä's decision to step down came after his side only managed one win in their previous 18 games, with the club securing six victories in his 26 in charge, three of which came in cup ties.

=== Zürich ===
On 21 August 2015, Hyypiä was officially announced as the manager of the Swiss Super League club Zürich. On 12 May 2016, Hyypiä was sacked as coach of Zürich after he had lost a vote of no confidence in the team. He left the club in last place with three rounds before the end of the season; Zürich were ultimately relegated to the Swiss second division, the Swiss Challenge League.

=== Haka ===
After taking a break from the game, he joined Finnish side Haka in 2020 as assistant manager, but left after just three months.

== Personal life ==
In 2002, Hyypiä released an autobiography, From Voikkaa to the Premiership.

Hyypiä was married to Susanna between 2007 and 2022, when the couple divorced. He has two sons from his first marriage. Off the pitch, he is generally a private person and, although his ex-wife had been occasionally seen at his matches, their children rarely appear in public. He lived with his family near Pulheim near Cologne and had an English second home because of his time as manager of Brighton & Hove Albion.

Since 2021, Hyypiä has been dating Finnish racing driver Emma Kimiläinen.

Hyypiä has set up a fund to help young promising athletes of his native Finland. As part of his efforts to raise funds, he participated in the Helsinki City Marathon, his first ever, on 20 August 2011, completing the course in a time of 3:56:09.

Hyypiä was named in the Finnish Football Hall of Fame in 2015, and in the Finnish Sports Hall of Fame on 11 January 2024.

== Career statistics ==
=== Club ===
Appearances and goals by club, season and competition
Club	Season	League			National cup (Note: Includes Finnish Cup, KNVB Cup, FA Cup, DFB-Pokal)		League cup (Note: Includes Football League Cup)		Continental		Other		Total	
Club	Season	Division	Apps	Goals	Apps	Goals	Apps	Goals	Apps	Goals	Apps	Goals	Apps	Goals
Kumu	1991	Ykkönen	19	0			—		—		—		19	0
MyPa	1992	Veikkausliiga	33	0			—		—		—		33	0
MyPa	1993	Veikkausliiga	12	0			—		1 (Note: Appearance in UEFA Cup Winners' Cup)	0	—		13	0
MyPa	1994	Veikkausliiga	25	5			—		4 (Note: Appearances in UEFA Cup)	0	—		29	5
MyPa	1995	Veikkausliiga	26	3			—		4	0	—		30	3
MyPa	Total		96	8			0	0	9	0	0	0	107	8
Willem II	1995–96	Eredivisie	14	0			—		—		—		14	0
Willem II	1996–97	Eredivisie	30	1			—		—		—		30	1
Willem II	1997–98	Eredivisie	30	0			—		—		—		30	0
Willem II	1998–99	Eredivisie	26	2	1	0	—		4	0	—		59	4
Willem II	Total		100	3	1	0	0	0	4	0	0	0	105	3
Liverpool	1999–2000	Premier League	38	2	2	0	2	0	—		—		42	2
Liverpool	2000–01	Premier League	35	3	6	0	6	1	11	0	—		58	4
Liverpool	2001–02	Premier League	37	3	2	0	1	0	16 (Note: Appearances in UEFA Champions League)	2	1 (Note: Appearance in FA Community Shield)	0	57	5
Liverpool	2002–03	Premier League	36	3	3	0	4	0	12	2	1	0	56	5
Liverpool	2003–04	Premier League	38	4	4	0	1	0	8	1	—		51	5
Liverpool	2004–05	Premier League	32	2	1	0	1	0	15	1	—		49	3
Liverpool	2005–06	Premier League	36	1	6	1	1	0	13	0	3 (Note: One appearance in UEFA Super Cup, two appearances in FIFA Club World Cup)	0	59	2
Liverpool	2006–07	Premier League	23	2	0	0	1	1	5	0	0	0	29	3
Liverpool	2007–08	Premier League	27	1	4	1	0	0	13	2	—		44	4
Liverpool	2008–09	Premier League	16	1	1	0	2	1	0	0	—		19	2
Liverpool	Total		318	22	29	2	19	3	93	8	5	0	464	35
Bayer Leverkusen	2009–10	Bundesliga	32	2	1	0	–		–		—		33	2
Bayer Leverkusen	2010–11	Bundesliga	21	1	1	0	–		5 (Note: Appearances in UEFA Europa League)	0	—		27	1
Bayer Leverkusen	Total		53	3	2	0	0	0	5	0	0	0	60	3
Career total			586	36	32	2	19	3	111	8	5	0	753	49

=== International ===
Appearances and goals by national team and year
National team	Year	Apps	Goals
Finland	1992	1	0
Finland	1993	0	0
Finland	1994	2	0
Finland	1995	4	0
Finland	1996	5	0
Finland	1997	4	0
Finland	1998	7	0
Finland	1999	7	1
Finland	2000	6	0
Finland	2001	7	0
Finland	2002	6	1
Finland	2003	9	2
Finland	2004	8	0
Finland	2005	8	0
Finland	2006	7	1
Finland	2007	9	0
Finland	2008	5	0
Finland	2009	8	0
Finland	2010	2	0
Total		105	5

Scores and results list Finland's goal tally first, score column indicates score after each Hyypiä goal.

List of international goals scored by Sami Hyypiä
No.	Date	Venue	Opponent	Score	Result	Competition
1	9 October 1999	Helsinki Olympic Stadium, Helsinki	Northern Ireland	2–1	4–1	Euro 2000 qualifier
2	12 October 2002	Helsinki Olympic Stadium, Helsinki	Azerbaijan	3–0	3–0	Euro 2004 qualifier
3	12 February 2003	Windsor Park, Belfast	Northern Ireland	1–0	1–0	Friendly
4	7 June 2003	Helsinki Olympic Stadium, Helsinki	Serbia and Montenegro	1–0	3–0	Euro 2004 qualifier
5	11 October 2006	Almaty Central Stadium, Almaty	Kazakhstan	2–0	2–0	Euro 2008 qualifier

== Managerial statistics ==
As of 12 May 2016

Managerial record by team and tenure
Team	From	To	Record					Ref.
Team	From	To	P	W	D	L	Win %	Ref.
Bayer Leverkusen^{1}	1 April 2012	5 April 2014	92	50	15	27	54.3	
Brighton & Hove Albion	6 June 2014	22 December 2014	26	6	10	10	23.1	
Zürich	21 August 2015	12 May 2016	30	9	10	11	30.0	
Total			148	65	35	48	43.9	—

- 1.Sami Hyypiä and Sascha Lewandowski were both in-charge of the first team.
- 2.Sascha Lewandowski left the first team to go back to work with the youth team. Hyypiä's first training session was on 12 March 2013.

== Honours ==
MyPa

- Finnish Cup: 1992, 1995

Liverpool

- FA Cup: 2000–01, 2005–06
- Football League Cup: 2000–01, 2002–03; runner-up: 2004–05
- FA Charity/Community Shield: 2001, 2006
- UEFA Champions League: 2004–05; runner-up 2006–07
- UEFA Cup: 2000–01
- UEFA Super Cup: 2001, 2005
- FIFA Club World Championship runner-up: 2005

Finland

- Nordic Football Championship: 2000–01

Individual

- UEFA Team of the Year: 2001
- ESM Team of the Year: 2000–01
- Liverpool Player of the Season: 2001–02
- Finnish Sportsperson of the Year: 2001
- Premier League Player of the Month: November 1999
- PFA Team of the Year: 1999–2000 Premier League, 2001–02 Premier League
- Finnish Sports Hall of Fame
- Finnish Footballer of the Year: 1999, 2000, 2001, 2002, 2003, 2005, 2006, 2008, 2009, 2010
- kicker Bundesliga Team of the Season: 2009–10
- UEFA awards 100 caps: 2011
- Finnish Football Hall of Fame inductee: 2015

== See also ==
- List of men's footballers with 100 or more international caps
