= Jason Wall =

Curaçao footballer

Personal information
- Full name: Jason Victorino Jozef Wall
- Date of birth: 10 December 1991 (age 34)
- Place of birth: Willemstad, Curaçao
- Height: 1.83 m (6 ft 0 in)
- Position: Right back

Team information
- Current team: RKTVV Tilburg

Senior career*
Years	Team	Apps	(Gls)
2012–2013	RKTVV Tilburg		
2013–2014	Willem II	0	(0)
2014–	RKTVV Tilburg		

International career^{‡}
2014–	Curaçao	7	(0)
- * Club domestic league appearances and goals as of 15:20, 28 March 2015 (UTC) ‡ National team caps and goals as of 15:20, 28 March 2015 (UTC)

Jason Victorino Jozef Wall (born 10 December 1991) is a Curaçao international footballer who plays for Dutch club RKTVV Tilburg, as a right back.

== Career ==
Born in Willemstad, Wall has played club football for RKTVV Tilburg and Willem II.

He made his international debut for Curaçao in 2014.
