= Jatto Ceesay =

Gambian footballer

Personal information
- Date of birth: 16 November 1974 (age 52)
- Place of birth: Banjul, the Gambia
- Height: 1.73 m (5 ft 8 in)
- Position: Forward

Senior career*
Years	Team	Apps	(Gls)
1993–1995	Wallidan Sens	15	(8)
1995–2005	Willem II	232	(38)
2003	→ Al-Hilal (loan)	5	(0)
2006–2007	AEK Larnaca	27	(12)
2007–2008	Omniworld	9	(0)
2008	AEP Paphos	11	(0)
2009	Digenis Morphou	15	(6)
2010	Othellos Athienou	13	(3)
2010–2011	Ayia Napa	23	(11)
2011–2012	Ormideia	25	(9)

International career
1994–2006	The Gambia	17	(5)
- * Club domestic league appearances and goals

Jatto Ceesay (born 16 November 1974) is a Gambian former professional footballer who played as a forward.

== Career ==
Born in Banjul, Ceesay started to play football as a small boy with the Gambian team Wallidan Sens. As a young boy he left to go to the Netherlands. At 20-years of age Ceesay made his debut for Willem II. After eight seasons in which he was a regular first-team player, he left in the summer of 2003, joining Al-Hilal in Saudi Arabia.

This adventure provided no sporting success and he returned in the winter of 2004 to Willem II. He continued to play competitive games for the Tilburgers in the 2003–04 season, though mainly as a back-up. Partly due to the presence of Kevin Bobson, Martijn Reuser and Anouar Hadouir he made only 14 appearances, in which he scored four times. Ceesay also struggled to feature in the 2005–06 season. Eventually he left in the winter to join AEK Larnaca, where he was with Raymond Victoria and Donny de Groot, two former Willem players. In the summer of 2007 these two players left Cyprus. Ceesay followed and returned to the Netherlands, where he joined FC Omniworld.

He stopped playing professionally in 2012.

Scores and results list The Gambia's goal tally first, score column indicates score after each Ceesay goal.

List of international goals scored by Jatto Ceesay
No.	Date	Venue	Opponent	Score	Result	Competition	Ref.
1	17 November 1995	Stade Olympique, Nouakchott, Mauritania	Mauritania	1-2	1-2	1995 Amílcar Cabral Cup	
2	1 September 2002	Independence Stadium, Bakau, The Gambia	Guinea	1-0	1-0	Friendly	
3	13 October 2002	Independence Stadium, Bakau, The Gambia	Lesotho	4-0	6-0	2004 African Cup of Nations qualification	
4	13 October 2002	Independence Stadium, Bakau, The Gambia	Lesotho	6-0	6-0	2004 African Cup of Nations qualification	
5	3 September 2006	Independence Stadium, Bakau, The Gambia	Cape Verde	1-0	2-0	2008 Africa Cup of Nations qualification	
