= Nuelson Wau =

Dutch Antillean retired footballer (born 1980)

Personal information
- Full name: Nuelson Francisco Emanuel Wau
- Date of birth: 17 December 1980 (age 45)
- Place of birth: Geldrop-Mierlo, Netherlands
- Height: 1.75 m (5 ft 9 in)
- Position: Right-back

Youth career
- CRKSV Jong Colombia
- PSV
- Willem II

Senior career*
Years	Team	Apps	(Gls)
1999–2007	Willem II	134	(1)
2008	Roda JC Kerkrade	10	(0)
2008	Nea Salamina Famagusta	0	(0)
2009	Willem II	9	(0)
2009–2012	Cambuur	21	(0)
Total		174	(1)

International career
2004	Netherlands Antilles	2	(0)
- * Club domestic league appearances and goals

Nuelson Francisco Emanuel Wau (born 17 December 1980) is a former professional footballer who played as a right-back. Born in the Netherlands, he made two appearances for the Netherlands Antilles national team. His first professional match was on 22 April 2000.
