= Marino Promes =

Dutch footballer

Marino Promes (born 11 February 1977 in Haarlem) is a Dutch former professional footballer who played for Eerste Divisie and Eredivisie clubs HFC Haarlem, Willem II, De Graafschap and FC Zwolle between 1994 and 2004.
