= Stephen Vaughan Jr. =

English footballer (born 1985)

Stephen Vaughan
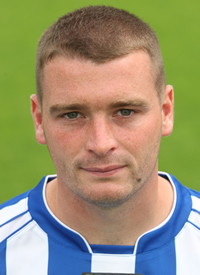

Personal information
- Full name: Stephen James Vaughan
- Date of birth: 22 January 1985 (age 41)
- Place of birth: Liverpool, England
- Height: 5 ft 8 in (1.73 m)
- Positions: Midfielder; full-back

Youth career
- Liverpool

Senior career*
Years	Team	Apps	(Gls)
2003–2004	Liverpool	0	(0)
2004–2007	Chester City	83	(0)
2007	→ Rochdale (loan)	0	(0)
2007	Boston United	7	(0)
2008–2010	Chester City	9	(0)
2008	→ Droylsden (loan)	8	(0)
2009–2010	→ Northwich Victoria (loan)	9	(1)

Managerial career
- 2016-2018: Bangor City (director of football)
- 2018: Bangor City (caretaker)
- 2019: Bangor City
- * Club domestic league appearances and goals

Stephen James Vaughan (born 22 January 1985) is an English former professional footballer and current UEFA qualified football coach and convicted criminal. He is also a BBBofC licensed Boxing promoter. He is also the former President of Maltese Premier League side Floriana FC., ex-assistant coach/technical director of Mosta FC and also served a period as director of football at Bangor City. From August 2023 until June 2025 he was the president of St. George's F.C. in Malta.

Vaughan played as a midfielder from 2003 to 2010, mainly for Chester City, a club his father owned. He also played for Rochdale, Boston United, Droylsden and Northwich Victoria. In his second spell with Chester he became player/owner after taking over the reins from his father. In 2010, he left the club and retired from playing at the age of 25 due to a serious Achilles injury.

In 2016, he was convicted of perverting the course of justice in relation to the murder of a Liverpool police constable, and served a custodial sentence.

In August 2023, Vaughan was appointed the President of Maltese third-tier club St. George's F.C.

== Playing career ==
Vaughan started his career at Liverpool, playing reserve and youth football. However, he was released in 2004 having played over 70 reserve games. He represented England at Under-15, Under-17 and Under-19 level.

He was soon signed by League Two side Chester City, which was owned by his father Stephen Vaughan Sr., under the guidance of Mark Wright. He quickly became a regular at the Deva Stadium, and became the owner of the club in 2009.

At the start of the 2006–07 season, he was made Chester's captain aged 21. He made 58 league appearances. On 3 January 2007, new Rochdale manager Keith Hill made Vaughan his first signing, initially on loan until 4 February, with a view to a permanent deal. However, on 18 January 2007, Boston United signed him on a one-year contract from Chester City. He made seven appearances for the Pilgrims before rupturing his Achilles tendon against Hartlepool, which sidelined him for nine-months. Now fully recovered, he rejoined Chester on 8 February 2008. He was then loaned out to Droylsden in the Conference National for a month, as part of a rehabilitation programme.

Stephen made his first league appearance back for the club in a 5–1 win over Barnet on 30 August 2008, playing the full 90 minutes along with his brother, James. He made eight appearances during the 2008–09 season in The Football League and started the opening game of the following season against Cambridge United in the Conference National.

In September 2009 he joined Northwich Victoria on loan.

== Post-playing career ==
Vaughan was the president of Floriana FC. He resigned on 4 February 2014 and became technical director of Mosta FC. He left his position at Mosta FC following a successful six-month period, leading the club to its highest position in history as they finished fourth in the Maltese Premier League in the 2013–14 season, before returning to the UK. At the present (2023) he has returned to Malta and has been elected president of the pioneers St. George's F.C in the city of Cospicua (founded 1890).

On 4 November 2016, it was announced that Vaughan had been appointed full-time director of football at Welsh Premier League side Bangor City having already been working in the role on a part-time basis from 1 August 2016. In his first season the club qualified for the Europa League by winning the play-offs. This followed in the second season with the club finishing second and automatically qualifying again for the Europa League. On 26 April 2018 the FAW Club Licensing Appeals Body decided to revoke Bangor City's Tier 1 and UEFA license due to not meeting financial criteria meaning that they would automatically drop down to the second level of Welsh football the next season and would not be able to compete for a place in the following season's Europa League. Prior to this Bangor had been one of only three clubs to have been ever present in the league since it began in 1992.

In October 2018, he was appointed interim manager of Bangor City following the resignation of Craig Harrison. He left the club in November to take up a position as assistant manager of Maltese club Mosta.

On 5 July 2019, he was appointed manager of Bangor City following the resignation of Gary Taylor-Fletcher. He left the club in September.

In June 2020, he was appointed manager of Boca Gibraltar in the Gibraltar National League, but did not formally take up the role.

== Boxing promotions ==
Vaughan is a licensed boxing promoter in the UK & Malta.

== Personal life ==
He is the son of former football chairman, and fellow boxing promoter and criminal Stephen Vaughan Sr.

He was charged with and convicted of perverting the course of justice in relation to the murder of Neil Doyle, a Liverpool police constable.
