= Mark Peers =

English footballer

Personal information
- Date of birth: 14 May 1984 (age 42)
- Place of birth: St Helens, England
- Position: Midfielder

Team information
- Current team: Canterbury United

Youth career
- 2001–2003: Liverpool

Senior career*
Years	Team	Apps	(Gls)
2003–2004	Raith Rovers	5	(0)
2004–2005	Prescot Cables	15	(7)
2005	Leigh RMI	7	(1)
2005	Southport	8	(0)
2005–2007	Witton Albion	100	(17)
2007–2008	Fleetwood Town	10	(4)
2008–2010	FC Halifax Town	25	(10)
2010	Chester	6	(0)
2010	Northwich Victoria	25	(5)
2011	Kendal Town	9	(1)
2011–2013	Ashton United	40	(10)
2013–2014	Armadale	3	(1)
2014–	Canterbury United	7	(1)
- * Club domestic league appearances and goals as of 18 March 2012

Mark Peers (born 14 May 1984) was a professional footballer who played for Canterbury United FC as a wide-midfielder/winger.

== Playing career ==
=== Early career ===
Peers began his footballing career at Liverpool in 2001. He left for Raith Rovers in 2003. Peers got off to a good start at Raith by scoring on his debut but was to make only another 4 appearances before leaving Scotland early in 2004.

=== English Non-League ===
The pacey wide-midfield man then moved to Prescot Cables where he would remain until February 2005 before joining Leigh RMI in the conference premier division. He would remain there until 2006 when he moved to Witton Albion, he would play more than 100 games and scored 17 goals in one season. He left for Fleetwood Town on 17 June 2008. He would remain there until February 2009, when he signed for FC Halifax Town. In the summer of 2010, he joined the newly reformed Chester on trial and scored a spectacular goal in a friendly win against Aberystwyth Town. He later joined the club on contract.

On 21 October 2010 he moved to Northwich Victoria. and made his debut two days later against Burscough.

Having played around 25 league and cup games for the Vics he then had a short and rather troubled injury hit 8 weeks with Kendal town and decided to make the switch to Ashton United F.C. in October 2011. He spent almost 18 months with Ashton United playing around 40 games before deciding to make the switch and play down under by joining Armadale SC in the Western Australia State League in March 2013.
