= Stephen Vaughan Sr. =

English businessman (c. 1962–2025)

Stephen Vaughan
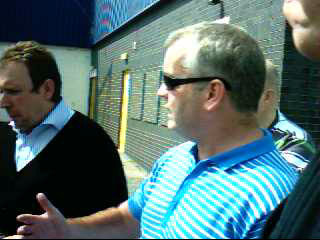
- Born: c. 1962; Liverpool, England
- Died: July 2025 (aged 62)
- Occupations: Businessman; Boxing promoter; football and Rugby League Club Chairman
- Known for: Ownership and chairmanship of football clubs (Barrow, Chester City), rugby league club (Widnes Vikings), and boxing promotions (Vaughan Promotions)
- Children: Stephen Vaughan Jr.
- Status: Deceased
- Criminal charges: Money laundering investigation, VAT fraud, affray, serious assault of a police officer
- Penalty: Disqualified from acting as a company director for 11 years (due to VAT fraud); 15 months imprisonment (for affray and assault of a police officer)

Stephen Vaughan (c. 1962 – July 2025) was an English businessman and convicted criminal. Through his ownership of Vaughan Promotions, originally a boxing promotion and management company, he owned the Barrow and Chester City football clubs, serving as chairman of both. During his time as chairman of the two clubs, both clubs initially saw success on the pitch, but his tenure at both ended due to Vaughan's involvement in criminal investigations. Vaughan was also involved with Droylsden, and was chairman of the Widnes Vikings rugby league team.

== Barrow ==
Vaughan contested 77 amateur boxing bouts. He formed Vaughan Promotions in 1990 to promote professional boxing promotions in the United Kingdom. His company purchased Barrow in 1995, and Vaughan invested heavily in the club, building a new 1200 seat grandstand. His investments led to Barrow winning the Unibond Premier League title in the 1997–98 season. However, during that season Vaughan resigned as chairman due to a money laundering investigation by HM Customs and Excise. Vaughan's links to gangster Curtis Warren also became public; in Warren's biography, he relates an incident where he flew over Barrow's Holker Street field and commented, "I own that". Nothing came of the Customs and Excise investigation, and Vaughan reinstated himself as chairman.

Vaughan had been using his own money to fund the club; when he left Barrow permanently in November 1998, his departure resulted in financial difficulties for the club. Furthermore, it was discovered that Vaughan had transferred Holker Street to his company, Vaughan Promotions, in return for his investment. Barrow were removed from the Football Conference for improper administration. A lengthy dispute over the ownership of Holker Street followed, during which time Barrow were readmitted to play in the Northern Premier League in September 1999. Vaughan remained the major shareholder in the old company, but day-to-day running of the club had been taken over by the newly formed Barrow AFC (1999). Eventually, it was ruled that the club legally owned Holker Street, and was allowed to sell the asset to pay off the first charge on the stadium to Cherrytree Finance.

== Chester City ==
In the ensuing years, Vaughan was linked with attempts to buy a number of clubs, finally purchasing a majority share of Chester City in 2001. However, shortly after Vaughan's purchase, Chester were drawn to play Barrow in the FA Cup. Under Football Association (FA) rules, Vaughan could not own shares in both teams. Using a loophole in those rules, a few days prior to the match he transferred his Barrow shares to a local painter and decorator for a nominal sum. After the game, the shares were transferred back. A few days later, new Barrow chairman Brian Keen completed the purchase of Vaughan's shares.

At Chester, Vaughan again invested heavily, improving the club's facilities (Deva Stadium), and during his tenure, the team won the Football Conference in 2004. In February 2002, Vaughan also bought shares in a rugby league club, the Widnes Vikings, eventually owning enough shares to have a majority control by 2006. Difficulties in securing a ground in Chester led to discussions about moving the football club to Widnes, but nothing came of this and Vaughan quit as the Widnes Vikings chairman in April 2007. A few months later, he also stood down as chairman of Chester, following a controversy in which he arranged for the club to hold a minute's silence following the death of Colin Smith, a murdered Liverpool gangster, and associate of Curtis Warren. Vaughan remained the majority shareholder in the club, which began to run into financial problems. A sale was announced to Gary Metcalf, a Liverpool-based businessman, which came to nothing, so ownership of the club was eventually transferred to Stephen Vaughan Jr., Vaughan's son, in April 2009. Chester went into voluntary administration, and were bought by Chester City Ltd., a company entirely owned by members of the Vaughan family, including the senior Vaughan.

== Financial difficulties VAT fraud ==
These financial difficulties coincided with on-the-pitch struggles. Chester were relegated from the Football League at the end of the 2008–09 season. They were initially barred from competing in the 2009–10 season due to HM Revenue and Customs revoking the proposed CVA (company voluntary arrangement), but the club was eventually given FA affiliation. This came, however, with a 25-point penalty at the start of the 2009–10 season. This left the club struggling in the Football Conference. Chester continued to experience financial difficulties. In November 2009, Vaughan was disqualified from acting as a director of any company for a period of 11 years, following his involvement in a £500,000 VAT fraud whilst a director of the Widnes Vikings. As a result, he became the first owner of a professional football club to fail the FA's fit-and-proper-person test, and was forced to reduce his shareholding in Chester City. Control of the club passed back to Stephen Vaughan Jr., with Vaughan Sr. continuing to inject loans into the club, as fans stayed away. By February 2010 Vaughan had stopped any injection of capital into the club so they were unable to fulfill their financial obligations, and the club was suspended from the Football Conference, pending a vote on their ejection to be held on 26 February. The decision was made to expel Chester City from the Football Conference and, following a court order on 10 March, it was confirmed that the club were to be wound up.

== Move to Malta ==
On 4 April 2010, Vaughan Sr. and his son, along with a 29-year-old man from Neston, were arrested on suspicion of affray and the serious assault of a police officer. Both were convicted, with Vaughan Sr. sentenced to fifteen months in jail, and his son given community service. Vaughan remained in jail until his release in September 2011, by which time Vaughan Jr. had begun to rebuild the Vaughan Boxing promotion business.

Vaughan attempted a return to football in 2012, when he tried to launch a new club in Widnes, but failed due to being refused permission to use Halton Stadium. In April 2012, Vaughan purchased Floriana FC of Malta. Stephen Vaughan Jr. was subsequently appointed Chairman/ President of the club in January 2013. With this move, the Vaughan Boxing Promotions company also shifted toward boxing promotion in Malta. In February 2014, the Vaughan family sold their investment in Floriana FC to Riccardo Gaucci, joining Mosta FC as main shirt sponsors, and then in the summer of 2014 signed a two-year sponsorship with Hibernians FC.

== Return to the UK ==
In 2016, Vaughan helped create a company called VSM ('Vaughan Sports Management), which became the main shirt sponsors of Bangor City when new organizers purchased the club. Although Vaughan Sr was present at the launch of the new ownership, the new chairman Ivor Jenkins insisted that Vaughan, who had been banned since 2010 from being a company director in the UK, was not involved with running the club. Stephen Vaughan Jr. was later appointed Director of Football and a coach at the club.

== Death ==
Vaughan Sr. died in July 2025, at the age of 62, with his son confirming the news on 3 July.
