= Raymond Victoria =

Dutch footballer (born 1972)

Personal information
- Date of birth: 10 October 1972 (age 54)
- Place of birth: Utrecht, Netherlands
- Height: 1.80 m (5 ft 11 in)
- Position: Midfielder

Youth career
- VVIJ
- Feyenoord

Senior career*
Years	Team	Apps	(Gls)
1989–1991	Feyenoord	1	(0)
1991–1993	Bayern Munich	0	(0)
1993–1998	De Graafschap	139	(16)
1998–2006	Willem II	198	(5)
2006–2007	AEK Larnaca	22	(0)
2007–2008	ADO Den Haag	12	(0)
Total		372	(21)

International career
2004	Netherlands Antilles	3	(0)
- * Club domestic league appearances and goals

Raymond Victoria (born 10 October 1972) is a former professional footballer who played as a midfielder.

== Career ==
Victoria was born in Utrecht. He played for Feyenoord, De Graafschap, Willem II and ADO Den Haag in the Netherlands. After making more than 200 appearances in seven seasons with Willem II, and helping the club reach the 2004–05 KNVB Cup final, Victoria signed for Cypriot side AEK Larnaca in June 2006.
