= 1951–52 Netherlands Football League Championship =

Netherl. Football Championship
- Season: 1951–1952
- Champions: Willem II (2nd title)

The Netherlands Football League Championship 1951–1952 was contested by 56 teams participating in four divisions. The national champion would be determined by a play-off featuring the winners of each division of the Netherlands. Willem II won this year's championship by beating Hermes DVS, HFC Haarlem and AFC Ajax.

== New entrants ==
This season, there was one division less than in the last one. This meant that the team had to be reassigned.
Eerste Klasse A:

- Moving in from other Divisions: AGOVV Apeldoorn, DWV, HFC EDO, Enschedese Boys, HVV 't Gooi, HFC Haarlem, De Volewijckers
- Promoted from 2nd Division: Elinkwijk & Theole

Eerste Klasse B:

- Moving in from other Divisions: Achilles, Be Quick 1887, Blauw-Wit Amsterdam, VV Leeuwarden, RCH, Sneek Wit Zwart, VSV and Zwolsche Boys
- Promoted from 2nd Division: Oosterparkers

Eerste Klasse C:

- Moving in from other Divisions: Bleijerheide, BVV Den Bosch, Feijenoord, FC Eindhoven, MVV Maastricht, NAC, RBC Roosendaal, Sittardia and Willem II
- Promoted from 2nd Division: DHC Delft, Juliana & Quick Nijmegen

Eerste Klasse D:

- Moving in from other Divisions: Brabantia, VV Chèvremont, Hermes DVS, HBS Craeyenhout, SV Limburgia, Maurits, NEC Nijmegen, PSV Eindhoven and VVV Venlo

== Divisions ==
=== Eerste Klasse A ===
Pos	Team	Pld	W	D	L	GF	GA	GD	Pts	Qualification or relegation
1	HFC Haarlem	26	16	8	2	51	22	+29	40	Qualified for Championship play-off and transferred to Eerste B
2	DWS	26	15	9	2	46	16	+30	39	Transferred to Eerste B
3	HFC EDO	26	14	5	7	39	26	+13	33	
4	AGOVV Apeldoorn	26	12	8	6	50	34	+16	32	Transferred to Eerste B
5	sc Heerenveen	26	11	9	6	55	40	+15	31	Transferred to Eerste B
6	Enschedese Boys	26	12	5	9	44	40	+4	29	
7	LAC Frisia 1883	26	10	7	9	47	50	−3	27	
8	HVV 't Gooi	26	10	7	9	27	29	−2	27	Transferred to Eerste B
9	De Volewijckers	26	10	6	10	44	40	+4	26	
10	Elinkwijk	26	8	7	11	41	53	−12	23	Transferred to Eerste B
11	GVAV Rapiditas	26	9	4	13	50	42	+8	22	
12	Go Ahead	26	5	6	15	38	48	−10	16	Transferred to Eerste B
13	Theole	26	3	5	18	28	68	−40	11	Transferred to Eerste C
14	Velocitas 1897	26	2	4	20	24	76	−52	8	Relegated to 2nd Division

Source: rsssf.com

=== Eerste Klasse B ===
Pos	Team	Pld	W	D	L	GF	GA	GD	Pts	Qualification
1	AFC Ajax	26	19	4	3	76	29	+47	42	Qualified for Championship play-off and transferred to Eerste A
2	RCH	26	13	7	6	64	36	+28	33	Transferred to Eerste A
3	Vitesse Arnhem	26	12	9	5	54	36	+18	33	
4	VV Leeuwarden	26	15	3	8	61	49	+12	33	
5	FC Wageningen	26	14	4	8	64	33	+31	32	Transferred to Eerste A
6	DOS	26	12	6	8	68	48	+20	30	Transferred to Eerste A
7	Be Quick 1887	26	13	3	10	49	38	+11	29	
8	SC Enschede	26	9	7	10	36	44	−8	25	
9	VSV	26	7	10	9	37	40	−3	24	Transferred to Eerste A
10	Zwolsche Boys	26	8	8	10	37	46	−9	24	Transferred to Eerste A
11	Blauw-Wit Amsterdam	26	6	11	9	38	46	−8	23	
12	Sneek Wit Zwart	26	6	4	16	29	67	−38	16	Transferred to Eerste A
13	Achilles 1894	27	5	2	20	27	68	−41	12	Relegation play-off as level on points after 26 games
14	Oosterparkers	27	3	4	20	28	88	−60	10	Relegation play-off as level on points after 26 games

Source: rsssf.com

Achilles 1894 beat Oosterparkers in the play-off to avoid relegation.

=== Eerste Klasse C ===
Pos	Team	Pld	W	D	L	GF	GA	GD	Pts	Qualification or relegation
1	Willem II	26	18	6	2	80	30	+50	42	Qualified for Championship play-off
2	FC Eindhoven	26	17	6	3	82	40	+42	40	Transferred to Eerste D
3	BVV Den Bosch	26	13	5	8	53	39	+14	31	
4	Feijenoord	26	14	3	9	57	51	+6	31	Transferred to Eerste D
5	MVV Maastricht	26	10	7	9	46	49	−3	27	
6	Bleijerheide	26	11	4	11	52	53	−1	26	Transferred to Eerste D
7	SVV	26	9	7	10	57	64	−7	25	
8	Juliana	26	10	5	11	44	62	−18	25	
9	NAC	26	8	8	10	49	48	+1	24	Transferred to Eerste D
10	ADO Den Haag	26	9	6	11	58	63	−5	24	Transferred to Eerste D
11	Sittardia	26	11	0	15	64	68	−4	22	
12	RBC Roosendaal	26	8	2	16	49	74	−25	18	Transferred to Eerste D
13	DHC Delft	26	7	2	17	55	80	−25	16	Transferred to Eerste D
14	Quick Nijmegen	26	5	3	18	40	65	−25	13	Relegated to 2nd Division

Source: rsssf.com

=== Eerste Klasse D ===
Pos	Team	Pld	W	D	L	GF	GA	GD	Pts	Qualification or relegation
1	Hermes DVS (Note: Hermes DVS and Sparta Rotterdam were level on points after 26 games and played a play-off game to decide the league winners and entrance to the championship play-offs.)	27	16	7	4	77	37	+40	39	Championship play-off and league winner play-off
2	Sparta Rotterdam	27	16	5	6	54	26	+28	37	League winner play-off and transferred to Eerste C
3	PSV Eindhoven	26	15	5	6	65	32	+33	35	
4	VVV Venlo	26	14	4	8	53	36	+17	32	Transferred to Eerste C
5	Limburgia	26	14	3	9	37	42	−5	31	
6	Emma	26	12	5	9	77	52	+25	29	Transferred to Eerste C
7	Xerxes	26	11	5	10	56	44	+12	27	
8	NOAD	26	10	4	12	38	52	−14	24	
9	NEC Nijmegen	26	8	7	11	35	41	−6	23	Transferred to Eerste A
10	HBS Craeyenhout	26	9	3	14	47	62	−15	21	Transferred to Eerste C
11	Maurits	26	7	7	12	49	66	−17	21	
12	Brabantia	26	9	0	17	38	53	−15	18	Transferred to Eerste C
13	LONGA	26	6	4	16	37	78	−41	16	Transferred to Eerste C
14	VV Chevremont	26	6	1	19	34	76	−42	13	Relegated to 2nd Division

Source: rsssf.com
Notes:

Hermes DVS beat Sparta Rotterdam in the play-off to qualify for the Championship play-off.

=== Championship play-off ===
Pos	Team	Pld	W	D	L	GF	GA	GD	Pts	Result	WIL	HER	HAA	AJA
1	Willem II	6	6	0	0	21	9	+12	12	Champion		3–1	6–2	5–2
2	Hermes DVS	6	3	1	2	10	10	0	7		1–2		2–1	2–2
3	HFC Haarlem	6	2	0	4	12	15	−3	4		2–3	1–2		2–0
4	AFC Ajax	6	0	1	5	8	17	−9	1		1–2	1–2	2–4	

Source: rsssf.com
