= Willem II Tilburg =

Association football club in the Netherlands

Willem II
- Full name: Willem II Tilburg
- Nicknames: Tricolores; Superkruiken (Super Pitchers)
- Short name: Willem II
- Founded: 12 August 1896; 130 years ago (as Tilburgia)
- Ground: Koning Willem II Stadion
- Capacity: 15,220
- Chairman: Meindert van Duijvenbode
- Head coach: Jurgen Streppel
- League: Eredivisie
- 2025–26: Eerste Divisie, 3rd of 20 (promoted via play-offs)
- Website: www.willem-ii.nl
Home colours

Willem II Tilburg (Dutch pronunciation: [ˈʋɪləm ˈtʋeː]), commonly known simply as Willem II, is a Dutch football club based in Tilburg, Netherlands. They play in the Eredivisie, the top tier of Dutch football, following promotion from the Eerste Divisie via the 2025–26 promotion/relegation play-offs. The club was founded on 12 August 1896 as Tilburgia. On 12 January 1898, the club was renamed Willem II after Dutch king William II (1792–1849), who, as Prince of Orange and commander of the Dutch army, had his military headquarters in Tilburg during the Belgian uprising of 1830, spent much time in the city after becoming king, and died there.

Notable former players for the club include Dutch internationals Jan van Roessel, Joris Mathijsen, Jaap Stam, Frenkie de Jong, Marc Overmars, Virgil Van Dijk and Finland's Sami Hyypiä. The club's shirt consists of red-white-blue vertical stripes, inspired by the colours of the flag of the Netherlands. Willem II plays its home matches in the Koning Willem II Stadion, also named after the King. The stadium, opened on 31 May 1995, has a capacity of 14,700 spectators. The average attendance in 2004–05 was 12,500 people.

The club has won the Eredivisie three times, and the Eerste Divisie four times.

== History ==
Established on 12 August 1896 in Tilburg by Marten Evert van Kuiken as Tilburgia, the club first played at the Gemeentelijk Sportpark Tilburg and in 1995 relocated to the Koning Willem II Stadion, the ground where they have played ever since. Willem were champions of the Eredivisie in 1916, 1952 and 1955. The Tricolores also won two KNVB Cups in 1944 and 1963 and were also crowned champs of the Eerste Divisie in 1958, 1965 and 2014.

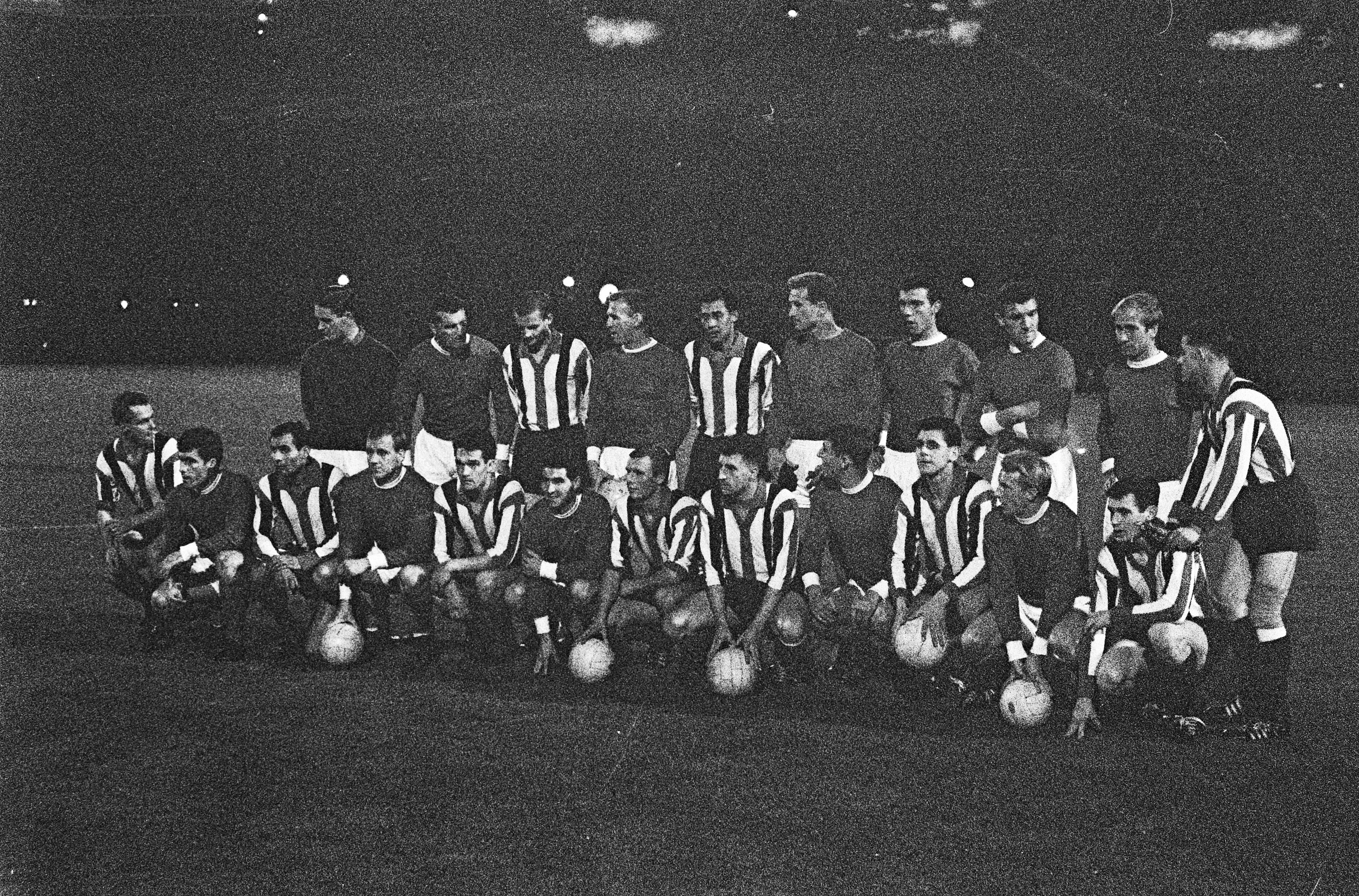
Willem II v Manchester United, 25 September 1963: 1–1

With regard to European competition, Willem II first appeared in 1963–64 European Cup Winners' Cup where they lost to Manchester United in the first round by an aggregate score of 7–2. In 1998–99, Willem next competed in the 1998–99 UEFA Cup and after beating Dinamo Tbilisi of Georgia 3-0 in each leg of the first round, Willem then lost to Spanish side Real Betis in the second round, 4–1 on aggregate. A second place in the Eredivisie of 1999 guaranteed the club a UEFA Champions League berth for the first time. At the tournament's group stage, Willem only attained two points in their six group G matches and were thus eliminated. After reaching the KNVB Cup final in 2005 where they lost 4–0 against PSV Eindhoven, Willem II again qualified again for the UEFA Cup, in which they lost to French side AS Monaco in the first round by 5–1 on aggregate.

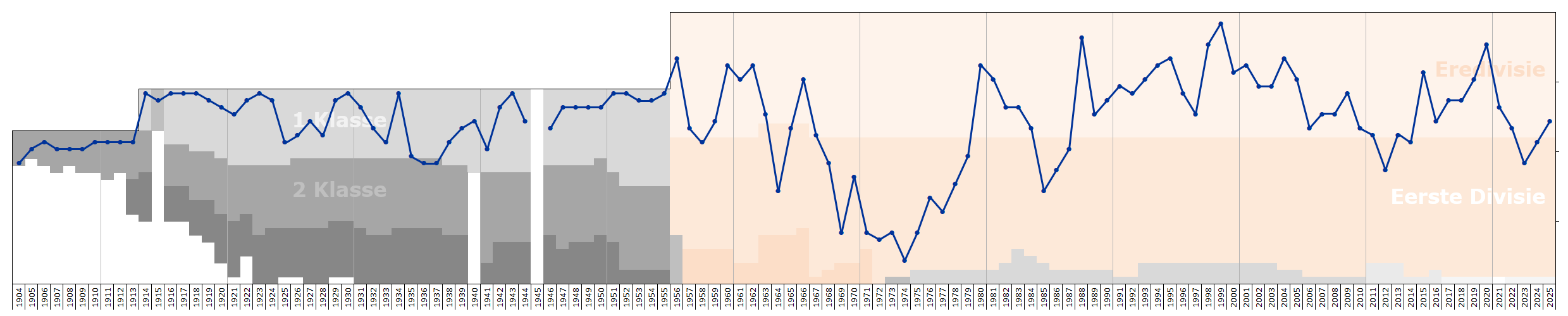
Historical chart of league performance

At the end of the 2010–11 season, Willem II were relegated from the Eredivisie for the first time in 24 years. In the 2011–12 season under new manager Jurgen Streppel Willem II was promoted back to the Eredivisie, but they went right back down the next season after finishing bottom of the table. The club became champions of the Eerste Divisie in the subsequent season and were thus promoted back to the Eredivisie.

In early 2015, journalists at De Volkskrant revealed that Willem II had its matches fixed by an "Asian gambling syndicate", who had paid Willem's players a total sum of €100,000 to lose matches against Ajax and Feyenoord (in October and December 2009). According to the journalists, midfielder Ibrahim Kargbo was the Asians' main contact within the club; Kargbo denies having accepted their money. The Royal Dutch Football Association called the affair "the most concrete case of match fixing in the Netherlands" and took legal action as well as asking UEFA and FIFA to reevaluate previous matches.

In 2019, Willem II reached the KNVB Cup final for the fourth time in their history. They beat AZ Alkmaar in the semi-finals after a penalty shoot-out, but were heavily beaten by in the final by Ajax.

The fans of Willem II have close links with the fans of English championship club Bristol City. Willem supporters have been known to travel to Bristol, with Bristol City fans heading the other way to Tilburg. At Bristol City's game on 31 October 2009 against Sheffield Wednesday, some Willem II fans were seen in the 'Eastend' of the Ashton Gate Stadium, and songs were sung about Willem II by City fans. On 3 August 2024, the teams played each other for the first time in a pre-season friendly at Ashton Gate stadium in Bristol.

== Rivalries ==
Willem II longest-running and deepest rivalry is with their neighbour, NAC Breda. This rivalry originated in the 1920s. Matches between the two are referred to as the derby of Brabant. The two cities of Breda and Tilburg are just 20 kilometres apart, leading to an intense feeling of a cross-town rivalry, heightened by a feeling that it is city against city with local pride at stake.

== Players ==
=== Current squad ===
As of 10 September 2026

Note: Flags indicate national team as defined under FIFA eligibility rules; some limited exceptions apply. Players may hold more than one non-FIFA nationality.

No.	Pos.	Nation	Player
1	GK	FRA	Thomas Didillon-Hödl
2	DF	BEL	Alessandro Ciranni
3	DF	NED	Finn Stam
4	DF	NED	Justin Hoogma (2nd captain)
5	DF	NED	Hidde ter Avest
6	MF	NED	Calvin Twigt
7	FW	NED	Jaden Slory (on loan from Feyenoord)
8	MF	NED	Kasper Boogaard (on loan from AZ Alkmaar)
9	FW	NED	Devin Haen
10	MF	NED	Jari Schuurman (captain)
11	FW	SWE	Armin Ćulum
14	DF	NED	Jens Mathijsen
15	DF	MAR	Amine Et-Taïbi
17	FW	DEN	Chido Obi (on loan from Manchester United U21)
18	MF	NED	Anass Zarrouk

No.	Pos.	Nation	Player
19	MF	NED	Uriël van Aalst
20	MF	NED	Thijs Muller
21	GK	NED	Wouter van der Steen
22	DF	NED	Per van Loon
23	DF	NED	Maxim Dekker
24	DF	IDN	Nathan Tjoe-A-On
26	GK	BEL	Maxime Delanghe (on loan from Cercle Brugge)
28	FW	NED	Thomas Verheydt
31	GK	NED	Karst de Leeuw
32	MF	NED	Vito van Crooij
34	MF	NED	Amine Lachkar
50	FW	NED	Eser Gürbüz (on loan from Heerenveen)
52	MF	NED	Tonny Vilhena
83	DF	BEL	Mats Lemmens

=== Out on loan ===
Note: Flags indicate national team as defined under FIFA eligibility rules; some limited exceptions apply. Players may hold more than one non-FIFA nationality.

No. / Pos. / Nation / Player; — / FW / DEN / Lasse Abildgaard (at Eindhoven until 30 June 2027)	No. / Pos. / Nation / Player; — / FW / NED / Siegert Baartmans (at Eindhoven until 30 June 2027)

== Notable players ==
=== National team players ===
The following players were called up to represent their national teams in international football and received caps during their tenure with Willem II:

- Armenia
  - (Armenia) Norair Aslanyan (2013–2015)
  - (Armenia) Aras Özbiliz (2018–2019)
  Aruba
  - (Aruba) **Mishawn Molina (2025–present)**
  Belgium
  - (Belgium) Tom Caluwé (2000–2006)
  - (Belgium) Geert De Vlieger (2000–2004)
  - (Belgium) Moussa Dembélé (2005–2006)
  Burkina Faso
  - (Burkina Faso) Ousmane Sanou (1996–2001)
  Cape Verde
  - (Cape Verde) Josimar Lima (2009–2011)
  Curaçao
  - (Curaçao) Darryl Lachman (2016–2018)
  - (Curaçao) Charlton Vicento (2014–2015)
  - (Curaçao) Raymond Victoria (1998–2006) (Note: A Dutch-born footballer, Raymond Victoria represented Netherlands Antilles internationally, prior to the countries dissolution in 2010, with Curaçao considered by both UEFA and FIFA as the only inherit successor to the national team of former Netherlands Antilles.)
  - (Curaçao) Jason Wall (2013–2014)
  - (Curaçao) Nuelson Wau (1999–2007; 2009) (Note: A Dutch-born footballer, Nuelson Wau represented Netherlands Antilles internationally, prior to the countries dissolution in 2010, with Curaçao considered by both UEFA and FIFA as the only inherit successor to the national team of former Netherlands Antilles.)
  Czech Republic
  - (Czech Republic) Tomáš Galásek (1996–2000)
  Ecuador
  - (Ecuador) Diego Palacios (2018–2019)
  - (Ecuador) Jhonny Quiñónez (2019)
  Finland
  - (Finland) Sami Hyypiä (1995–1999)
  - (Finland) Joonas Kolkka (1996–1998; 2011–2012)
  - (Finland) Jukka Koskinen (1997–1999)
  - (Finland) Veli Lampi (2010–2011)
  - (Finland) Niki Mäenpää (2009–2011)
  Gambia
  - (The Gambia) Jatto Ceesay (1995–2005)
  Ghana
  - (Ghana) Kwasi Okyere Wriedt (2020–2022)
- Greece
  - (Greece) Vangelis Pavlidis (2019–2021)
  - (Greece) Konstantinos Tsimikas (2017–2018)
  - (Greece) Marios Vrousai (2019–2020)
  Guinea
  - (Guinea) Sékou Soumah (1992–1995)
  - (Guinea) Mohamed Sylla (1989–1995)
  Hungary
  - (Hungary) Csaba Fehér (2005–2006)
  - (Hungary) Zsombor Kerekes (2005–2007)
  Indonesia
  - (Indonesia) **Nathan Tjoe-A-On (2025-present)**
  Israel
  - (Israel) Ben Sahar (2014–2015)
  Kosovo
  - (Kosovo) Donis Avdijaj (2018–2019)
  Luxembourg
  - (Luxembourg) Aurélien Joachim (2012–2013)
  Morocco
  - (Morocco) Youssef Mariana (2000–2004)
  - (Morocco) Adil Ramzi (1998–2000)
  - (Morocco) Tarik Sektioui (2000–2004)
  Netherlands
  - (Netherlands) Tinus van Beurden (1910–1926)
  - (Netherlands) Jan Brooijmans (1954–1967)
  - (Netherlands) Sjel de Bruyckere (1950–1956)
  - (Netherlands) Jan Gielens (1924–1925)
  - (Netherlands) Gerrit Horsten (1922–1925)
  - (Netherlands) Jo Jole (1922–1923)
  - (Netherlands) Coy Koopal (1956–1964)
  - (Netherlands) Denny Landzaat (1999–2003; 2014)
- **Netherlands** (continued)
  - (Netherlands) Huub de Leeuw (1928–1939)
  - (Netherlands) Herman van Loon (1928–1931)
  - (Netherlands) Sjef Mertens (1945–1961)
  - (Netherlands) Toine van Mierlo (1979–1981; 1982–1983)
  - (Netherlands) Harry Mommers (1909–1925)
  - (Netherlands) Jo Mommers (1946–1955)
  - (Netherlands) Jan van Roessel (1951–1957)
  - (Netherlands) Jos van Son (1912–1929)
  - (Netherlands) Piet Stevens (1916–1924)
  - (Netherlands) Henk Vriens (1961–1973)
  New Zealand
  - (New Zealand) James McGarry (2018–2020)
  - (New Zealand) Michael Woud (2018–2021)
  Northern Ireland
  - (Northern Ireland) James Quinn (2002–2005)
  Peru
  - (Peru) Renato Tapia (2019)
  Sierra Leone
  - (Sierra Leone) Ibrahim Kargbo (2006–2010)
  Slovakia
  - (Slovakia) Adam Němec (2015–2016)
  Suriname
  - (Suriname) Jeredy Hilterman (2023–2024)
  Sweden
  - (Sweden) Sebastian Holmén (2019–2021)
  - (Sweden) Alexander Isak (2019)
  United States
  - (United States) Earnie Stewart (1990–1996)

- Players in bold actively play for Willem II and for their respective national teams. Years in brackets indicate careerspan with Willem II.

=== National team players by Confederation ===
Member associations are listed in order of most to fewest current and former Willem II players represented internationally

Total national team players by confederation
Confederation	Total	(Nation) Association
AFC	1	Indonesia (1)
CAF	10	Morocco (3), Guinea (2), Burkina Faso (1), Cape Verde (1), (The Gambia) Gambia (1), Ghana (1), Sierra Leone (1)
CONCACAF	8	Curaçao (5), Aruba (1), Suriname (1), United States (1)
CONMEBOL	3	Ecuador (2), Peru (1)
OFC	2	New Zealand (2)
UEFA	41	Netherlands (18), Finland (5), Belgium (3), Greece (3), Armenia (2), Hungary (2), Sweden (2), Czech Republic (1), Israel (1), Kosovo (1), Luxembourg (1), Northern Ireland (1), Slovakia (1)

== Players in international tournaments ==
The following is a list of Willem II players who have competed in international tournaments, including the FIFA World Cup, UEFA European Championship, CONCACAF Gold Cup, Copa América, Africa Cup of Nations, Amílcar Cabral Cup, and the Caribbean Cup. To this date no Willem II players have participated in the AFC Asian Cup, or the OFC Nations Cup while playing for Willem II.

Cup	Players
(Tunisia) 1994 Africa Cup of Nations	(Guinea) Sékou Soumah (Guinea) Mohamed Sylla
(United States) 1994 FIFA World Cup	(United States) Earnie Stewart
(Uruguay) 1995 Copa América	(United States) Earnie Stewart
(Mauritania) 1995 Amílcar Cabral Cup	(The Gambia) Jatto Ceesay
(Burkina Faso) 1998 Africa Cup of Nations	(Burkina Faso) Ousmane Sanou
(Ghana) (Nigeria) 2000 Africa Cup of Nations	(Morocco) Adil Ramzi (Burkina Faso) Ousmane Sanou
(Belgium) (Netherlands) UEFA Euro 2000	(Belgium) Geert De Vlieger
(South Korea) (Japan) 2002 FIFA World Cup	(Belgium) Geert De Vlieger
(Jamaica) 2014 Caribbean Cup	(Curaçao) Charlton Vicento (Curaçao) Jason Wall
(France) UEFA Euro 2016	(Slovakia) Adam Němec
(Martinique) 2017 Caribbean Cup	(Curaçao) Darryl Lachman
(United States) 2017 CONCACAF Gold Cup	(Curaçao) Darryl Lachman
(Brazil) 2019 Copa América	(Peru) Renato Tapia

== Domestic results ==
17 ↓	1 ↑	16	8	10	8	15 ↓	10	1 ↑	10	18 ↓	4	14	6	14	15	14	18	14	9	11	7	3 ↑	8	10	14	14	17 ↓	8	4	2 ↑	4	15	13	11	12	10	8	7	12	15	5	2	9	8	11	11	7	10	17	15	15	12	17	18 ↓	5 ↑	18 ↓	1 ↑	9	16	13	13	10	5	14	17 ↓	4	1 ↑
57	58	59	60	61	62	63	64	65	66	67	68	69	70	71	72	73	74	75	76	77	78	79	80	81	82	83	84	85	86	87	88	89	90	91	92	93	94	95	96	97	98	99	00	01	02	03	04	05	06	07	08	09	10	11	12	13	14	15	16	17	18	19	20	21	22	23	24
Eredivisie* / Eerste divisie; ↓ relegation ↑ promotion

Below is a table with Willem II's domestic results since the introduction of the Eredivisie in 1956.

Domestic results since 1956
Domestic league	League result	Qualification to	KNVB Cup season	Cup result
1956–57 Eredivisie	18th	Eerste Divisie (relegation)	1956–57	?
1957–58 Eerste Divisie	1st (group A)	Eredivisie (promotion)	1957–58	?
1958–59 Eredivisie	16th	–	1958–59	?
1959–60 Eredivisie	8th	–	not held	not held
1960–61 Eredivisie	10th	–	1960–61	?
1961–62 Eredivisie	8th	–	1961–62	?
1962–63 Eredivisie	15th	Cup Winners' Cup; Eerste Divisie (relegation)	1962–63	winners
1963–64 Eerste Divisie	10th	–	1963–64	second round
1964–65 Eerste Divisie	1st	Eredivisie (promotion)	1964–65	first round
1965–66 Eredivisie	10th	–	1965–66	group stage
1966–67 Eredivisie	18th	Eerste Divisie (relegation)	1966–67	first round
1967–68 Eerste Divisie	4th	–	1967–68	round of 16
1968–69 Eerste Divisie	14th	–	1968–69	first round
1969–70 Eerste Divisie	6th	–	1969–70	second round
1970–71 Eerste Divisie	14th	–	1970–71	second round
1971–72 Eerste Divisie	15th	–	1971–72	first round
1972–73 Eerste Divisie	14th	–	1972–73	second round
1973–74 Eerste Divisie	18th	–	1973–74	round of 16
1974–75 Eerste Divisie	14th	–	1974–75	first round
1975–76 Eerste Divisie	9th	–	1975–76	first round
1976–77 Eerste Divisie	11th	–	1976–77	round of 16
1977–78 Eerste Divisie	7th	–	1977–78	first round
1978–79 Eerste Divisie	3rd	Eredivisie (winning promotion/releg. play-offs)	1978–79	second round
1979–80 Eredivisie	8th	–	1979–80	second round
1980–81 Eredivisie	10th	–	1980–81	quarter-final
1981–82 Eredivisie	14th	–	1981–82	second round
1982–83 Eredivisie	14th	–	1982–83	second round
1983–84 Eredivisie	17th	Eerste Divisie (relegation)	1983–84	first round
1984–85 Eerste Divisie	8th	–	1984–85	first round
1985–86 Eerste Divisie	5th	promotion/relegation play-offs: no promotion	1985–86	first round
1986–87 Eerste Divisie	2nd	Eredivisie (promotion)	1986–87	first round
1987–88 Eredivisie	4th	– (losing UC play-offs)	1987–88	quarter-final
1988–89 Eredivisie	15th	–	1988–89	semi-final
1989–90 Eredivisie	13th	–	1989–90	semi-final
1990–91 Eredivisie	11th	–	1990–91	quarter-final
1991–92 Eredivisie	12th	–	1991–92	third round
1992–93 Eredivisie	10th	–	1992–93	third round
1993–94 Eredivisie	8th	–	1993–94	round of 16
1994–95 Eredivisie	7th	–	1994–95	round of 16
1995–96 Eredivisie	12th	–	1995–96	second round
1996–97 Eredivisie	15th	–	1996–97	semi-final
1997–98 Eredivisie	5th	UEFA Cup	1997–98	round of 16
1998–99 Eredivisie	2nd	Champions League	1998–99	second round
1999–2000 Eredivisie	9th	–	1999–2000	quarter-final
2000–01 Eredivisie	8th	–	2000–01	second round
2001–02 Eredivisie	11th	Intertoto Cup (R2)	2001–02	second round
2002–03 Eredivisie	11th	Intertoto Cup (R2)	2002–03	third round
2003–04 Eredivisie	7th	–	2003–04	round of 16
2004–05 Eredivisie	10th	UEFA Cup	2004–05	final
2005–06 Eredivisie	17th	– (surviving promotion/relegation play-offs)	2005–06	round of 16
2006–07 Eredivisie	15th	–	2006–07	quarter-final
2007–08 Eredivisie	15th	–	2007–08	second round
2008–09 Eredivisie	12th	–	2008–09	third round
2009–10 Eredivisie	17th	– (surviving promotion/relegation play-offs)	2009–10	second round
2010–11 Eredivisie	18th	Eerste Divisie (relegation)	2010–11	third round
2011–12 Eerste Divisie	5th	Eredivisie (winning promotion/relegation play-offs)	2011–12	second round
2012–13 Eredivisie	18th	Eerste Divisie (relegation)	2012–13	second round
2013–14 Eerste Divisie	1st	Eredivisie (promotion)	2013–14	second round
2014–15 Eredivisie	9th	–	2014–15	second round
2015–16 Eredivisie	16th	– (surviving promotion/relegation play-offs)	2015–16	round of 16
2016–17 Eredivisie	13th	–	2016–17	first round
2017–18 Eredivisie	13th	–	2017–18	semi-final
2018–19 Eredivisie	10th	–	2018–19	final
2019–20 Eredivisie	5th	Europa League (Q2)	2019–20	round of 16
2020–21 Eredivisie	14th	–	2020–21	second round
2021–22 Eredivisie	17th	Eerste Divisie (relegation)	2021–22	first round
2022–23 Eerste Divisie	4th	promotion/relegation play-offs: no promotion	2022–23	first round
2023–24 Eerste Divisie	1st	Eredivisie (promotion)	2023–24	second round

== Club officials ==
Position	Staff
Head coach	(Netherlands) Jurgen Streppel
Assistant coach	(Netherlands) Danny Schenkel
Goalkeeper coach	(Netherlands) Kevin Swarthoff
Data and Video analyst	(Netherlands) Rick Mennes
Chief scout	(Netherlands) Steven Aptroot
Club doctor	(Netherlands) Jan de Waal Malefijt (Netherlands) Pieter Vioen
Physiotherapist	(Netherlands) Gijs van der Bom
Manual therapist	(Netherlands) Jasper de Langen
Team official	(Netherlands) Henry van Amelsfort
Manager	(Netherlands) Jos de Kruif
Team Manager	(Netherlands) Gijs de Bont
Kit Manager	(Netherlands) Paul Coehorst (Netherlands) Guus Bierings
Performance manager	(Germany) Nils Thörner
Technical director	(Netherlands) Freek Heerkens
General director	(Netherlands) Merijn Goris

== Coaches ==
Year	Coach
1949–1956	(Czechoslovakia) František Fadrhonc
1956–1962	(Austria) Heinrich "Wudi" Müller
1963–1966, 1967–1971	(Netherlands) Jaap van der Leck
1971–1972	(Netherlands) Henk Wullems
July 1980–June 1982	(Netherlands) Bert Jacobs
1982	(Netherlands) George Knobel
1982–1984	(Netherlands) Jan Brouwer
1984–1985	(Netherlands) Jan Notermans
July 1985–June 1990	(Netherlands) Piet de Visser
1990–91	(Netherlands) Adrie Koster
July 1991–Oct 1991	(Netherlands) Piet de Visser
Oct 1991–March 1995	(Netherlands) Jan Reker
March 1995–June 1996	(Netherlands) Theo de Jong
July 1996–June 1997	(Scotland) Jimmy Calderwood
July 1997–May 2000	(Netherlands) Co Adriaanse
May 2000–June 2000	(Netherlands) Hans Verèl (interim)
July 2000–June 2002	(Netherlands) Hans Westerhof
July 2002–Jan 2004	(Netherlands) Mark Wotte
Feb 2004–June 2004	(Netherlands) André Wetzel

Year	Coach
July 2004–Nov 2005	(Netherlands) Robert Maaskant
Nov 2005–June 2006	(Netherlands) Kees Zwamborn
July 2006–Nov 2007	(Netherlands) Dennis van Wijk
Nov 2007–Feb 2009	(Netherlands) Andries Jonker
Feb 2009–Feb 2010	(Netherlands) Alfons Groenendijk
Feb 2010	(Netherlands) Mark Schenning (interim)
Feb 2010–April 2010	(Netherlands) Arno Pijpers
April 2010–May 2010	(Netherlands) Theo de Jong (interim)
July 2010–April 2011	(Netherlands) Gert Heerkes
April 2011–June 2011	(Netherlands) John Feskens (interim)
July 2011–May 2016	(Netherlands) Jurgen Streppel
July 2016–March 2018	(Netherlands) Erwin van de Looi
March 2018–May 2018	(Netherlands) Reinier Robbemond (interim)
July 2018–January 2021	(Netherlands) Adrie Koster
January 2021–June 2021	(Montenegro) Željko Petrović
July 2021–March 2022	(Netherlands) Fred Grim
March 2022–December 2022	(Netherlands) Kevin Hofland
December 2022-September 2023	(Netherlands) Reinier Robbemond
September 2023–April 2025	(Belgium) Peter Maes
April 2025-June 2025	(Belgium) Kristof Aelbrecht (interim)
July 2025-Present	(Netherlands) John Stegeman

== Honours ==
- National Football League Championship/Eredivisie
  - Winners (3): 1915–16, 1951–52, 1954–55
  - Runners-up (1): 1998–99
- Eerste Divisie
  - Winners (4): 1956–57, 1964–65, 2013–14, 2023–24
  - Runners-up (1): 1986–87
- KNVB Cup
  - Winners (2): 1943–44, 1962–63
  - Runners-up (2): 2004–05, 2018–19

== See also ==
- Dutch football league teams
