= David Breda =

David Breda may refer to:

- David Breda (footballer, born 1971), Czech footballer
- David Breda (footballer, born 1996), Czech footballer
