= Vegard Heggem =

Norwegian footballer (born 1975)

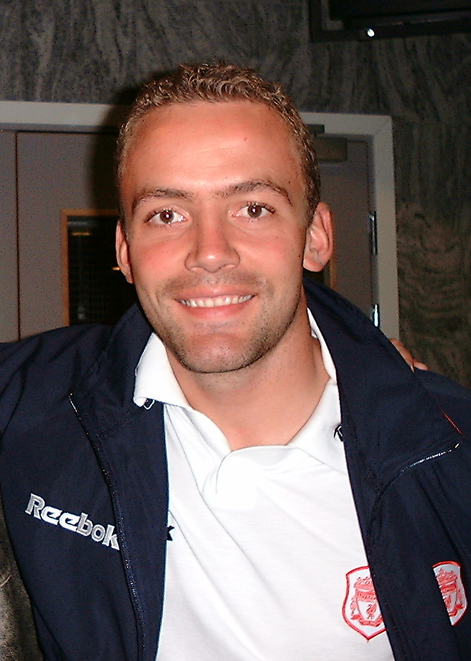
- Heggem with Liverpool in 1999

Personal information
- Date of birth: 13 July 1975 (age 51)
- Place of birth: Trondheim, Trøndelag, Norway
- Height: 1.80 m (5 ft 11 in)
- Position: Right back

Youth career
- 1982–1991: Rennebu IL
- 1992–1994: Orkdal IL

Senior career*
Years	Team	Apps	(Gls)
1991	Rennebu IL	20	(4)
1992–1994	Orkdal IL	68	(26)
1995–1998	Rosenborg	57	(5)
1998–2003	Liverpool	54	(3)
Total		199	(38)

International career
1995–1998	Norway U-21	18	(1)
1998–2000	Norway	20	(1)
- * Club domestic league appearances and goals

Vegard Heggem (born 13 July 1975) is a Norwegian former professional footballer who played as a right back. He rose to prominence with Rosenborg, winning three league titles and a cup, and scoring a goal to knock Milan out of the UEFA Champions League. In 1998, he joined Liverpool, but was troubled by injury during his five seasons there before retiring. In a two-year international career, Heggem earned 20 caps for Norway, scoring once in his debut match. He was part of their squads at the 1998 FIFA World Cup and UEFA Euro 2000.

== Club career ==
Heggem made his professional debut with Rosenborg on 21 April 1995 against Kongsvinger in the Norwegian Premier League. He is best remembered by some for the goal in the away match against Milan in the 1996–97 UEFA Champions League when Rosenborg sensationally beat the Italian giants, thereby advancing to the Champions League quarter-finals and at the same time knocking Milan out of the tournament.

After the 1998 FIFA World Cup, Heggem transferred to Liverpool for £3.5 million. His first two seasons at Anfield were successful, but he was plagued by hamstring injuries. He was the player substituted when Steven Gerrard made his Premier League debut for the club on 29 November 1998 in a 2–0 win over Blackburn Rovers. After being injured in the 2000 European Championship he made only four appearances for Liverpool during the 2000–01 treble-winning season, and he made no appearances at all during his last two years at the club.

Heggem left Liverpool when his contract ended in the summer of 2003, and shortly thereafter retired from football at the age of 28. He played his last game of football at the age of just 25.

== International career ==
Heggem made his national team debut on 25 February 1998 against France, scoring a goal in the 3–3 draw at the Stade Vélodrome in Marseille. He was selected for the 1998 FIFA World Cup squad, but spent the entire tournament on the substitutes' bench as Norway reached the last 16. He played in the 2000 UEFA European Football Championship, playing the full 90 minutes in Norway's opening 1–0 win over Spain at De Kuip in Rotterdam. However, in the second match against FR Yugoslavia, he left the pitch injured after 35 minutes to be replaced by his Liverpool teammate Stig Inge Bjørnebye, and Norway eventually were eliminated.

== Legacy ==
In the 2002 book Folkets Fotballbok. De største øyeblikkene (The People's Football Book. The Greatest Moments) (ISBN 82-994467-2-4), penned by sports writer Oddleiv Moe, his goal against Milan at the San Siro was named one of the twelve greatest moments in Norwegian football history. The chapter devoted to his goal was named Mirakelet på San Siro (The miracle at San Siro).

== Personal life ==
Until the end of the 2020 salmon fishing season Heggem ran the salmon fishing business Aunan Lodge on the river Orkla in Trøndelag. Heggem still owns the property but the new tenants will continue the operation under the name Grindal Salmon Lodge. He is also an official patron of A.F.C. Liverpool, an independent football club owned and run by Liverpool supporters. He is also a regular at Liverpool home matches, and was also at the 2005 UEFA Champions League Final in Istanbul.

In February 2012, the AGM of Rosenborg elected Vegard Heggem as a member of the board for a period of two years. Heggem decided not to stand for reelection when his fourth term ended in 2020.

== Career statistics ==
=== Club ===
Club	Season	League			Cup		Europe		Total	
Club	Season	Division	Apps	Goals	Apps	Goals	Apps	Goals	Apps	Goals
Rosenborg	1995	Tippeligaen	15	1	8	2	6	1	29	4
Rosenborg	1996	Tippeligaen	14	1	2	0	7	2	23	3
Rosenborg	1997	Tippeligaen	23	3	3	0	10	0	36	3
Rosenborg	1998	Tippeligaen	5	0	2	0	0	0	7	0
Rosenborg	Total		57	5	15	2	23	3	95	10
Liverpool	1998–99	Premier League	29	2	2	0	5	0	36	2
Liverpool	1999–2000	Premier League	22	1	3	0	—		25	1
Liverpool	2000–01	Premier League	3	0	0	0	1	0	4	0
Liverpool	2001–02	Premier League	0	0	0	0	0	0	0	0
Liverpool	2002–03	Premier League	0	0	0	0	0	0	0	0
Liverpool	Total		54	3	5	0	6	0	65	3
Career total			111	8	20	2	29	3	160	13

=== International ===
Appearances and goals by national team and year

National team	Year	Apps	Goals
Norway	1998	6	1
Norway	1999	9	0
Norway	2000	5	0
Norway	Total	20	1

Scores and results list Norway's goal tally first.

International goals

No.	Date	Venue	Opponent	Score	Result	Competition
1	25 February 1998	Stade Vélodrome, Marseille, France	France	3–2	3–3	Friendly

== Honours ==
Rosenborg

- Norwegian Premier League: 1995, 1996, 1997,
- Norwegian Cup: 1995

Liverpool

- UEFA Cup: 2001
