= 2000–01 Liverpool F.C. season =

English football club season

Liverpool F.C.
2000–01 season
- Chairman: David Moores
- Manager: Gérard Houllier
- FA Premier League: 3rd
- FA Cup: Winners
- League Cup: Winners
- UEFA Cup: Winners
- Top goalscorer: League: Michael Owen (16); All: Michael Owen (24)
- Average home league attendance: 42,768
Home colours	Away colours	Third colours

The 2000–2001 season was Liverpool Football Club's 109th season in existence and their 39th consecutive season in the top-flight of English football. This season proved highly successful for Liverpool, with them picking up the League Cup, UEFA Cup and FA Cup under Gerard Houllier, having finished 3rd in the league.

== Season summary ==
Liverpool enjoyed their most successful season for years when they completed a unique treble of cup competitions and ended Gérard Houllier's three-year wait to bring silverware to Anfield. The last time they had won silverware was the Coca Cola Cup in the 1994–95 season.

The first trophy was secured on 25 February when a 5–4 penalty shoot-out victory followed a 1–1 draw with Birmingham City in the Worthington Cup final. The game was also the first club fixture to be played at Cardiff's Millennium Stadium while Wembley was being rebuilt. Part two of the treble was completed on 12 May when two late Michael Owen goals overturned Arsenal's lead in the FA Cup final to give the Reds a 2–1 win. The final part of the treble was perhaps the most dramatic. The UEFA Cup final featured nine goals as Alavés fought back to equalize from 3–1 and 4–3, before Liverpool finally ran out 5–4 winners after extra-time. The FA and UEFA cup wins meant Liverpool played in the Charity Shield and UEFA Super Cup at the start of the next season, winning both.

Midfielder Steven Gerrard was voted PFA Young Player of the Year for his key part in one of the most successful seasons in Liverpool's 109-year history, and contributions from British stars Michael Owen, Robbie Fowler, Jamie Carragher, Danny Murphy and new signings Gary McAllister and Emile Heskey were matched by an increasingly continental side consisting of new captain Sami Hyypiä, Sander Westerveld, Jari Litmanen and Dietmar Hamann.

Just after the end of the season, former manager Joe Fagan (manager of the 1984 side that also managed to win three trophies in a season) died at the age of 80 after a long illness.

== Players ==
=== First-team squad ===
No.	Player	Nationality	Date of birth	Signed from
Goalkeepers
1	Sander Westerveld	(Netherlands)	23 October 1974 (aged 25)	(Netherlands) Vitesse
19	Pegguy Arphexad	(Guadeloupe)	18 May 1973 (aged 27)	(England) Leicester City
26	Jørgen Nielsen	(Denmark)	6 May 1971 (aged 29)	(Denmark) Hvidovre
Defenders
2	Stephane Henchoz	(Switzerland)	7 September 1974 (aged 25)	(England) Blackburn Rovers
3	Christian Ziege	(Germany)	1 February 1972 (aged 28)	(England) Middlesbrough
6	Markus Babbel	(Germany)	8 September 1972 (aged 27)	(Germany) Bayern Munich
12	Sami Hyypia	(Finland)	7 October 1973 (aged 26)	(Netherlands) Willem II
14	Vegard Heggem	(Norway)	13 July 1975 (aged 24)	(Norway) Rosenborg
23	Jamie Carragher	(England)	28 January 1978 (aged 22)	(England) LFC Academy
27	Gregory Vignal	(France)	19 July 1981 (aged 18)	(France) Montpellier
29	Stephen Wright	(England)	8 February 1980 (aged 20)	(England) LFC Academy
30	Djimi Traore	(Mali)	1 March 1980 (aged 20)	(France) Stade Lavallois
31	Frode Kippe	(Norway)	17 January 1978 (aged 22)	(Norway) Lillestrom
Midfielders
7	Vladimir Smicer	(Czech Republic)	24 May 1973 (aged 27)	(France) RC Lens
11	Jamie Redknapp	(England)	25 June 1973 (aged 27)	(England) Bournemouth
13	Danny Murphy	(England)	18 March 1977 (aged 23)	(England) Crewe Alexandra
15	Patrik Berger	(Czech Republic)	10 November 1973 (aged 26)	(Germany) Borussia Dortmund
16	Dietmar Hamann	(Germany)	27 August 1973 (aged 26)	(England) Newcastle United
17	Steven Gerrard	(England)	30 May 1980 (aged 20)	(England) LFC Academy
20	Nick Barmby	(England)	11 February 1974 (aged 26)	(England) Everton
21	Gary McAllister	(Scotland)	25 December 1964 (aged 35)	(England) Coventry City
24	Bernard Diomède	(France)	23 January 1974 (aged 26)	(France) Auxerre
25	Igor Biscan	(Croatia)	4 May 1978 (aged 22)	(Croatia) Dinamo Zagreb
28	Richie Partridge	(Republic of Ireland)	12 September 1980 (aged 19)	(Republic of Ireland) Stella Maris
33	Alan Navarro	(England)	31 May 1981 (aged 19)	(England) LFC Academy
Forwards
8	Emile Heskey	(England)	11 January 1978 (aged 22)	(England) Leicester City
9	Robbie Fowler	(England)	9 April 1975 (aged 25)	(England) LFC Academy
10	Michael Owen	(England)	14 December 1979 (aged 20)	(England) LFC Academy
37	Jari Litmanen	(Finland)	20 February 1971 (aged 29)	(Spain) Barcelona
38	Daniel Sjolund	(Finland)	22 April 1983 (aged 17)	(England) West Ham United

== Transfers ==
=== In ===
Date	Pos.	No.	Player	From	Fee
7 June 2000	MF	24	(France) Bernard Diomède	(France) Auxerre	£3,000,000
1 July 2000	MF	21	(Scotland) Gary McAllister	(England) Coventry City	Free Transfer
1 July 2000	GK	19	(France) Pegguy Arphexad	(England) Leicester City	Free Transfer
1 July 2000	DF	6	(Germany) Markus Babbel	(Germany) Bayern Munich	Free Transfer
18 July 2000	MF	20	(England) Nick Barmby	(England) Everton	£6,000,000
25 July 2000	DF	3	(Germany) Christian Ziege	(England) Middlesbrough	£5,500,000
22 September 2000	DF	27	(France) Gregory Vignal	(France) Montpellier	£500,000
28 November 2000	FW	38	(Finland) Daniel Sjolund	(England) West Ham United	£1,300,000
7 December 2000	MF	25	(Croatia) Igor Biscan	(Croatia) Dinamo Zagreb	£5,500,000
4 January 2001	FW	37	(Finland) Jari Litmanen	(Spain) Barcelona	Free Transfer

=== Out ===
Date	Pos.	No.	Player	To	Fee
26 June 2000	DF	20	(Norway) Stig Inge Bjornebye	(England) Blackburn Rovers	£300,000
1 July 2000	DF	6	(Republic of Ireland) Phil Babb	(Portugal) Sporting CP	Free Transfer
3 August 2000	MF	25	(England) David Thompson	(England) Coventry City	£2,750,000
18 August 2000	DF	21	(Scotland) Dominic Matteo	(England) Leeds United	£4,750,000
3 November 2000	GK	19	(United States) Brad Friedel	(England) Blackburn Rovers	Free Transfer
28 November 2000	DF	4	(Cameroon) Rigobert Song	(England) West Ham United	£2,500,000
6 December 2000	DF	5	(Republic of Ireland) Steve Staunton	(England) Aston Villa	Free Transfer
11 December 2000	FW	18	(Netherlands) Erik Meijer	(Germany) Hamburg	Free Transfer
21 December 2000	FW	22	(Guinea) Titi Camara	(England) West Ham United	£2,600,000
27 December 2000	FW	27	(Iceland) Haukur Ingi Guðnason	(Iceland) Keflavik	Free Transfer
20 March 2001	FW	32	(England) Jon Newby	(England) Bury	£100,000

== Events of the season ==
=== August ===
Gérard Houllier prepared for his third season at the Liverpool helm, looking to improve on the fourth-place finish of the previous campaign which had seen the Reds having to settle for a place in the UEFA Cup when they had come so close to qualifying for the UEFA Champions League.

The campaign began with a 1–0 home win over relegation favourites Bradford City, who had defeated Liverpool last season to deny the Reds Champions League qualification; Emile Heskey scored the only goal of the game. A 2–0 defeat at Arsenal followed, before a thrilling 3–3 draw at Southampton in which Michael Owen was on target twice.

=== September ===
September began well with good home wins over Aston Villa and Manchester City. The European adventure then began with a 1–0 away win over Romanian side Rapid București in the first round first leg of the UEFA Cup. The return to league action saw 1–1 draws with West Ham United and Sunderland. The month ended with a goalless home draw in the return leg against Rapid București to ensure progression to the next stage of the competition.

=== October ===
October began badly for Liverpool, who found themselves on the receiving end of a 3–0 defeat by Chelsea in the league. Two weeks later, however, an Emile Heskey hat-trick gave them a 4–0 win at Derby County which put them in fourth place, four points behind leaders Manchester United and second placed Arsenal and a point behind third placed Leicester City. Heskey was on target in the next two games that month – a 1–0 win over Slovan Liberec in the UEFA Cup second round first leg at Anfield and the 3–1 win over Everton in the Merseyside derby, also at Anfield.

=== November ===
November brought mixed results for the Reds. Their Football League Cup quest began in the third round with a 2–1 win over Chelsea after extra time. This was followed by a 4–3 league defeat to Leeds United at Elland Road. In the second round second leg of the UEFA Cup, the Reds eliminated Slovan Liberec to reach the third round. There was also an impressive 4–1 home win over Coventry City in the league, followed by 2–1 defeats at Tottenham Hotspur and Newcastle United, and finally an 8–0 away demolition of Division Two side Stoke City in the fourth round of the League Cup. Liverpool were still a healthy fifth in the league but were now 12 points adrift of leaders Manchester United, in turn eight points ahead of nearest contenders Arsenal.

=== December ===
December was a generally good month for the Reds, who began with a 3–0 home win over Charlton Athletic before overcoming Olympiacos in the UEFA Cup third round. Liverpool then suffering a shock 1–0 home defeat at the hands of surprise title outsiders Ipswich Town, only promoted the previous season. A Danny Murphy goal gave them a 1–0 away win over Manchester United two days before Christmas, though it did little to alter the decision of many bookmakers by this stage of the season to re-open the books on the title race, as so many of them were now certain that United would win their third successive title. The year ended with a 1–0 defeat to Middlesbrough at the Riverside Stadium on Boxing Day. The Reds ended the year in sixth place, occupying the European places along with leaders Manchester United, and the top five clubs Arsenal, Sunderland, Leicester City and Ipswich Town.

=== January ===
2001 started with a 2–1 home win over Southampton, followed by a 3–0 home win over Rotherham United in the FA Cup third round. Then came a surprise 2–1 defeat by Division One strugglers Crystal Palace in the League Cup semi-final first leg at Selhurst Park, though the Reds were rampant 5–0 winners in the return leg at Anfield 14 days later to book their place in the final with Birmingham City and be presented with the opportunity to win the trophy for a record sixth time. There was also an excellent 3–0 away win over Aston Villa in the league in mid January, as well as a 2–0 win at Leeds United in the FA Cup fourth round. The month ended with a 1–1 draw against strugglers Manchester City at Maine Road. Liverpool now stood fourth in the league, with Manchester United now 15 points ahead of nearest contenders Arsenal, 16 points clear of third placed Sunderland and 18 points clear of Liverpool. Though the league was now surely beyond Liverpool's (and indeed any other team's) reach, the Reds still had three cups to play for.

=== February ===
February began with an impressive 3–0 home win over struggling West Ham United and a 1–1 draw at Sunderland. Then came the return to European action – a 2–0 away win over Roma in the UEFA Cup fourth round, in which Michael Owen scored both goals. Then came a 4–2 home win over Manchester City in the FA Cup fifth round. Then came the second leg of the game against Roma, which the Reds lost 1–0 at Anfield, still enough for Liverpool to progress to the quarter-finals.

The League Cup final on 25 February was to be the first domestic cup final to be playing beyond England's borders: Wembley Stadium had closed for rebuilding in October 2000 and, until the revamped stadium was ready, all major finals in English football would be held at the Millennium Stadium in Cardiff, Wales. Robbie Fowler put the Reds ahead against Birmingham City after 30 minutes, only for the Division One midlanders to equalise later. With extra time played, the scores were still level and so the game went to penalties – a first for an English cup final. Liverpool won the shoot-out to end their six-year wait for a major trophy, their longest major trophy wait since the early 1960s.

=== March ===
Liverpool began March with a 2–0 defeat at Leicester City before travelling to Portugal for the UEFA Cup quarter final first leg with Porto, which ended in a goalless draw. Then came the all-Merseyside FA Cup quarter-final – not against Everton, but against Wirral-based Tranmere Rovers, managed by former Liverpool striker John Aldridge. The Reds won 4–2 at Prenton Park, marking the end of a complicated story for Tranmere, who were on their way to relegation from Division One – and for Aldridge, who left the club within weeks of this game. Four days later, Porto travelled to Anfield for the quarter-final second leg, which the Reds won 2–0. The remaining games that month were a 1–1 home draw with struggling Derby County and a 2–0 home win over Manchester United, which did little except prolong United's wait for their inevitable third straight league title.

=== April ===
With Manchester United confirmed as FA Premier League champions on 14 April, most eyes were off the Premier League as Liverpool looked to add the FA Cup and UEFA Cup to their earlier League Cup triumph. The FA Cup semi-final at Villa Park on 8 April was against Division Two surprise package Wycombe Wanderers (in only their eighth season as a Football League club) and the Reds only narrowly managed to beat them with a slender 2–1 win. The UEFA Cup semi final first leg with Barcelona saw a goalless draw at the Camp Nou, before a penalty by 36-year-old Gary McAllister in the return leg at Anfield put the Reds through to their first post-Heysel European final.

=== May ===
After securing a third-place finish in the league and qualification for the Champions League for the first time in the post-Heysel era, the Reds enjoyed one of their finest months ever by completing a unique treble of the League Cup (won in late February), FA Cup and UEFA Cup. The FA Cup was snatched from the jaws of defeat when two late goals from Michael Owen overturned Arsenal's 1–0 lead in the final minutes of the game. The treble was completed four days later when a thrilling match against Alavés of Spain gave them a 5–4 victory in the UEFA Cup final.

== Pre-season and friendlies ==
Date	Opponents	H / A	Result F–A	Scorers
22 July 2000	Stoke City	A	0–1	
29 July 2000	SC Freiburg	A	4–1	Barmby 18', Heskey 40', Owen 54', Staunton 74'
3 August 2000	Glentoran	A	4–0	Fowler 9', Berger 43', Šmicer 44', Murphy 61'
5 August 2000	Benfica	N	2–2	Camara 10', Owen 48'
10 August 2000	Valerenga	A	1–1 (2–4 p)	Šmicer 22'
13 August 2000	Parma	H	5–0	Hamann 29', Barmby 38', McAllister 59', Owen 64' (pen.), 84'

== Competitions ==
=== FA Premier League ===
==== League table ====
Pos	Team	Pld	W	D	L	GF	GA	GD	Pts	Qualification or relegation
1	Manchester United (C)	38	24	8	6	79	31	+48	80	Qualification for the Champions League first group stage
2	Arsenal	38	20	10	8	63	38	+25	70	Qualification for the Champions League first group stage
3	Liverpool	38	20	9	9	71	39	+32	69	Qualification for the Champions League third qualifying round (Note: Since Liverpool won the League Cup and qualified for the Champions League, their UEFA Cup place went to fifth-placed Ipswich Town. Since both FA Cup finalists, Liverpool and Arsenal, qualified for the Champions League, the berth in the UEFA Cup went to sixth-placed Chelsea. Both Ipswich and Chelsea were the highest-ranked team not already qualified for a European competition.)
4	Leeds United	38	20	8	10	64	43	+21	68	Qualification for the UEFA Cup first round
5	Ipswich Town	38	20	6	12	57	42	+15	66	Qualification for the UEFA Cup first round

Source: Premier League
Rules for classification: 1) points; 2) goal difference; 3) number of goals scored.
(C) Champions

==== Results by round ====
Round	1	2	3	4	5	6	7	8	9	10	11	12	13	14	15	16	17	18	19	20	21	22	23	24	25	26	27	28	29	30	31	32	33	34	35	36	37	38
Ground	H	A	A	H	H	A	H	A	A	H	H	A	H	A	A	H	H	A	H	A	A	A	H	A	H	A	A	H	H	A	H	A	H	A	A	H	H	A
Result	W	L	D	W	W	D	D	L	W	W	W	L	W	L	L	W	L	W	W	L	W	W	D	D	W	D	L	D	W	D	L	W	W	W	W	W	D	W
Position	7	14	12	6	5	4	4	8	6	3	3	4	3	4	6	4	6	5	4	6	4	3	2	2	2	2	3	3	3	3	3	3	5	5	5	4	3	3

Source: Competitive Matches
A = Away; H = Home; W = Win; D = Draw; L = Loss

==== Matches ====
19 August 2000 1	Liverpool	1–0	Bradford City	Liverpool, Merseyside
	Heskey 67'	Report		Stadium: Anfield; Attendance: 44,183; Referee: Paul Durkin

21 August 2000 2	Arsenal	2–0	Liverpool	London
	Lauren 8'; Henry 89'	Report		Stadium: Highbury; Attendance: 38,014; Referee: Graham Poll

26 August 2000 3	Southampton	3–3	Liverpool	Southampton
	Pahars 73', 90'; El Khalej 85'	Report	Owen 24', 64'; Hyypiä 55'	Stadium: The Dell; Attendance: 15,202; Referee: Jeff Winter

6 September 2000 4	Liverpool	3–1	Aston Villa	Liverpool, Merseyside
	Owen 5', 14', 33'	Report	Stone 83'	Stadium: Anfield; Attendance: 43,360; Referee: Neale Barry

9 September 2000 5	Liverpool	3–2	Manchester City	Liverpool, Merseyside
	Owen 11'; Hamann 56', 82'	Report	Weah 67'; Horlock 81' (pen.)	Stadium: Anfield; Attendance: 44,692; Referee: Graham Barber

17 September 2000 6	West Ham United	1–1	Liverpool	Newham, London
	Di Canio 69' (pen.)	Report	Gerrard 12'	Stadium: Upton Park; Attendance: 25,998; Referee: David Elleray

23 September 2000 7	Liverpool	1–1	Sunderland	Liverpool, Merseyside
	Owen 30'	Report	Phillips 14'	Stadium: Anfield; Attendance: 44,713; Referee: Mike Riley

1 October 2000 8	Chelsea	3–0	Liverpool	Fulham, London
	Westerveld 10' (o.g.); Hasselbaink 11'; Guðjohnsen 71'	Report		Stadium: Stamford Bridge; Attendance: 34,966; Referee: Dermot Gallagher

15 October 2000 9	Derby County	0–4	Liverpool	Derby, Derbyshire
		Report	Heskey 17', 54', 67'; Berger 80'	Stadium: Pride Park Stadium; Attendance: 30,532; Referee: Steve Bennett

21 October 2000 10	Liverpool	1–0	Leicester City	Liverpool, Merseyside
	Heskey 69'	Report		Stadium: Anfield; Attendance: 44,395; Referee: Andy D'Urso

29 October 2000 11	Liverpool	3–1	Everton	Liverpool, Merseyside
	Barmby 12'; Heskey 55'; Berger 78' (pen.)	Report	Campbell 17'	Stadium: Anfield; Attendance: 44,718; Referee: Paul Durkin

4 November 2000 12	Leeds United	4–3	Liverpool	Leeds, West Yorkshire
	Viduka 24', 46', 73', 75'	Report	Hyypiä 2'; Ziege 18'; Šmicer 61'	Stadium: Elland Road; Attendance: 40,055; Referee: David Elleray

12 November 2000 13	Liverpool	4–1	Coventry City	Liverpool, Merseyside
	McAllister 13'; Gerrard 51'; Heskey 82', 87'	Report	Thompson 56'	Stadium: Anfield; Attendance: 43,701; Referee: Mike Riley

19 November 2000 14	Tottenham Hotspur	2–1	Liverpool	Haringey, London
	Ferdinand 31'; Sherwood 40'	Report	Fowler 17'	Stadium: White Hart Lane; Attendance: 36,036; Referee: Mark Halsey

26 November 2000 15	Newcastle United	2–1	Liverpool	Newcastle-upon-Tyne, Tyneside
	Solano 4'; Dyer 70'	Report	Heskey 78'	Stadium: St. James' Park; Attendance: 51,949; Referee: Barry Knight

2 December 2000 16	Liverpool	3–0	Charlton Athletic	Liverpool, Merseyside
	Fish 5' (o.g.); Heskey 78'; Babbel 90'	Report		Stadium: Anfield; Attendance: 43,515; Referee: Rob Styles

10 December 2000 17	Liverpool	0–1	Ipswich Town	Liverpool, Merseyside
		Report	Stewart 45'	Stadium: Anfield; Attendance: 43,509; Referee: Alan Wiley

17 December 2000 18	Manchester United	0–1	Liverpool	Trafford, Greater Manchester
		Report	Murphy 43'	Stadium: Old Trafford; Attendance: 67,533; Referee: Mike Riley

23 December 2000 19	Liverpool	4–0	Arsenal	Liverpool, Merseyside
	Gerrard 12'; Owen 62'; Barmby 71'; Fowler 84'	Report		Stadium: Anfield; Attendance: 44,144; Referee: Paul Durkin

26 December 2000 20	Middlesbrough	1–0	Liverpool	Middlesbrough, North Yorkshire
	Karembeu 44'	Report		Stadium: Riverside Stadium; Attendance: 34,696; Referee: Stephen Lodge

1 January 2001 21	Liverpool	2–1	Southampton	Liverpool, Merseyside
	Gerrard 12'; Babbel 86'	Report	Soltvedt 20'	Stadium: Anfield; Attendance: 38,474; Referee: Dermot Gallagher

13 January 2001 22	Aston Villa	0–3	Liverpool	Birmingham
		Report	Murphy 24', 53'; Gerrard 32'	Stadium: Villa Park; Attendance: 41,366; Referee: Graham Barber

20 January 2001 23	Liverpool	0–0	Middlesbrough	Liverpool, Merseyside
		Report		Stadium: Anfield; Attendance: 43,042; Referee: Steve Dunn

31 January 2001 24	Manchester City	1–1	Liverpool	Manchester, Greater Manchester
	Tiatto 48'	Report	Heskey 43'	Stadium: Maine Road; Attendance: 34,629; Referee: Peter Jones

3 February 2001 25	Liverpool	3–0	West Ham United	Liverpool, Merseyside
	Šmicer 20'; Fowler 45', 57'	Report		Stadium: Anfield; Attendance: 44,045; Referee: Steve Bennett

10 February 2001 26	Sunderland	1–1	Liverpool	Sunderland, Wearside
	Hutchison 51'	Report	Litmanen 79' (pen.)	Stadium: Stadium of Light; Attendance: 47,553; Referee: Graham Barber

3 March 2001 27	Leicester City	2–0	Liverpool	Leicester, Leicestershire
	Akinbiyi 51'; Izzet 90'	Report		Stadium: Filbert Street; Attendance: 21,924; Referee: Dermot Gallagher

18 March 2001 28	Liverpool	1–1	Derby County	Liverpool, Merseyside
	Owen 52'	Report	Burton 9'	Stadium: Anfield; Attendance: 43,362; Referee: Neale Barry

31 March 2001 29	Liverpool	2–0	Manchester United	Liverpool, Merseyside
	Gerrard 16'; Fowler 40'	Report		Stadium: Anfield; Attendance: 44,806; Referee: Graham Poll

10 April 2001 30	Ipswich Town	1–1	Liverpool	Ipswich, Suffolk
	Armstrong 77'	Report	Heskey 46'	Stadium: Portman Road; Attendance: 23,504; Referee: Steve Dunn

13 April 2001 31	Liverpool	1–2	Leeds United	Liverpool, Merseyside
	Gerrard 55'	Report	Ferdinand 4'; Bowyer 33'	Stadium: Anfield; Attendance: 44,116; Referee: Alan Wiley

16 April 2001 32	Everton	2–3	Liverpool	Liverpool, Merseyside
	Ferguson 42'; Unsworth 83' (pen.)	Report	Heskey 5'; Babbel 57'; McAllister 90+4'	Stadium: Goodison Park; Attendance: 40,260; Referee: Jeff Winter

22 April 2001 33	Liverpool	3–1	Tottenham Hotspur	Liverpool, Merseyside
	Heskey 7'; McAllister 73' (pen.); Fowler 88'	Report	Korsten 24'	Stadium: Anfield; Attendance: 43,547; Referee: Barry Knight

28 April 2001 34	Coventry City	0–2	Liverpool	Coventry
		Report	Hyypiä 83'; McAllister 86'	Stadium: Highfield Road; Attendance: 23,063; Referee: Steve Bennett

1 May 2001 35	Bradford City	0–2	Liverpool	Bradford
		Report	Owen 47'; McAllister 67'	Stadium: Valley Parade; Attendance: 22,057; Referee: Jeff Winter

5 May 2001 36	Liverpool	3–0	Newcastle United	Liverpool, Merseyside
	Owen 25', 72', 81'	Report		Stadium: Anfield; Attendance: 44,363; Referee: Mark Halsey

8 May 2001 37	Liverpool	2–2	Chelsea	Liverpool, Merseyside
	Owen 8', 60'	Report	Hasselbaink 13', 67'	Stadium: Anfield; Attendance: 43,588; Referee: Mike Riley

19 May 2001 38	Charlton Athletic	0–4	Liverpool	London
		Report	Fowler 55', 71'; Murphy 60'; Owen 81'	Stadium: The Valley; Attendance: 20,043; Referee: Graham Barber

=== League Cup ===
==== Matches ====
1 November 2000 3	Liverpool	2–1 (a.e.t.)	Chelsea	Liverpool
	Murphy 11'; Fowler 104'	Report	Zola 29'	Stadium: Anfield; Attendance: 29,370; Referee: Rob Harris

29 November 2000 4	Stoke City	0–8	Liverpool	Stoke-on-Trent
		Report	Ziege 6'; Šmicer 26'; Babbel 28'; Fowler 39', 82', 85' (pen.); Hyypiä 59'; Murphy 65'	Stadium: Britannia Stadium; Attendance: 27,109; Referee: Andy D'Urso

13 December 2000 5	Liverpool	3–0 (a.e.t.)	Fulham	Liverpool
	Owen 105'; Šmicer 114'; Barmby 120'	Report		Stadium: Anfield; Attendance: 20,144; Referee: Dermot Gallagher

10 January 2001 Semi-final leg 1	Crystal Palace	2–1	Liverpool	Croydon, London
20:00	Rubins 56'; Morrison 77'	Report	Šmicer 78'	Stadium: Selhurst Park; Attendance: 25,933; Referee: Uriah Rennie

24 January 2001 Semi-final leg 2	Liverpool	5–0 (6-2 agg.)	Crystal Palace	Liverpool
20:00	Šmicer 13'; Murphy 15', 51'; Bišćan 18'; Fowler 89'	Report		Stadium: Anfield; Attendance: 41,854; Referee: Paul Durkin

25 February 2001 Final	Liverpool	1–1 (a.e.t.) (5–4 p)	Birmingham City	Cardiff
15:00 GMT	Fowler 30'; Hamann (yellow card) 108'; Henchoz (yellow card) 109'	Report	Purse 90' (pen.)	Stadium: Millennium Stadium; Attendance: 73,500; Referee: David Elleray (London)
	Penalties
	McAllister (penalty scored); Barmby (penalty scored); Ziege (penalty scored); Hamann (penalty missed); Fowler (penalty scored); Carragher (penalty scored)		(penalty missed) Grainger; (penalty scored) Purse; (penalty scored) Marcelo; (penalty scored) Lazaridis; (penalty scored) Hughes; (penalty missed) A. Johnson

=== FA Cup ===
==== Matches ====
6 January 2001 3	Liverpool	3–0	Rotherham United	Liverpool, Merseyside
	Heskey 47' 75'; Hamann 73'	Report		Stadium: Anfield; Attendance: 30,689; Referee: Mark Halsey

27 January 2001 4	Leeds United	0–2	Liverpool	Leeds, West Yorkshire
		Report	Barmby 88'; Heskey 90'	Stadium: Elland Road; Attendance: 37,108; Referee: Andy D'Urso

18 February 2001 5	Liverpool	4–2	Manchester City	Liverpool, Merseyside
	Litmanen 7' (pen.); Heskey 13'; Šmicer 54' (pen.); Babbel 85'	Report	Kanchelskis 29'; Goater 90'	Stadium: Anfield; Attendance: 36,231; Referee: Graham Poll

11 March 2001 6	Tranmere Rovers	2–4	Liverpool	Birkenhead, Wirral
	Steve Yates 47'; Allison 58'	Report	Murphy 12'; Owen 27'; Gerrard 52'; Fowler 82' (pen.)	Stadium: Prenton Park; Attendance: 16,342; Referee: Alan Wiley

8 April 2001 Semi-final	Wycombe Wanderers	1–2	Liverpool	Birmingham, West Midlands
16:00	Ryan 88'	Report	Heskey 78'; Fowler 83'	Stadium: Villa Park; Attendance: 40,037; Referee: Paul Durkin

12 May 2001 Final	Arsenal	1–2	Liverpool	Cardiff
15:00 BST	Ljungberg (yellow card) 62' (goal) 72'	Report	Hamann (yellow card) 57'; Owen 83', 88'	Stadium: Millennium Stadium; Attendance: 72,500; Referee: Steve Dunn

=== UEFA Cup ===
==== Matches ====
14 September 2000 1	Rapid București (Romania)	0–1	(England) Liverpool	Bucharest, Romania
		Report	Barmby 29'	Stadium: Giulești Stadium; Attendance: 9,782; Referee: (Denmark) Nicolai Volquartz

28 September 2000 1	Liverpool (England)	0–0 (1–0 agg.)	(Romania) Rapid București	Liverpool, England
		Report		Stadium: Anfield; Attendance: 37,954; Referee: (Czech Republic) Miroslav Liba

26 October 2000 2	Liverpool (England)	1–0	(Czech Republic) Slovan Liberec	Liverpool, England
	Heskey 87'	Report		Stadium: Anfield; Attendance: 29,662; Referee: (Switzerland) Massimo Busacca

9 November 2000 2	Slovan Liberec (Czech Republic)	2–3 (2–4 agg.)	(England) Liverpool	Liberec, Czech Republic
	Štajner 9'; Breda 89'	Report	Barmby 31'; Heskey 76'; Owen 82'	Stadium: Stadion u Nisy; Attendance: 6,808; Referee: (Germany) Edgar Steinborn

23 November 2000 3	Olympiacos (Greece)	2–2	(England) Liverpool	Athens, Greece
	Alexandris 65', 92'	Report	Barmby 38'; Gerrard 67'	Stadium: Olympic Stadium; Attendance: 43,855; Referee: (Netherlands) René Temmink

7 December 2000 3	Liverpool (England)	2–0 (4–2 agg.)	(Greece) Olympiacos	Liverpool, England
	Heskey 28'; Barmby 60'	Report		Stadium: Anfield; Attendance: 35,484; Referee: (Portugal) Vítor Melo Pereira

15 February 2001 4	Roma (Italy)	0–2	(England) Liverpool	Rome, Italy
		Report	Owen 46', 72'	Stadium: Stadio Olimpico; Attendance: 59,718; Referee: (Germany) Markus Merk

22 February 2001 4	Liverpool (England)	0–1 (2–1 agg.)	(Italy) Roma	Liverpool, England
		Report	Guigou 70'	Stadium: Anfield; Attendance: 43,688; Referee: (Spain) José María García-Aranda

8 March 2001 QF	Porto (Portugal)	0–0	(England) Liverpool	Porto, Portugal
		Report		Stadium: Estádio das Antas; Attendance: 21,502; Referee: (Italy) Pierluigi Collina

15 March 2001 QF	Liverpool (England)	2–0 (2–0 agg.)	(Portugal) Porto	Liverpool, England
	Murphy 33'; Owen 37'	Report		Stadium: Anfield; Attendance: 40,502; Referee: (Denmark) Kim Milton Nielsen

5 April 2001 SF	Barcelona (Spain)	0–0	(England) Liverpool	Barcelona, Spain
	Zenden (yellow card) 88'	Report	Fowler (yellow card) 86'	Stadium: Camp Nou; Attendance: 90,832; Referee: (Germany) Hellmut Krug

19 April 2001 SF	Liverpool (England)	1–0 (1–0 agg.)	(Spain) Barcelona	Liverpool, England
	McAllister 44' (pen.); Westerveld (yellow card) 85'	Report	Sabrosa (yellow card) 62'	Stadium: Anfield; Attendance: 44,203; Referee: (Switzerland) Urs Meier

16 May 2001 F	Liverpool (England)	5–4 (a.e.t.)	(Spain) Alavés	Dortmund, Germany
20:45	Babbel 3' (yellow card) 106'; McAllister (yellow card) 11' (goal) 40' (pen.); Gerrard 16'; Fowler 72'; Geli 116' (o.g.)	Report	Astudillo (yellow card) 11'; Alonso 26'; Herrera (yellow card) 40'; Moreno 47', 59'; Contra (yellow card) 49'; Karmona (yellow card) 58' (yellow-red card) 116'; Magno (yellow card) 82' (yellow-red card) 98'; Cruyff 88'; Téllez (yellow card) 95'	Stadium: Westfalen; Attendance: 48,050; Referee: (France) Gilles Veissière

== Statistics ==
=== Player statistics ===
As of 31 June 2001

No.	Pos	Nat	Player	Total		FA Premier League		FA Cup		League Cup		UEFA Cup	
No.	Pos	Nat	Player	Apps	Goals	Apps	Goals	Apps	Goals	Apps	Goals	Apps	Goals
1	GK	(Netherlands) NED	Sander Westerveld	61	0	38	0	6	0	4	0	13	0
2	DF	(Switzerland) SUI	Stéphane Henchoz	53	0	32	0	5	0	6	0	10	0
3	DF	(Germany) GER	Christian Ziege	32	2	11+5	1	2+1	0	1+3	1	6+3	0
4	DF	(Cameroon) CMR	Rigobert Song	4	0	3	0	0	0	0	0	1	0
5	DF	(Republic of Ireland) IRL	Steve Staunton	2	0	0+1	0	0	0	0	0	0+1	0
6	DF	(Germany) GER	Markus Babbel	60	6	38	3	5	1	4	1	13	1
7	MF	(Czech Republic) CZE	Vladimír Šmicer	49	7	16+11	2	4+1	1	5+1	4	6+5	0
8	FW	(England) ENG	Emile Heskey	56	22	33+3	14	3+2	5	3+1	0	9+2	3
9	FW	(England) ENG	Robbie Fowler	48	17	15+12	8	3+2	2	5	6	6+5	1
10	FW	(England) ENG	Michael Owen	46	24	20+8	16	4+1	3	1+1	1	10+1	4
12	DF	(Finland) FIN	Sami Hyypiä	58	4	35	3	6	0	6	1	11	0
13	MF	(England) ENG	Danny Murphy	47	10	13+14	4	4+1	1	5	4	6+4	1
14	DF	(Norway) NOR	Vegard Heggem	4	0	1+2	0	0	0	0	0	1	0
15	MF	(Czech Republic) CZE	Patrik Berger	21	2	11+3	2	0+1	0	1	0	3+2	0
16	MF	(Germany) GER	Dietmar Hamann	53	3	26+4	2	5	1	2+3	0	13	0
17	MF	(England) ENG	Steven Gerrard	50	10	29+4	7	2+2	1	4	0	9	2
18	FW	(Netherlands) NED	Erik Meijer	3	0	0+3	0	0	0	0	0	0	0
19	GK	(France) FRA	Pegguy Arphexad	2	0	0	0	0	0	2	0	0	0
20	MF	(England) ENG	Nick Barmby	46	8	21+5	2	2+3	1	2+4	1	6+3	4
21	MF	(Scotland) SCO	Gary McAllister	49	8	21+9	5	4+1	1	2+3	0	4+5	2
23	DF	(England) ENG	Jamie Carragher	58	0	30+4	0	6	0	6	0	12	0
24	MF	(France) FRA	Bernard Diomède	4	0	1+1	0	0	0	0	0	2	0
25	MF	(Croatia) CRO	Igor Bišćan	21	2	8+5	0	3+1	1	4	1	0	0
26	MF	(Republic of Ireland) IRL	Richie Partridge	1	0	0	0	0	0	1	0	0	0
27	DF	(France) FRA	Grégory Vignal	7	0	4+2	0	0+1	0	0	0	0	0
29	DF	(England) ENG	Stephen Wright	4	0	0+2	0	1	0	0+1	0	0	0
30	DF	(France) FRA	Djimi Traoré	12	0	8	0	0	0	1	0	2+1	0
37	MF	(Finland) FIN	Jari Litmanen	9	2	4+1	1	1+1	1	1+1	0	0	0

=== Goalscorers ===
Includes all competitive matches.

Rank	Pos.	No.	Player	FA Premier League	FA Cup	League Cup	UEFA Cup	Total
1	FW	10	(England) Michael Owen	16	3	1	4	24
2	FW	8	(England) Emile Heskey	14	5	0	3	22
3	FW	9	(England) Robbie Fowler	8	2	6	1	17
4	MF	17	(England) Steven Gerrard	7	1	0	2	10
4	MF	13	(England) Danny Murphy	4	1	4	1	10
6	MF	20	(England) Nick Barmby	2	1	1	4	8
7	MF	21	(Scotland) Gary McAllister	5	0	0	2	7
7	MF	7	(Czech Republic) Vladimír Šmicer	2	1	4	0	7
9	DF	6	(England) Markus Babbel	3	1	1	1	6
10	DF	12	(Finland) Sami Hyypiä	3	0	1	0	4
11	MF	16	(Germany) Dietmar Hamann	2	1	0	0	3
12	MF	15	(Czech Republic) Patrik Berger	2	0	0	0	2
12	MF	37	(Finland) Jari Litmanen	1	1	0	0	2
12	DF	3	(Germany) Christian Ziege	1	0	1	0	2
15	DF	25	(Croatia) Igor Bišćan	0	0	1	0	1
Own goal				1	0	0	1	2
TOTALS				71	17	17	20	127

=== Competition top scorers ===
Competition	Result	Top scorer
FA Premier League	3rd	(England) Michael Owen, 16
UEFA Cup	Winners	(England) Nick Barmby, 4 (England) Michael Owen, 4
FA Cup	Winners	(England) Emile Heskey, 5
League Cup	Winners	(England) Robbie Fowler, 6
Overall		(England) Michael Owen, 24
