= Skuhravý =

Skuhravý, female Skuhravá, is a Czech surname. Notable people with the surname include:

- Roman Skuhravý (born 1975), Czech football manager and player
- Tomáš Skuhravý (born 1965), Czech footballer
