= Steven Gerrard =

English football manager (born 1980)

Steven Gerrard MBE
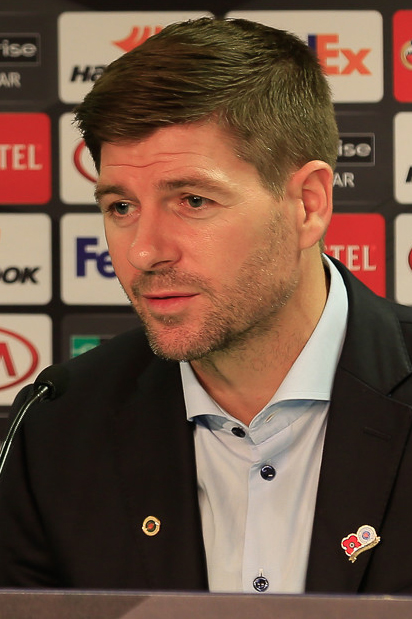
- Gerrard as Rangers manager in 2018

Personal information
- Full name: Steven George Gerrard
- Date of birth: 30 May 1980 (age 46)
- Place of birth: Whiston, Merseyside, England
- Height: 6 ft 1 in (1.85 m)
- Position: Midfielder

Youth career
- 1989–1998: Liverpool

Senior career*
Years	Team	Apps	(Gls)
1998–2015	Liverpool	504	(120)
2015–2016	LA Galaxy	34	(5)
Total		538	(125)

International career
1999–2000	England U21	4	(1)
2000–2014	England	114	(21)

Managerial career
- 2017–2018: Liverpool U18/U19
- 2018–2021: Rangers
- 2021–2022: Aston Villa
- 2023–2025: Al-Ettifaq
- * Club domestic league appearances and goals

Steven George Gerrard (born 30 May 1980) is an English professional football manager and a former player who most recently managed Saudi Pro League club Al Ettifaq. Widely regarded as one of the greatest midfielders of all time and one of Liverpool's greatest ever players, Gerrard spent the majority of his playing career as a central midfielder for Liverpool and the England national team, captaining both.

Born in Merseyside, Gerrard played for his local club Liverpool for most of his professional career, from 1998 to 2015; here he won nine trophies, including one UEFA Champions League (2005), two FA Cups, and three League Cups. He was Man of the Match in the 2005 UEFA Champions League final, in which Liverpool overturned a 3–0 deficit to defeat AC Milan on penalties, and the 2006 FA Cup final, which has been termed The Gerrard Final in homage to his performance. Despite success in cup competitions, he never won the Premier League. Gerrard won 114 England caps between 2000 and 2014, captaining the team 38 times and scoring 21 goals. He played at three UEFA European Championships, in 2000, 2004, and 2012 (where he was named in the Team of the Tournament) and three FIFA World Cups, in 2006, 2010, and 2014. He spent two years at Major League Soccer club LA Galaxy and retired in 2016.

Gerrard began his managerial career managing the Liverpool Youth Academy's under-18 team, before starting his senior managerial career in 2018 with Scottish Premiership club Rangers. In his third full season in charge, Gerrard's side went unbeaten in the league to win Rangers' first league title in ten years. In November 2021, he was appointed manager of Aston Villa, but he was dismissed after eleven months in charge. From July 2023 to January 2025, Gerrard managed Al-Ettifaq in Saudi Arabia.

As a player, his individual awards include UEFA Club Footballer of the Year in 2005, PFA Players' Player of the Year in 2006, FWA Footballer of the Year in 2009, appointment as a Member of the Order of the British Empire in 2007, and induction into the Premier League Hall of Fame in 2021. He was also named in the PFA Premier League Team of the Year a record eight times, more than any other footballer in Premier League history. As a manager, he was named as Manager of the Year for 2021 by PFA Scotland and the SFWA, due to his title success with Rangers.

== Early life ==
Steven George Gerrard was born on 30 May 1980 at Whiston Hospital in Whiston, Merseyside, the second son of Julie Ann and Paul Gerrard. He started out playing for his hometown team, Whiston Juniors, where he was noticed by Liverpool scouts; he joined the Liverpool Academy in 1989, aged nine. Liverpool was the club that he adored while growing up as a youngster, and his childhood football heroes were Liverpool's John Barnes, Ian Rush and England's Paul Gascoigne. As a child, he had an accident in which a garden fork pierced the big toe of his right foot. In his autobiography, he credited his father and Liverpool Academy director Steve Heighway for preventing unnecessary surgery to amputate his toe.

Despite not being a Catholic and living outside the school's catchment area, Gerrard attended Cardinal Heenan Catholic High School in Liverpool's West Derby suburb after it was recommended by his primary school teacher (whose husband was a PE teacher there) due to its superior football reputation over other schools in the area. He had trials with various clubs at age 14, but his success was not immediate and he never made it into the England schoolboys' team. His trials included one with Manchester United, which he admitted in his autobiography was solely "to pressure Liverpool into giving [him] a Youth Training Scheme contract". He signed his first professional contract with Liverpool on 5 November 1997.

== Club career ==
=== Liverpool ===
==== 1998–2004: Beginnings, cup treble and club captaincy ====
Gerrard made his first-team debut for Liverpool on 29 November 1998 as a late substitute in a Premier League match against Blackburn Rovers. He made thirteen appearances in his debut season, replacing injured captain Jamie Redknapp in central midfield. He also occasionally played on the right wing, but scarcely contributed in the short match time he received, which he attributed to nerves. Gerrard recalled in a 2008 interview with The Guardian, "I was out of position and out of my depth." Nonetheless, Liverpool's coaching staff remained convinced that he would improve. Gerrard saw himself as a defensive player primarily, looking to make key tackles rather than push the team forward.

Replacing Paul Ince, Gerrard regularly partnered Redknapp in midfield for the 1999–2000 season. After starting the Merseyside derby on the bench, he replaced Robbie Fowler in the second half, receiving his first career red card for a challenge to the upper leg of Everton's Kevin Campbell. On 5 December 1999, Gerrard scored his first senior goal in a 4–1 home victory over Sheffield Wednesday. However, he began to suffer from persistent back problems, which sports consultant Hans-Wilhelm Müller-Wohlfahrt later diagnosed as a result of accelerated growth, coupled with excessive playing, during his teenage years. He was then beset by groin injuries that required four separate operations.

"Strong, quick, technically superb, a creative passer, a fine finisher, long-range shooter, fierce tackler and a ferocious competitor – these attributes grew, too, with each season."

— Liverpool F.C. profile on Gerrard ranking him their greatest ever player, on his development in his early seasons at the club.

In the 2000–01 season, Gerrard made fifty starts in all competitions, scoring ten goals. That season, he won his first major honours with Liverpool—the FA Cup, Football League Cup, and the UEFA Cup—scoring in the final of the last competition. He was named PFA Young Player of the Year by his peers. The following season, he won the UEFA Super Cup, but missed the 2001 FA Charity Shield through injury. In March 2003, Gerrard scored the opening goal in the club's 2–0 win over Manchester United in the Football League Cup final, held at the Millennium Stadium in Cardiff. After a year as vice-captain, Gerrard replaced Sami Hyypiä as Liverpool captain in October 2003. Manager Gérard Houllier said that he had recognised Gerrard's leadership qualities early on, but that he needed time to mature.

In June 2005, Gerrard extended his contract at the club, signing a four-year deal. Houllier resigned as Liverpool manager after a trophy-less 2003–04 campaign, and Gerrard was linked with a move to Chelsea during the off-season. Gerrard admitted that he was not "happy with the progress Liverpool has made", and that "for the first time in my career I've thought about the possibility of moving on." Ultimately, Gerrard turned down a £20 million offer from Chelsea, staying with Liverpool under new coach Rafael Benítez.

==== 2004–2007: Champions League and FA Cup success ====
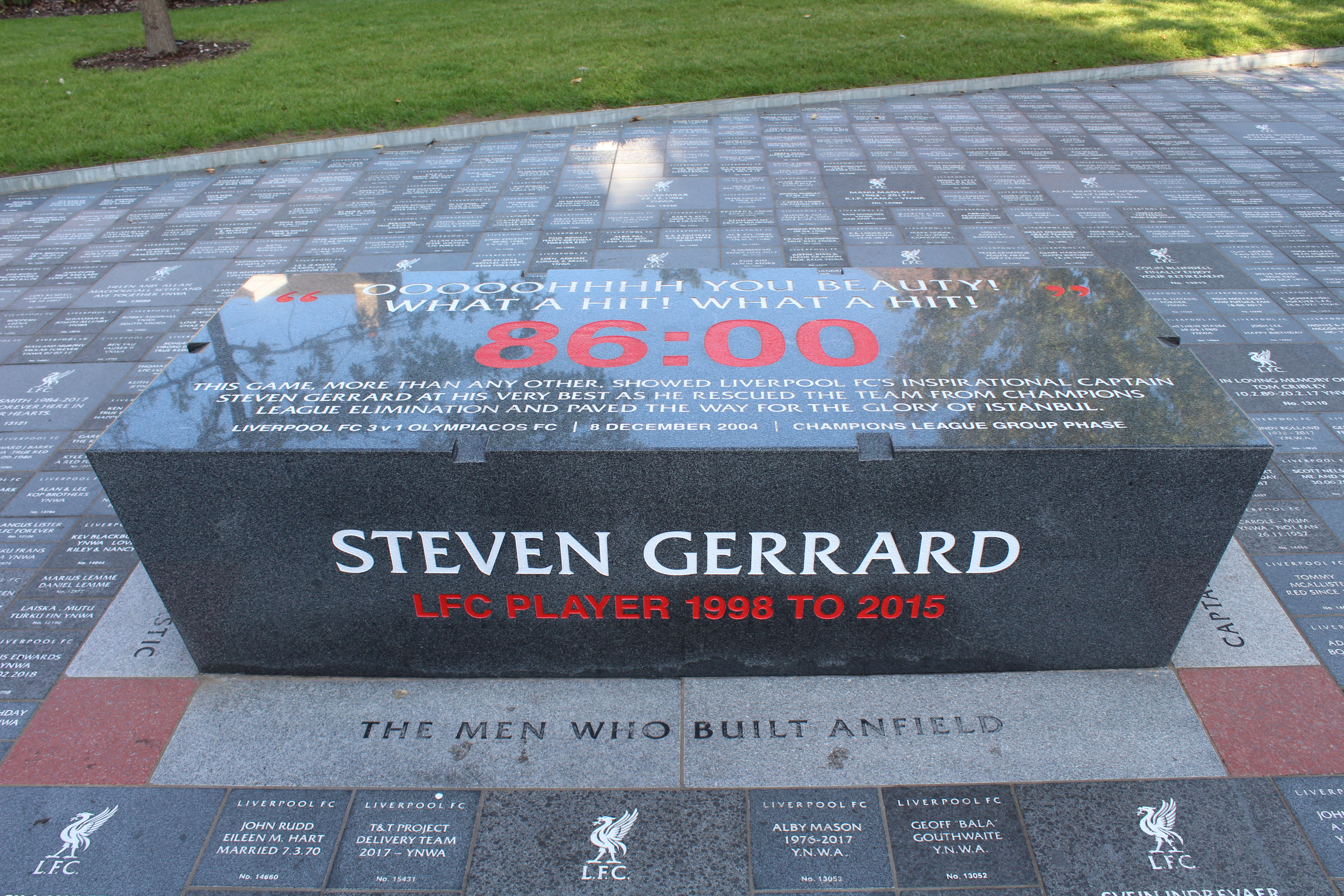
The Gerrard plinth outside Anfield inscribed with 86 minutes (the time of his strike against Olympiacos) and "Oooohhhh you beauty! What a hit! What a hit!"

Liverpool had many injuries early in the 2004–05 season, and a broken toe suffered in a September league match against Manchester United sidelined Gerrard until late November. On 8 December, Gerrard scored a crucial 25-yard half volley in the 86th minute of Liverpool's final Champions League group stage match against Olympiacos to send the club through to the knockout round. A strike that saw Sky Sports co-commentator Andy Gray exclaim, "Oh, you beauty!! What a hit son! What a hit!", Gerrard claimed that this was his most important, if not his best, goal for Liverpool to date. However, Gerrard netted an own goal during the 2005 League Cup final on 27 February, which proved decisive in Liverpool's 3–2 loss to Chelsea after extra time at the Millennium Stadium.

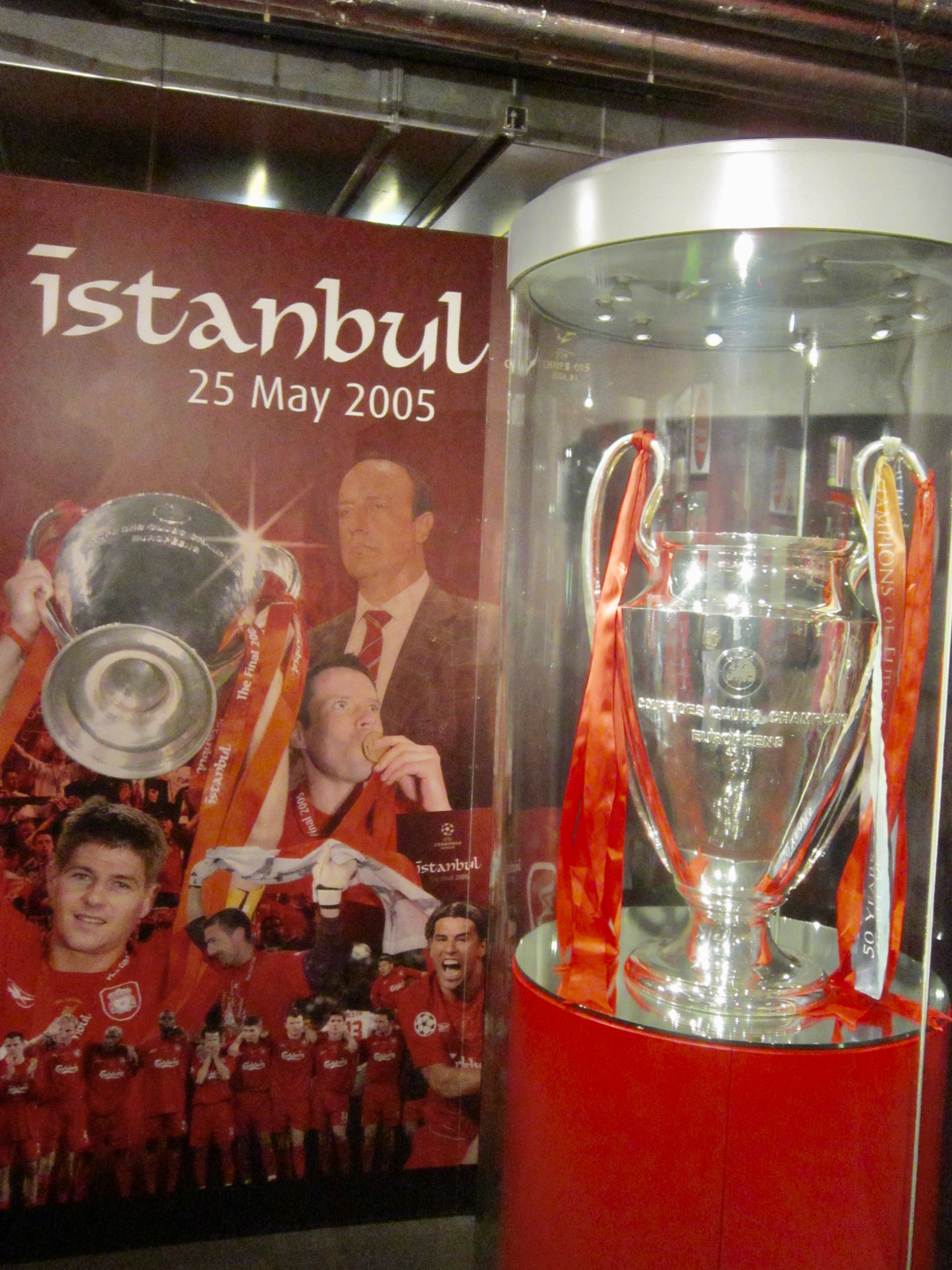
Image of Gerrard lifting the Champions League trophy next to the actual trophy in the Liverpool F.C. museum

During a six-minute stretch in the second half of the 2005 Champions League final against AC Milan, Liverpool came back from a three-goal deficit to tie the match at 3–3 after extra time; Gerrard scored the first for his side, a header from a John Arne Riise cross. Liverpool's third goal was gained as a penalty from a foul awarded to Liverpool when Gennaro Gattuso was judged to have pulled down Gerrard in Milan's penalty area. Xabi Alonso's penalty was saved by Dida but the rebound was scored. Gerrard did not participate in the penalty shoot-out (he was the designated fifth penalty taker) which Liverpool won 3–2 as they claimed their first Champions League trophy in twenty years. Dubbed the Miracle of Istanbul, the match is widely regarded as one of the greatest finals in the competition's history, and Gerrard was lauded as the catalyst for the second half comeback. Gerrard was named the Man of the Match, and later received the UEFA Club Footballer of the Year award.

In regards to his contract issues with Liverpool, Gerrard told the press after the final, "How can I leave after a night like this?" but negotiations soon stalled and on 5 July 2005, after Liverpool turned down another lucrative offer from Chelsea, Gerrard's agent Struan Marshall informed Liverpool chief executive Rick Parry that Gerrard was rejecting a club-record £100,000-a-week offer. Parry conceded the club had lost Gerrard, saying, "Now we have to move on. We have done our best, but he has made it clear he wants to go and I think it looks pretty final." The next day, Gerrard signed a new four-year deal as Parry blamed the earlier breakdown of talks on miscommunication between the two sides. Gerrard stated upon signing the contract that he would rather win one Premier League title with Liverpool than win multiple titles at Chelsea as it would mean more to him.

"Gerrard is for me, in the position he plays, one of the very best in the world. He has a huge impact. For the job he performs, for me, he is one of the greatest."

— Ronaldinho speaking in 2007 with both players named in the FIFA World XI.

Gerrard scored 23 goals in 53 appearances in 2005–06, and in April became the first Liverpool player since John Barnes in 1988 to be voted the PFA Players' Player of the Year. He scored twice in the 2006 FA Cup final against West Ham United, including an injury time 35-yard equaliser that sent the match into extra time, and Liverpool won their second consecutive major trophy on penalties. A match called The Gerrard Final, the goals made him the only player to have scored in the FA Cup, League Cup, UEFA Cup and UEFA Champions League finals. Liverpool eliminated Chelsea in the 2006–07 Champions League semi-finals on penalties, to return to their second final in three seasons, which they lost 2–1 to Milan in Athens.

During this period, Gerrard credited assistant manager Pako Ayestarán as an essential figure in the team's success under Benítez. He described him as "the perfect number two", highlighting his elite training standards, uplifting presence in the dressing room, and ability to communicate honestly with players. Gerrard said he always felt "fresh and fired-up" under Ayestarán's guidance. After Ayestarán's departure in 2007, Gerrard wrote that Liverpool lost a crucial stabilising presence, and that communication between players and manager began to suffer.

==== 2007–2012: Continued success and stardom ====
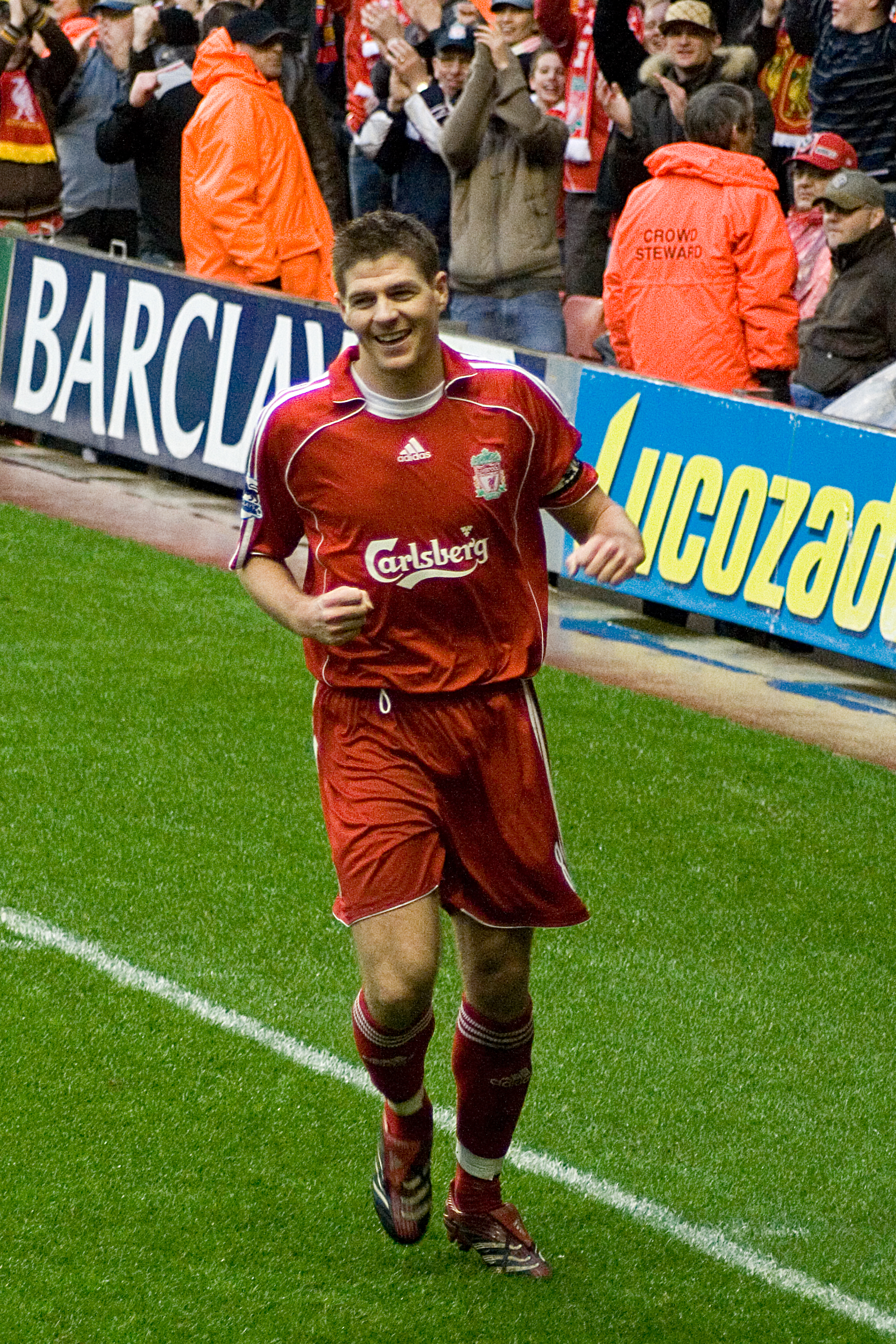
Gerrard playing for Liverpool in the Premier League in 2007

Gerrard suffered a toe fracture in an August 2007 Champions League qualifier against Toulouse, but returned four days later to play the entirety of a 1–1 league draw against Chelsea. On 28 October 2007 he played his 400th game for Liverpool in a league match against Arsenal, in which he scored. He scored in all but one of Liverpool's domestic and European matches during the month of November, and after scoring the only goal in a Champions League away tie against Marseille on 11 December, he became the first Liverpool player since John Aldridge in 1989 to score in seven consecutive games in all competitions. In December 2007, Gerrard was voted sixth (after Kaká, Lionel Messi, Cristiano Ronaldo, Didier Drogba and Ronaldinho) for the 2007 FIFA World Player of the Year.

Gerrard made his 300th Premier League appearance on 13 April 2008 in a match against Blackburn Rovers, scoring the opening goal in a game which Liverpool won 3–1, and finished the season with twenty-one goals in all competitions, surpassing his total from the 2006–07 season. Gerrard was selected for the PFA Team of the Year and he was also one of the nominees or the PFA Players' Player of the Year, alongside teammate Fernando Torres.

Gerrard needed to undergo groin surgery at the beginning of the 2008–09 season, but the problem was not serious and he quickly returned to training. He scored what appeared to be his hundredth career Liverpool goal against Stoke City on 20 September, but it was disallowed after Dirk Kuyt was ruled offside. He achieved the milestone eleven days later in a 3–1 Champions League group stage win over PSV.

"Is he the best in the world? He might not get the attention of Messi and Ronaldo but yes, I think he just might be. He has great passing ability, can tackle and scores goals, but most importantly he gives the players around him confidence and belief. You can't learn that – players like him are just born with that presence."

— Zinedine Zidane on Gerrard, 2009.

He made his 100th appearance in European club competition for Liverpool on 10 March 2009 against Real Madrid and scored twice in a 4–0 win. Four days later, when Liverpool faced Manchester United, Gerrard won a penalty after he had been fouled by Patrice Evra. With the scoreline at 1–1, Gerrard scored the resulting spot-kick, his first goal at Old Trafford, to give Liverpool the lead en route to a 4–1 victory. Following these results, three-time FIFA World Player of the Year Zinedine Zidane hailed Gerrard as possibly the best player in the world. On 22 March 2009, Gerrard scored his first ever hat-trick in the Premier League, against Aston Villa, in a 5–0 victory.

On 13 May 2009, Gerrard was named as the 2009 Football Writers' Association Footballer of the Year, beating Ryan Giggs by just 10 votes and becoming the first Liverpool player to win the award in nineteen years. Gerrard was delighted and "a little bit surprised" to win the award. On 5 December 2009, Gerrard made his 500th appearance for Liverpool at Blackburn. He ended the 2009–10 season with 12 goals and nine assists from 46 matches.

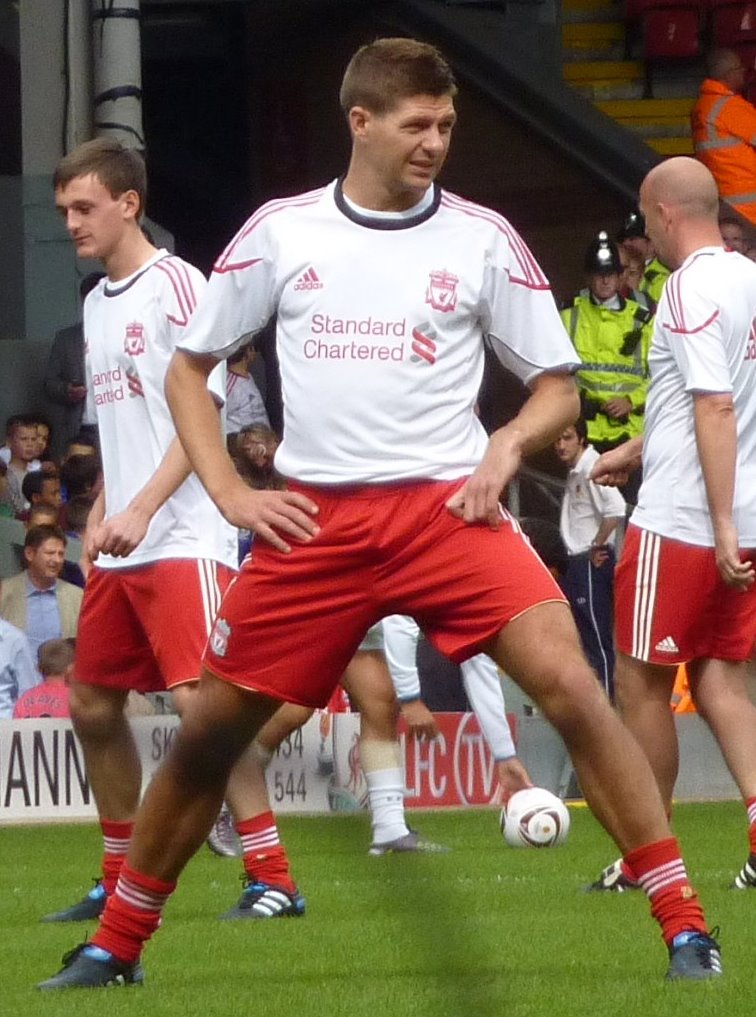
Gerrard before Jamie Carragher's testimonial in 2010

Following the 2009–10 season, Rafael Benítez departed Liverpool after six years and was succeeded as manager by Roy Hodgson, who quickly assured fans that Gerrard would not be sold. To further eliminate any speculation surrounding his future at the club, Gerrard made a statement emphasising his excitement at the coming season with Liverpool and praising the signing of Joe Cole. Gerrard soon played his first pre-season match of the 2010–11 season against Borussia Mönchengladbach on 1 August 2010 alongside new signing Joe Cole.

Gerrard scored his first goal of the 2010–11 season from the penalty spot in a Europa League qualifier against Macedonian side FK Rabotnički on 5 August 2010. His next two goals came on 19 September at Old Trafford in a 3–2 loss against Manchester United; he scored from a penalty kick in the 64th minute and a free-kick six minutes later to level the game at 2–2. He followed this up one week later with the second equaliser in a 2–2 home draw with Sunderland. Eleven days later, Gerrard came off the bench to score a second-half hat-trick in a 3–1 win over Napoli in the Europa League.

Gerrard missed the start of the 2011–12 season due to a groin injury, which had also kept him out of action for large parts of the previous season. Gerrard later went on to reveal he rejected the chance to join Bayern Munich in the summer to focus on getting Liverpool back in the Champions League, saying "... a traditional club like Liverpool still has a value, that's the reason why I have stuck around for so long ... it is more important to win a couple of trophies and achieve something that is a lot more difficult than go down the easy road and move to a club where it becomes easier."

"Steven Gerrard would be the captain of my World XI dream team. Gerrard is a complete player because he can play in every position and can do everything with a football at any time in a game. He's a player who scores goals, who builds the play, he's a sensational player."

— AS Roma legend, Francesco Totti on Gerrard.

On 29 October, Gerrard underwent treatment to clear an infection in his right ankle, which was placed in a protective plaster cast. He was forced to miss Liverpool's league match against West Bromwich Albion that day and was ruled out for at least the match against Swansea City the following week and England's friendly matches against Sweden and Spain the week after that. On 30 December, Gerrard came off the bench against Newcastle United and scored a fine goal.

Gerrard went on to help Liverpool to reach their first cup final in 6 years, and their first at Wembley Stadium in 18 years, as Liverpool beat Manchester City 3–2 on aggregate in the semi-finals. Gerrard scored a penalty in both legs to send Liverpool to the 2012 Football League Cup final against Cardiff City on 26 February 2012, which Liverpool won on penalties. On his 400th Premier League appearance for Liverpool, Gerrard scored a hat-trick to give Liverpool a 3–0 victory over rivals Everton in the Merseyside derby on 13 March.

==== 2012–2015: Final seasons with Liverpool ====
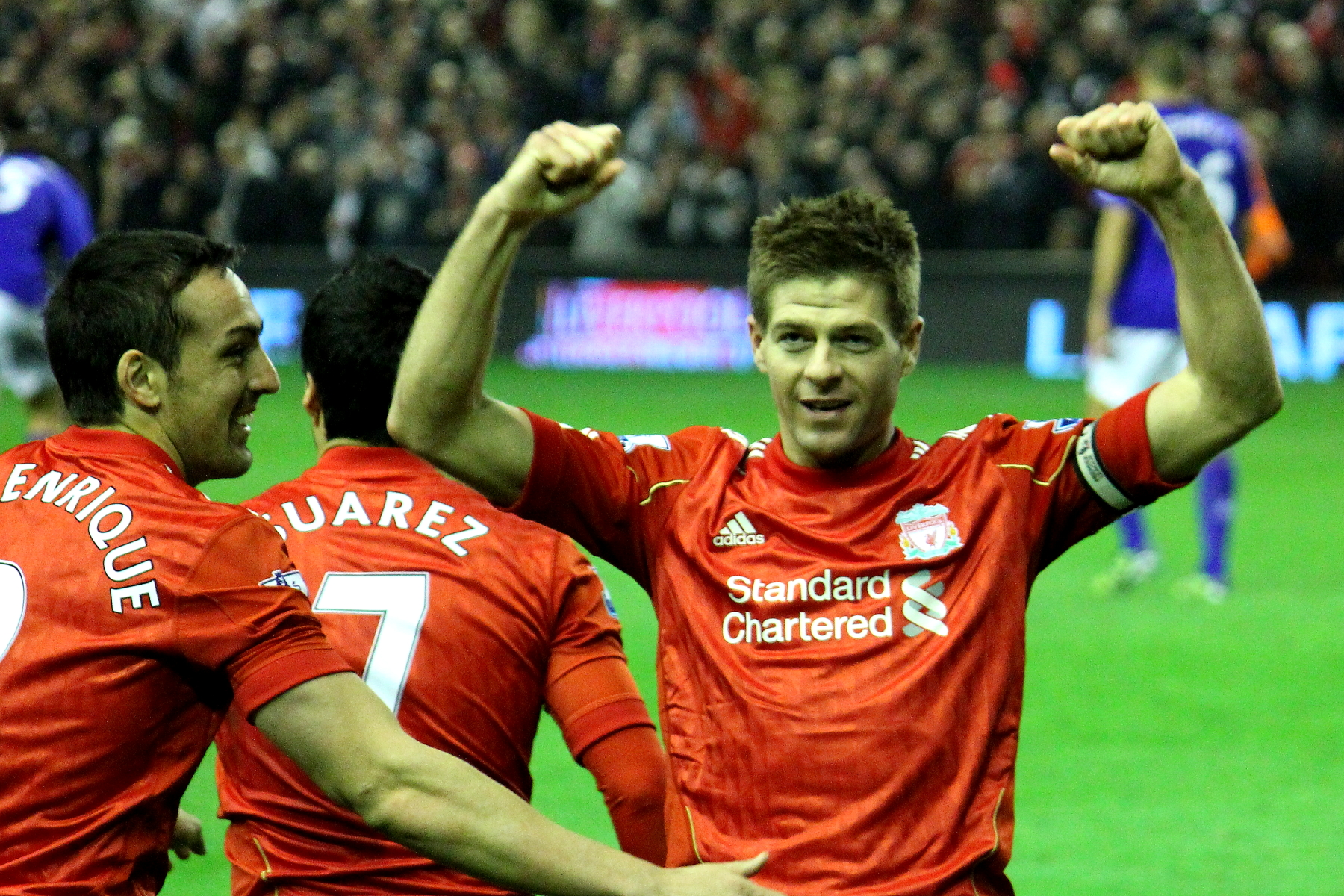
Gerrard celebrates after scoring a hat-trick in the Merseyside derby in 2012

On 18 August 2012, Gerrard played his 250th match as Liverpool captain. He scored his first Premier League goal of the season on 23 September, opening the scoring in a 2–1 defeat against Manchester United.

On 15 July 2013, Gerrard signed a contract extension with Liverpool. On 3 August 2013, Liverpool played Olympiacos, against whom Gerrard scored arguably his most celebrated goal, at Anfield for Gerrard's charity fund-raising testimonial match. Liverpool won the match 2–0, in a game where past players such as Jamie Carragher and Robbie Fowler made appearances. Alder Hey Children's Charity, of which Gerrard is a founding partner, received £500,000 from the proceeds. On 5 October, Gerrard scored in a 3–1 win over Crystal Palace, becoming Liverpool's first ever player to score in 15 successive league campaigns, overtaking the record previously set by Billy Liddell in 1959. Also in October 2013, he became the longest-serving Liverpool captain, 10 years after his appointment by Gérard Houllier on 15 October 2013, breaking the previous record held by Alex Raisbeck, who captained Liverpool from 1899 to 1909.

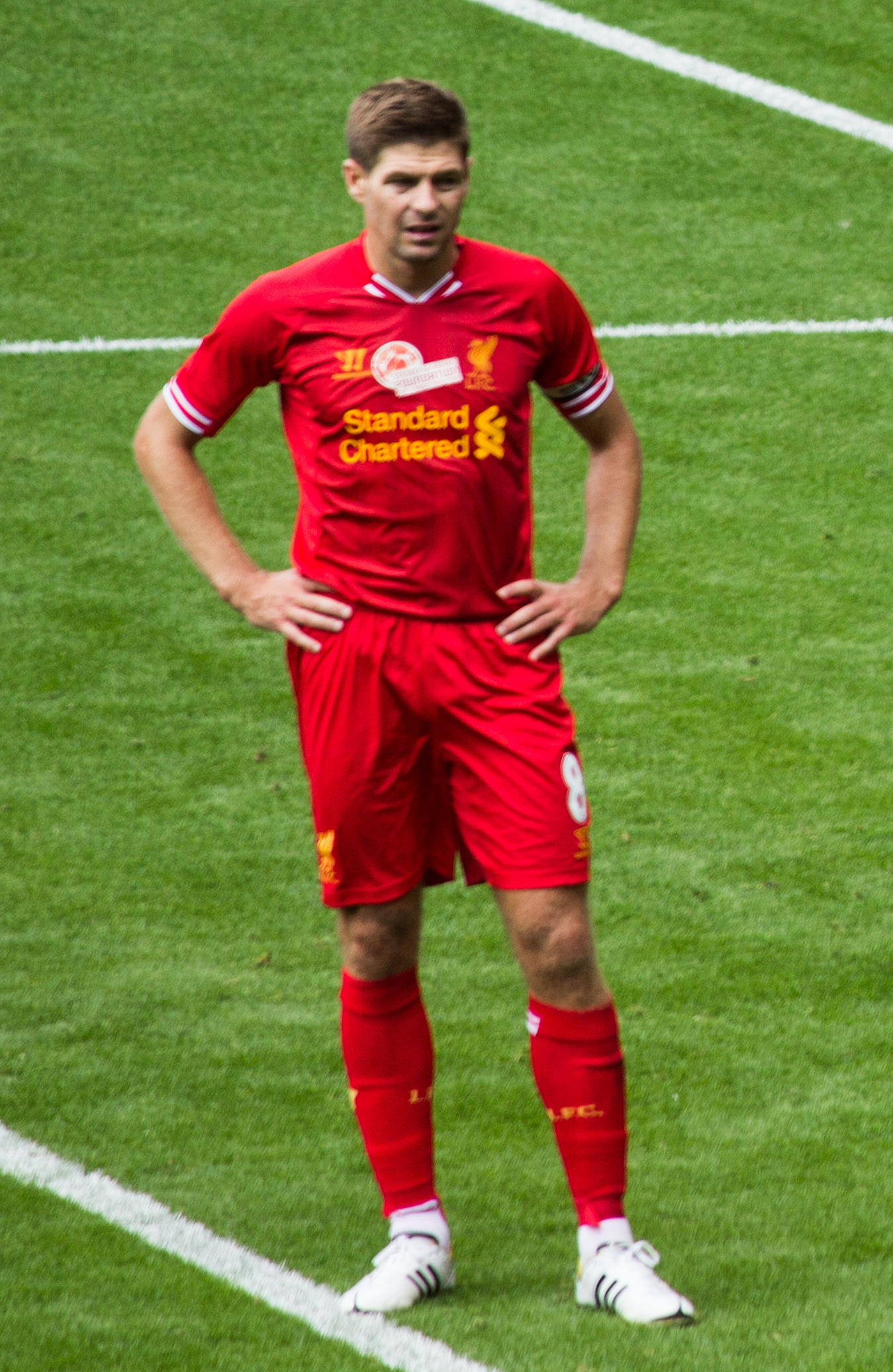
Gerrard during his testimonial in August 2013

On 19 October 2013, Gerrard scored his 100th Premier League goal, a penalty against Newcastle United in a 2–2 draw. On 16 March 2014, Gerrard scored two penalties and missed another in Liverpool's 3–0 win over Manchester United at Old Trafford. With nine career goals against arch rivals Manchester United he was Liverpool's highest goalscorer in the fixture (a record since surpassed by Mohamed Salah). On 6 April, he scored another two penalties as Liverpool beat West Ham United 2–1 to go top of the Premier League table with five matches to play. These goals took him above Kenny Dalglish as Liverpool's sixth-top goalscorer of all time.

On 27 April 2014, Gerrard was involved in what was later labelled as a defining moment of the 2013–14 Premier League season; where Liverpool would ultimately finish second. Liverpool originally topped the league when they faced Chelsea in their third last match of the season. Gerrard slipped while receiving a pass from Mamadou Sakho which allowed Demba Ba to score the opening goal for Chelsea; Chelsea went on to win 2–0, which meant that Liverpool's title hopes were no longer in their own hands. Gerrard finished the season with 13 goals and the League's most assists at 13. Gerrard was a nominee for the PFA Players' Player of the Year award that year, while he won the 2014 Liverpool Echo Sports Personality Award. Gerrard would later refer to this period as "the worst three months of my life".

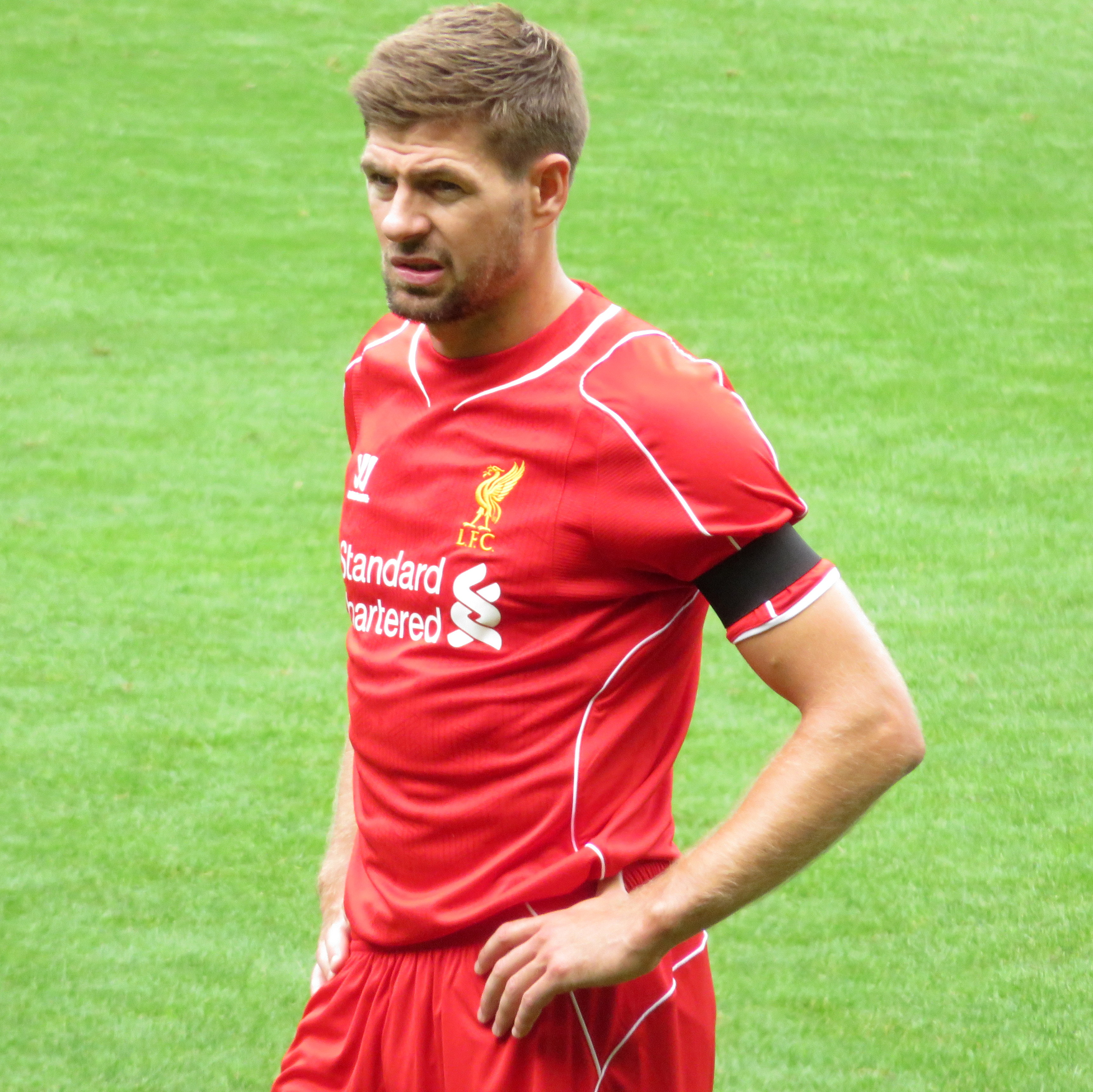
Gerrard in August 2014. The 2014–15 season was his last for Liverpool.

In October 2014, Gerrard ruled out retiring at the end of the 2014–15 season and said that he could join another club if he were not offered a new contract at Liverpool. On 1 January 2015, Gerrard announced that he would leave Liverpool at the end of the season. Gerrard said he would have signed a new contract had it been offered in the offseason, but said the club did not make an offer until November. By that time, Brendan Rodgers had spoken to him about managing his playing time and he had been left out of the starting line-up against Real Madrid in the Champions League, contributing to his decision to leave Liverpool. His goal against Basel in the final group stage game of the Champions League was Gerrard's 30th goal in the competition, a club record until it was surpassed by Mohamed Salah in 2021. On 5 January 2015, Gerrard scored two goals in his first game after announcing his departure in the FA Cup 3rd round tie in a 2–1 win at AFC Wimbledon. This followed another two-goal performance in the previous match against Leicester, the first time he scored two or more goals in consecutive games since July 2005. On 4 February 2015, he made his 700th appearance for Liverpool, in an FA Cup tie against Bolton.

On 22 March, Gerrard was sent off 38 seconds after coming on as a half-time substitute in a match against Manchester United for stamping on Ander Herrera. Gerrard made his 500th league appearance for Liverpool in a goalless draw against West Brom on 25 April; he became only the third player ever to achieve 500 or more Premier League appearances for one club, after Ryan Giggs and former teammate Jamie Carragher. His final appearance for Liverpool at Anfield was on 16 May against Crystal Palace in a 3–1 loss. His final appearance for the club was eight days later in a 6–1 defeat at Stoke, with Gerrard scoring Liverpool's only goal of the game.

=== LA Galaxy: Final years and retirement ===
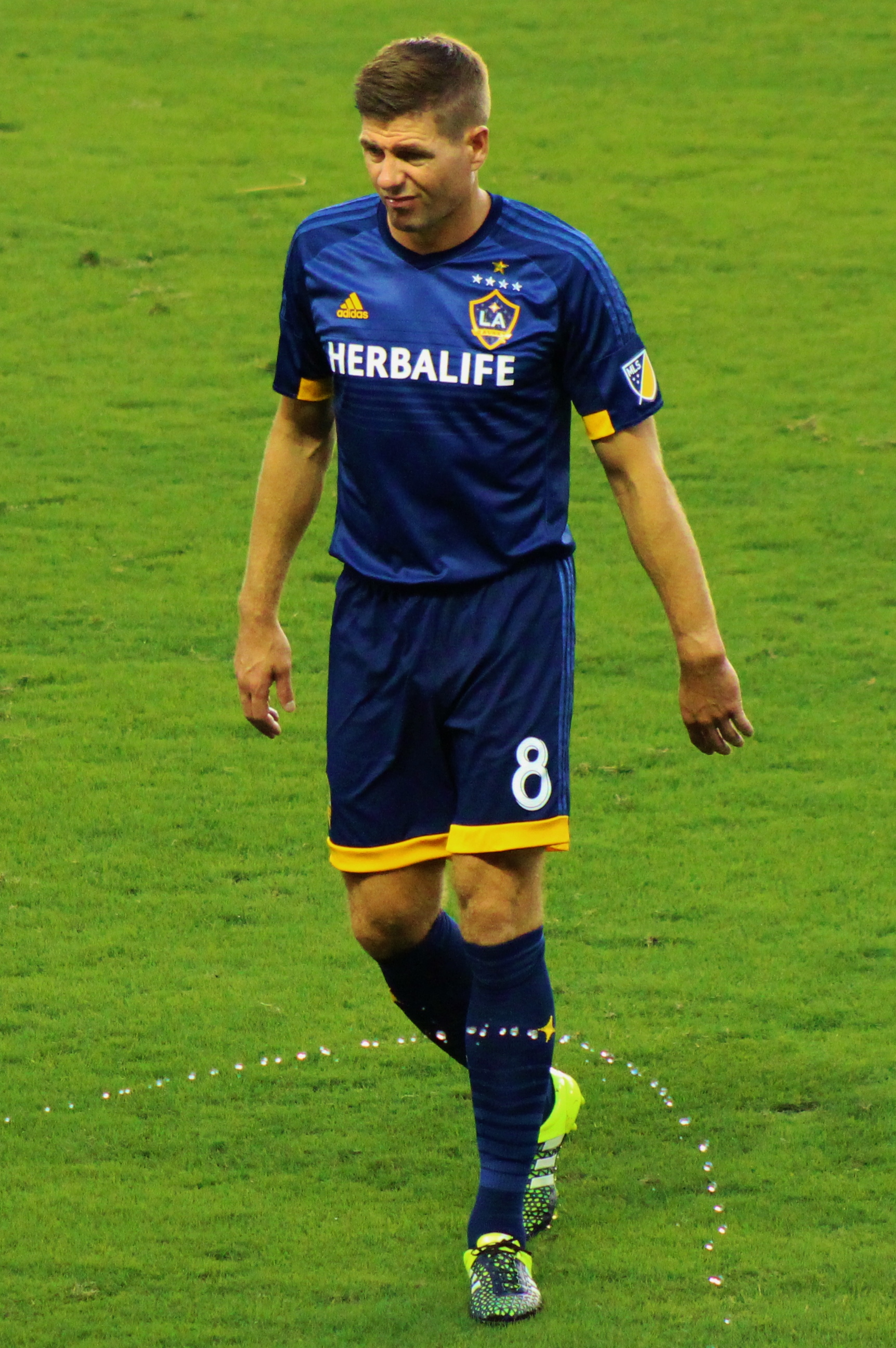
Gerrard playing for LA Galaxy in 2015

On 7 January 2015, the LA Galaxy of Major League Soccer (MLS) announced the signing of Gerrard to an 18-month Designated Player contract, reportedly worth $9 million. He joined the team in July, following the end of the 2014–15 Premier League season. On 11 July, Gerrard made his debut for LA, coming on at half time for Ignacio Maganto in a 1–0 loss at Real Salt Lake in the U.S. Open Cup quarter-finals. He made his MLS debut on 17 July, scoring once, while assisting one goal of his former Liverpool teammate Robbie Keane's hat-trick, during a 5–2 defeat of fellow Californians the San Jose Earthquakes at the StubHub Center. That month, Gerrard was one of the 22 players to be named to the 2015 MLS All-Star Game roster. He made 13 appearances across the regular season, scoring one more goal, the team's last of a 3–2 home win over FC Dallas on 27 September.

After the Galaxy were eliminated from the 2015 MLS Cup Playoffs by Seattle Sounders FC, Gerrard announced that he may retire in 2016, saying that he found unexpected difficulty in the long journeys to away matches in the United States, and the diverse altitude and weather across the country. Gerrard also concurrently worked as a pundit with BT Sport, so he had to take trans-Atlantic flights to England every few weeks. In addition, Gerrard was not popular with Los Angeles fans as the club underachieved despite their numerous star players.

Gerrard played his final game for the Galaxy on 6 November 2016 in a MLS Cup Playoff penalty shoot-out loss to Colorado Rapids. Gerrard took and scored Los Angeles' first spot-kick but the club were eliminated after Giovani dos Santos and Ashley Cole failed to convert. Nine days later, he stated he would be leaving on the expiration of his contract. He announced his retirement from professional football on 24 November, at age 36.

== International career ==
=== 2000–2004: Beginnings and early call-ups ===
Gerrard made his international debut against Ukraine on 31 May 2000. That summer, he was called up for UEFA Euro 2000, making only one appearance as a substitute in a 1–0 win over Germany before England were eliminated in the group stage. He scored his first international goal in the famous 5–1 victory over Germany in a 2002 World Cup qualifier in September 2001, and while England qualified, Gerrard was forced to pull out of the squad due to his ongoing groin problems after pulling up in Liverpool's final match of the season against Ipswich.

=== 2004–2006: FIFA World Cup debut ===
Gerrard scored his second goal for the national team in the Euro 2004 qualifier against Macedonia on 16 October 2002 in a 2–2 draw, his third goal was the opener in a 2–1 win over Serbia and Montenegro on 3 June 2003.

Before the Euros, Gerrard won the only trophy with the national team in his career – the friendly 2004 FA Summer Tournament. He was a regular starter in Euro 2004, scoring once to make it 3–0 in England's win over Switzerland in the second Group game of the tournament but England would be eliminated by the tournament hosts Portugal in the quarter-finals losing 6–5 on penalties in a match when Gerrard was substituted off in the 81st minute for Owen Hargreaves.

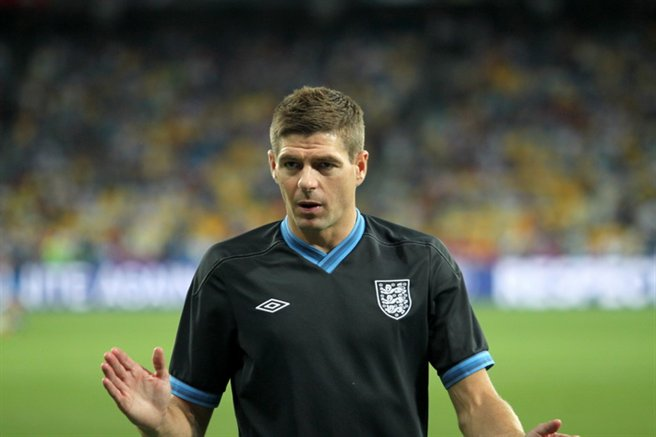
Gerrard warming up for England at UEFA Euro 2012

He participated in his first World Cup in 2006 and scored two goals, both in the group stage, against Trinidad and Tobago and Sweden, although his spot-kick was one of three saved by goalkeeper Ricardo as England again bowed out to Portugal in the quarter-finals on penalties. He was England's top scorer in the tournament.

=== 2006–2010: Vice-captaincy and "Golden Generation" ===
Gerrard was made vice-captain of the England team by coach Steve McClaren, and while he filled in for John Terry as captain, England suffered back-to-back losses to Russia and Croatia that ended their Euro 2008 qualifying hopes. After new coach Fabio Capello took over the team in early 2008, Gerrard was given a trial run as captain but Capello settled on Terry for the role. Gerrard was subsequently replaced as England vice-captain by Rio Ferdinand.

Gerrard helped England qualify for the 2010 World Cup, scoring two goals in England's 5–1 win over Croatia. Terry was replaced by Ferdinand as captain in 2010, following revelations about the former's private life, and Gerrard subsequently became vice-captain again. When the England team left for the 2010 World Cup, Gerrard was the most experienced player in the squad with 80 caps. During preparations for the 2010 FIFA World Cup, however, Rio Ferdinand was injured, meaning that Gerrard was appointed by Capello as captain for the tournament. During the tournament, he scored in England's 1–1 draw against the USA, during the group stages of the tournament. Unfortunately, England exited the tournament with a 4–1 loss against Germany.

After the tournament Gerrard, part of a group of England players dubbed the "Golden Generation", confirmed that he would continue to be available for selection, despite suggestions from Capello that he would seek to rebuild the team.

=== 2010–2014: Captaincy and international retirement ===
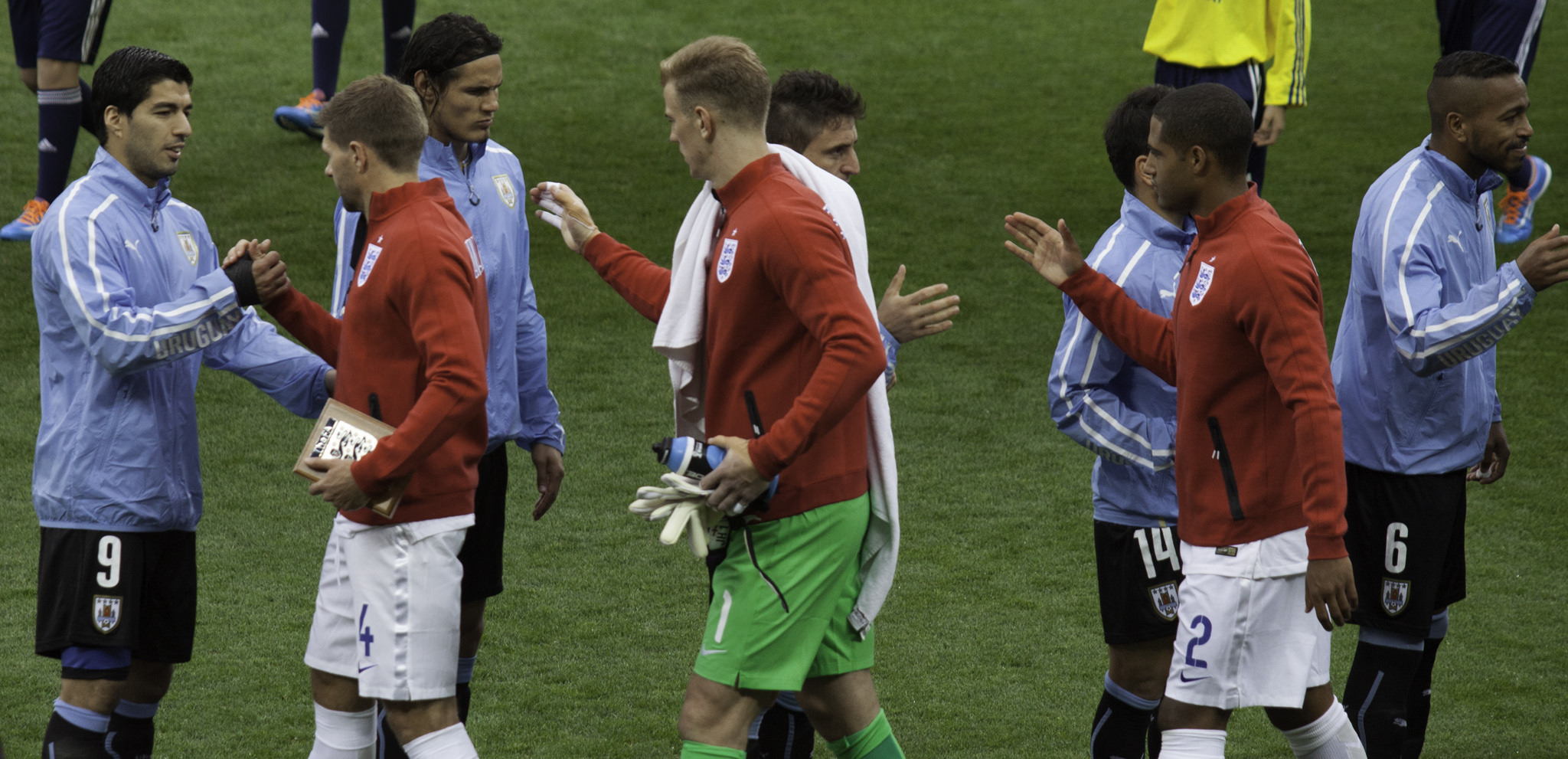
Gerrard (second from left) shaking hands with Uruguay's Luis Suárez at the 2014 FIFA World Cup, 19 June 2014

In August 2010, Gerrard scored twice in a friendly match against Hungary and helped England to a 2–1 win. Due to Ferdinand's continued absence through injury, Gerrard retained the captaincy for the opening match of the Euro 2012 qualifying campaign against Bulgaria, which England won 4–0.

Gerrard was later named permanent captain by new coach Roy Hodgson, in time for the tournament finals of the UEFA Euro. This was the first time that he was named directly the captain of England and not in place of an injured or unavailable captain. He provided three assists and won two man of the match awards to help England finish top of their group at Euro 2012. Despite their quarter-final exit on penalties to Italy, Gerrard was later the only England player to be named in the UEFA Team of the Tournament. On 14 November 2012, Gerrard won his 100th cap for England in a friendly match against Sweden.

For the 2014 FIFA World Cup, Gerrard captained England to their first group stage elimination since 1958 and their first elimination after only two matches, after two straight 1–2 defeats against Italy and Uruguay. Gerrard had played a part in both goals conceded against Uruguay courtesy of his club-mate, Luis Suárez. For England's final game against Costa Rica, Gerrard was replaced as captain by Frank Lampard and used as a substitute.

On 21 July 2014, Gerrard announced his retirement from international football. He represented England 114 times (currently the fifth-most capped player), scoring 21 goals. Jordan Henderson described Gerrard as "probably the best player this country has ever seen – not only as a player, but also as a leader and a captain."

== Style of play ==
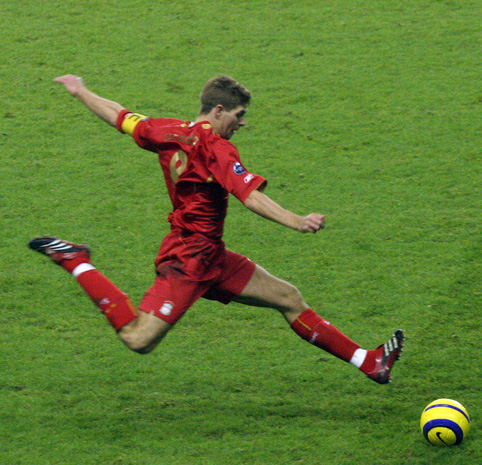
Gerrard powerfully striking the ball.

Regarded by several pundits and footballing figures as one of the greatest players of his generation, in 2009, Zinedine Zidane and Pelé considered Gerrard to be possibly the best footballer in the world. Known for his versatility and wide range of skills, he was capable of playing in many positions. A hardworking box-to-box player with great endurance in his prime, Gerrard was usually deployed as a central midfielder, but he had also been used as a second striker, a holding midfielder, an attacking midfielder, a right-back, and a right winger.

Gerrard began his professional career as a wide midfielder on the right, although he did not excel in this position as he had a tendency to commit careless fouls in his youth. Nevertheless, Liverpool retained their faith in the youngster, and he was later shifted to a defensive midfield position as he matured, where he excelled as a ball-winner rather than as a playmaker. He continued to evolve tactically, coming into his own in a box-to-box central midfield role, which allowed him to be effective both offensively and defensively; indeed, at his peak, he was known for his ability to make late runs from behind into the penalty area. Under Benítez, he was also used in a supporting and creative role, as an attacking midfielder behind the strikers, or even as a deep-lying playmaker; he was increasingly deployed in the latter position in his later career, in order to compensate for his physical decline, and due to his ability to dictate play in midfield with his vision and passing range.

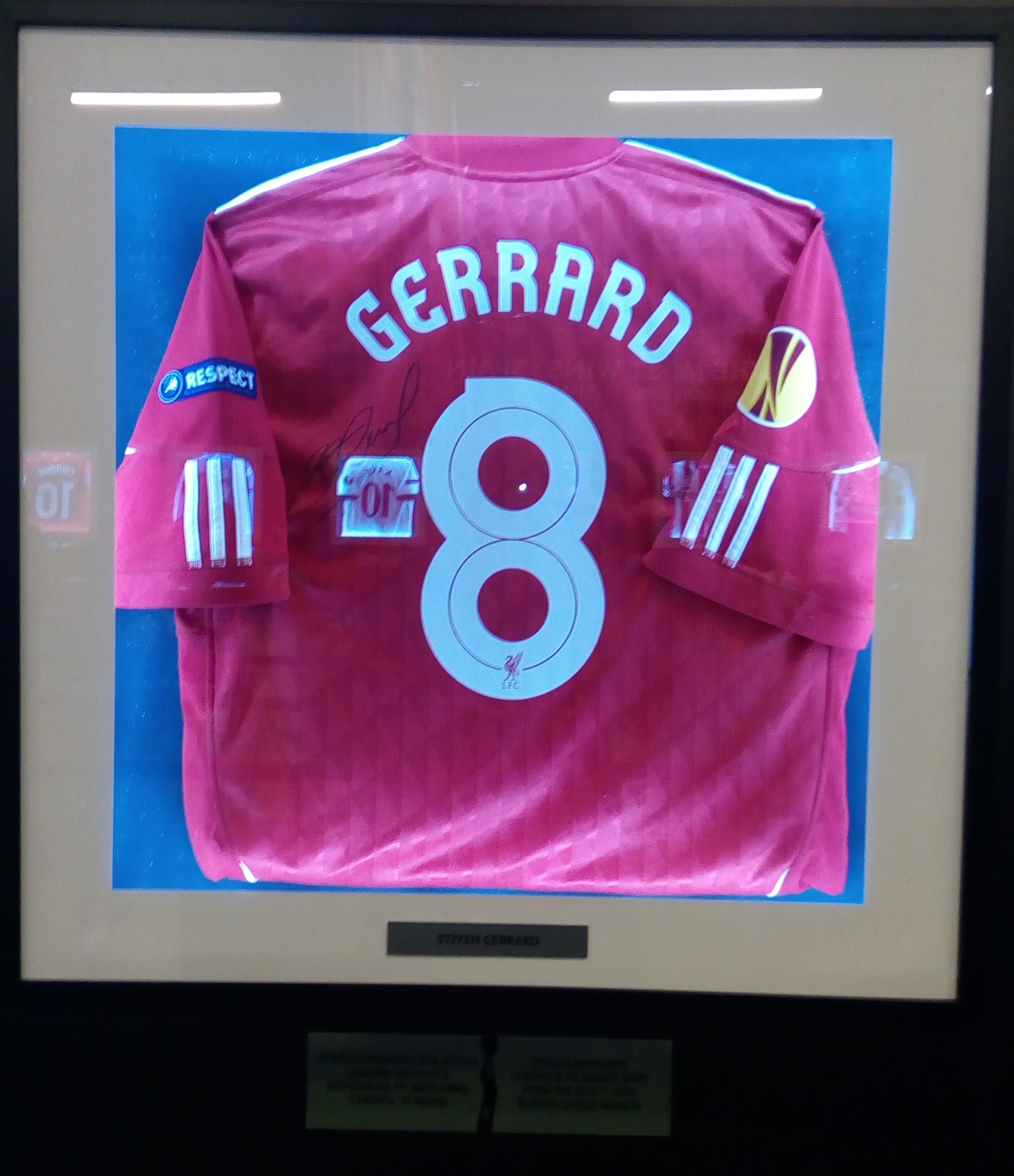
Gerrard wore number eight for most of his career.

Gerrard, naturally right footed, was able to score goals from distance due to his ball striking ability—he scored many key goals from long range throughout his career, including in three Cup finals. As he entered his mid 30s and his physical capability to get forward and join the attack declined, the number of long range strikes at goal decreased, with most of his goals coming from free kicks and penalty kicks. Defensively, his tactical intelligence and ability to read the game allowed him to break down the opposition's attacking plays. In addition to his footballing attributes, Gerrard was highly regarded for his leadership, determination, and influence on the pitch throughout his career. Despite being vocal in his criticism of diving, Gerrard was accused of diving himself by certain pundits throughout his career.

Former Spanish striker and Liverpool teammate Fernando Torres hailed Gerrard as the best player he has ever played with. He stated that, "He's as creative as a Xavi at Barcelona, with something extra as well. When you add his energy, toughness, leadership and goalscoring ability and the result is a fantastic all-round player. He is without doubt the greatest player I have ever played with, he has everything."

In 2015, a decade after the 2005 Champions League final in Istanbul, former Italy defender and AC Milan great, Paolo Maldini, recalled memories of the game and heaped praise on Gerrard claiming that, "I think Steven has been, and is, an absolutely complete player, because he had personality, technique, he could set the play and also defend, and he could score goals – penalty-kicks, free-kicks. So really a modern, complete player". He also stated that, "I have a very clear memory of the final we lost in Istanbul, when he was helping his teammates with difficulties in defence. He started playing at the back and tackled every single player of Milan. It was a very special game during which we actually dominated Liverpool for 110 minutes out of 120. But I must say that what probably made the difference was his example for all his teammates, especially after reaching a draw, in being able to defend and resist, and at the end reach a result that was sincerely and absolutely unexpected after the first 45 minutes."

== Managerial career ==
=== Early career ===
In November 2016, days before retiring as a player, Gerrard had an interview for the vacant managerial post at League One club Milton Keynes Dons, but said that he was not ready for the job.

In January 2017, he was appointed youth coach at Liverpool, effective from February. On 11 April, it was reported that Gerrard would be taking charge of the Liverpool Under-18 side ahead of the 2017–18 season after impressing Jürgen Klopp and Alex Inglethorpe with his work ethic, knowledge and attitude towards academy coaching. However, before he took the next step on the path to receive his coaching credentials, Gerrard pulled on the Liverpool shirt one last time in a friendly against Australian club Sydney FC at the end of this Premier League campaign. On 7 September 2017, the club announced Gerrard would manage the Under-19 team in the 2017–18 UEFA Youth League.

=== Rangers ===
In late April 2018, Gerrard entered talks to become the new manager of Scottish Premiership club Rangers. On 1 May, incumbent manager Graeme Murty was dismissed, with the club confirming three days later that Gerrard would succeed him from 1 June, ahead of the 2018–19 season, signing a four-year contract.

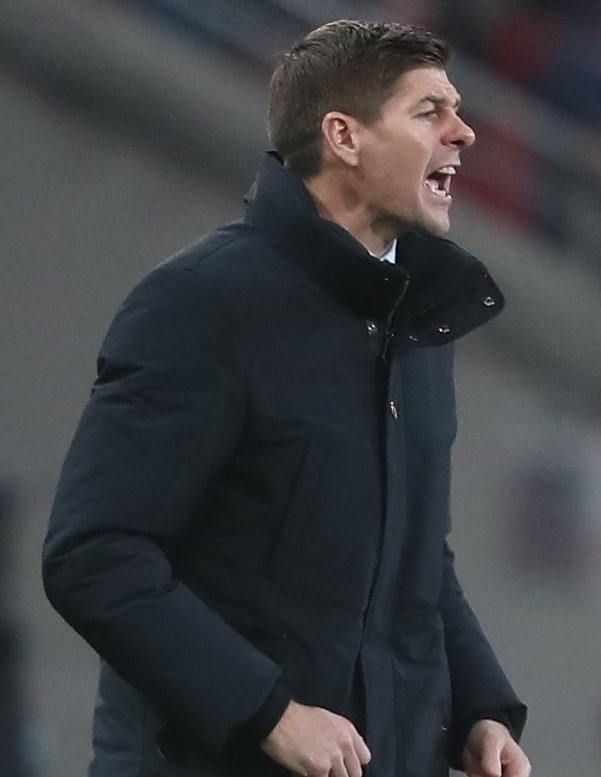
Gerrard managing Rangers in 2018

He made his senior managerial debut on 12 July, when he led Rangers to a 2–0 UEFA Europa League win over Macedonian team Shkupi. Gerrard's first game in charge in the domestic league was a 1–1 draw against Aberdeen, away from home. Under Gerrard's management, Rangers went twelve matches unbeaten in all competitions from the start of the season before finally suffering defeat on 2 September, losing 1–0 to rivals Celtic in the Old Firm derby. On 29 December, in the reverse fixture, Gerrard guided Rangers to their first win over Celtic since 2012, in a game that ended with a 1–0 scoreline.

In his second season in charge, Gerrard oversaw Rangers to finish runners-up in their group in the UEFA Europa League, the first time the club secured European football beyond Christmas for the first time since the 2010–11 season. On 29 December 2019, Gerrard's side won 2–1 against Celtic, gaining their first victory at Celtic Park since October 2010. A slump in form, including defeat to Heart of Midlothian in the Scottish Cup and Hamilton Academical in the league within five days, left Rangers 13 points adrift of Celtic in early March. As a result of the COVID-19 pandemic, play was halted later that month. On 18 May 2020, the season was curtailed and Celtic were awarded the league title, which was determined on a points-per-game regulation.

During the 2020–21 season, Gerrard led Rangers through a record-breaking season, claiming back-to-back derby wins over rivals Celtic, and topping their Europa League group. On 7 March 2021, Rangers won the Scottish Premiership title without losing a single league match, receiving 102 points and conceding only 13 goals across 38 matches. This marked Rangers' 55th Scottish title, their first since 2011, whilst it was Gerrard's first league title as a professional.

Gerrard said that Rangers' "mentality needs to change" for them to retain their Scottish Premiership title in the 2021–22 season. Rangers suffered an early exit in their first UEFA Champions League campaign since the 2011–12 season as they were defeated by Swedish club Malmö FF over two legs in the third qualifying round. This was a third consecutive defeat for Rangers for the first time since May 2015. In November 2021, it was reported that Aston Villa would make a formal approach to Rangers to speak to Gerrard over their managerial vacancy. Gerrard left Rangers with them sat top of the Scottish Premiership.

=== Aston Villa ===
On 11 November 2021, Gerrard was appointed head coach of Premier League club Aston Villa on a three-and-a-half-year contract, succeeding Dean Smith, who was dismissed four days earlier. Villa paid Rangers compensation of around £4 million to release him from his contract. He led the club to a 2–0 home win against Brighton & Hove Albion in his first game in charge.

On 11 December 2021, Gerrard faced his former side Liverpool for the first time in his managerial career, where Villa were defeated 1–0 on his return to Anfield. Results under Gerrard were generally mixed and the team finished the season in 14th place, three places lower than the previous campaign. They suffered an early exit in his FA Cup debut, losing 1–0 to Manchester United, extending their failure to win a match in the competition to seven seasons.

During his two transfer windows in charge of Villa, Gerrard oversaw a spending that exceeded £100 million, which included signing former Liverpool teammate Philippe Coutinho despite a mixed first spell on loan at the club. After winning just two of their opening 12 league games of the 2022–23 season, Gerrard was dismissed on 20 October 2022. He left with the club in 17th position, level on points with Wolverhampton Wanderers, who occupied the relegation zone.

=== Al-Ettifaq ===
On 3 July 2023, Gerrard was appointed manager of Saudi Pro League club Al-Ettifaq, signing a two-year deal. Gerard had said a month earlier that he had been invited to Saudi Arabia to "look at a potential offer" but that he would not be pursuing it. The league had begun to expand and gain worldwide attention that year, which included several high-profile players and managers joining various clubs following major investment. Gerrard won his first competitive match in charge, securing a 2–1 victory over Al-Nassr on 14 August. He maintained a positive start with five wins from his first seven games in the Saudi Pro League.

Despite signing former Liverpool teammate Jordan Henderson during the summer, Henderson would leave in the winter transfer window, terminating his contract after struggling to settle in Saudi Arabia. Heading into the winter break, the team went on a 9-game winless run across all competitions. Despite this poor run of form, on 18 January 2024, Gerrard signed a two-year contract extension, committing to the club until 2027. Gerrard oversaw a 6th-placed finish in his first season.

Gerrard started his second season with three consecutive victories. However, form began to deteriorate, with the club being defeated against second-tier club Al-Jabalain in the King's Cup in October before a defeat to local rivals Al Qadsiah days later saw Gerrard receive boos and jeers from supporters. On 29 January 2025, it was announced that Gerrard had left the club by mutual consent. He departed with Al-Ettifaq sat 12th in the Saudi Pro League, just five points above the relegation zone after only five wins in the 2024–25 season.

On 11 October 2025, Gerrard turned down the opportunity to return to Rangers, following the sacking of Russell Martin.

== Outside football ==
=== Personal life ===
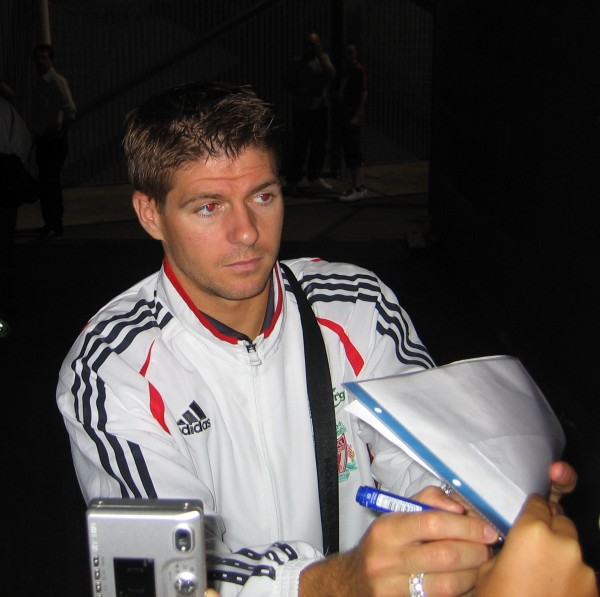
Gerrard signing autographs in 2006

Gerrard's cousin, Anthony Gerrard, became a professional centre-back. He came through at Everton, where he did not make the first team, and spent most of his career in the Football League. The two faced each other in a professional match for the first time in the 2012 Football League Cup final, when Steven's Liverpool defeated Anthony's Cardiff City in a penalty shoot-out in which both Gerrards missed. One of Gerrard's other cousins, Bobby Duncan, played for Liverpool's Academy team.

Gerrard and his wife, Alex Curran, married on 16 June 2007, the same day as the weddings of his England teammates: Gary Neville, and Michael Carrick. The ceremony took place at Cliveden House Hotel in Taplow, Buckinghamshire. They have four children together; Lilly, Lexie, Lourdes and Lio. Lilly gave birth to Gerrard's first grandchild, Lila in July 2025.

On 1 October 2007, Gerrard was involved in a low-speed collision in Southport when the car he was driving hit a ten-year-old cyclist, who had shot into the street and inadvertently crossed Gerrard's path. He later visited the boy in the hospital and presented him with a pair of boots signed by Wayne Rooney, the boy's favourite player, after which he stayed to sign autographs for other young patients.

Councillors of Knowsley voted to make Gerrard a Freeman of the Borough on 13 December 2006, and two weeks later, he was made a Member of the Order of the British Empire (MBE) in the 2007 New Year Honours for services to sport. He received an honorary fellowship from Liverpool John Moores University on 26 July 2008 as recognition for his contribution to sport.

In 2018, Amazon produced a documentary called Make Us Dream detailing the life of Gerrard from a young boy up until his post as Liverpool youth coach.

=== Autobiography ===
In September 2006, Gerrard published his first autobiography, Gerrard: My Autobiography, ghost-written by journalist Henry Winter, which went on to win the Sports Book of the Year honour at the British Book Awards. The autobiography ends with "I play for Jon-Paul". Gerrard's cousin, Jon-Paul Gilhooley, was killed in the 1989 Hillsborough disaster, when Gerrard was eight. Jon-Paul, who was 10 when he died, was the youngest of the 97 victims of the tragedy. "It was difficult knowing one of your cousins had lost his life", Gerrard said. "Seeing his family's reaction drove me on to become the player I am today.

Gerrard released a second book in 2012, Steven Gerrard: My Liverpool Story. His third volume of autobiography, My Story, written with Donald McRae, was published in September 2015. In it, he opined that the four best players to have played alongside him are former Liverpool teammates Xabi Alonso, Fernando Torres and Luis Suárez and England teammate Wayne Rooney.

=== Legal problems ===
On 29 December 2008, Gerrard was taken into custody outside the Lounge Inn in Southport on suspicion of a section 20 assault. He and two other men were later charged with assault occasioning actual bodily harm and affray, relating to an incident which left the bar's disc jockey with a broken tooth and cuts to his forehead. The three were given police to court bail and were required to appear at North Sefton Magistrates' Court on 23 January 2009, where they all pleaded not guilty. The case was adjourned until 20 March when the assault charge was dropped but Gerrard was required to attend Liverpool Crown Court to face trial for affray. On 3 April, Gerrard again pleaded not guilty.

The case went to trial in Liverpool Crown Court. Gerrard's co-defendants pleaded guilty before the trial but Gerrard maintained his innocence. Gerrard admitted hitting Marcus McGee but claimed it was in self-defence and on 24 July, Gerrard was found not guilty by the jury. Following the verdict, Gerrard said he was looking forward to getting back to playing football and putting the experience behind him.

=== Entertainment ===
In 2011, Gerrard appeared in the film Will, about an orphaned young Liverpool fan who hitchhikes to Istanbul for the 2005 UEFA Champions League final. In August 2014, Gerrard participated in the ALS Association's Ice Bucket Challenge and went on to challenge Cardiff City winger, Craig Noone.

=== Sponsorship ===
Gerrard on advertising hoarding for the sports drink Lucozade ("the fuel to rule") in Bristol, England in 2014

Gerrard has had several different sponsorships in his career including current deals with Adidas, Jaguar Cars and Lucozade. In 2014, Forbes listed his combined income from salaries, bonuses and off-field earnings at $17.2 million for the previous 12 months.

While Gerrard has worn several football boots during his career, he first wore a pair of Nike boots on his Liverpool debut, but soon signed a deal with Adidas in 1998 and has gone on to appear in many Adidas commercials with the likes of Zinedine Zidane, David Beckham, Lionel Messi and Kaká. Gerrard has worn ten versions of the Adidas Predator boot, with the Accelerator being the first, and throughout his career, he has been one of the brand's major boot endorsees. In 2013, Gerrard switched boot silos to the Nitrocharge 1.0 first wearing the boots in the League Cup clash against rivals Manchester United on 25 September 2013.

== Career statistics ==
=== Club ===
Appearances and goals by club, season and competition
Club	Season	League			National cup (Note: Includes FA Cup, U.S. Open Cup)		League cup (Note: Includes Football League Cup)		Continental		Other		Total	
Club	Season	Division	Apps	Goals	Apps	Goals	Apps	Goals	Apps	Goals	Apps	Goals	Apps	Goals
Liverpool	1998–99	Premier League	12	0	0	0	0	0	1 (Note: Appearance(s) in UEFA Cup)	0	—		13	0
Liverpool	1999–2000	Premier League	29	1	2	0	0	0	—		—		31	1
Liverpool	2000–01	Premier League	33	7	4	1	4	0	9	2	—		50	10
Liverpool	2001–02	Premier League	28	3	2	0	0	0	14 (Note: Appearances in UEFA Champions League)	1	1 (Note: Appearance in UEFA Super Cup)	0	45	4
Liverpool	2002–03	Premier League	34	5	2	0	6	2	11 (Note: Five appearances in UEFA Champions League, six appearances in UEFA Cup)	0	1 (Note: Appearance in FA Community Shield)	0	54	7
Liverpool	2003–04	Premier League	34	4	3	0	2	0	8	2	—		47	6
Liverpool	2004–05	Premier League	30	7	0	0	3	2	10	4	—		43	13
Liverpool	2005–06	Premier League	32	10	6	4	1	1	12	7	2 (Note: Appearances in FIFA Club World Championship)	1	53	23
Liverpool	2006–07	Premier League	36	7	1	0	1	1	12	3	1	0	51	11
Liverpool	2007–08	Premier League	34	11	3	3	2	1	13	6	—		52	21
Liverpool	2008–09	Premier League	31	16	3	1	0	0	10	7	—		44	24
Liverpool	2009–10	Premier League	33	9	2	1	1	0	13 (Note: Five appearances in UEFA Champions League, eight appearances and two goals in UEFA Europa League)	2	—		49	12
Liverpool	2010–11	Premier League	21	4	1	0	0	0	2 (Note: Appearances in UEFA Europa League)	4	—		24	8
Liverpool	2011–12	Premier League	18	5	6	2	4	2	—		—		28	9
Liverpool	2012–13	Premier League	36	9	1	0	1	0	8	1	—		46	10
Liverpool	2013–14	Premier League	34	13	3	1	2	0	—		—		39	14
Liverpool	2014–15	Premier League	29	9	3	2	3	0	6	2	—		41	13
Liverpool	Total		504	120	42	15	30	9	129	41	5	1	710	186
LA Galaxy	2015	Major League Soccer	13	2	1	0	—		0	0	1 (Note: Appearance in MLS Cup Playoffs)	0	15	2
LA Galaxy	2016	Major League Soccer	21	3	0	0	—		2 (Note: Appearances in CONCACAF Champions League)	0	1	0	24	3
LA Galaxy	Total		34	5	1	0	—		2	0	2	0	39	5
Career total			538	125	43	14	30	9	131	41	7	1	749	190

=== International ===
Appearances and goals by national team and year
National team	Year	Apps	Goals
England	2000	2	0
England	2001	6	1
England	2002	5	1
England	2003	8	1
England	2004	10	2
England	2005	8	1
England	2006	13	4
England	2007	11	2
England	2008	7	2
England	2009	7	2
England	2010	12	3
England	2011	0	0
England	2012	11	0
England	2013	8	2
England	2014	6	0
Total		114	21

England score listed first, score column indicates score after each Gerrard goal.

List of international goals scored by Steven Gerrard
No.	Date	Venue	Cap	Opponent	Score	Result	Competition	Ref.
1	1 September 2001	Olympiastadion, Munich, Germany	6	Germany	2–1	5–1	2002 FIFA World Cup qualification	
2	16 October 2002	St Mary's Stadium, Southampton, England	13	Macedonia	2–2	2–2	UEFA Euro 2004 qualifying	
3	3 June 2003	Walkers Stadium, Leicester, England	17	Serbia and Montenegro	1–0	2–1	Friendly	
4	17 June 2004	Estádio Cidade de Coimbra, Coimbra, Portugal	26	Switzerland	3–0	3–0	UEFA Euro 2004	
5	4 September 2004	Ernst-Happel-Stadion, Vienna, Austria	30	Austria	2–0	2–2	2006 FIFA World Cup qualification	
6	30 March 2005	St James' Park, Newcastle upon Tyne, England	34	Azerbaijan	1–0	2–0	2006 FIFA World Cup qualification	
7	30 May 2006	Old Trafford, Manchester, England	41	Hungary	1–0	3–1	Friendly	
8	15 June 2006	Frankenstadion, Nuremberg, Germany	44	Trinidad and Tobago	2–0	2–0	2006 FIFA World Cup	
9	20 June 2006	RheinEnergieStadion, Cologne, Germany	45	Sweden	2–1	2–2	2006 FIFA World Cup	
10	2 September 2006	Old Trafford, Manchester, England	49	Andorra	2–0	5–0	UEFA Euro 2008 qualifying	
11	28 March 2007	Estadi Olímpic Lluís Companys, Barcelona, Spain	55	Andorra	1–0	3–0	UEFA Euro 2008 qualifying	
12	28 March 2007	Estadi Olímpic Lluís Companys, Barcelona, Spain	55	Andorra	2–0	3–0	UEFA Euro 2008 qualifying	
13	28 May 2008	Wembley Stadium, London, England	66	United States	2–0	2–0	Friendly	
14	15 October 2008	Dinamo Stadium, Minsk, Belarus	70	Belarus	1–0	3–1	2010 FIFA World Cup qualification	
15	9 September 2009	Wembley Stadium, London, England	76	Croatia	2–0	5–1	2010 FIFA World Cup qualification	
16	9 September 2009	Wembley Stadium, London, England	76	Croatia	4–0	5–1	2010 FIFA World Cup qualification	
17	12 June 2010	Royal Bafokeng Stadium, Rustenburg, South Africa	81	United States	1–0	1–1	2010 FIFA World Cup	
18	11 August 2010	Wembley Stadium, London, England	85	Hungary	1–1	2–1	Friendly	
19	11 August 2010	Wembley Stadium, London, England	85	Hungary	2–1	2–1	Friendly	
20	6 September 2013	Wembley Stadium, London, England	104	Moldova	1–0	4–0	2014 FIFA World Cup qualification	
21	15 October 2013	Wembley Stadium, London, England	107	Poland	2–0	2–0	2014 FIFA World Cup qualification	

== Managerial statistics ==
As of match played 25 January 2025

Managerial record by team and tenure
Team	From	To	Record					Ref.
Team	From	To	P	W	D	L	Win %	Ref.
Rangers	1 June 2018	11 November 2021	193	125	42	26	64.8	
Aston Villa	11 November 2021	20 October 2022	40	13	8	19	32.5	
Al-Ettifaq	3 July 2023	29 January 2025	59	23	16	20	39.0	
Total			292	161	66	65	55.1	

== Honours ==
=== Player ===
Liverpool

- FA Cup: 2000–01, 2005–06; runner-up: 2011–12
- Football League Cup: 2000–01, 2002–03, 2011–12; runner-up: 2004–05
- FA Community Shield: 2006
- UEFA Champions League: 2004–05; runner-up: 2006–07
- UEFA Cup: 2000–01
- UEFA Super Cup: 2001
- FIFA Club World Championship runner-up: 2005

Individual

- UEFA Club Footballer of the Year: 2005
- PFA Players' Player of the Year: 2005–06
- PFA Young Player of the Year: 2000–01
- PFA Premier League Team of the Year: 2000–01, 2003–04, 2004–05, 2005–06, 2006–07, 2007–08, 2008–09, 2013–14
- PFA Fans' Player of the Year: 2000–01, 2008–09
- PFA Merit Award: 2015
- FWA Footballer of the Year: 2008–09
- Onze d'Argent: 2005
- FA England Player of the Year Award: 2007, 2012
- Liverpool Player of the Season: 2004, 2006, 2007, 2009
- Liverpool Fans Online Player of the Season: 2005, 2007
- FA Cup final Man of the Match: 2006
- FIFA FIFPro World XI: 2007, 2008, 2009
- UEFA Team of the Year: 2005, 2006, 2007
- UEFA Ultimate Team of the Year
- UEFA Champions League final Man of The Match: 2005
- UEFA European Championship Team of the Tournament: 2012
- ESM Team of the Year: 2008–09
- Premier League Player of the Month: March 2001, March 2003, December 2004, April 2006, March 2009, March 2014
- Most assists in the Premier League: 2013–14
- Premier League 20 Seasons Awards (1992–93 to 2011–12), Fantasy Team (public choice)
- English Football Hall of Fame: 2017
- FIFA Club World Championship Silver Ball: 2005
- Premier League Hall of Fame: 2021
- MLS All-Star: 2015
- Honorary Fellowship from Liverpool John Moores University: 2008

=== Manager ===
Rangers

- Scottish Premiership: 2020–21
- Scottish League Cup runner-up: 2019–20

Individual

- SFWA Manager of the Year: 2020–21
- PFA Scotland Manager of the Year: 2020–21
- SPFL Premiership Manager of the Year: 2020–21
- LMA Special Achievement Award: 2020–21
- Scottish Premiership Manager of the Month: April 2019, September 2019, December 2019, August 2020, October 2020, November 2020, February 2021

=== Orders ===
- Member of the Order of the British Empire: 2007

== See also ==
- List of footballers in England by number of league appearances (500+)
- List of men's footballers with 100 or more international caps
