= David Breda (footballer, born 1971) =

Czech former football midfielder

Personal information
- Date of birth: 22 November 1971 (age 54)
- Place of birth: Czechoslovakia
- Height: 1.75 m (5 ft 9 in)
- Position: Midfielder

Senior career*
| Years | Team | Apps | (Gls) |
| 1993–1994 | SK Hradec Králové | 43 | (9) |
| 1995–1997 | FK Jablonec | 59 | (7) |
| 1997–2000 | FC Slovan Liberec | 84 | (6) |
| 2001–2002 | Fortuna Düsseldorf | 26 | (1) |
| 2002–2003 | SK Hradec Králové | 22 | (3) |
- * Club domestic league appearances and goals

David Breda (born 22 November 1971) is a Czech former football midfielder. He played in the Gambrinus liga, making over 200 league appearances. He scored in the UEFA Cup for Liberec against Liverpool in November 2000. In 2011, at the age of 39, Breda was still playing in the Czech leagues, for Czech Fourth Division side SK Převýšov.
