= 2010–11 FC Twente season =

Twente
2010–11 season
- Manager: Michel Preud'homme
- Stadium: De Grolsch Veste
- Eredivisie: 2nd
- KNVB Cup: Winners
- Johan Cruyff Shield: Winners
- UEFA Champions League: Group stage
- UEFA Europa League: Quarter-finals
- Top goalscorer: League: Marc Janko (14)
- Biggest win: 5–0 v Vitesse (Home, 21 December 2010, KNVB Cup); 5–0 v Heracles (Home, 19 January 2011, Eredivisie)
- Biggest defeat: 2–6 v Heerenveen (Away, 12 December 2010, Eredivisie); 1–5 v Villarreal (Away, 7 April 2011, UEFA Europa League)
Home colours	Away colours	Third colours

The 2010–11 season was Football Club Twente's 27th consecutive season in the Eredivisie and 46th season in existence as a football club. In addition to the domestic league, Twente participated in the KNVB Cup, the Johan Cruyff Shield, the UEFA Champions League and the UEFA Europa League.

== Squad ==
Squad at end of season

Note: Flags indicate national team as defined under FIFA eligibility rules; some limited exceptions apply. Players may hold more than one non-FIFA nationality.

No.	Pos.	Nation	Player
1	GK	NED	Sander Boschker
2	DF	USA	Oguchi Onyewu
3	DF	NED	Nicky Kuiper
4	DF	NED	Peter Wisgerhof
5	DF	SWE	Rasmus Bengtsson
6	MF	NED	Wout Brama
7	MF	NED	Denny Landzaat
8	MF	NED	Theo Janssen
9	FW	NED	Luuk de Jong
10	FW	CRC	Bryan Ruiz
11	MF	SWE	Emir Bajrami
13	GK	BUL	Nikolay Mihaylov
15	DF	VEN	Roberto Rosales
16	GK	NED	Wilko de Vogt
17	MF	NED	Arnold Bruggink
19	DF	BRA	Douglas
20	MF	NED	Steven Berghuis
21	FW	AUT	Marc Janko
22	MF	BEL	Nacer Chadli
23	MF	BEL	Bart Buysse

No.	Pos.	Nation	Player
25	MF	NED	Alexander Bannink
30	GK	NED	Nick Marsman
33	DF	NED	Dwight Tiendalli
34	DF	GER	Thilo Leugers
35	DF	NED	Thijs Bouma
37	DF	NED	Mitch Stockentree
38	GK	POL	Filip Bednarek
39	FW	NED	Ninos Gouriye
44	FW	NED	Ola John
45	DF	NED	Sander van Aken
46	DF	GER	Nils Röseler
48	FW	GER	Mirco Born
52	DF	NED	Leon van Dijk
53	DF	NED	Joey Pelupessy
55	DF	NED	Mark Engberink
56	MF	NED	Quincy Promes
57	FW	SVK	Filip Oršula
59	FW	NED	Cas Peters
62	MF	FIN	Tuomas Rannankari
70	MF	BRA	Bruno Smith

== Competitions ==
=== Overview ===
Competition	First match	Last match	Starting round	Final position	Record							
Competition	First match	Last match	Starting round	Final position	Pld	W	D	L	GF	GA	GD	Win %
Eredivisie	6 August 2010	15 May 2011	Matchday 1	2nd	34	21	8	5	65	34	+31	61.76
KNVB Cup	22 September 2010	8 May 2011	Third round	Winners	6	4	2	0	15	5	+10	66.67
Johan Cruyff Shield	31 July 2010		Final	Winners	1	1	0	0	1	0	+1	100.00
UEFA Champions League	14 September 2010	7 December 2010	Group stage	Group stage	6	1	3	2	9	11	−2	16.67
UEFA Europa League	17 February 2011	14 April 2011	Round of 32	Quarter-finals	6	2	1	3	9	12	−3	33.33
Total					53	29	14	10	99	62	+37	54.72

Source: Competitions

=== Eredivisie ===
==== League table ====
Pos	Team	Pld	W	D	L	GF	GA	GD	Pts	Qualification or relegation
1	Ajax (C)	34	22	7	5	72	30	+42	73	Qualification to Champions League group stage
2	Twente	34	21	8	5	65	34	+31	71	Qualification to Champions League third qualifying round
3	PSV	34	20	9	5	79	34	+45	69	Qualification to Europa League play-off round (Note: Since both 2010–11 KNVB Cup finalists, Twente and Ajax, qualified for the Champions League, allocation of the 2011–12 UEFA Europa League spots was based upon the final league standings, with the cup-winners spot going to the third-placed team and the regular spots available through league placement awarded to the next best teams below.)
4	AZ	34	17	8	9	55	44	+11	59	Qualification to Europa League third qualifying round
5	Groningen	34	17	6	11	65	52	+13	57	Qualification to European competition play-offs

Source: eredivisie.nl (in Dutch)
Rules for classification: 1) points; 2) goal difference; 3) number of goals scored.
(C) Champions

==== Results summary ====
Overall								Home						Away					
Pld	W	D	L	GF	GA	GD	Pts	W	D	L	GF	GA	GD	W	D	L	GF	GA	GD
34	21	8	5	65	34	+31	71	12	4	1	38	13	+25	9	4	4	27	21	+6

Source: Soccerway

==== Results by round ====
Round	1	2	3	4	5	6	7	8	9	10	11	12	13	14	15	16	17	18	19	20	21	22	23	24	25	26	27	28	29	30	31	32	33	34
Ground	A	H	A	H	A	A	H	H	A	H	A	A	H	A	H	A	H	A	H	A	H	A	H	H	A	H	H	A	H	H	A	A	H	A
Result	D	D	W	W	W	D	D	W	W	W	W	W	W	L	L	W	W	L	W	W	W	D	W	D	L	W	W	W	W	D	D	W	W	L
Position	10	14	6	3	3	4	4	3	3	2	2	1	1	2	2	2	2	2	2	2	2	2	2	2	2	2	2	2	1	1	2	1	1	2
Points	1	2	5	8	11	12	13	16	19	22	25	28	31	31	31	34	37	37	40	43	46	47	50	51	51	54	57	60	63	64	65	68	71	71

Source: Worldfootball.net
A = Away; H = Home; W = Win; D = Draw; L = Loss

==== Matches ====
6 August 2010 1	Roda JC	0–0	Twente	Kerkrade
20:45 CEST (UTC+2)	Delorge (yellow card) 69'	Report	Brama (yellow card) 44'; Janssen (yellow card) 47'; Tioté (yellow card) 55'	Stadium: Parkstad Limburg Stadion

14 August 2010 2	Twente	0–0	Heerenveen	Enschede
20:45 CEST (UTC+2)		Report	Assaidi (yellow card) 31'; Kopic (yellow card) 59'; Väyrynen (yellow card) 61'	Stadium: De Grolsch Veste

21 August 2010 3	Vitesse Arnhem	0–3	Twente	Arnhem
18:45 CEST (UTC+2)	Snijders (yellow card) 38'; Nilsson (yellow card) 80'	Report	Buysse (yellow card) 57'; Janko 58'; L. de Jong 66', 90'	Stadium: GelreDome

29 August 2010 4	Twente	4–0	Utrecht	Enschede
14:30 CEST (UTC+2)	Janko (yellow card) 64', (yellow card) 69'; L. de Jong (yellow card) 78'	Report	Nijholt (yellow card) 85'	Stadium: De Grolsch Veste

11 September 2010 5	VVV-Venlo	1–2	Twente	Venlo
18:45 CEST (UTC+2)	Paauwe (yellow card) 22', (goal) 42' (pen.); Verbeek (yellow card) 37'; Linssen (yellow card) 63'; Chula (yellow card) 81'	Report	Ruiz 29'; Chadli (yellow card) 41'; Rosales 70'; Tiendalli (yellow card) 87'	Stadium: De Koel

19 September 2010 6	Heracles	0–0	Twente	Almelo
16:30 CEST (UTC+2)	Everton (yellow card) 29'; Fledderus (yellow card) 43' (red card) 45'; Breukers (yellow card) 63'	Report	Douglas (yellow card) 90'	Stadium: Polman Stadion

25 September 2010 7	Twente	2–2	Ajax	Enschede
20:45 CEST (UTC+2)	Janssen 11', 62'	Report	El Hamdaoui 15'; Enoh 68'	Stadium: De Grolsch Veste

3 October 2010 8	Twente	4–2	Groningen	Enschede
14:30 CEST (UTC+2)	Douglas (yellow card) 27'; Ruiz 30', 49' (pen.); Janssen (yellow card) 58', (goal) 88'; Janko 72'	Report	Granqvist 28' (pen.); Tadić (yellow card) 48'; Pedersen (yellow card) 68'; Lachman (yellow card) 71'; Matavž 75'	Stadium: De Grolsch Veste

16 October 2010 9	Feyenoord	0–1	Twente	Rotterdam
20:45 CEST (UTC+2)		Report	Janko (yellow card) 12'; Douglas (yellow card) 74'; Landzaat 78'	Stadium: De Kuip

24 October 2010 10	Twente	3–2	ADO Den Haag	Enschede
14:30 CEST (UTC+2)	Janssen 27'; Rosales (yellow card) 45'; Ruiz 57' (pen.); Janko 70'	Report	Kubík (yellow card) 10', (goal) 54'; Bulykin 44'; Bosschaart (yellow card) 56'; Verhoek (yellow card) 58'	Stadium: De Grolsch Veste

27 October 2010 11	Willem II	1–3	Twente	Tilburg
20:00 CEST (UTC+2)	Van Zaanen 15'; Halilović (yellow card) 39'	Report	L. de Jong 28', 64'; Douglas 37'; Rosales (yellow card) 74'; Tiendalli (yellow card) 79'	Stadium: Koning Willem II Stadion

30 October 2010 12	PSV	0–1	Twente	Eindhoven
20:45 CEST (UTC+2)	Vuković (red card) 84'; Bouma (yellow card) 86'; Amrabat (yellow card) 90'	Report	Leugers (yellow card) 38'; Janssen (yellow card) 40'; Wisgerhof (yellow card) 51'; Chadli 60'; Schimpelsberger (yellow card) 69'; L. de Jong (yellow card) 90'	Stadium: Philips Stadion

6 November 2010 13	Twente	2–1	Excelsior	Enschede
18:45 CEST (UTC+2)	Chadli 26'; Vujičević (yellow card) 33'; Janko 75'	Report	Van Steensel 2', (yellow card) 40'; Nieveld (yellow card) 90'	Stadium: De Grolsch Veste

13 November 2010 14	NAC Breda	2–1	Twente	Breda
20:45 CEST (UTC+2)	Boussaboun 81'; Gilissen (yellow card) 84'; Amoah 90'	Report	Ruiz 21'	Stadium: Rat Verlegh Stadion

20 November 2010 15	Twente	1–2	AZ	Enschede
19:45 CEST (UTC+2)	L. de Jong 17'; Douglas (red card) 31'; Janssen (yellow card) 90'	Report	R. Elm 32'; Ortiz 63'; Moisander (yellow card) 73'; Schaars (yellow card) 90'	Stadium: De Grolsch Veste

27 November 2010 16	NEC	2–4	Twente	Nijmegen
20:45 CEST (UTC+2)	Sibum 9'; Vleminckx 74'	Report	Ruiz 18', 44' (pen.); Rosales (yellow card) 31'; Janko 40', 79'	Stadium: Goffertstadion

4 December 2010 17	Twente	2–0	De Graafschap	Enschede
20:45 CEST (UTC+2)	Janssen 8', 69'; Brama (yellow card) 77'	Report		Stadium: De Grolsch Veste

12 December 2010 18	Heerenveen	6–2	Twente	Heerenveen
14:30 CEST (UTC+2)	Assaidi 20', 38', 87'; Väyrynen (yellow card) 58', (goal) 89' (pen.); V. Elm 63'; Koning (yellow card) 67'; Narsingh 74'	Report	Chadli 32', 51'; Vujičević (yellow card) 55'	Stadium: Abe Lenstra Stadion

19 January 2011 19	Twente	5–0	Heracles	Enschede
18:45 CEST (UTC+2)	Janko 4', 45', 60', 70'; L. de Jong 39'	Report	Looms (yellow card) 83'	Stadium: De Grolsch Veste

23 January 2011 20	Groningen	1–2	Twente	Groningen
14:30 CEST (UTC+2)	Matavž 33'; Holla (yellow card) 42'; Ivens (yellow card) 84'; Kieftenbeld (yellow card) 90'	Report	Landzaat (yellow card) 20'; Janko 40', 82', (yellow card) 74'; Onyewu (yellow card) 43'; Chadli (yellow card) 90'	Stadium: Euroborg

30 January 2011 21	Twente	2–1	Feyenoord	Enschede
14:30 CEST (UTC+2)	Brama 76'; Ruiz 90'	Report	Swerts 52'	Stadium: De Grolsch Veste

6 February 2011 22	Utrecht	1–1	Twente	Utrecht
14:30 CEST (UTC+2)	De Kogel 37', (yellow card) 47'; Asare (yellow card) 88'	Report	Wisgerhof (yellow card) 14'; Chadli 50'; L. de Jong (yellow card) 60'; Leugers (yellow card) 77'; Rosales (yellow card) 84'; Bajrami (yellow card) 90'; Douglas (yellow card) 90'	Stadium: Stadion Galgenwaard

12 February 2011 23	Twente	1–0	Vitesse Arnhem	Enschede
19:45 CEST (UTC+2)	Chadli 39'; Rosales (yellow card) 45'	Report	Rajković (yellow card) 19'; Yasuda (yellow card) 65'	Stadium: De Grolsch Veste

20 February 2011 24	Twente	1–1	NEC	Enschede
14:30 CEST (UTC+2)	Bajrami 27'; Onyewu (yellow card) 38'; Janssen (yellow card) 42'; Buysse (yellow card) 64'	Report	Zimling 7'; Nuytinck (yellow card) 10'; Sibum (yellow card) 45'; Davids (yellow card) 52'; Will (yellow card) 70'; Vleminckx (yellow card) 82'; Zomer (yellow card) 87'	Stadium: De Grolsch Veste

27 February 2011 25	AZ	2–1	Twente	Alkmaar
14:30 CEST (UTC+2)	Janssen (yellow card) 26'; Viergever (red card) 63'; Wernbloom (yellow card) 85'; Falkenburg 90'	Report	Douglas (red card) 43'; L. de Jong 88'	Stadium: AFAS Stadion

5 March 2011 26	Twente	2–0	NAC Breda	Enschede
18:45 CEST (UTC+2)	Bajrami (yellow card) 23'; L. de Jong 61'; Chadli 90+2'	Report	Kolkka (yellow card) 51'; Gorter (yellow card) 90'	Stadium: De Grolsch Veste

13 March 2011 27	Twente	2–1	VVV-Venlo	Enschede
14:30 CEST (UTC+2)	Rosales (yellow card) 20'; Brama 30'; Buysse (yellow card) 38'; John 83'	Report	De Regt 3'; Boymans (yellow card) 43'; Uchebo (yellow card) 48'; Vujičević (yellow card) 76'	Stadium: De Grolsch Veste

20 March 2011 28	Excelsior	0–2	Twente	Rotterdam
14:30 CEST (UTC+2)	Fernandez (yellow card) 51'; Ramsteijn (red card) 67'	Report	Janssen 37', 68' (pen.)	Stadium: Stadion Woudestein

2 April 2011 29	Twente	2–0	PSV	Enschede
18:45 CEST (UTC+2)	Janssen 64' (pen.), 82'; Buysse (yellow card) 71'	Report	Hutchinson (yellow card) 60'; Marcelo (yellow card) 64'; Dzsudzsák (yellow card) 75'	Stadium: De Grolsch Veste

10 April 2011 30	Twente	1–1	Roda JC	Enschede
14:30 CEST (UTC+2)	Janssen (yellow card) 8', (yellow card) 85'; Buysse (yellow card) 73'; Rosales (red card) 90'	Report	Hempte (yellow card) 24'; Skoubo (yellow card) 47'; Bodor (yellow card) 76'; Junker (yellow card) 78'; Prus (red card) 83'	Stadium: De Grolsch Veste

17 April 2011 31	De Graafschap	1–1	Twente	Doetinchem
14:30 CEST (UTC+2)	Meijer (yellow card) 50', (goal) 89'	Report	Landzaat 72'	Stadium: De Vijverberg

22 April 2011 32	ADO Den Haag	1–2	Twente	The Hague
20:45 CEST (UTC+2)	Derijck (yellow card) 65'; Bulykin 70'	Report	L. de Jong (yellow card) 18', (goal) 85'; Ruiz 61'	Stadium: Kyocera Stadion

1 May 2011 33	Twente	4–0	Willem II	Enschede
14:30 CEST (UTC+2)	L. de Jong 39'; Douglas 50'; Jelić 60' (o.g.); Janssen 77' (pen.)	Report	Ippel (yellow card) 76'	Stadium: De Grolsch Veste

15 May 2011 34	Ajax	3–1	Twente	Amsterdam
14:30 CEST (UTC+2)	S. de Jong 23', 78'; Landzaat 46' (o.g.); Anita (yellow card) 74'	Report	Janssen 48', (yellow card) 89'; Douglas (yellow card) 55'; Rosales (yellow card) 80'	Stadium: Amsterdam ArenA

=== KNVB Cup ===
22 September 2010 Third round	Capelle	1–4	Twente	Rotterdam
20:00 CEST (UTC+2)	Da Silva 39'; Bosscha (yellow card); Tol (yellow card)	Report	Parker 40'; Ruiz 54' (pen.); Chadli 58'; L. de Jong 80'	Stadium: Stadion Woudestein; Attendance: 2,800; Referee: Jack van Hulten

9 November 2010 Fourth round	Zwolle	1–1 (a.e.t.) (3–5 p)	Twente	Zwolle
20:45 CEST (UTC+2)	Ars (yellow card) 20'; Wildschut 87', (yellow card) 88'	Report	Chadli 81'; Landzaat (yellow card) 101'	Stadium: FC Zwolle Stadion; Attendance: 10,500; Referee: Ed Janssen; Assistant referees: Rob Meenhuis, Mark Strijker
Note: Twente won 5–3 on penalties.

21 December 2010 Fifth round	Twente	5–0	Vitesse Arnhem	Enschede
20:45 CEST (UTC+2)	Janssen 29', 37'; L. de Jong 32', 60'; Chadli 44'	Report	Rajković (yellow card) 31'; Kingston (yellow card) 48'; Jenner (yellow card) 61'	Stadium: De Grolsch Veste; Attendance: 23,000; Referee: Kevin Blom; Assistant referees: Wilco Lobbert, Wijnand Rutgers

26 January 2011 Quarter-finals	Twente	1–1 (a.e.t.) (7–6 p)	PSV	Enschede
20:45 CEST (UTC+2)	Janssen 70' (pen.); Brama (yellow card) 73'	Report	Engelaar (yellow card) 69'; Manolev (yellow card) 75'; Toivonen (yellow card) 86'; Koevermans 90'; Dzsudzsák (yellow card) 107'	Stadium: De Grolsch Veste; Attendance: 21,000; Referee: Pieter Vink; Assistant referees: Nicky Siebert, Dave Goossens
	Penalties
	Janssen (penalty scored); Landzaat (penalty scored); Chadli (penalty scored); Janko (penalty scored); Douglas (penalty scored); L. de Jong (penalty scored); Tiendalli (penalty scored)		(penalty scored) Hutchinson; (penalty scored) Manolev; (penalty scored) Berg; (penalty scored) Toivonen; (penalty scored) Dzsudzsák; (penalty scored) Koevermans; (penalty missed) Engelaar
Note: Twente won 7–6 on penalties.

2 March 2011 Semi-finals	Twente	1–0	Utrecht	Enschede
20:45 CEST (UTC+2)	Janko (yellow card) 22', (goal) 77'; Buysse (yellow card) 90'	Report	Cornelisse (yellow card) (red card) 20'; Van der Maarel (yellow card) 49'	Stadium: De Grolsch Veste; Attendance: 21,800; Referee: Pol van Boekel; Assistant referees: Bas van Dongen, Jaap Pool

8 May 2011 Final	Twente	3–2 (a.e.t.)	Ajax	Rotterdam
18:00 CEST (UTC+2)	Douglas (yellow card) 24'; Brama 45', (yellow card) 82'; Janssen 56', (yellow card) 83'; L. de Jong (yellow card) 90'; Janko 118'	Report	De Zeeuw 20', (yellow card) 49'; Ebecilio 40'; Blind (yellow card) 86'; Enoh (yellow card) 102'; Cvitanich (yellow card) 112'	Stadium: De Kuip; Attendance: 45,000; Referee: Kevin Blom; Assistant referees: Nicky Siebert, Patrick Langkamp

=== Johan Cruyff Shield ===
As the defending Eredivisie champions, Twente faced reigning KNVB Cup winners Ajax in the Johan Cruyff Shield.

31 July 2010 Final	Ajax	0–1	Twente	Amsterdam
20:00 CEST (UTC+2)	Suárez (yellow card) (red card) 43'; Anita (yellow card) 89'	Report	L. de Jong 8', (yellow card) 54'; Bajrami (yellow card) 78'; Tioté (yellow card) 88'	Stadium: Amsterdam ArenA; Attendance: 25,000; Referee: Kevin Blom; Assistant referees: Nicky Siebert, Patrick Langkamp

=== UEFA Champions League ===
==== Group stage ====
Pos	Team	Pld	W	D	L	GF	GA	GD	Pts	Qualification	TOT	INT	TWE	BRM
1	(England) Tottenham Hotspur	6	3	2	1	18	11	+7	11	Advance to knockout phase	—	3–1	4–1	3–0
2	(Italy) Internazionale	6	3	1	2	12	11	+1	10	Advance to knockout phase	4–3	—	1–0	4–0
3	(Netherlands) Twente	6	1	3	2	9	11	−2	6	Transfer to Europa League	3–3	2–2	—	1–1
4	(Germany) Werder Bremen	6	1	2	3	6	12	−6	5		2–2	3–0	0–2	—

Source: Soccerway

14 September 2010 1	Twente (Netherlands)	2–2	(Italy) Internazionale	Enschede, Netherlands
20:45 CEST (UTC+2)	Janssen 20'; Milito 30' (o.g.); Douglas (yellow card) 90+3'	Report	Sneijder 13'; Eto'o 41'; Maicon (yellow card) 48'	Stadium: De Grolsch Veste; Attendance: 23,800; Referee: Pedro Proença (Portugal); Assistant referees: Tiago Trigo (Portugal), Ricardo Santos (Portugal); Fourth official: Hugo Miguel (Portugal); Goal-line assistants: João Ferreira (Portugal), João Capela (Portugal)

29 September 2010 2	Tottenham Hotspur (England)	4–1	(Netherlands) Twente	London, England
19:45 BST (UTC+1)	Van der Vaart (penalty missed) 41', (yellow card) 43' (yellow-red card) 61', (goal) 47'; Pavlyuchenko 50' (pen.), 64' (pen.); Bale 85'	Report	Mihaylov (yellow card) 40'; Kuiper (yellow card) 54'; Chadli 56'; Rosales (yellow card) 80'	Stadium: White Hart Lane; Attendance: 32,518; Referee: Terje Hauge (Norway); Assistant referees: Kim Thomas Haglund (Norway), Frank Andås (Norway); Fourth official: Roy Helge Olsen (Norway); Goal-line assistants: Espen Berntsen (Norway), Tom Harald Hagen (Norway)

20 October 2010 3	Twente (Netherlands)	1–1	(Germany) Werder Bremen	Enschede, Netherlands
20:45 CEST (UTC+2)	Brama (yellow card) 45+1'; Tiendalli (yellow card) 61'; Janssen 75'	Report	Fritz (yellow card) 18'; Arnautović 80'	Stadium: De Grolsch Veste; Attendance: 24,000; Referee: Claus Bo Larsen (Denmark); Assistant referees: Henrik Sønderby (Denmark), Anders Nørrestrand (Denmark); Fourth official: Kenn Hansen (Denmark); Goal-line assistants: Lars Christoffersen (Denmark), Henrik Nystrup Kragh (Denmark)

2 November 2010 4	Werder Bremen (Germany)	0–2	(Netherlands) Twente	Bremen, Germany
20:45 CET (UTC+1)	Frings (red card) 75'	Report	Douglas (yellow card) 41'; Leugers (yellow card) 62'; Bengtsson (yellow card) 68'; Chadli 81'; L. de Jong 84'	Stadium: Weserstadion; Attendance: 29,641; Referee: Alain Hamer (Luxembourg); Assistant referees: François Mangen (Luxembourg), Christian Holtgen (Luxembourg); Fourth official: Luc Wilmes (Luxembourg); Goal-line assistants: Albert Toussaint (Luxembourg), Serge Parage (Luxembourg)

24 November 2010 5	Internazionale (Italy)	1–0	(Netherlands) Twente	Milan, Italy
20:45 CET (UTC+1)	Cambiasso 55'; Córdoba (yellow card) 75'	Report	Leugers (yellow card) 73'	Stadium: San Siro; Attendance: 29,466; Referee: Stéphane Lannoy (France); Assistant referees: Eric Dansault, Michael Annonier; Fourth official: Philippe Kalt; Goal-line assistants: Antony Gautier, Ruddy Buquet

7 December 2010 6	Twente (Netherlands)	3–3	(England) Tottenham Hotspur	Enschede, Netherlands
20:45 CET (UTC+1)	Landzaat 22' (pen.); Rosales 56'; Chadli 64'	Report	Wisgerhof 12' (o.g.); Jenas (yellow card) 32'; Defoe 47', 59'	Stadium: De Grolsch Veste; Attendance: 24,000; Referee: Carlos Velasco Carballo (Spain); Assistant referees: Roberto Alonso Fernández (Spain), Jesús Calvo Guadamuro (Spain); Fourth official: Xavier Estrada Fernández (Spain); Goal-line assistants: Fernando Teixeira Vitienes (Spain), César Muñiz Fernández (Spain)

=== UEFA Europa League ===
==== Knockout phase ====
===== Round of 32 =====
17 February 2011 First leg	Rubin Kazan (Russia)	0–2	(Netherlands) Twente	Moscow, Russia (Note: The match was relocated to Luzhniki Stadium in Moscow after concerns about the poor condition of the pitch at Central Stadium in Kazan rendered it unsuitable for play.)
15:00 MSK (UTC+3)	Ansaldi (yellow card) 70'	Report	Landzaat (yellow card) 25'; Rosales (yellow card) 33'; Janssen (yellow card) 34'; L. de Jong 77'; Wisgerhof 88'	Stadium: Luzhniki Stadium; Attendance: 657; Referee: Robert Schörgenhofer (Austria); Assistant referees: Alain Hoxha (Austria), Mario Strudl (Austria); Fourth official: Gerhard Grobelnik (Austria); Goal-line assistants: Bernhard Brugger (Austria), Oliver Drachta (Austria)

24 February 2011 Second leg	Twente (Netherlands)	2–2 (4–2 agg.)	(Russia) Rubin Kazan	Enschede, Netherlands
21:05 CET (UTC+1)	Janssen 45+1'; Douglas 47'; Brama (yellow card) 62'; Mihaylov (yellow card) 83'	Report	Ansaldi 22'; Noboa 24', (yellow card) 53'; Navas (yellow card) 38'; Karadeniz (yellow card) 59'; Ryzhikov (yellow card) 62'; Lebedenko (yellow card) 73'	Stadium: De Grolsch Veste; Attendance: 23,000; Referee: Marcin Borski (Poland); Assistant referees: Rafal Rostkowski (Poland), Paweł Sokolnicki (Poland); Fourth official: Daniel Stefański (Poland); Goal-line assistants: Dawid Piasecki (Poland), Marcin Szulc (Poland)
Note: Twente won 4–2 on aggregate.

===== Round of 16 =====
10 March 2011 First leg	Twente (Netherlands)	3–0	(Russia) Zenit Saint Petersburg	Enschede, Netherlands
21:05 CET (UTC+1)	L. de Jong 25', 90+2'; Landzaat 56'; Douglas (yellow card) 57'; Buysse (yellow card) 70'	Report	Alves (yellow card) 38'; Meira (yellow card) 55'	Stadium: De Grolsch Veste; Attendance: 20,750; Referee: Mark Clattenburg (England); Assistant referees: Stephen Child (England), Darren Cann (England); Fourth official: Lee Probert (England); Goal-line assistants: Anthony Taylor (England), Michael Oliver (England)

17 March 2011 Second leg	Zenit Saint Petersburg (Russia)	2–0 (2–3 agg.)	(Netherlands) Twente	Saint Petersburg, Russia
21:00 MSK (UTC+3)	Shirokov 16'; Danny (yellow card) 32'; Kerzhakov 38'; Alves (yellow card) 46'; Anyukov (yellow card) 58'	Report		Stadium: Petrovsky Stadium; Attendance: 18,000; Referee: Jonas Eriksson (Sweden); Assistant referees: Stefan Wittberg (Sweden), Mathias Klasenius (Sweden); Fourth official: Stefan Johannesson (Sweden); Goal-line assistants: Martin Strömbergsson (Sweden), Tobias Mattsson (Sweden)
Note: Twente won 3–2 on aggregate.

===== Quarter-finals =====
7 April 2011 First leg	Villarreal (Spain)	5–1	(Netherlands) Twente	Villarreal, Spain
21:05 CEST (UTC+2)	Marchena 23'; Valero 43'; Nilmar 45+1', 81'; Rossi 55'; Cazorla (yellow card) 84'	Report	Rosales (yellow card) 58'; Janko (yellow card) 70', (goal) 90+1'	Stadium: El Madrigal; Attendance: 19,094; Referee: Aleksei Nikolaev (Russia); Assistant referees: Nikolai Golubev (Russia), Anton Averianov (Russia); Fourth official: Vladislav Bezborodov (Russia); Goal-line assistants: Vladimir Pettay (Russia), Maksim Layushkin (Russia)

14 April 2011 Second leg	Twente (Netherlands)	1–3 (2–8 agg.)	(Spain) Villarreal	Enschede, Netherlands
21:05 CEST (UTC+2)	Bajrami 32'; Leugers (yellow card) 53'; Tiendalli (red card) 58'	Report	Catalá (yellow card) 39'; Rossi 60' (pen.); Ruben 84' (pen.); Cani 90'	Stadium: De Grolsch Veste; Attendance: 23,500; Referee: William Collum (Scotland); Assistant referees: George Drummond (Scotland), Graham Chambers (Scotland); Fourth official: Bobby Madden (Scotland); Goal-line assistants: Euan Norris (Scotland), Stephen O'Reilly (Scotland)
Note: Villarreal won 8–2 on aggregate.
