= Wout Brama =

Dutch footballer (born 1986)

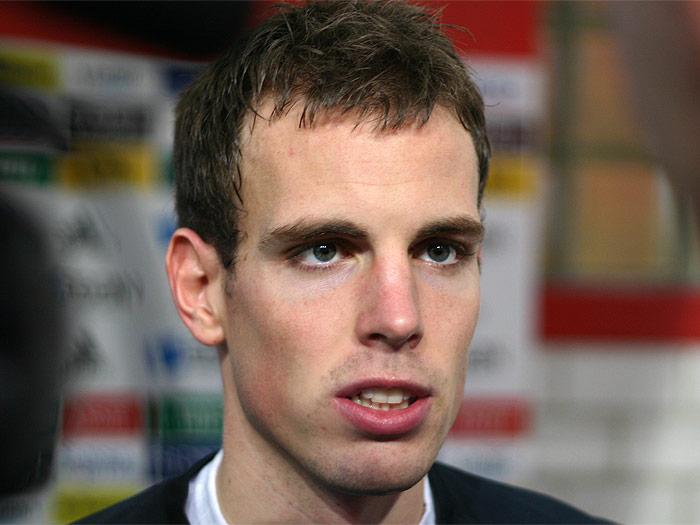
- Brama in 2010

Personal information
- Date of birth: 21 August 1986 (age 40)
- Place of birth: Almelo, Netherlands
- Height: 1.76 m (5 ft 9 in)
- Position: Defensive midfielder

Youth career
- 1990–1999: PH Almelo
- 1999–2005: Jong FC Twente

Senior career*
Years	Team	Apps	(Gls)
2005–2014	Twente	231	(6)
2014	Jong FC Twente	1	(0)
2014–2017	PEC Zwolle	59	(2)
2017	Utrecht	14	(0)
2017–2018	Central Coast Mariners	22	(2)
2018–2023	Twente	73	(3)
Total		400	(13)

International career
2005	Netherlands U19	1	(0)
2006–2009	Netherlands U21	11	(0)
2009–2010	Netherlands	3	(0)
- * Club domestic league appearances and goals

Wout Brama (Dutch pronunciation: [ʋʌud ˈbraːmaː]; born 21 August 1986) is a Dutch former professional footballer who played as a defensive midfielder.

== Club career ==
=== Twente ===
Born in Almelo, Brama began his youth team at PH Almelo before moving to FC Twente in 1999. After progressing through the Twente youth system, in which he was captain for both the youth team and the reserve team, he signed his first professional contract with the club in March 2005. Later that year, he was promoted to the first team.

Brama made his debut in the Eredivisie in the 2005–06 season for FC Twente, which came on as a second–half substitute, in a 2–0 loss against Roda JC in the opening game of the season. Since making his FC Twente debut, Brama quickly established himself in the first team at a midfield position. Despite being sidelined for five matches, Brama finished his first season in the 2005–06 season, making 38 appearances in all competitions.

The 2006–07 season saw Fred Rutten appointed as a new manager. Under Rutten, Brama found himself out of the first team, with Orlando Engelaar, Karim El Ahmadi and Otman Bakkal preferred in the starting eleven at midfield instead and played in the reserve side. Nevertheless, he extended his contract until 2008. He made his European debut on 15 July 2006 in a UEFA Intertoto Cup match, playing 90 minutes, in a 1–0 loss against Kalmar; ultimately winning 3–1 in the second leg. Throughout the 2006–07 season, Brama found himself in and out of the first team to fight for his first team place. He went on to make a total of 23 appearances in all competitions at the end of the season.

In the 2007–08 season, Brama started the first two league matches against Excelsior and Utrecht, starting in the right–back position. However, he soon lost it to Niels Wellenberg. Brama spent most of the season, coming on from the substitute bench. It wasn't until on 16 February 2008 when he set up one of the goals, in a 2–1 win over Roda JC. Then, on 23 March 2008, he come on as a late substitute and set up a winning goal for Eljero Elia, in a 2–1 win over Ajax. At the end of the 2007–08 season, Brama went on to make a total of 30 appearances in all competitions.

After Rutten and El Ahmadi left the club in the summer of 2008, Steve McClaren was appointed as the new manager. Under McClaren, Brama soon received more playing time in the first team in the 2008–09 season. Brama then made his UEFA Champions League debut in the play–offs round on 13 August 2008, starting the whole game, in a 2–0 loss against Arsenal; and also played again in the second leg, which saw them lose 4–0 He then started in every match since the opening game of the season against Roda JC, until he suffered a thigh injury in early November. After returning from injury, Brama regained his first team place and then set up a goal for Blaise Nkufo, who later scored a hat–trick, in a 6–0 win over Heracles Almelo on 22 November 2008. His performance resulted him signing a contract extension, keeping him until 2012, in February 2009. Towards the end of the season, Brama helped the side reach the final of the KNVB Cup. However, he didn't play in the final, as Twente went on to lose 5–4 in the penalty–shootout after playing in a 2–2 draw throughout the game. Despite this, Brama went on to make 47 appearances in all competitions in the 2008–09 season.

In the 2009–10 season, Brama started the season well when he helped the side making a good start to the season, resulting them at the top of the table. His performance was praised by McClaren as a result. Brama started in every match since the start of the season until he missed one game against Vitesse on 21 November 2009, due to suspension. After missing one game, he scored on his return on 28 November 2009, in a 3–1 win over Willem II. Brama then started every match since returning until his sending off once again during a 0–0 draw against Utrecht on 17 January 2010. For that, he was suspended for one game. After being suspended once again, Brama continued to remain in the first team and helped the club win the league for the first time after beating NAC Breda 2–0 in the last game of the season. At the end of the 2009–10 season, Brama went on to make a total of 45 appearances and scoring once in all competitions. He also finished third place behind Douglas and Bryan Ruiz for the club's player of the year voted by supporters.

In the 2010–11 season, Brama continued to feature in the first team following an arrival of Manager Michel Preud'homme. He started the season when he started and helped the side win 1–0 win over Ajax in the Johan Cruyff Shield. Brama then set up a goal for Marc Janko, in a 3–0 win over Vitesse to give them their first league win of the season. He then started every match since the opening game of the season until he suffered a hamstring injury in late–October. After returning to the first team as a second–half substitute in a 2–1 win over Excelsior on 6 November 2010, Brama regained his first team place and this resulted in him signing a three–year contract extension in January 2011. Shortly after signing a new contract, Brama scored his first goal of the season, in a 2–1 win over Feyenoord on 30 January 2011. He later scored his second goal of the season, in a 2–1 win over VVV-Venlo on 13 March 2011. Brama also scored a goal in the final of the KNVB Cup, in a 3–1 win over Ajax. After the match, Brama said of the game: "The previous final was a disappointment for me. Now I knew for sure that I would play. I did not think back about that final, but afterwards it's a nice revenge for me. Certainly that I also had a share in the victory." At the end of the 2010–11 season, Brama went on to make a total of 48 appearances and scoring three times in all competitions.

In the 2011–12 season, Brama was linked with a move away from the club, as Fulham was keen on signing him, having signed his teammate, Bryan Ruiz. Despite the move never happened, he remained at the club and switched his position to defensive–midfield. He also became the club's vice-captain for the new season. Brama started the season well when he helped the club once again beat Ajax 2–1 in the Johan Cruyff Shield. It wasn't until on 15 October 2011 when he scored his first goal for the club, in a 4–0 win over RKC Waalwijk. Five days later, on 20 October 2011, Brama scored again in a UEFA Europa League match, in a 4–1 win over OB. He then set up two goals for Peter Wisgerhof and Ola John, in a 4–0 thrashing victory over De Graafschap on 6 November 2011. Throughout the January transfer window, Brama continued to be linked with a move away, with SV Werder Bremen interested but eventually stayed at the club. His appearance against Steaua București in the second leg of the second round of UEFA Europa League with a 1–0 win overtake the record of Kick van der Vall and Kees van Ierssel for the most appearance in European football. The following month, Brama was given a captaincy for the first time on 15 March 2012, in a 4–1 loss against Schalke 04 in second leg of the last 16 that saw them eliminated in the UEFA Europa League. Brama later captained the side on three occasions later in the season. Despite missing two matches in all competitions for the 2011–12 season, Brama went on to make a total of 50 appearances and scoring two times. At the end of the 2011–12 season, Brama hinted about his departure from the club to seek new challenges.

In the 2012–13 season, Brama was given a captaincy at the start of the season in absence of Wisgerhof, who, himself, acknowledged about Brama's captaincy. He began to found himself in a competition with newly signing Robbert Schilder at the start of the season. After suffering ankle injury in late–August, Brama continued to regain his first team place throughout the season, as well as, captain. However, from beginning of February, he was soon plagued with suspensions (twice) and injuries. After returning from suspensions and injury, Brama scored on his first appearance from the sidelines, in a 1–1 draw against NAC Breda. But his return was short–lived when he suffered a heel bone injury in training that ended his season. At the end of the 2012–13 season, Brama went on to make a total of 39 appearances and scoring once in all competitions.

At the start of the 2013–14 season, Brama continued to recover from his heel bone injury. In his absence, Rasmus Bengtsson was given the captaincy for the 2013–14 season. In early–October, he began to operation on his heel bone. Brama continued to recover from his heel bone injury until he returned to training in February. After spending a year at the sidelines due to heel bone injury, Brama returned from the sidelines on 16 March 2014, appearing as an unused substitute, in a 2–1 win over AZ Alkmaar. In a follow-up match, Brama made his first appearance of the season on 30 March 2014, coming on as a second–half substitute, in a 3–0 loss to Ajax. He then scored his first goal of the season on 27 April 2014, in a 5–2 win over NEC. At the end of the 2013–14 season, Brama went on to make a total of 5 appearances and scoring once in all competitions.

With his contract expiring at the end of the 2013–14 season, Brama said about his future: " We had four weeks of vacation and I thought that was long enough. That is why it was allowed to start again for me. The match 'which club is the first to start', we seem to win every year. My focus is entirely on FC Twente, but as I know I have never made it a secret that when a nice club comes over I am open to it. But I will not leave FC Twente for the first club." Despite this, Brama remained at the club upon expiry of his contract. He then appeared in the club's pre–season tour throughout the summer of 2014. However, the club announced the following month that Brama would be leaving the club. Brama revealed his reasons of his departure, citing "talks and communications broken down."

By the time of his departure, Brama made his a total of 316 appearances and scoring 8 times in all competitions. Brama was given a farewell send-off following an end to a Twente match.

=== PEC Zwolle ===
Brama ended his stay at FC Twente for over 10 years when he joined PEC Zwolle on 16 October 2014, signing a one–year contract. It was reported that Brama played for free to keep up with his fitness.

Brama made his PEC Zwolle debut, where he came on as a second–half substitute, in a 3–2 loss against Go Ahead Eagles on 19 October 2014. He quickly fit in to the first team under the plans of Ron Jans, having impressed his teammates and coach. After being sidelined with injuries, Brama played against his former club, Twente, coming on as a second–half substitute, in a 2–1 loss on 23 November 2014. Initially not a first team regular at the club, Brama soon received more playing time as the season goes by. As a result, the club were keen on giving him a new contract. Amid to the contract talks, Brama scored his first goal for the club against his former club, FC Twente, in which he refused to celebrate, and the club went on to reach the semi–final of KNVB Cup after beating Twente 4–2 in the penalty–shootout. But he rejected a contract in March 2015, intending to leave the club to seek playing abroad. However, he suffered an Achilles tendon injury in mid–April and was sidelined for two weeks. Brama also missed out over in the Final of the KNVB Cup, where he was placed on the substitute bench, as PEC Zwolle lose 2–0 to Groningen. At the end of the 2014–15 season, Brama went on to make a total of 25 appearances and scoring once in all competitions.

Throughout the summer of 2015, Brama was a free agent after his contract negotiations with the club broken down again. Although he was linked a move back to Twente, Brama ultimately signed a two–year contract at PEC Zwolle at the end of August. He made his first appearance of the club, starting the whole game, in a 2–0 loss against Feyenoord on 27 September 2015. It wasn't until on 16 January 2016 when he scored his first goal for the club, as well as, setting up a goal, in a 5–2 win over SC Heerenveen. Brama then captained for the club for the first time on 16 April 2016, in a 5–1 loss against AZ Alkmaar. He then scored his second goal of the season, in a 5–2 loss against FC Utrecht in the second leg of the Play–Offs Round. Despite being sidelined from the first team on three occasions, Brama finished his full season at PEC Zwolle, making 28 appearances and scoring two times in all competitions.

In the 2016–17 season, Brama continued to regain his first team place at PEC Zwolle. He then scored his first goal of the season, in a 5–1 loss against Ajax on 24 September 2016. Despite suffering from a thigh injury, Brama continued to be in the first team for the side and made a total of 17 appearances and scoring once in the first half of the season.

=== Utrecht ===
On 27 December 2016, it was announced that Brama had signed a 1.5-year contract with FC Utrecht. The move was reported to have involved a transfer fee. Although he was happy with the move to FC Utrecht, he acknowledged about leaving the club when they were in a bad situation.

Brama made his FC Utrecht debut, starting the whole game, in a 2–1 win over Sparta Rotterdam on 14 January 2017. Since making his debut for the club, he quickly established himself in the midfield position. Brama also helped the side qualify for the UEFA Europa League after beating SC Heerenveen and FC Utrecht. Despite suffering ankle injury and suspension, Brama went on to make 19 appearances in all competitions later in the 2016–17 season.

In the 2017–18 season, Brama was featured twice in the UEFA Europa League matches. By the time of his departure, he made two appearances.

=== Central Coast Mariners ===
On 29 July 2017, Brama signed a two-year contract with Central Coast Mariners, moving abroad for the first time, joining his compatriot Tom Hiariej. Upon joining the club, Brama said of the move: " I have been playing in the Netherlands for a long time so I was immediately enthusiastic when I was approached by Central Coast Mariners. For me it's a big step, I spoke with Tom Hiariej and he was very positive about this club, it's nice to have another Dutchman there, which makes the beginning easier."

Brama made his Central Coast Mariners FC debut in the opening game of the season, starting the whole game, in a 5–1 loss against Newcastle Jets. He scored his first goal for the club in a 2–1 loss to Perth Glory on 22 October 2017. His second goal for the club then came on 16 November 2017, in a 2–1 loss against Adelaide United. Since making his Central Coast Mariners debut, Brama quickly established himself in the first team and played every match until his controversial sending off in a second–half for scraping Roly Bonevacia's calf, in a 2–0 loss against Western Sydney Wanderers on 16 November 2017.

=== Return to Twente ===
In the 2018–19 season, Brama returned to Twente, which had been relegated to the Eerste Divisie the previous season. Serving as captain, he played regularly and led the team to promotion back to the Eredivisie. During the 2019–20 Eredivisie season, Brama remained captain of Twente. After the winter break, he was excluded from the squad following a conflict with the club's management. However, a group of supporters defended Brama, viewing him as a club icon.

In both 2020 and 2021, Brama extended his contract with the club for an additional year. On April 9, 2023, he marked a milestone by playing his 300th Eredivisie match for Twente. A month later, Brama announced through the club website that he would retire from professional football at the end of the 2022–23 season, citing the club's decision to assign him a more marginal role for the upcoming season as a key factor. His last professional appearance came on June 11, 2023, during a play-off match for European football against Sparta Rotterdam which ended in a 1–0 victory.

== International career ==
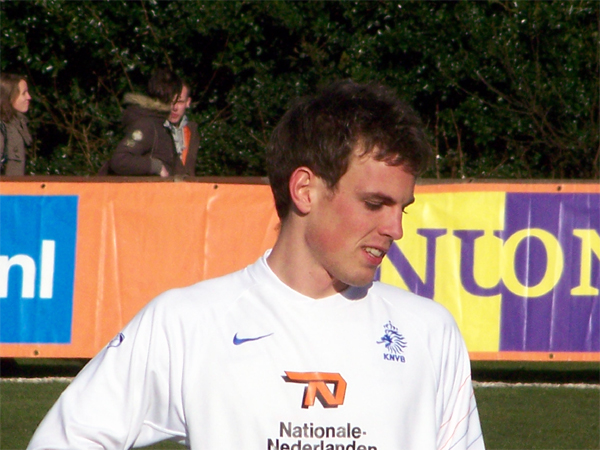
Brama training for the national side in 2008.

Brama represented Netherlands youth side, such as, Netherlands U18, Netherlands U19 and Netherlands U20 He was also called up by the squad since August 2005 for the Olympics qualification campaign.

In August 2006, Brama was called up to the Netherlands U21 squad. He made his Netherlands U21 debut on 15 August 2006, coming on as a second–half substitute, in a 2–2 draw against Germany U21. Brama went on to make 10 international caps for the Netherlands U21 side.

In November 2008, he was called up to the Netherlands B team following its reinstatement for the first time in 20 years. He started and played 45 minutes before being substituted on 19 November 2008, which saw Netherlands B team lose 3–0 against Sweden U21. Four months later, Brama made another Netherlands B appearance on 27 March 2009, started and played 45 minutes before being substituted, in a 4–0 win over Germany U21.

In November 2009, Brama was called up to the Netherlands squad for the first time. Brama made his debut for the Netherlands on 18 November 2009 friendly match against Paraguay, in a 0–0 draw. The day after Twente won the league for the first time, Brama, along with teammate Sander Boschker, were included in the provisional squad of 30 players for the 2010 FIFA World Cup. However, Brama was cut from the national team following a decision to cut the provisional squad to 27, and eventually 23. Brama went on to earn a total of 3 caps, scoring no goals. His final international was on 12 October 2010 Euro qualification match against Sweden. After this, Brama was called up by the national team on number of occasions but never played for the side again.

== Personal life ==
Brama has three brothers: Thijs, Joost and Bart. In December 2006, Brama, along with Sander Boschker, were involved in an accident, but Brama escaped unhurt, though Boschker was hurt.

In addition to speaking Dutch, Brama speaks English. Brama resided in Enschede during his time at FC Twente and continued living there following his departure in 2014. Brama also said that he's considering taking up a technical manager when he retires.

== Career statistics ==
=== Club ===
As of match played 11 June 2023

Appearances and goals by club, season and competition
Club	Season	League			Cup (Note: All appearances in the KNVB Cup)		Continental		Other		Total	
Club	Season	Division	Apps	Goals	Apps	Goals	Apps	Goals	Apps	Goals	Apps	Goals
Twente	2005–06	Eredivisie	29	0	0	0	–		6 (Note: Appearance(s) in the Eredivisie European playoffs)	0	35	0
Twente	2006–07	Eredivisie	19	0	0	0	4 (Note: Two appearances in UEFA Intertoto Cup, two appearances in UEFA Cup)	0	0	0	23	0
Twente	2007–08	Eredivisie	26	0	1	0	2 (Note: Appearances in the UEFA Cup/UEFA Europa League)	0	1	0	30	0
Twente	2008–09	Eredivisie	32	0	5	0	10 (Note: Two appearances in UEFA Champions League, eight appearances in UEFA Cup)	0	–		47	0
Twente	2009–10	Eredivisie	31	1	3	0	12 (Note: Two appearances in Champions League, ten appearances in Europa League)	0	–		46	1
Twente	2010–11	Eredivisie	31	2	5	1	11 (Note: Five appearances in Champions League, six appearances in Europa League)	0	1 (Note: Appearance in Johan Cruyff Shield)	0	48	3
Twente	2011–12	Eredivisie	33	1	1	0	13 (Note: Four appearances in Champions League, nine appearances and one goal in Europa League)	1	3 (Note: One appearance in the Cruyff Shield, two appearances in the Eredivisie European playoffs)	0	50	2
Twente	2012–13	Eredivisie	25	1	0	0	14	0	0	0	39	1
Twente	2013–14	Eredivisie	5	1	0	0	–		–		5	1
Twente	Total		231	6	15	1	66	1	11	0	323	8
Jong FC Twente	2013–14	Eerste Divisie	1	0	–		–		–		1	0
PEC Zwolle	2014–15	Eredivisie	20	0	3	1	0	0	2	0	25	1
PEC Zwolle	2015–16	Eredivisie	25	1	1	0	–		2	1	28	2
PEC Zwolle	2016–17	Eredivisie	14	1	3	0	–		–		17	1
PEC Zwolle	Total		59	2	7	1	0	0	4	1	70	4
Utrecht	2016–17	Eredivisie	14	0	1	0	–		4	0	19	0
Utrecht	2017–18	Eredivisie	0	0	0	0	2	0	0	0	2	0
Utrecht	Total		14	0	1	0	2	0	4	0	21	0
Central Coast Mariners	2017–18	A-League	22	2	0	0	–		–		22	2
Twente	2018–19	Eerste Divisie	24	2	3	0	–		–		27	2
Twente	2019–20	Eredivisie	9	0	2	0	–		–		11	0
Twente	2020–21	Eredivisie	20	1	1	0	–		–		21	1
Twente	2021–22	Eredivisie	9	0	0	0	–		–		9	0
Twente	2022–23	Eredivisie	11	0	1	0	0	0	2 (Note: Appearances in the Eredivisie European playoffs)	0	14	0
Twente	Total		73	3	7	0	0	0	2	0	82	3
Career total			400	13	30	2	68	1	21	1	519	17

=== International ===
Appearances and goals by national team and year
National team	Year	Apps	Goals
Netherlands	2009	1	0
Netherlands	2010	2	0
Total		3	0

== Honours ==
FC Twente

- Eredivisie: 2009–10
- Eerste Divisie: 2018–19
- KNVB Cup: 2010–11
- Johan Cruijff Schaal: 2010, 2011
