= 2009 KNVB Cup final =

- Event: 2008–09 KNVB Cup
Heerenveen	FC Twente
2	2
- After extra time Heerenveen won 5–4 on penalties
- Date: 17 May 2009
- Venue: De Kuip, Rotterdam
- Referee: Jan Wegereef
- Attendance: 45,000

The 2009 KNVB Cup final was a football match between Heerenveen and FC Twente on 17 May 2009 at De Kuip, Rotterdam. It was the final match of the 2008–09 KNVB Cup competition. Heerenveen beat FC Twente on penalties after the match finished 2–2 after extra time. It was the side's first KNVB Cup trophy.

== Route to the final ==
Heerenveen		Round	FC Twente	
Opponent	Result		Opponent	Result
MVV	3–0 (A)	Second round	FC Emmen	5–0 (A)
Haaglandia	7–0 (H)	Third round	FC Eindhoven	3–2 (A)
Feyenoord	3–0 (A)	Round of 16	ADO Den Haag	5–1 (A)
NEC	3–1 (H)	Quarter-finals	De Graafschap	1–0 (a.e.t.) (H)
FC Volendam	2–0 (A)	Semi-finals	NAC Breda	3–1 (H)

== Match ==
=== Details ===
17 May 2009
18:00 CEST

Heerenveen	2–2 (a.e.t.)	FC Twente
Popov 27'; Kalou 112'	Report	Elia 54'; Hersi 118'
Penalties
Elm (penalty scored); Dingsdag (penalty scored); Breuer (penalty scored); Kalou (penalty scored); Sibon (penalty scored)	5–4	(penalty scored) Janssen; (penalty scored) Nkufo; (penalty missed) Hersi; (penalty scored) Braafheid; (penalty scored) Douglas

De Kuip, Rotterdam
Attendance: 45,000
Referee: Jan Wegereef

Heerenveen	FC Twente

GK	24	(South Africa) Hans Vonk
RB	4	(Netherlands) Michel Breuer (c)
CB	3	(Denmark) Kristian Bak Nielsen
CB	5	(Netherlands) Michael Dingsdag
LB	20	(North Macedonia) Goran Popov	(yellow card) 45'
CM	17	(Norway) Christian Grindheim		(substituted off) 74'
CM	15	(Czech Republic) Michal Švec	(yellow card) 20'	(substituted off) 78'
CM	7	(Sweden) Viktor Elm
RW	8	(Netherlands) Roy Beerens		(substituted off) 87'
CF	35	(Netherlands) Gerald Sibon	(yellow card) 42'
LW	10	(Croatia) Danijel Pranjić
Substitutes:
GK	25	(Belgium) Brian Vandenbussche
DF	16	(Netherlands) Calvin Jong-a-Pin
MF	9	(Netherlands) Geert Arend Roorda	(yellow card) 90'	(substituted on) 78'
MF	21	(Ivory Coast) Bonaventure Kalou		(substituted on) 74'
MF	31	(Iceland) Arnór Smárason
FW	12	(Brazil) Paulo Henrique		(substituted on) 87'
FW	14	(Sweden) Patrik Ingelsten
Manager:
(Norway) Trond Sollied

GK	1	(Netherlands) Sander Boschker
RB	19	(Brazil) Douglas
CB	4	(Netherlands) Peter Wisgerhof		(substituted off) 17'
CB	5	(Serbia) Slobodan Rajković
LB	3	(Netherlands) Edson Braafheid
CM	18	(Ivory Coast) Cheick Tioté
CM	24	(Netherlands) Theo Janssen	(yellow card) 52'
AM	10	(Denmark) Kenneth Perez		(substituted off) 84'
RW	21	(Austria) Marko Arnautović		(substituted off) 12'
CF	9	(Switzerland) Blaise Nkufo (c)
LW	15	(Netherlands) Eljero Elia	(yellow card) 104'
Substitutes:
GK	13	(Bulgaria) Nikolay Mihaylov
DF	8	(Netherlands) Ronnie Stam		(substituted on) 17'
DF	12	(Netherlands) Jeroen Heubach
DF	22	(Netherlands) Niels Wellenberg
MF	17	(Netherlands) Youssouf Hersi		(substituted on) 84'
MF	58	(Netherlands) Alexander Bannink
FW	7	(Netherlands) Romano Denneboom		(substituted on) 12'
Manager:
(England) Steve McClaren

Match rules

- 90 minutes.
- 30 minutes of extra-time if necessary.
- Penalty shoot-out if scores still level.
- Maximum of three substitutions.
