= 2011 Johan Cruyff Shield =

Johan Cruijff Schaal XVI
FC Twente	Ajax
2	1
- Date: 30 July 2011
- Venue: Amsterdam Arena, Amsterdam
- Referee: Pol van Boekel
- Attendance: 45,000

The sixteenth edition of the Johan Cruyff Shield (Dutch: Johan Cruijff Schaal) was held on 30 July 2011 at the Amsterdam Arena. The match was played between 2010–11 KNVB Cup winners FC Twente and 2010–11 Eredivisie champions Ajax. FC Twente won 2–1 in front of 45,000 spectators.

== Match details ==
30 July 2011

FC Twente	2–1	Ajax
Janko 21' (pen.); Ruiz 68'	Report	Alderweireld 54'

Amsterdam Arena, Amsterdam
Attendance: 45,000
Referee: Pol van Boekel

FC Twente	Ajax

GK	13	(Bulgaria) Nikolay Mihaylov
RB	2	(Netherlands) Tim Cornelisse	(yellow card) 71'
CB	4	(Netherlands) Peter Wisgerhof (c)
CB	19	(Brazil) Douglas	(yellow card) 75'
LB	20	(Netherlands) Dwight Tiendalli
CM	6	(Netherlands) Wout Brama
CM	14	(Netherlands) Willem Janssen
AM	9	(Netherlands) Luuk de Jong
RW	12	(Netherlands) Steven Berghuis	(yellow card) 42' (yellow-red card) 47'
CF	21	(Austria) Marc Janko		(substituted off) 52'
LW	24	(Netherlands) Ola John		(substituted off) 46'
Substitutes:
GK	1	(Netherlands) Sander Boschker
DF	5	(Sweden) Rasmus Bengtsson
DF	23	(Belgium) Bart Buysse
MF	18	(Germany) Thilo Leugers		(substituted on) 52'
MF	42	(Germany) Theo Vogelsang
FW	10	(Costa Rica) Bryan Ruiz		(substituted on) 46'
FW	17	(Slovakia) Andrej Rendla
Manager:
(Netherlands) Co Adriaanse

GK	12	(Netherlands) Kenneth Vermeer
RB	2	(Netherlands) Gregory van der Wiel		(substituted off) 76'
CB	3	(Belgium) Toby Alderweireld
CB	17	(Netherlands) Daley Blind
LB	15	(Denmark) Nicolai Boilesen		(substituted off) 63'
CM	8	(Denmark) Christian Eriksen
CM	10	(Netherlands) Siem de Jong
CM	16	(Netherlands) Theo Janssen (c)	(yellow card) 21'
RW	7	(Serbia) Miralem Sulejmani
CF	9	(Iceland) Kolbeinn Sigþórsson		(substituted off) 66'
LW	11	(Netherlands) Lorenzo Ebecilio	(yellow card) 90+1'
Substitutes:
GK	30	(Netherlands) Jeroen Verhoeven
DF	13	(Netherlands) André Ooijer		(substituted on) 63'
MF	5	(Netherlands) Vurnon Anita		(substituted on) 76'
MF	6	(Cameroon) Eyong Enoh
MF	25	(South Africa) Thulani Serero
MF	31	(Netherlands) Rodney Sneijder
FW	21	(Netherlands) Derk Boerrigter		(substituted on) 66'
Manager:
(Netherlands) Frank de Boer
