= Andrej Rendla =

Slovak footballer

Personal information
- Full name: Andrej Rendla
- Date of birth: 13 October 1990 (age 36)
- Place of birth: Banská Bystrica, Slovakia
- Height: 1.88 m (6 ft 2 in)
- Position: Forward

Youth career
- Dukla Banská Bystrica

Senior career*
Years	Team	Apps	(Gls)
2006–2007	Dukla Banská Bystrica	21	(1)
2007–2015	Twente Enschede	5	(0)
2010–2011	→ Heracles Almelo (loan)	10	(0)
2015–2017	Železiarne Podbrezová	32	(7)
- * Club domestic league appearances and goals

Andrej Rendla (born 13 October 1990) is a retired Slovak footballer who played as a forward.

== Career ==
=== Early career ===
Rendla debuted in professional football one day after his 16th birthday for Dukla Banská Bystrica. Because of the low age he had, he was the youngest player to debut in the Slovak Superliga ever. In 21 league matches, he scored 1 goal, and he soon attracted attention by FC Twente. In the summer of 2007, Rendla signed a youth contract with Twente.

=== FC Twente ===
Rendla's year in FC Twente's youth was very successful with many wins, including a Youth Super Cup victory, where Rendla scored 2 goals in the final against De Graafschap's youth team. On 25 November 2007, Rendla made his debut in the Dutch league, being a substitute for Stein Huysegems in the away match against Sparta Rotterdam. He came into the pitch in the 68th minute.

In January 2008, he suffered a knee ligament injury, which sidelined him until the end of the year. In the 2009–10 pre-season, he was back in FC Twente's squad.

== Honours ==
=== Club ===
FC Twente

- Eredivisie: 2009–10
- Johan Cruijff Schaal: 2011
