= Dwight Tiendalli =

Dutch footballer (born 1985)

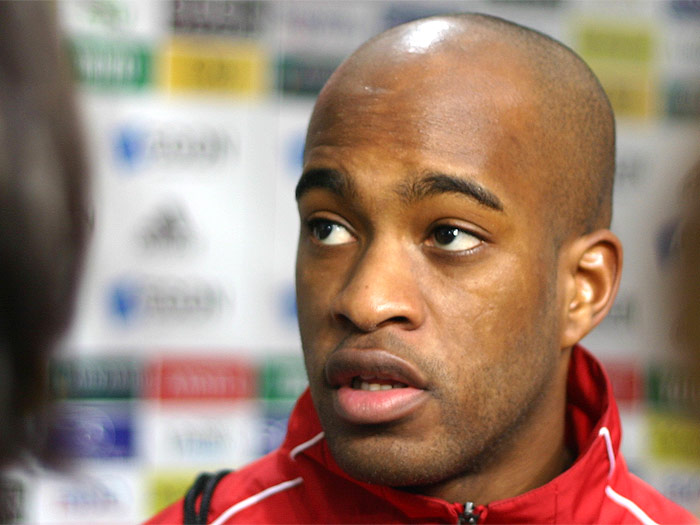
- Tiendalli at FC Twente in 2010

Personal information
- Full name: Dwight Marciano Tiendalli
- Date of birth: 21 October 1985 (age 41)
- Place of birth: Paramaribo, Suriname
- Height: 1.80 m (5 ft 11 in)
- Position: Full-back

Youth career
- 2001–2004: Ajax
- 2004–2005: Utrecht

Senior career*
| Years | Team | Apps | (Gls) |
| 2005–2006 | Utrecht | 41 | (3) |
| 2006–2009 | Feyenoord | 35 | (0) |
| 2008 | → Sparta Rotterdam (loan) | 13 | (0) |
| 2009–2012 | Twente | 71 | (1) |
| 2012–2015 | Swansea City | 27 | (1) |
| 2015 | → Middlesbrough (loan) | 2 | (0) |
| 2017–2018 | Oxford United | 13 | (0) |
| Total | | 202 | (5) |

International career
| 2005–2007 | Netherlands U21 | 16 | (0) |
| 2013 | Netherlands | 2 | (0) |
Medal record
Men's football
Representing Netherlands
UEFA European Under-21 Championship
| Winner | 2006 |
- * Club domestic league appearances and goals

Dwight Marciano Tiendalli (born 21 October 1985) is a former professional footballer who played as a full-back.

Tiendalli is a former Dutch under-21 international, and was part of the FC Twente team that won the 2009–10 Eredivisie. After his first season with Swansea City, in which the team won the League Cup, Tiendalli was capped twice by the Netherlands national team.

== Club career ==
=== FC Utrecht ===
Born in Paramaribo, Suriname, Tiendalli moved to the Netherlands at a young age. He began his football career at Ajax and spent eleven years there before joining Utrecht in 2004.

After progressing through the ranks at the club, Tiendalli was called up to the first team for the first time in December 2004. He made his debut as a 75th-minute substitute in a 1–0 win over Den Bosch on 19 December 2004. Tiendalli found himself in and out of the starting line-up, also playing in the reserve team. Tiendalli scored his first senior goal for FC Utrecht, having come on as a 73rd-minute substitute, in a 1–0 win against RBC Roosendaal on 12 February 2005. By the end of the 2004–05 season, he had made eleven appearances and scored once in all competitions. Following this, the club began talks over a new contract.

In the 2005–06 season, Tiendalli appeared more often for FC Utrecht, featuring in the first seven league matches, until he was sent off for a professional foul in the 65th minute of a 3–1 win against Feyenoord on 2 October 2005. After serving a one-match suspension, he returned to the starting line-up against SC Heerenveen on 23 October 2005, as the club drew 1–1. On 27 November he scored his first goal of the season, in a 1–0 win against Ajax. His second goal of the season came in a 3–2 victory over ADO Den Haag on 15 January 2006. Despite being sidelined during the 2005–06 season, Tiendalli continued to remain involved in the first team, making twenty-nine appearances, scoring twice, in all competitions.

Ahead of the 2006–07 season, Tiendalli was linked to a move away from Utrecht, with Feyenoord and Real Betis interested in signing him. Amid the transfer speculation, he made one further appearance for Utrecht in the opening game of the season, a 2–1 defeat to Willem II.

=== Feyenoord ===
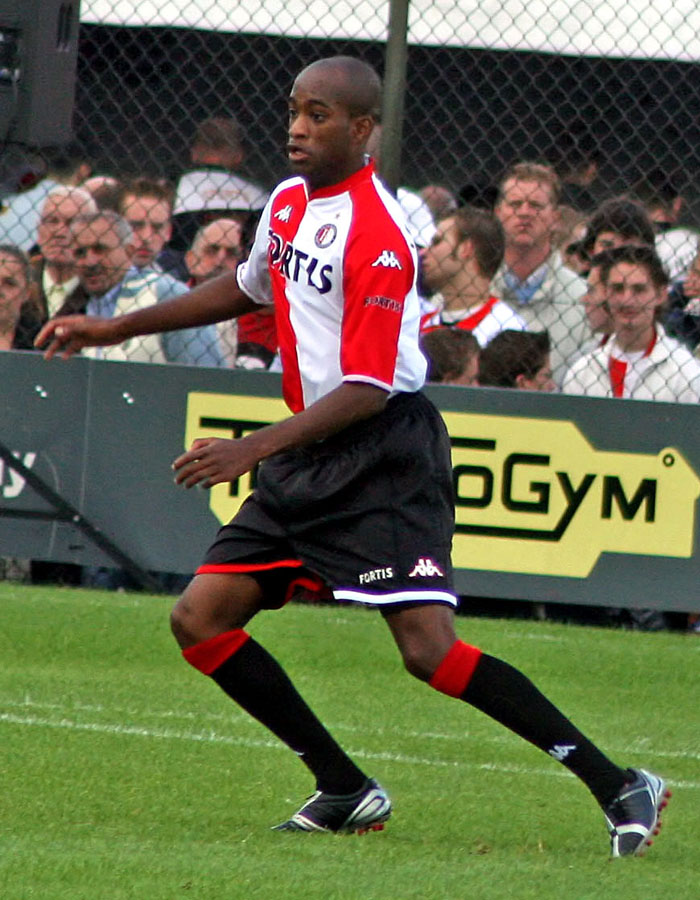
Tiendalli running for the defence during the match.

In the summer of 2006, Tiendalli moved to Feyenoord on a four-year contract, for a fee of €2 million.

He made his debut five days later on 27 August 2006, in the starting eleven in a 0–0 draw against Heracles Almelo. In his second appearance against Sparta Rotterdam on 10 September 2016, he suffered a hamstring injury and was substituted in the 68th minute, as the club won 4–1. However, he recovered quickly and made his European debut as a starter in the first round of the UEFA Cup, a 2–2 draw against Lokomotiv Sofia. The club reached the Group Stage after drawing 0–0, going through on away goals. In a match against Willem II on 12 November 2006, he was sent off after handling the ball on the goal-line in the 78th minute, as Feyenoord won 5–3. Following the match, however, video evidence showed that Tiendalli had not committed an offence; referee Jack van Hulten admitted his mistake and the red card was rescinded. He became a first-team regular for Feyenoord in the first half of the season, but was later sidelined with injuries, including a groin injury meaning he was expected to miss the entire season. By March, he was sufficiently recovered to resume training, and returned to the starting line-up on 22 April 2007 in a 1–1 draw with NEC Nijmegen. In his first season at Feyenoord, Tiendalli made nineteen appearances in all competitions.

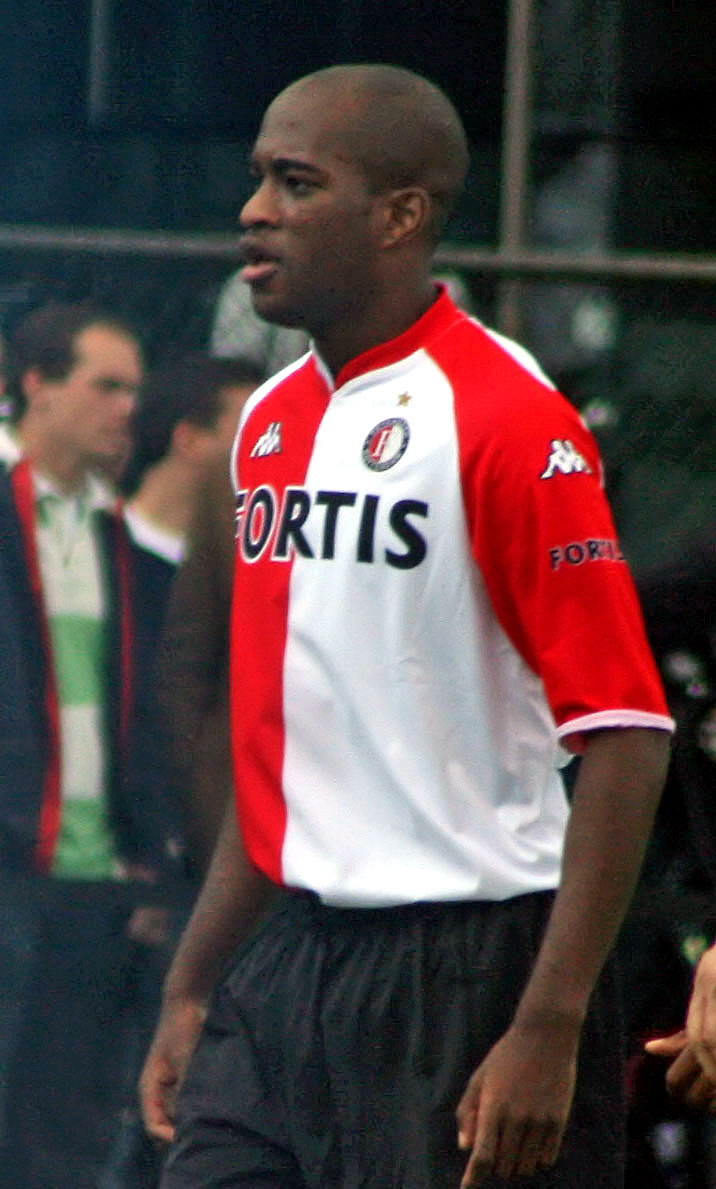
Tiendalli in the Feyenoord home shirt in 2007.

Tiendalli's return was short-lived as he fractured his lower leg, which kept him out for the rest of the year. On recovering from his injury, he was told by Feyenoord that he would be loaned out. Feyenoord loaned Tiendalli to city rivals Sparta Rotterdam on 25 January 2008, where he was re-united with his former Utrecht coach Foeke Booy. Tiendalli made his debut for Sparta Rotterdam on 26 January 2008 as a member of the starting line-up, setting up the second goal in a 2–1 win over FC Twente. He became a first-team regular, helping them avoid relegation and making thirteen appearances in all competitions.

After his loan spell ended, Tiendalli was told by Feyenoord that he could leave the club despite his being keen to stay and take his chance. Tiendalli ended up staying at Feyenoord over the summer, because of the club's asking price. At the start of the 2008–09 season, he found himself playing for the reserve side. A month later, on 26 October 2008, Tiendalli made his first senior appearance of the season, in a 2–2 draw with SC Heerenveen. Following his return to the first team, he was involved more often by the club, until he was sent off for a second bookable offence in a 2–0 defeat in De Klassieker, Feyenoord's highly contested match with Ajax, on 15 February 2009. Following his return, Tiendalli failed to make his hoped-for breakthrough into regular first-team contention. He was sent off again in the last game of the season, a 3–2 defeat to Roda JC, for a professional foul in the 19th minute. Despite injuries and suspensions, he made twenty-eight appearances in all competitions during the 2008–09 season.

At the start of the 2009–10 season, Tiendalli suffered a shoulder injury while playing for the club's reserve side and the club announced on 31 August 2009 that his contract would be terminated.

=== Twente ===
On 14 September 2009, Tiendalli signed a one-year contract with FC Twente – on a free transfer – with a view to a further year, following a trial.

A month after joining Twente, having appeared as an unused substitute in the previous two matches, Tiendalli made his debut as a substitute for Dario Vujičević in the 63rd minute of a 3–1 win over Heracles Almelo. A week after his debut, he scored his first goal and provided an assist for Miroslav Stoch's opener in a 4–0 win over FC Groningen. Having established himself in the first team, he competed with Slobodan Rajković and Nicky Kuiper in the defence, though he also played in other positions. Tiendalli helped Twente keep four consecutive clean sheets between 17 January 2010 and 3 February 2010. Having missed out on the club's earlier matches in Europe, Tiendalli made his Europa League debut, playing in both legs against Werder Bremen in which Twente lost 4–2, resulting in their elimination in the second round. A month later, on 16 March 2010, he signed a one-year contract extension with Twente. Tiendalli later helped the club to their first-ever Eredivisie title. By the end of the 2009–10 season, he had made thirty-two appearances, scoring once, in all competitions.

At the start of the 2010–11 season, Tiendalli started in the Johan Cruyff Shield match against Ajax and helped Twente win 1–0. He was then involved in four consecutive clean sheets in the first four league matches of the season. He made his UEFA Champions League debut against Inter Milan on 14 September 2010, in the starting eleven, as FC Twente drew 2–2. He went on to make two more appearances in the Champions League, but Twente finished in third place in the group stage, relegating the club to the UEFA Europa League. The club advanced through the knockout stage to the quarter-final, in the first leg of which Tiendalli received a straight red card in a 3–1 loss against Villarreal. Twente ultimately lost the two-legged tie 8–2 on aggregate. In the 2010–11 season, he lost his first-team place because of injuries and competition from other players. Tiendalli finished the season having made twenty-eight appearances in all competitions. At the end of the season, it was announced that his contract would not be renewed after talks stalled. A week before his contract expiry, he attended the club's first session of the new season, insisting it was to maintain his fitness. However, Michel Preud'homme's successor as manager, Co Adriaanse, offered him a new one-year contract, which Tiendalli accepted. After signing the deal, Tiendalli stated that he hoped to make a fresh start under Adriaanse.

In the 2011–12 season, Tiendalli started for Twente as they faced Ajax for the second time in a row for the Johan Cruyff Shield and went on to win 2–1. He played in three matches in Twente's UEFA Champions League Qualification Round, until the club were eliminated in the play-offs following a 5–3 loss on aggregate against Benfica. From the start of the 2011–12 season, Tiendalli found himself in competing for his first-team place at left back. In the UEFA Europa League match against OB, he set up the club's second goal of the game, a 3–2 win leading to qualification for the knockout stage of the tournament. Tiendalli suffered an ankle injury during a 4–1 victory over Groningen on 29 January 2012 and was substituted in the 7th minute. He did not return to the first team until 4 March 2012 when he came on as a late substitute in a 6–2 win over PSV Eindhoven. He continued to face competition for the left-back position under new manager Steve McClaren. He finished the 2011–12 season having appeared forty-one times in all competitions. It was announced on 1 April 2012 that Tiendalli would be leaving the club at the end of the season.

=== Swansea City ===
On 10 September 2012, Premier League club Swansea City confirmed that Tiendalli had signed a deal until the end of the 2012–13 season. He was signed as cover for first-choice left back Neil Taylor, who was ruled out for the remainder of 2012–13 season with a broken ankle.

Tiendalli made his Swansea City debut in the third round of the League Cup, providing an assist for Danny Graham in a 3–2 win over Crawley Town. Having been on the bench in the league for two months since joining, as a result of Ben Davies and Àngel Rangel being first choice in the left and right back position respectively (Tiendalli played in both positions), he finally made his league debut on 1 December 2012 against Arsenal, coming on as a substitute for Jonathan de Guzmán in the 74th minute of a 2–0 win. After the match, Tiendalli stated his intent to stay at Swansea despite his lack of first-team opportunities. From December, he became the club's first choice right-back after Rangel was injured, as well as being rotated in different positions. Tiendalli appeared in the final of the League Cup when he came on for Davies in the 84th minute of a 5–0 win over Bradford City, Swansea becoming the first non-English Premier League team to win the League Cup and the first since 1927 to win a major English cup (Swansea's rivals Cardiff City won the FA Cup in 1927). Manager Michael Laudrup praised Tiendalli for his performance in response to uncertainty over his future. Laudrup, however, said he expected Tiendalli to move on at the end of the season. Tiendalli scored his first goal for the club in a 3–2 away win over Wigan Athletic on 7 May 2013 at the DW Stadium. In his first season at Swansea City, he made twenty-one appearances and scored once in all competitions. At the end of the 2012–13 season, Tiendalli's agent Sebastien Casenaz told Talksport that he would not be at Swansea the following season after contract talks had broken down.

On 28 August 2013, however, Tiendalli re-joined Swansea City on a three-year contract lasting until June 2016. His first game after signing for the club in his second spell came on 19 September 2013 against Valencia in the UEFA Europa League, a 3–0 victory. However, his first-team opportunities at Swansea City were limited once again, due to competition with other defenders. He made six starts in league matches during December in the absence of Rangel. Tiendalli set up Swansea City's goal in a 2–1 defeat to Everton on 22 December 2013. However, once again he was placed down the pecking order, as well as facing injury concerns. After three months away from the first team, he started a match and played 77 minutes before being substituted in a 1–0 defeat to Southampton on 3 May 2014. By the end of the 2013–14 season, Tiendalli had appeared nineteen times in all competitions.

Tiendalli appeared in the first three matches of the 2014–15 season, but again found himself down the pecking order. After not playing for five months, Tiendalli returned to the starting line-up against Tranmere Rovers in the third round of the FA Cup, Swansea winning 6–2. He made two more appearances for the club later in January.

==== Middlesbrough (loan) ====
On 26 March 2015, Tiendalli was loaned out to promotion-chasing Middlesbrough of the Championship for the remainder of the 2014–15 season. He made his Boro debut away to Watford on 6 April 2015, starting in a 2–0 loss. He sat out the next four matches for the club and did not make an appearance until the last game of the season, a 0–0 draw with Brighton & Hove Albion. These were his only two appearances for Middlesbrough. Middlesbrough elected to terminate his loan deal, allowing him to return to his parent club.

He was deemed by Swansea City to be surplus to requirements, and on 1 September 2015 the club announced that his contract had been cancelled by mutual consent.

=== Oxford United ===
In July 2017, having been without a club for nearly two years, Tiendalli signed a one-year contract with Oxford United of League One. Trials with Leicester City and Birmingham City were unsuccessful because of concerns over injuries.

Tiendalli's start to his Oxford United career was affected by fitness concerns. He made his debut for the club on 29 August 2017, starting in a 6–2 win over Stevenage in an EFL Trophy match. In the 28th minute of a 1–1 draw against Milton Keynes Dons on 2 September 2017, Tiendalli suffered a hamstring injury and was substituted. Following surgery, he was sidelined for a month. He returned to the starting line-up on 28 October 2017, in a 2–0 defeat to Fleetwood Town. The next two months saw him establish himself in the starting eleven, playing in the right-back position. He also contributed two assists, both goals scored by James Henry. Tiendalli was released at the end of the 2017–18 season having played in 13 league fixtures, none of them under new manager Karl Robinson.

== Retirement ==
On 22 September 2018, Tiendalli announced his decision to retire from football, and begin working as a Football Family Office agent.

== International career ==
=== Youth career ===
Having previously represented Netherlands and Netherlands U19, Tiendalli was called up to the Netherlands U20 for the first time in August 2004. He was featured in a number of matches at the beginning of 2005. In May 2005, Tiendalli was called up to the under-20 squad for the FIFA World Youth Championship in Netherlands. He played five matches in the final stages for the Netherlands national U-21 team, as they were eliminated in the quarter-finals.

Tiendalli made his Netherlands U21 debut on 17 August 2005 against Belgium U21, as they won 2–1. He then featured in a number of matches for the U21 side. In May 2006, Tiendalli was called up to the Netherlands U21 squad for the UEFA European Under-21 Championship in Portugal. His team won the competition and he was named in the UEFA Team of the Tournament. However, Tiendalli was dropped out for the following UEFA European Under-21 Championship.

=== Senior career ===
In May 2013, Tiendalli was called up to the senior team for the first time. He made his full international debut in a 3–0 friendly win against Indonesia on 7 June 2013, replacing Daryl Janmaat in the second half. His first starting appearance, and his only other senior appearance, was against China four days later.

== Personal life ==
Tiendalli is married and has three children. Tiendalli lived in Oxford, England, and his children attended school in England, while he travelled to Netherlands for his business.

Tiendalli's brother, Wesley Tiendalli, works alongside him as an agent.

== Career statistics ==
=== Club ===
Appearances and goals by club, season and competition
| Club | Season | League | | | National Cup | | League Cup | | Europe | | Other | | Total | |
| Club | Season | Division | Apps | Goals | Apps | Goals | Apps | Goals | Apps | Goals | Apps | Goals | Apps | Goals |
|---|---|---|---|---|---|---|---|---|---|---|---|---|---|---|
| Utrecht | 2004–05 | Eredivisie | 11 | 1 | 1 | 0 | – | | 0 | 0 | 0 | 0 | 12 | 1 |
| Utrecht | 2005–06 | Eredivisie | 29 | 2 | 3 | 2 | – | | – | | 2 | 0 | 34 | 4 |
| Utrecht | 2006–07 | Eredivisie | 1 | 0 | 0 | 0 | – | | – | | 0 | 0 | 1 | 0 |
| Utrecht | Total | | 41 | 3 | 4 | 2 | – | | 0 | 0 | 2 | 0 | 47 | 5 |
| Feyenoord | 2006–07 | Eredivisie | 13 | 0 | 2 | 0 | – | | 3 | 0 | 1 | 0 | 19 | 0 |
| Feyenoord | 2007–08 | Eredivisie | 0 | 0 | 0 | 0 | – | | – | | – | | 0 | 0 |
| Feyenoord | 2008–09 | Eredivisie | 22 | 0 | 2 | 0 | – | | 3 (Note: Appearances in UEFA Europa League) | 0 | 1 | 0 | 28 | 0 |
| Feyenoord | Total | | 35 | 0 | 4 | 0 | – | | 6 | 0 | 2 | 0 | 47 | 0 |
| Sparta Rotterdam (loan) | 2007–08 | Eredivisie | 13 | 0 | 0 | 0 | – | | – | | – | | 13 | 0 |
| Twente | 2009–10 | Eredivisie | 26 | 1 | 5 | 0 | – | | 2 | 0 | – | | 33 | 1 |
| Twente | 2010–11 | Eredivisie | 18 | 0 | 4 | 0 | – | | 5 (Note: Two appearances in UEFA Europa League and three in UEFA Champions League) | 0 | 1 (Note: Appearance in Johan Cruijff Schaal) | 0 | 28 | 0 |
| Twente | 2011–12 | Eredivisie | 27 | 0 | 2 | 0 | – | | 9 (Note: Six appearances in UEFA Europa League and three in UEFA Champions League) | 0 | 3 | 0 | 41 | 0 |
| Twente | Total | | 71 | 1 | 11 | 0 | – | | 16 | 0 | 4 | 0 | 102 | 1 |
| Swansea City | 2012–13 | Premier League | 14 | 1 | 2 | 0 | 5 | 0 | – | | – | | 21 | 1 |
| Swansea City | 2013–14 | Premier League | 10 | 0 | 2 | 0 | 1 | 0 | 6 | 0 | 0 | 0 | 19 | 0 |
| Swansea City | 2014–15 | Premier League | 3 | 0 | 2 | 0 | 1 | 0 | 0 | 0 | 0 | 0 | 6 | 0 |
| Swansea City | Total | | 27 | 1 | 6 | 0 | 7 | 0 | 6 | 0 | 0 | 0 | 46 | 1 |
| Middlesbrough (loan) | 2014–15 | Championship | 2 | 0 | 0 | 0 | 0 | 0 | – | | 0 | 0 | 2 | 0 |
| Oxford United | 2017–18 | League One | 13 | 0 | 0 | 0 | 1 | 0 | – | | 4 (Note: Appearances in EFL Trophy) | 0 | 18 | 0 |
| Career total | | | 202 | 5 | 25 | 2 | 8 | 0 | 28 | 0 | 12 | 0 | 275 | 7 |

=== International ===
Appearances and goals by national team and year
| National team | Year | Apps | Goals |
|---|---|---|---|
| Netherlands | 2013 | 2 | 0 |
| Total | | 2 | 0 |

== Honours ==
Twente

- Eredivisie: 2009–10
- KNVB Cup: 2010–11
- Johan Cruijff Schaal: 2010, 2011

Swansea City

- Football League Cup: 2012–13
