= Patrik Ingelsten =

Swedish footballer (born 1982)

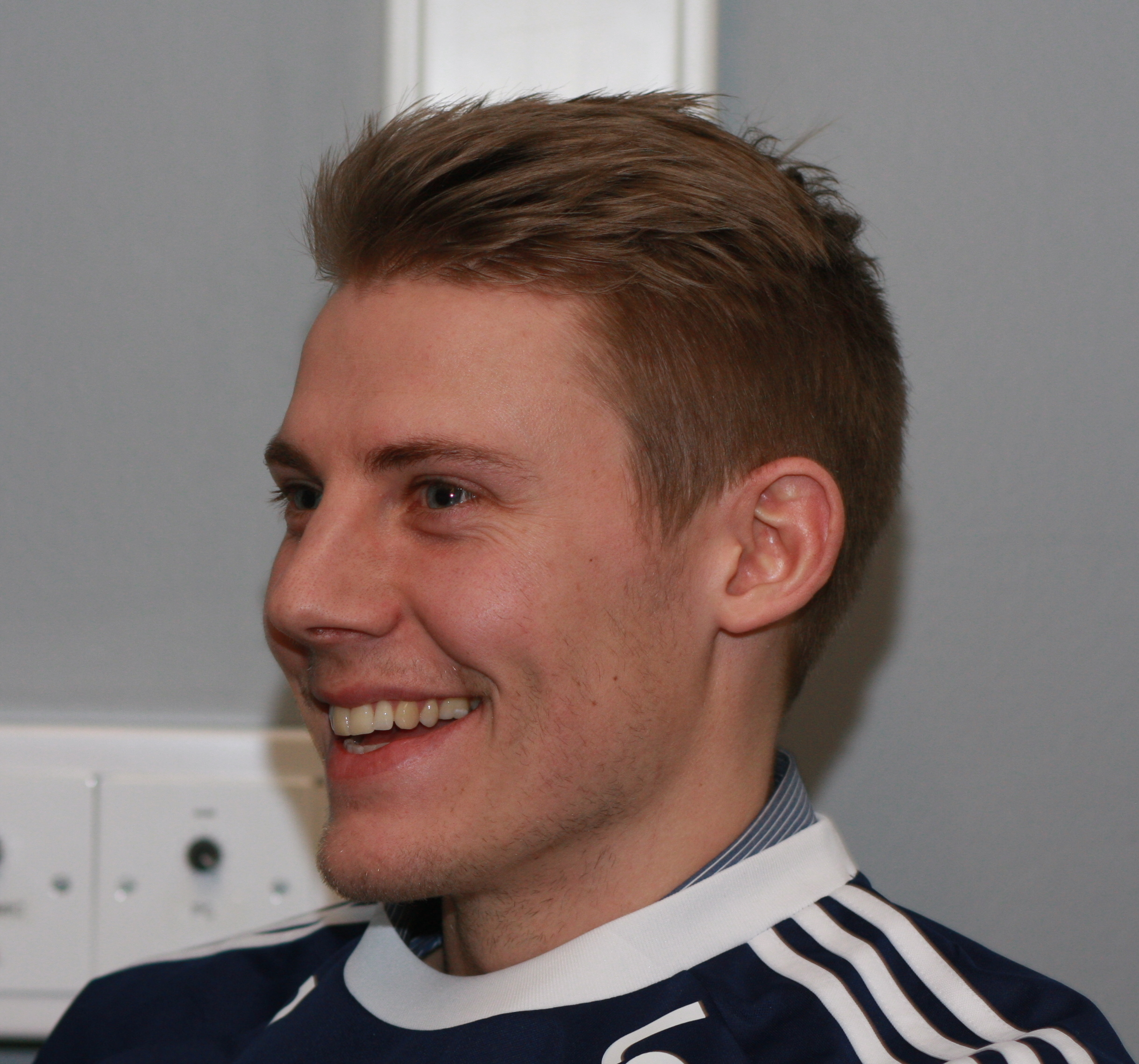
- Ingelsten in 2010

Personal information
- Full name: Patrik Severin Ingelsten
- Date of birth: 25 January 1982 (age 44)
- Place of birth: Hillerstorp, Sweden
- Height: 1.79 m (5 ft 10 in)
- Positions: Winger; forward

Youth career
- 1995–1996: Hillerstorps GoIF
- 1996–2002: IFK Värnamo
- 2002–2003: Halmstads BK

Senior career*
Years	Team	Apps	(Gls)
2001–2002	IFK Värnamo	0	(0)
2002–2007	Halmstads BK	95	(14)
2007–2009	Kalmar FF	55	(26)
2009–2010	Heerenveen	12	(2)
2010–2014	Viking	57	(15)
2014	Mjällby AIF	12	(0)
2014	→ Falkenbergs FF (loan)	15	(5)
2015	GAIS	26	(6)
2016	IS Halmia	20	(3)
Total		291	(71)

Managerial career
- 2016: IS Halmia (player-manager)
- 2017–2019: GAIS (assistant)
- 2017: GAIS (caretaker)
- 2019: GAIS (caretaker)
- 2019: GAIS
- 2022–2023: Eskilsminne IF
- 2024-2025: Jönköpings Södra IF
- * Club domestic league appearances and goals

Patrik Ingelsten (born 25 January 1982) is a Swedish football coach and former player, who played as a winger and forward.

== Playing career ==
Ingelsten started his career in Hillerstorps GoIF and played there until 1999 when he moved to IFK Värnamo, there he played for two seasons under former Swedish international star Jonas Thern and when Thern became new manager for Halmstads BK he brought Ingelsten with him, during his time in Halmstads BK he made several appearance but failed to gain the liking of the supporters, he won Stora Silvret (eng: The Big Silver) in 2004 when Halmstad missed the Allsvenskan title in the final game, he also scored the goal that would send the 2005 UEFA Cup Final runners-up Sporting Lisbon out of the 2005–06 UEFA Cup. In 2007 Ingelsten was sold to Kalmar FF, yet again winning the Stora Silvret and also winning Svenska Cupen the same year. In 2008, he became the top goalscorer in Allsvenskan with 19 goals, helping Kalmar FF win the league. This also earned him a spot in the national team against Portugal after Markus Rosenberg got injured prior to the 2010 FIFA World Cup qualification on Råsunda but never came on as a substitute.

On 22 December 2008, it was reported that he had signed for SC Heerenveen, following Viktor Elm. He scored his first Heerenveen goal in a cup win against NEC Nijmegen on 4 March 2009 and his first league goal on 14 March at home against Sparta Rotterdam.

Ingelsten was Åge Hareide's first big signing as head coach of Viking. Ingelsten wage was lower than during his time in the Dutch club, but he was still one of their best paid players during his four seasons with the club. His contract expired after the 2013 season, when the club did not agree with Ingelsten on a new contract. Viking's local rivals, Sandnes Ulf offered a contract to Ingelsten, but he moved instead home to Sweden where he signed a two-year contract with Mjällby.

== Managerial career ==
In February 2016 Ingelsten signed a contract with IS Halmia as a playing manager. He had much success here and left the club at the end of the year, to join GAIS both as an assistant manager and sporting director.

After GAIS manager Benjamin Westman got fired on 4 June 2017, Ingelsten was appointed caretaker manager of the club. He returned to the assistant manager position ahead of the 2018 season. In July 2019, he was appointed caretaker manager once again after the departure of Bosko Orović, which in September 2019 was turned permanently. He left on 27 November 2019. In 2022 he took over Eskilsminne IF.

At the end of 2023, he took over Jönköpings Södra IF. He led the club to 7th position in 2024 and 3rd in 2025 and left the club after the season.

== Career statistics ==
Appearances and goals by club, season and competition
Club	Season	League			Cup		Total	
Club	Season	Division	Apps	Goals	Apps	Goals	Apps	Goals
Halmstad	2002	Allsvenskan	15	0	0	0	15	0
Halmstad	2003	Allsvenskan	14	5	0	0	14	5
Halmstad	2004	Allsvenskan	19	3	0	0	25	10
Halmstad	2005	Allsvenskan	26	5	0	0	26	5
Halmstad	2006	Allsvenskan	20	1	0	0	20	1
Halmstad	Total		94	14	0	0	94	14
Kalmar	2007	Allsvenskan	26	7	0	0	26	7
Kalmar	2008	Allsvenskan	29	19	0	0	29	19
Kalmar	Total		55	26	0	0	55	26
Heerenveen	2008–09	Eredivisie	6	2	0	0	6	2
Heerenveen	2009–10	Eredivisie	6	0	0	0	6	0
Heerenveen	Total		12	2	0	0	12	2
Viking	2010	Tippeligaen	21	8	4	2	25	10
Viking	2011	Tippeligaen	0	0	0	0	0	0
Viking	2012	Tippeligaen	9	0	2	0	11	0
Viking	2013	Tippeligaen	27	7	1	0	28	7
Viking	Total		57	15	7	2	64	17
Mjällby	2014	Allsvenskan	12	0	3	0	15	0
Falkenbergs FF (loan)	2014	Allsvenskan	15	5	0	0	15	5
GAIS	2015	Superettan	26	6	1	0	27	6
IS Halmia	2016	Division 2 Västra Götaland	20	3	1	0	21	3
Career total			291	71	12	2	303	73

== Honours ==
Kalmar FF:

- Allsvenskan: 2008
- Svenska Cupen: 2007

SC Heerenveen

- KNVB Cup: 2009

Individual

- Allsvenskan top scorer: 2008
