= Bart Buysse =

Belgian footballer

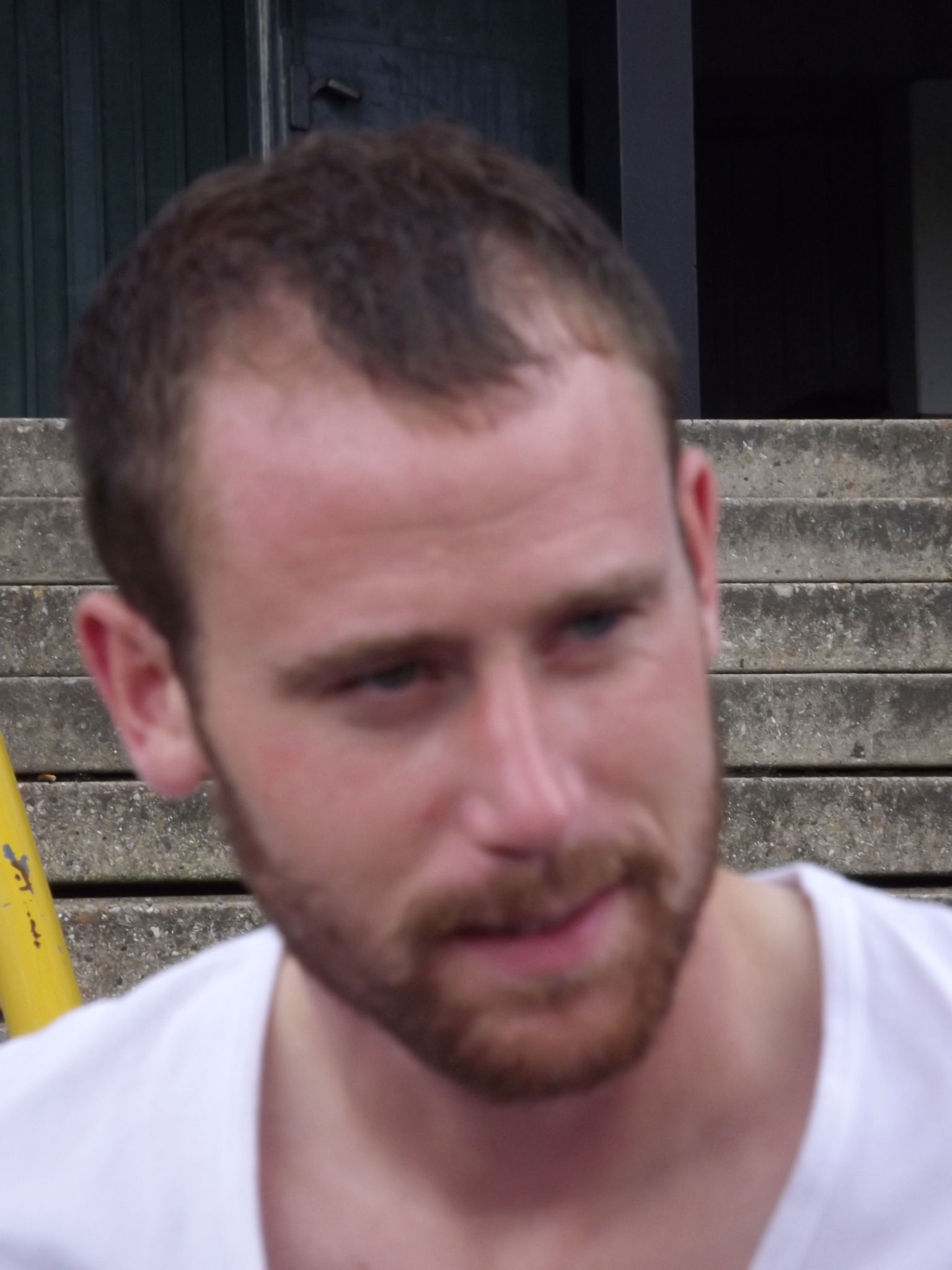

Personal information
- Full name: Bart Buysse
- Date of birth: 16 October 1986 (age 40)
- Place of birth: Beernem, Belgium
- Height: 1.78 m (5 ft 10 in)
- Position: Left back

Team information
- Current team: SV Oostkamp

Youth career
- Club Brugge

Senior career*
Years	Team	Apps	(Gls)
2006–2010	Zulte Waregem	77	(2)
2010–2012	Twente	18	(0)
2012–2013	Club Brugge	13	(0)
2013–2015	Cercle Brugge	61	(2)
2015–2016	NEC	4	(0)
2016–2019	KSCT Menen		
2019–	SV Oostkamp		

International career^{‡}
	Belgium U21	2	(0)
- * Club domestic league appearances and goals as of 22 May 2016 ‡ National team caps and goals as of 9 January 2010 (UTC)

Bart Buysse (Dutch pronunciation: [bɑrd ˈbœysə]; born 16 October 1986) is a Belgian footballer who plays as a left back for Belgian club SV Oostkamp.

== Club career ==
On 1 July 2010 it was confirmed that Buysse would be moving from Zulte-Waregem to FC Twente, where he stayed until the summer of 2012 before moving to Club Brugge. In July 2013, he signed a two-year contract with Cercle Brugge. In the summer of 2015, he moves a free player to NEC Nijmegen.

== Honours ==
Twente

- KNVB Cup: 2010–11
- Johan Cruyff Shield: 2011
