= Thilo Leugers =

German footballer

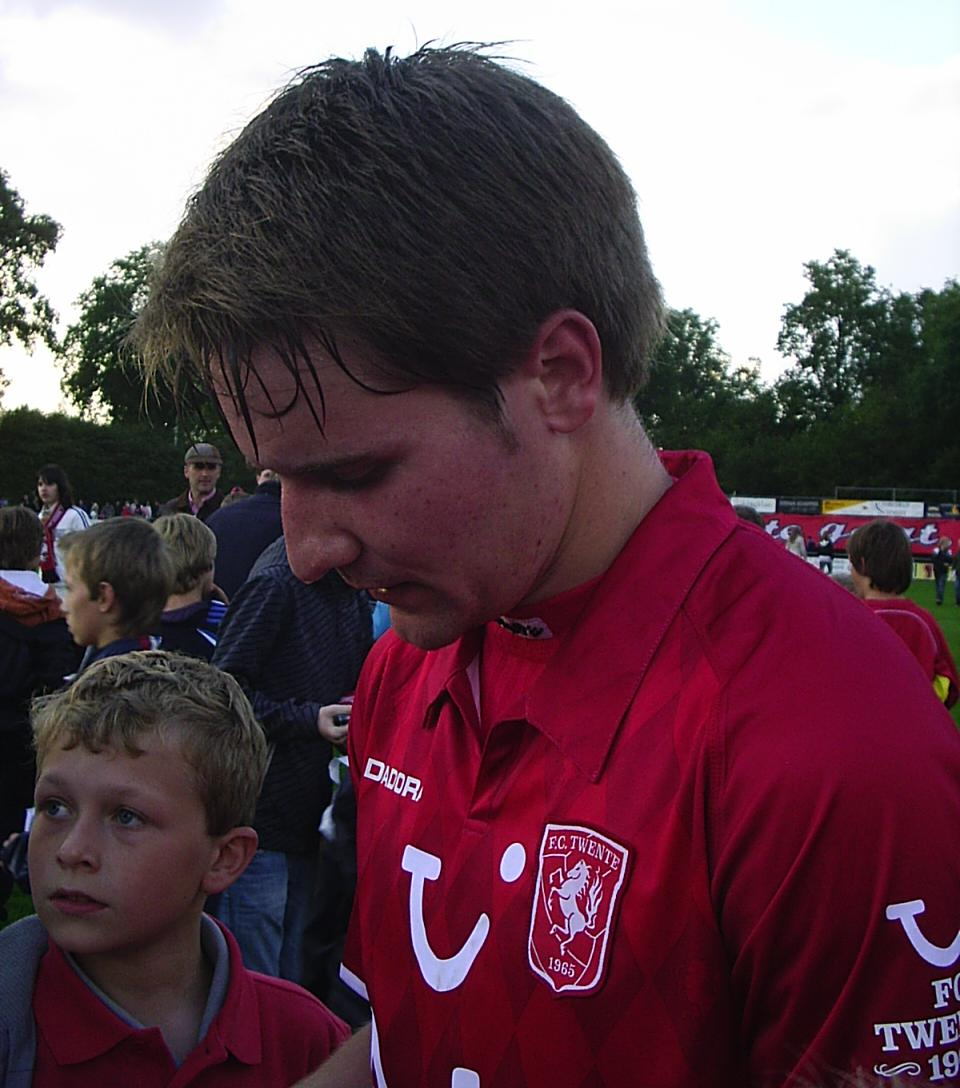
- Leugers with Twente

Personal information
- Date of birth: 9 January 1991 (age 35)
- Place of birth: Lingen, Germany
- Height: 1.84 m (6 ft 0 in)

Youth career
- SV Heidekraut Andervenne
- VA FC Twente

Senior career*
Years	Team	Apps	(Gls)
2010–2014	Twente	11	(0)
2012–2013	→ NAC Breda (loan)	14	(0)
2013–2014	Jong Twente	9	(0)
2014–2016	Atlético Baleares	40	(1)
2016–2022	SV Meppen	121	(11)
Total		195	(12)
- * Club domestic league appearances and goals

Thilo Leugers (born 9 January 1991) is a German former professional footballer who played as a midfielder.

== Career ==
In May 2022, Leugers announced his retirement from playing due to recurring injury problems. In his last game for SV Meppen against Eintracht Braunschweig, he was part of the starting eleven just to have an emotional goodbye to his fans in the stands before he was supposed to be substituted early in the game. As it happens, he of all people scored the first goal in an eventual 3-2 win before he left the game in the seventh minute under standing ovations by the Meppen fans.

== Honours ==
Twente

- Johan Cruijff Schaal: 2011
