= Nicky Kuiper =

Dutch footballer

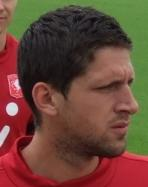

Personal information
- Date of birth: 7 June 1989 (age 37)
- Place of birth: Arnhem, Netherlands
- Height: 1.82 m (5 ft 11 1/2 in)
- Position: Left-back

Youth career
- ESA
- Vitesse

Senior career*
| Years | Team | Apps | (Gls) |
| 2008–2009 | Vitesse | 15 | (0) |
| 2009–2014 | Twente | 26 | (2) |
| 2013 | → Panathinaikos (loan) | 3 | (0) |
| 2013–2014 | Jong FC Twente | 12 | (0) |
| 2015–2016 | Willem II | 0 | (0) |
| 2016–2018 | FC Eindhoven | 8 | (0) |
| 2018 | → SV TEC (loan) | 14 | (2) |
| 2018–2019 | SV TEC | 9 | (2) |

International career^{‡}
| 2009 | Netherlands U21 | 3 | (1) |

Managerial career
- 2026–: Netherlands U19
- * Club domestic league appearances and goals as of 10:51, 20 March 2019 (UTC) ‡ National team caps and goals as of 20:35, 10 October 2009 (UTC)

Nicky Kuiper (Dutch pronunciation: [ˈnɪki ˈkœypər]; born 7 June 1989) is a Dutch former professional footballer and manager who played as a left-back. He formerly played for Vitesse, FC Twente, Panathinaikos, Willem II and SV TEC. He currently manages Netherlands U19.

== Career ==
=== Vitesse ===
Kuiper was originally a midfielder but can play in all positions on the side left. It was through the entire course and was preparing for the season 2008/2009. Kuiper began at the academy of Vitesse Arnhem. Kuiper often used in first team ins and out in a friendly match. Cooper was already during his stay in the academy of football seen as a great talent. He was selected by the KNVB to be part of the U-15 from the Netherlands, also formed part of the U-16, U-17 and U-18 from the Netherlands. Due to injuries Haim Megrelashvili and Jeroen Drost as a first choice defender in full back, Kuiper played left back in the game won with 0–2 against Heerenveen on 29 October 2008. Kuiper made 15 appearances for Vitesse.

=== Twente ===
FC Twente signed Kuiper from Vitesse for an undisclosed fee and was a replacement for Edson Braafheid. On his first season, Kuiper was involved in FC Twente squad that won FC Twente first Eredivisie title. On 1 August 2009, Kuiper made his debut for FC Twente, playing in the left back as FC Twente beat Sparta Rotterdam 2–0 at away. On 30 August 2009, Kuiper scored his first professional league goal and first for the club with his left-footed shot in the 74th minute as Twente drew 1–1 with Feyenoord. The next FC Twente game when Kuiper scored his second goal for the club and in the match in the 54th minute when Twnete went on to beat FC Utrecht 3–2, thanks to Bryan Ruiz who scored a winning goal on 12 September 2009. 5 days later, Kuiper made his Europa League debut for Twente in a 2–1 win over Turkish side Fenerbahçe S.K. where he received a booking in the 83rd minute. On his last league appearance of 2009/10 season, Kuiper provided his first assist for Ruiz to score the second goal in a match which Ruiz went on to score a hat-trick as Twente once again beat Sparta Rotterdam 3–0 on 27 March 2010. In his first season Kuiper played 24 official matches for the club (included Eredivisie, Europa League and also Europa League Qualification and KNVB Beker) and scored twice. Also during his first season, Kuiper has admitted his surprise that he is not in a first-team regular under Steve McClaren.

In his second season at Twente, Kuiper start his season badly, having suffered a serious knee problem Despite this, Kuiper involved in the Twente's squad that won the Johan Cruijff-schaal XV against Ajax; made his UEFA Champions League debut in a 4–1 loss against English side Tottenham Hotspur on 29 September 2010. Kuiper played less due to injuries. During training based in La Manga, Spain, where the Twente are preparing for the second half of the Eredivisie season, having a winter break, Kuiper sustained cruciate ligament damage in his left knee for the second time in less than a year and is set for another long absence and has to miss the rest of the season with a persistent knee injury. After one year and a half of recovering his injuries, Kuiper made his return for Twente where he started in the match until coming off in the 82nd minute for Dwight Tiendalli as Twente won 2–1 over De Graafschap on 21 March 2012. However, towards the end of the season, Kuiper was sometime used, as an unused substitute in the matches. The next season, he made his first start of the season, in the first round of Europa League match, as Twente destroyed UE Santa Coloma 6–0 and would go through to the next round. However, like last season, Kuiper was barely used in the league, though playing twice in KNVB Beker campaign and lost his place to Edson Braafheid, making him a third choice defender soon after.

=== Panathinaikos (loan) ===
On 31 January 2013, Kuiper signed with Greek side Panathinaikos on a six-month loan. Kuiper was also previously linked with Ingolstadt 04 After moving, Kuiper says he was surprised to never be in the squad at Twente and hopes he earns his first team back.

== International career ==
Following his signing for Twente, Kuiper was called up for Netherlands national under-21 football team and Kuiper currently made 3 appearances and scoring 1 for Netherlands U21.

== Honours ==
=== Club ===
Twente

- Eredivisie: 2009–10
- Johan Cruijff Shield: Johan Cruijff-schaal XV
