= Douglas (footballer, born 1988) =

Brazilian footballer

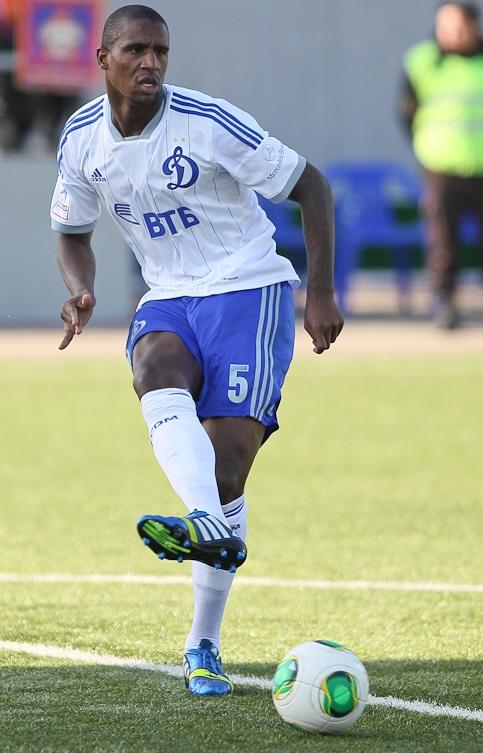
- Douglas playing for Dynamo Moscow in 2013

Personal information
- Full name: Douglas Franco Teixeira
- Date of birth: 12 January 1988 (age 38)
- Place of birth: Florianópolis, Santa Catarina, Brazil
- Position: Centre-back

Team information
- Current team: SC Barbaros

Senior career*
Years	Team	Apps	(Gls)
2006–2007	Joinville	2	(0)
2007–2013	Twente	162	(15)
2013–2015	Dynamo Moscow	45	(3)
2015–2016	Trabzonspor	16	(0)
2016–2017	Sporting CP	2	(0)
2016–2017	Sporting CP B	1	(0)
2020–2021	Würzburger Kickers	16	(1)
2021–	SC Barbaros		
- * Club domestic league appearances and goals as of 4 October 2020

Douglas Franco Teixeira (born 12 January 1988), simply known as Douglas, is a Brazilian professional footballer who plays as a centre-back for Dutch amateur club SC Barbaros.

Born in Brazil, he is also a naturalized citizen of the Netherlands, holding Dutch citizenship and being eligible to represent the Netherlands national team at international level.

== Club career ==
=== Twente ===
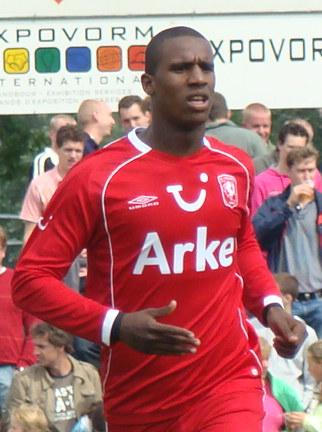
Douglas with Twente in 2008.

Born in Florianópolis, Douglas began his career with Joinville at the age of 16. Douglas joined Dutch team Twente on trial prior to the 2007–08 season, playing his first match in a friendly against Borussia Mönchengladbach on 7 September 2007, which saw Twente draw 2–2. Douglas impressed the club's management, resulting Douglas signing a three-year contract with Twente on 24 September 2007.

After playing in the reserve for the first three months at the club, Douglas made his competitive Twente debut on 22 December 2007, coming on as a 90th-minute substitute in an Eredivisie match against Heerenveen. He then made his first start for the club came on 23 February 2008 against AZ Alkmaar, in a 0–0 draw. Douglas scored his first FC Twente goal two weeks later on 11 March 2008, in a 1–0 win over VVV-Venlo. Unfortunately, Douglas was sent-off in the 42nd minute against Utrecht after a second bookable offense when he suspended of elbowing Mousa Dembélé, which Twente won 1–0. Because of elbow contact, Douglas was given a three-man ban by the Dutch FA, but won via appeal and missed one game. Douglas made twelve appearances and scoring once in his first season at the club. In May 2008, his playing form attracted interest from "several bigger clubs". However, he opted to sign a contract extension until 2012.

In the 2008–09 season, Douglas played in both legs of the Champions League play-offs against Arsenal, but they proved to be too strong and failed to win either leg losing 2–0 and 4–0 respectively. Douglas scored his first goal of the 2008–09 season, in a 2–0 win over Willem II on 21 December 2008. But during a match against Willem II, Douglas suffered a knee injury, resulting in surgery and fear over whether or not Douglas played again this season. Eventually, Douglas overcome his fears from surgery and returning to training, Douglas made his return in a reserve match against PSV, which ended a 2–2 draw. Douglas then made his return to the first team, where he came on as a substitute for Ronnie Stam in the 83rd minute, in a 4–1 win over NAC Breda on 4 February 2009. Two months later on 11 April 2009, Douglas scored his second goal of the season, in a 4–2 win over Roda JC. But in the next game against Feyenoord seven days later, Douglas was sent-off for a second bookable offense in the 78th minute, which Twente lost 1–0. Despite being sent-off in the league, Douglas played in the semi-final of KNVB Beker, where he set up a goal for Romano Denneboom to score the second, in a 3–1 win over NAC Breda. Douglas returned from suspension and was involved of providing assist for Peter Wisgerhof, who scored the second goal of the game, in a 3–0 win over AZ Alkmaar, with the win ensure Twente to earn a Champions League spot in the third qualifying round next season. Unfortunately, Douglas was unable to help win their first Dutch Cup in nine years after losing on penalty shoot-out to Heerenveen. Despite this, Douglas went on to make twenty-eight appearances and scoring two times in the 2008–09 season.

In the 2009–10 season, Douglas played in both legs of the Champions League's third qualifying round against Sporting Lisbon and scored in the second leg, but was eliminated in the Champions League, as a result of away goal. After missing the opening game of the season, due to suspension, Douglas scored his first goal in his first appearance of the 2009–10 season, in a 1–1 draw against PSV Eindhoven. Eleven days later, Douglas scored in the play-off round of Europa League, in a 3–1 win over Qarabağ and eventually went through in the second leg after a 0–0 draw. On 26 September 2009, Douglas scored his second league goal of the season, in a 2–1 win over VVV-Venlo. Douglas established himself in the first team and throughout the season, he continued to top the league in the latter part of the season, holding off the likes of renowned competitors PSV and Ajax. Eventually, the club was later crowned champions of Eredivisie for the first time in its history after beating NAC Breda 2–0 in the last game of the season despite not playing, due to suspension. Douglas went on to make thirty-one appearances in the 2009–10 season, having missed three matches due to suspension. At the end of the 2009–10 season, Douglas was among three players to be named Algemeen Daglad's National Team of the Year.

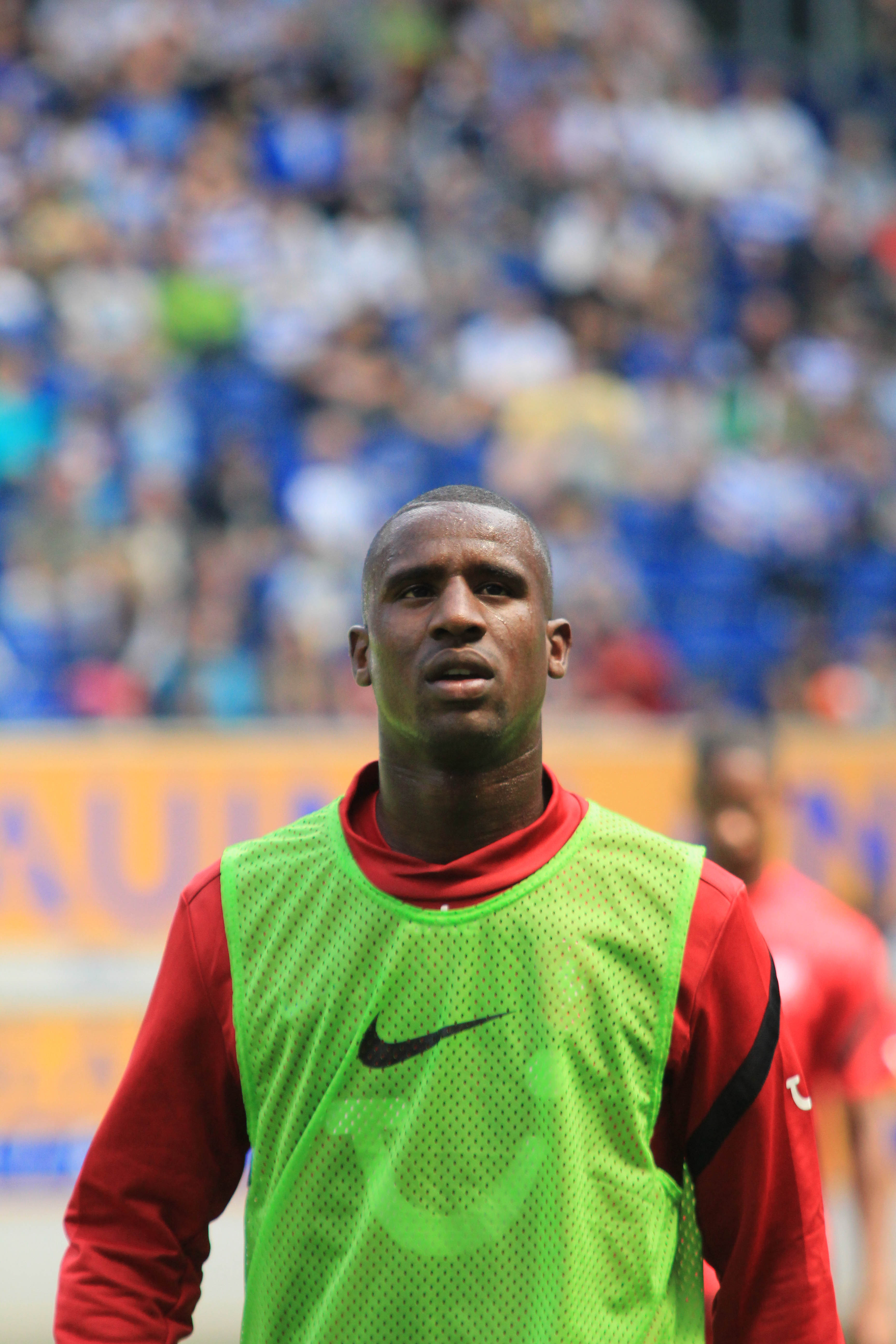
Douglas with Twente in 2012.

Ahead of the 2010–11 season, his impressive form over the next season drew the attention of Italian team Juventus, as well as German teams Hamburger SV and VfL Wolfsburg. He dismissed interest from fellow Dutch clubs PSV and Ajax as he felt it was "inconceivable" for him to play for any team in the Netherlands other than Twente. Following Steve McClaren's departure to Wolfsburg, Douglas, along with Bryan Ruiz, were linked with a move to Wolfsburg to join him. Nevertheless, Douglas remained at Twente and continued to remain in the first team, where provided assist for Nacer Chadli, who scored the only goal for Twente, in a 4–1 loss against Tottenham Hotspur on 29 September 2010. Douglas then scored his first goal of the season, in a 3–1 win over Willem II on 27 October 2010. Douglas was then sent-off in a match against N.E.C. on 20 November 2010, for fouling on Maarten Martens, in a 2–1 loss against AZ. After the match, Douglas received a one match ban. Three months later on 24 February 2011, Douglas scored in the second leg of Round of 32 of Europa League, in a 2–2 draw against Rubin Kazan. Four days later on 28 February 2011, Douglas was suspended for six matches by the Dutch FA. The suspension related to an incident in Twente's previous match against AZ Alkmaar in which he was sent off for what initially looked like a punch on AZ midfielder Pontus Wernbloom, but after replays it was discovered there was no contact. In protest he proceeded to push match referee Ruud Bossen and then push Pontus Wernbloom whilst being escorted off. Douglas had already been fined and suspended by Twente for the original sending off. After the announcement was made, Douglas said he vowed never got into this situation again. Though serving six matches, including the semi-final in KNVB Bekker, Douglas continued to make an appearance in the Europa League, but made his return to the first team, in a 1–1 draw against De Graafschap on 17 April 2011. Two weeks later on 1 May 2011, Douglas scored his second league goal against Willem II for the second time this season, with a 4–0 win. Douglas played in the final of KNVB Cup, where he played 120 minutes, in a 3–2 win over Ajax. Douglas finished the 2010–11 season, with twenty-eight appearances and scoring two times.

At the start of the 2011–12 season, it was announced that Douglas would continue playing for Twente next season, with Ligue 1 side Lyon were keen to sign him. In the Johan Cruijff Schaal, Douglas started the season well when he played 90 minutes, as he helped Twente win 2–1 against Ajax. Douglas then scored his first goal of the season, in a 5–2 win over ADO Den Haag on 18 September 2011. His second goal then came in a 2–2 draw against PSV on 29 October 2011. After being granted as a Netherlands' citizens, the club's chairman said he started negotiating with Douglas over a new contract with the club. Douglas came under criticism from Manager Co Adriaanse after making a mistake that allowed Tim Matavž to score in a 2–1 win in the last 16 of KNVB Bekker. When Twente met PSV on 4 March 2012 which they lost 6–2, Douglas was sent-off in the 51st minute after fouling Ola Toivonen and resulted him a three match ban. After serving a three match ban, Douglas made his return to the first team, in a 1–1 draw against ADO Den Haag on 24 March 2012. Douglas later added two more goals in the 2011–12 season against Roda JC and Heerenveen. Eight days later in the play-offs for the Europa League qualification, Douglas scored in the first leg, in a 1–1 draw against RKC Waalwijk, but lost 1–0 in the second leg. Douglas finished his 2011–12 season, with thirty appearances and scoring four times.

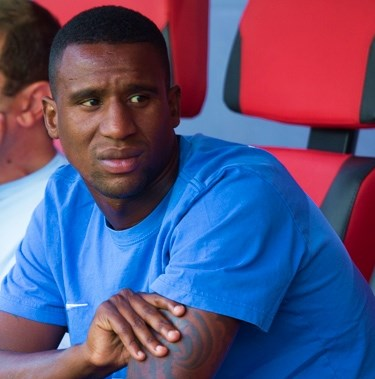
Douglas on the substitute at Dynamo Moscow.

In the 2012–13 season, Douglas said he wanted to leave Twente, stating he keen to play abroad, having outgrown the league. However, Douglas angered Manager McClaren after he was returned from his holiday in Brazil for personal reasons and was fined and sent to the youth team as a result. Douglas soon made his return to the first team. Douglas continued to be in the transfer spotlight when Newcastle United made a €4 million, a move was later confirmed by the player, himself. However, Douglas was unaware of the interest from Newcastle United. Not only, Fulham and West Ham United. With Douglas expected to leave the club in the transfer window, it appeared that Douglas made his last appearance for the club, in a 1–0 win over NAC Breda. However, Douglas went under surgery after suffering an injury, preventing him from making a move. Douglas scored his first Twente goal in the group stage of Europa League, in a 2–2 draw against Helsingborg on 4 October 2012. Douglas then scored his first league goal for the club, in a 1–1 draw against Willem II on 26 February 2013. Douglas scored two goals later in the season against ADO Den Haag and NEC. Douglas finished his 2012–13 season, with thirty-one appearances and scoring three times.

After the 2012–13 season came to an end, Douglas stated he will leave the club in the summer, resulting Douglas linked with a move further. Douglas was on the verge of joining Russian side Anzhi Makhachkala. However, Douglas rejected the move, preferring to stay at the club when the 2012–13 season finished. Another interested was Hannover 96, who offered him annual salary €1.4 million.

=== Dynamo Moscow ===
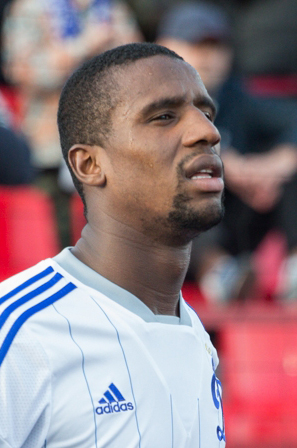
Douglas in 2013 at Dynamo Moscow.

On 17 July 2013, Douglas signed for Russian side Dynamo Moscow on a three-year contract and was given a number five shirt upon joining the club.

Douglas made his Dynamo Moscow debut, where he played 90 minutes, in a 1–1 draw against Rostov on 1 September 2013. Three weeks after making his debut on 21 September 2013, Douglas was sent-off in the 74th minute, for a foul in the penalty spot, resulting Lokomotiv Moscow score the second goal in the game, in a 3–1 loss against them. In his first season at Dynamo Moscow, Douglas made twenty appearances for the club, which resulted the club finishing fourth place and earning a Europa League next season. Douglas also experienced playing football in snowy weather, to which he managed to adapt, rather finding it as a problem.

In the 2014–15 season, Douglas started well, having remained in the first team regular this season and scored his first Dynamo Moscow goal, in a 2–1 win over Arsenal Tula on 17 August 2014. However, Douglas find himself in the pecking order, under manager Stanislav Cherchesov, as he compete for centre-back position with Tomáš Hubočan and Christopher Samba. He then scored his second goal of the season on 12 April 2015, in a 2–1 win over Mordovia Saransk. His third goal later came on 3 May 2015, in a 3–1 win over Kuban Krasnodar. In his second season, Douglas made twenty-three appearances and scoring three times.

Ahead of the 2015–16 season, Douglas was linked with a move to 1. FC Köln and Sporting Lisbon. But Douglas insisted his main focus was on Dynamo Moscow despite the club's financial problem. Douglas was not included in the first few games due to injury he sustained in the training camp. Douglas made his first team return on 16 August 2015 against Ural Sverdlovsk Oblast, where he came on as a substitute for Yuri Zhirkov in the 80th minute, which Dynamo Moscow won 1–0.

=== Trabzonspor ===
After a two years spell at Russia, Douglas signed for Süper Lig side Trabzonspor for 1.5 million euro, signing a three-year contract on 29 August 2015.

Douglas made his Trabzonspor debut, in the opening game of the season, where he played the whole game, in a 1–0 win over Kayserispor. However, Douglas suffered an injury at the end of 2015, as well as, suspension. On 7 February 2016, Douglas returned to the first team after months on the sidelines, where he set up a goal, but received a red card, in a 2–1 loss against Akhisar Belediyespor. After serving a three match suspension, Douglas, however, continued to suffer injuries towards the end of the season.

Douglas finished his first season at the club, making twenty-one appearances in all competitions. With his poor season at the club, Douglas was expected to leave the club next season.

=== Sporting ===
On 25 August 2016, he signed a three-season contract with an extension option with the Portuguese club Sporting.

On 13 October 2016, he made his Sporting debut in the third round of Taça de Portugal, in a 1–0 win over Famalicão. Two months later, Douglas made his league debut, where he made his first start and played 45 minutes, in a 1–0 loss against Braga.

On 1 February 2018, Douglas revealed that he tested positive for doping in late April 2017.

=== Würzburger Kickers ===
After serving his two-year doping suspension, on 11 August 2020 he signed a one-year contract with an option for the second year with the German 2. Bundesliga club Würzburger Kickers.

== International career ==
Despite being born in Brazil, in September 2010 Douglas spoke of his desire to play international football for the Netherlands. However, his hopes of playing for the Netherlands was threatened by politicians, who were trying to prevent Douglas from playing the national team, citing examples of Salomon Kalou. After gaining his Netherlands citizenship in March 2011, Douglas was not eligible to play for Netherlands, having yet met the requirement of FIFA rules.

On 2 November 2011, he received his Dutch passport. Douglas' passport was presented by Mayor of Enschede, Peter den Oudsten. As a result, Douglas had to revoke his Brazilian passport. Douglas' first call-up to the Netherlands national team was in October 2012.

Despite being keen to play for the Netherlands in the 2014 FIFA World Cup, he was not selected for the final 23-man squad.

== Personal life ==
In March 2011, Douglas passed his Dutch citizenship exams, receiving his passport in November of that year.

== Honours ==
Twente

- Eredivisie: 2009–10
- KNVB Cup: 2010–11
- Johan Cruijff Schaal: 2010, 2011

== See also ==
- List of doping cases in sport
