= Dario Vujičević =

Croatian-German footballer

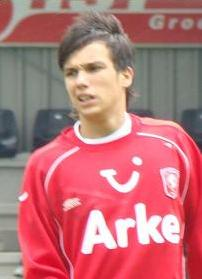
- Vujičević playing for FC Twente

Personal information
- Date of birth: 1 April 1990 (age 36)
- Place of birth: Sarajevo, SFR Yugoslavia
- Height: 1.80 m (5 ft 11 in)
- Position: Midfielder

Youth career
- –2001: SpVgg Emsdetten 05
- 2001–2007: Schalke 04
- 2007–2009: Twente

Senior career*
Years	Team	Apps	(Gls)
2009–2012	Twente	23	(0)
2011	→ VVV-Venlo (loan)	15	(1)
2012–2017	Heracles Almelo	31	(1)
2018–2019	Eintracht Rheine	5	(0)
Total		74	(2)

International career
2010–2011	Croatia U21	8	(0)
- * Club domestic league appearances and goals

Dario Vujičević (born 1 April 1990) is a Croatian retired professional footballer who played as a midfielder. Raised in Germany, he also holds German citizenship.

== Club career ==
=== Early life ===
Vujičević was born in Sarajevo, then still part of SFR Yugoslavia, his family later fled to Gronau, Germany and close to the Dutch border, to escape the Bosnian War.

=== Netherlands ===
After coming through the FC Twente youth system, he was promoted to their senior side in 2009. He was loaned to VVV-Venlo in January 2011. After joining Dutch side Heracles Almelo in summer 2012, Vujičević was plagued by injuries, being out of the team for long periods. In February 2017, he agreed to be released from his contract from 1 March.
