= Theo Janssen =

Dutch footballer (born 1981)

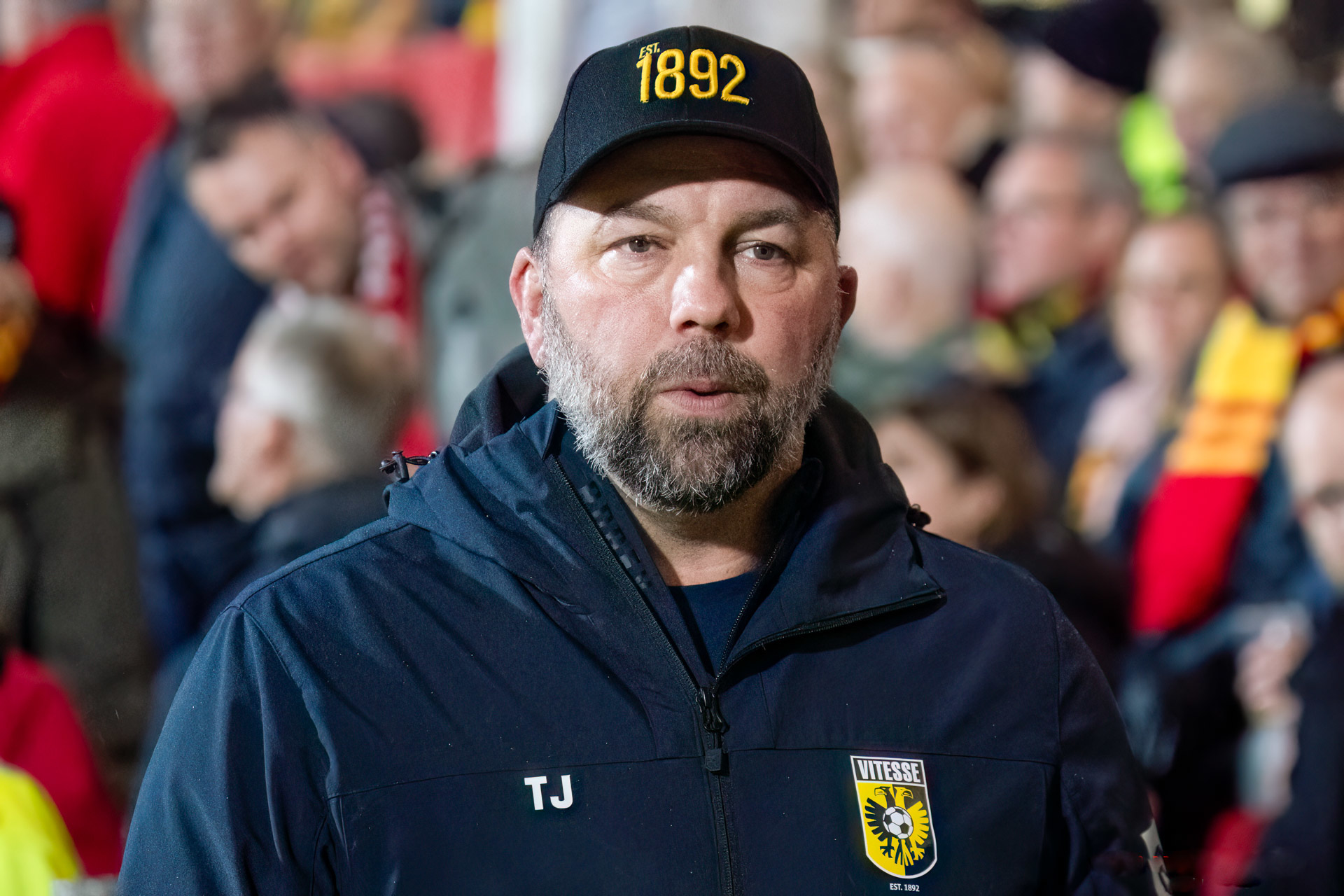
- Janssen in 2023 as Vitesse assistant coach

Personal information
- Full name: Theo Janssen
- Date of birth: 27 July 1981 (age 45)
- Place of birth: Arnhem, Netherlands
- Height: 1.80 m (5 ft 11 in)
- Position: Midfielder

Team information
- Current team: De Treffers

Youth career
- –1995: Vitesse 1892
- 1995–1998: Vitesse

Senior career*
Years	Team	Apps	(Gls)
1998–2008	Vitesse	206	(21)
2003–2004	→ Genk (loan)	15	(2)
2008–2011	Twente	86	(18)
2011–2012	Ajax	31	(9)
2012–2014	Vitesse	36	(2)
Total		374	(52)

International career
2006–2011	Netherlands	5	(0)

Managerial career
- 2022–2025: Vitesse (assistant)
- 2025–: De Treffers
- * Club domestic league appearances and goals

Theo Janssen (born 27 July 1981) is a Dutch coach at De Treffers and former footballer who played as a midfielder for various clubs in the Netherlands, including Vitesse, Twente and Ajax, as well as on loan for Belgian club Genk. He spent 10 years with Vitesse before joining Twente in 2008, where he helped them win the Eredivisie and qualify for the Champions League for the first time in their history. After being named Dutch Footballer of the Year in 2011, he played a season with Ajax, before returning to Vitesse in August 2012.

== Club career ==
=== Vitesse ===
Janssen began his career at amateur club Vitesse Arnhem 1892 and played from 1995 to 1996 in the reserves of Vitesse. After breaking through in several youth teams Janssen made his professional debut on 9 December 1998 in the first team against NAC Breda, which Vitesse won 2–0. Janssen came in as substitute in 90th minute to replace Marian Zeman. Janssen played 5 games that season for Vitesse. The next season Janssen made 17 appearances for Vitesse. In the 2000–2001 season Janssen became a starter for Vitesse and made 30 appearances, in which he scored once. In September Janssen broke his shin, he played 10 games total that season, and scored 1 goal.

=== Genk ===
For the 2003–04 season Janssen was loaned to Genk in Belgium. He made 15 appearances and scored two goals before returning to Vitesse in January 2004.

=== Return to Vitesse ===
Janssen played another 16 games in 2004 in which he scored one goal.

He played primarily on the wing in the following season. His leg operation was sometimes troubling him, nevertheless he made 28 appearances in which he scored 8 goals.

In the 2005–06 season he played 30 games for Vitesse and scored 7 goals. Janssen's good performance at Vitesse was not unseen, as he received an invitation for the Netherlands national football team for a friendly game against Ecuador on 1 March 2006. However, Janssen could not play, due to surgery on his tonsils.

Janssen remained a regular starter for Vitesse in the following season, and was again selected to play for Oranje. This time he was able to play and made his debut for Oranje in a friendly against Ireland. He came in the 83rd minute for Stijn Schaars. On 2 September 2006, Janssen started for Oranje in a European Championship qualifier against Luxembourg. Janssen made only 22 appearances for Vitesse that season, due to injuries and suspensions. Vitesse trainer Aad de Mos told Janssen he could search for another club, despite an existing contract until 2009.

During the 2007–08 season, Janssen once again got injured, this time for several months. He returned playing in late 2007.

=== Twente ===
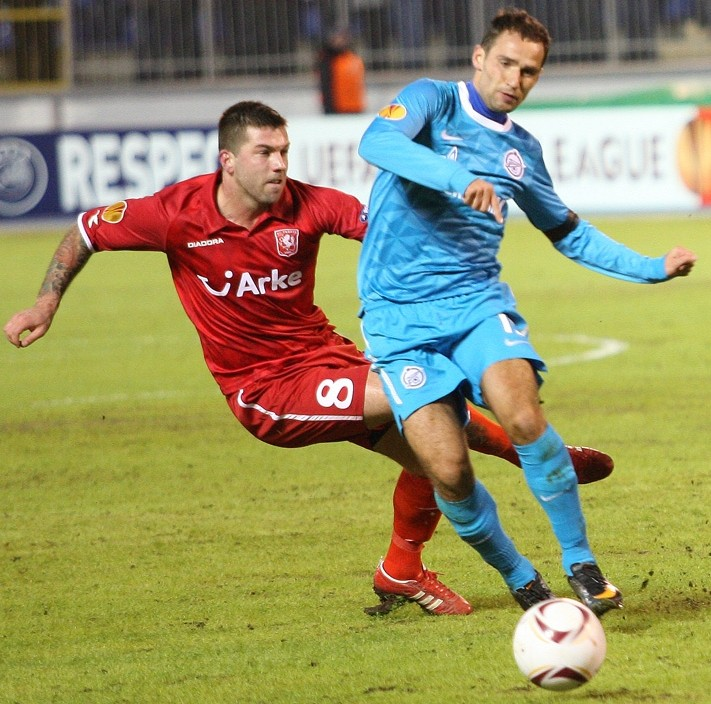
Janssen playing with Twente against Zenit, March 2011.

In mid-April 2008 FC Twente announcing the signing Janssen for the upcoming season on a contract until 2012. The transfer fee was approximately worth €1.5 million.

In November 2009 Janssen was suspended by Twente for two months, after a drunk-driving crash. One of his passengers, former professional goalkeeper Kevin Moeliker, ended up in hospital where he was kept in a coma for several days. He lost one of his ears in the crash. Moeliker later recovered, but in 2017 it was revealed that he suffered lasting brain damage from the crash, albeit still being able to function and work. Janssen won the Eredivisie that year with FC Twente.

In the 2010–11 season Janssen had his best season up to that point. He won the Johan Cruijff Schaal and the KNVB Cup with Twente. He scored 20 goals in 46 appearances, which made him club top scorer, among them some important goals for Twente like against Inter Milan, Werder Bremen, Ajax and PSV. He was also voted best player of the Eredivisie of the season 2010–11.

=== Ajax ===
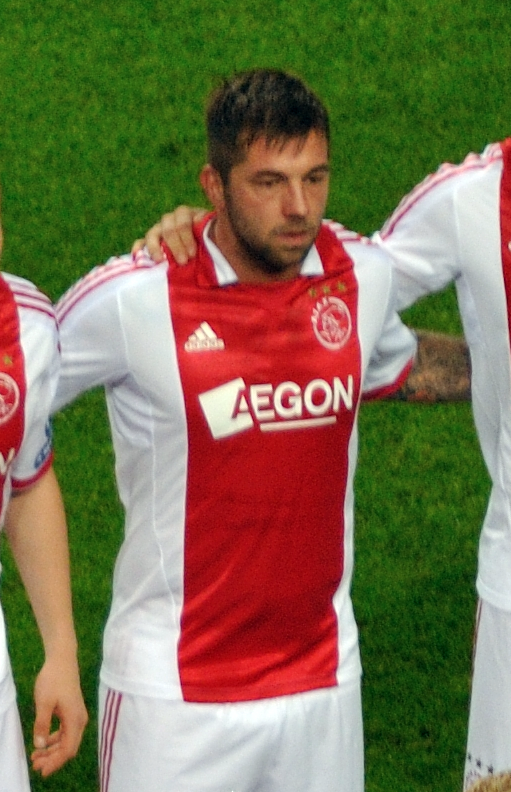
Janssen lining up for Ajax, September 2011.

On 23 May 2011, Ajax and Twente agreed on a transfer of Janssen to Ajax. The transfer fee was worth €3.2 million. Janssen signed a contract with Ajax for two years and was handed the number 16 shirt, previously worn by Luis Suárez. His first couple of matches for Ajax were not very successful, as coach Frank de Boer decided that Janssen had to play as a defensive midfielder, which was not Janssen's best position. After he was playing in a more attacking position, Janssen became very important in achieving the league victory in 2012.

=== Second return to Vitesse ===
Janssen wanted to leave Ajax, after he had heard from Frank de Boer that he would be playing fewer matches in the coming season. He refused to play a role as substitute. On 27 August 2012, Janssen returned to Vitesse for a fee of approximately €600,000.

=== End of active football career ===
After suffering from different injuries of which the latest involved a meniscus operation, Janssen on 4 March 2014 announced that he would immediately end his active football career and that he would pursue a career with Vitesse as a scout for youth players and specialist trainer.

== International career ==
Janssen made his debut for the Netherlands national team against the Republic of Ireland in August 2006.

International appearances and goals
App	Date	Venue	Opponent	Result	Goal	Competition
2006
1	16 August 2006	Lansdowne Road, Dublin	Republic of Ireland	0–4	0	Friendly
2	9 September 2006	Stade Josy Barthel, Luxembourg	Luxembourg	0–1	0	Euro 2008 qualifying
2010
3	11 August 2010	Donbas Arena, Donetsk	Ukraine	1–1	0	Friendly
4	17 November 2010	Amsterdam ArenA, Amsterdam	Turkey	1–0	0	Friendly
2011
5	9 February 2011	Philips Stadion, Eindhoven	Austria	3–1	0	Friendly

== Career statistics ==
=== Club performance ===
Club performance			League		Cup		Continental		Other		Total	
Season	Club	League	Apps	Goals	Apps	Goals	Apps	Goals	Apps	Goals	Apps	Goals
Netherlands			League		KNVB Cup		Europe		Other		Total	
1998–99	Vitesse	Eredivisie	5	0	0	0	0	0	-		5	0
1999–00	Vitesse	Eredivisie	17	0	0	0	5	0	-		22	0
2000–01	Vitesse	Eredivisie	30	1	2	0	4	0	-		36	1
2001–02	Vitesse	Eredivisie	10	1	3	1	-		-		13	2
2002–03	Vitesse	Eredivisie	28	0	2	0	6	0	-		36	0
2003–04	Vitesse	Eredivisie	16	1	0	0	-		-		16	1
Belgium			League		Belgian Cup		Europe		Other		Total	
2003–04	Racing Genk	Belgian Pro League	15	2	0	0	-		-		15	2
Netherlands			League		KNVB Cup		Europe		Other		Total	
2004–05	Vitesse	Eredivisie	29	8	3	0	-		-		32	8
2005–06	Vitesse	Eredivisie	30	7	1	1	-		-		31	8
2006–07	Vitesse	Eredivisie	22	1	1	0	-		-		23	1
2007–08	Vitesse	Eredivisie	19	2	1	0	-		-		20	2
2008–09	FC Twente	Eredivisie	28	4	6	2	8	0	-		42	6
2009–10	FC Twente	Eredivisie	28	1	2	0	10	1	-		40	2
2010–11	FC Twente	Eredivisie	30	13	4	4	11	3	-		45	20
2011–12	Ajax	Eredivisie	29	8	2	0	6	0	1	0	33	8
2012–13	Ajax	Eredivisie	2	1	0	0	0	0	1	0	3	1
2012–13	Vitesse	Eredivisie	27	1	4	2	0	0	-		31	3
2013–14	Vitesse	Eredivisie	9	1	1	1	2	0	-		12	2
Total	Belgium		15	2	0	0	-		-		15	2
Total	Netherlands		359	50	32	11	52	4	2	0	446	65
Career total			374	52	32	11	52	4	2	0	461	67

=== International performance ===
Netherlands national team
Year	Apps	Goals
2006	2	0
2010	2	0
2011	1	0
Total	5	0

== Honours ==
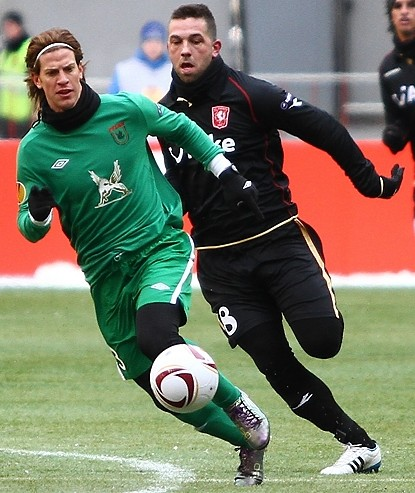
Janssen (right) with Twente, chasing down Cristian Ansaldi (left) of Rubin Kazan, February 2011.

=== Club ===
FC Twente

- Eredivisie: 2009–10
- KNVB Cup: 2010–11
- Johan Cruijff Schaal: 2010

Ajax

- Eredivisie: 2011–12

=== Individual ===
- Dutch Footballer of the Year: 2011
- Gelders Sportsman of the Year: 2011
