= Peter Wisgerhof =

Dutch footballer

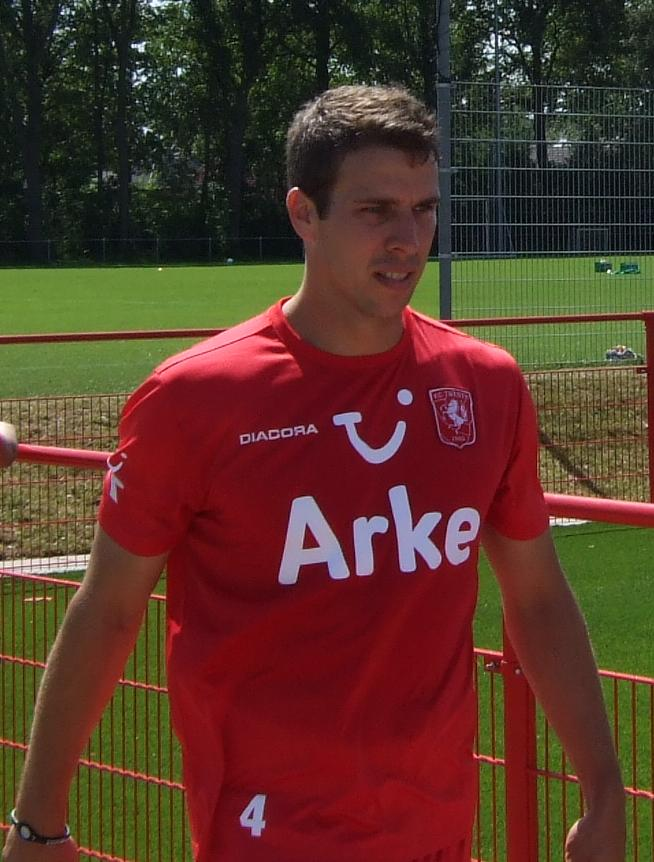
- Wisgerhof in 2010

Personal information
- Date of birth: 19 November 1979 (age 46)
- Place of birth: Wageningen, Netherlands
- Height: 1.81 m (5 ft 11 in)
- Position: Centre-back

Youth career
- ONA '53
- Vitesse

Senior career*
Years	Team	Apps	(Gls)
1999–2000	Vitesse	15	(0)
2000–2009	NEC	270	(16)
2009–2014	Twente	122	(8)
Total		407	(24)

International career
2000–2001	Netherlands U21	13	(1)
2010–2011	Netherlands	2	(0)
- * Club domestic league appearances and goals

Peter Wisgerhof (Dutch pronunciation: [ˈpeːtər ˈʋɪsxərɔf]; born 19 November 1979) is a Dutch former professional footballer who played as a centre-back for Vitesse, NEC and Twente.

== Club career ==
Wisgerhof made his debut in professional football, being part of the Vitesse squad in the 1999–2000 season. He was allowed to sign on loan with NEC for half a year. He then signed permanently with NEC, then played nine seasons for the club until making a switch in 2009 to Twente, who had sold defender Rob Wielaert to Ajax. Wisgerhof signed a contract with Twente for three-and-a-half years. Here he has quickly played himself into the squad.

In his second season, 2009–10, Twente became Eredivisie champions. In the summer of 2010, he became captain, after Blaise Nkufo left Twente for Seattle Sounders FC. At the start of the 2010–11 season, he and Twente won the Johan Cruyff Shield after defeating Ajax 1–0.

In 2011, Twente came second in the 2010–11 Eredivisie, behind Ajax. Wisgerhof played a notable role in this victory as he was claimed to have made an obvious schwalbe (dive), which was much commented on in the local and international press. On 30 July 2011, Wisgerhof won his second Johan Cruyff Shield with Twente after his side again defeated Ajax, 2–1.

== International career ==
Wisgerhof made 13 appearances for the Netherlands national under-21 team, scoring one goal. On 10 October 2010, Netherlands senior team head coach Bert van Marwijk called him up (at age 30) to the squad for the 17 November match against Turkey. In the second half of the match, Wisgerhof made his debut as a substitution for the injured Joris Mathijsen.

== Career statistics ==
=== Club ===
Appearances and goals by club, season and competition
Club	Season	League			KNVB Cup		Europe (Note: Includes UEFA Champions League and UEFA Europa League matches.)		Other (Note: Includes the Johan Cruyff Shield and Eredivisie playoffs matches.)		Total	
Club	Season	Division	Apps	Goals	Apps	Goals	Apps	Goals	Apps	Goals	Apps	Goals
Vitesse	1999–00	Eredivisie	15	0	0	0	3	0	–		18	0
NEC	2000–01	Eredivisie	34	4	4	1	–		–		38	1
NEC	2001–02	Eredivisie	30	1	1	0	–		–		31	1
NEC	2002–03	Eredivisie	32	1	4	0	–		–		36	1
NEC	2003–04	Eredivisie	33	1	1	0	2	0	–		36	1
NEC	2004–05	Eredivisie	27	1	1	0	2	0	–		30	1
NEC	2005–06	Eredivisie	31	0	4	1	–		3	0	38	1
NEC	2006–07	Eredivisie	34	2	2	0	–		2	1	38	2
NEC	2007–08	Eredivisie	32	1	3	1	–		6	0	41	2
NEC	2008–09	Eredivisie	17	2	1	0	6	0	–		24	2
Twente	2008–09	Eredivisie	17	3	4	0	0	0	–		21	3
Twente	2009–10	Eredivisie	33	1	4	0	12	0	–		49	1
Twente	2010–11	Eredivisie	32	0	5	0	11	1	1	0	49	1
Twente	2011–12	Eredivisie	28	4	2	0	12	0	3	0	45	4
Twente	2012–13	Eredivisie	11	0	1	0	8	1	1	0	21	1
Twente	2013–14	Eredivisie	1	0	0	0	0	0	–		1	0
Jong FC Twente	2013–14	Jupiler League	2	0	2	0						
Career total			407	21	37	3	56	2	16	1	516	27

=== International ===
Appearances and goals by national team and year
National team	Year	Apps	Goals
Netherlands	2010	1	0
Netherlands	2011	1	0
Total		2	0

== Honours ==
Twente

- Eredivisie: 2009–10
- KNVB Cup: 2010–11
- Johan Cruyff Shield: 2010, 2011
