= 2011–12 Roda JC Kerkrade season =

Roda JC Kerkrade
2011–12 season
- Chairman: Gerard Wielaert
- Manager: (Belgium) Harm van Veldhoven
- Stadium: Parkstad Limburg Stadion
- Eredivisie: tbc
- KNVB Cup: tbc
- Top goalscorer: League: Senharib Malki (21); All: Senharib Malki (21)
- Highest home attendance: 13,500
- Lowest home attendance: 12,565
- Average home league attendance: 12,836
Home colours	Away colours

The 2011-12 season will be the 39th season for Roda JC competing in the Dutch Eredivisie. This article will show statistics and list details of all matches played by the club during the season.

== Club ==
=== Team kit ===
Diadora will be supplying the team kits for another season. Accon-avm is the shirt sponsor for the second season on a row.

=== Coaching staff ===
Position	Staff
Manager	(Netherlands) Harm van Veldhoven
Assistant Manager	(Netherlands) Rick Plum
Goalkeeping Coach	(Netherlands) John Roox
Health Coach	(Netherlands) Mark Luijpers

Last updated: 20 September 2011

== Statistics ==
=== Appearances and goals ===
Last updated on 23 October 2011.

No.	Pos	Nat	Player	Total		Eredivisie		KNVB Cup	
No.	Pos	Nat	Player	Apps	Goals	Apps	Goals	Apps	Goals
1	GK	(Poland) POL	Paweł Kieszek	7	0	6+0	0	1+0	0
2	DF	(Belgium) BEL	Martijn Monteyne	11	0	10+0	0	1+0	0
4	DF	(Netherlands) NED	Rob Wielaert	11	1	10+0	0	1+0	1
5	DF	(Serbia) SRB	Jagoš Vuković	4	0	3+0	0	0+1	0
6	MF	(Netherlands) NED	Ruud Vormer	11	4	10+0	3	1+0	1
7	DF	(Denmark) DEN	Sebastian Svärd	0	0	0+0	0	0+0	0
8	MF	(Netherlands) NED	Mark-Jan Fledderus	10	1	8+2	1	0+0	0
9	FW	(Denmark) DEN	Mads Junker	10	1	10+0	1	0+0	0
10	MF	(Belgium) BEL	Davy De Beule	8	1	3+4	0	1+0	1
11	FW	(Morocco) MAR	Adil Ramzi	9	0	7+1	0	0+1	0
12	DF	(Belgium) BEL	Bart Biemans	9	0	7+1	0	1+0	0
14	MF	(Netherlands) NED	Mitchell Donald	11	3	8+2	2	1+0	1
15	DF	(Belgium) BEL	Jimmy Hempte	10	0	9+0	0	1+0	0
16	FW	(Syria) SYR	Senharib Malki	10	6	3+6	6	1+0	0
17	FW	(Poland) POL	Mikołaj Lebedyński	0	0	0+0	0	0+0	0
18	MF	(Cameroon) CMR	Arnaud Sutchuin-Djoum	7	0	4+2	0	1+0	0
20	FW	(Netherlands) NED	Guus Hupperts	0	0	0+0	0	0+0	0
21	GK	(Poland) POL	Mateusz Prus	2	0	2+0	0	0+0	0
23	FW	(Netherlands) NED	Wiljan Pluim	9	2	3+5	0	1+0	2
24	DF	(Netherlands) NED	Leon Broekhof	3	0	1+1	0	0+1	0
26	MF	(Belgium) BEL	Laurent Delorge	8	1	8+0	1	0+0	0
28	MF	(Belgium) BEL	Kenneth Staelens	0	0	0+0	0	0+0	0
29	GK	(Netherlands) NED	Bryan Roox	0	0	0+0	0	0+0	0
Players no longer at the club:
22	GK	(Poland) POL	Przemysław Tytoń	2	0	2+0	0	0+0	0

=== Top scorers ===
Place	Position	Nation	Number	Name	Eredivisie	KNVB Cup	Total
1	FW	(Syria)	16	Senharib Malki	14	0	14
2	MF	(Netherlands)	14	Ruud Vormer	3	1	4
3	MF	(Netherlands)	14	Mitchell Donald	2	1	3
4	FW	(Netherlands)	23	Wiljan Pluim	0	2	2
5	MF	(Netherlands)	8	Mark-Jan Fledderus	1	0	1
5	FW	(Denmark)	9	Mads Junker	1	0	1
5	MF	(Belgium)	26	Laurent Delorge	1	0	1
5	MF	(Belgium)	10	Davy De Beule	0	1	1
5	DF	(Netherlands)	4	Rob Wielaert	0	1	1
				TOTALS	14	6	20

=== Cards ===
Accounts for all competitions. Last updated on 23 October 2011.

No.	Pos.	Name	Yellow card	Red card
1	GK	(Poland) Paweł Kieszek	0	0
2	DF	(Belgium) Martijn Monteyne	1	0
4	DF	(Netherlands) Rob Wielaert	3	0
5	DF	(Serbia) Jagoš Vuković	0	1
6	MF	(Netherlands) Ruud Vormer	3	1
7	DF	(Denmark) Sebastian Svärd	0	0
8	MF	(Netherlands) Mark-Jan Fledderus	1	1
9	FW	(Denmark) Mads Junker	0	0
10	MF	(Belgium) Davy De Beule	0	0
11	FW	(Morocco) Adil Ramzi	0	0
12	DF	(Belgium) Bart Biemans	0	0
14	MF	(Netherlands) Mitchell Donald	2	0
15	DF	(Belgium) Jimmy Hempte	1	0
16	FW	(Syria) Senharib Malki	0	0
17	FW	(Poland) Mikołaj Lebedyński	0	0
18	MF	(Cameroon) Arnaud Sutchuin-Djoum	0	0
20	FW	(Netherlands) Guus Hupperts	0	0
21	GK	(Poland) Mateusz Prus	0	0
23	FW	(Netherlands) Wiljan Pluim	1	0
24	DF	(Netherlands) Leon Broekhof	1	0
26	MF	(Belgium) Laurent Delorge	2	0
28	MF	(Belgium) Kenneth Staelens	0	0
29	GK	(Netherlands) Bryan Roox	0	0

=== Starting formations ===
Accounts for all competitions. Last updated on 23 October 2011.

Formation	League	KNVB Cup	Total
4-3-3	9	1	10

=== Starting XI ===
These are the most used starting players (Eredivisie only) in the most used formation throughout the complete season. Last updated on 23 October 2011.

No.	Pos.	Nat.	Name	MS	Notes
1	GK	(Poland)	Kieszek	6	Prus and Tytoń has 2 starts
2	RB	(Belgium)	Monteyne	10	
12	CB	(Belgium)	Biemans	4	
4	CB	(Netherlands)	Wielaert	4	Jagoš Vuković has 2 starts
15	LB	(Belgium)	Hempte	9	Vuković has 1 start
26	RM	(Belgium)	Delorge	8	Ramzi has 1 start
6	CM	(Netherlands)	Vormer	9	
14	LM	(Netherlands)	Donald		Ramzi and De Beule has 2 start
8	RW	(Netherlands)	Fledderus	7	Ramzi has 2 start
18	CF	(Cameroon)	Sutchuin-Djoum	3	Pluim and Malki has 1 start
9	LW	(Denmark)	Junker	5	Pluim has 3 starts, Ramzi and Malki has 1 start

== Transfers ==
=== In ===
Date	Pos.	Name	From	Fee	Source
2011-02-09	MF	(Netherlands) Mitchell Donald	(Netherlands) Ajax	Free	
2011-02-23	DF	(Belgium) Martijn Monteyne	(Belgium) Germinal Beerschot	Free	
2011-03-01	MF	(Belgium) Davy De Beule	(Belgium) KV Kortrijk	Free	
2011-03-23	MF	(Netherlands) Mark-Jan Fledderus	(Netherlands) Heracles Almelo	Free	
2011-03-31	DF	(Netherlands) Leon Broekhof	(Netherlands) De Graafschap	Free	
2011-05-16	DF	(Netherlands) Rob Wielaert	(Netherlands) Ajax	Free	
2011-06-22	DF	(Netherlands) Bart Biemans	(Netherlands) Willem II	Free	
2011-07-11	FW	(Morocco) Adil Ramzi	(Qatar) Al-Wakrah	Free	
2011-07-19	FW	(Syria) Senharib Malki	(Belgium) KSC Lokeren	Free	

=== Out ===
Date	Pos.	Name	To	Fee	Source
2011-02-09	MF	(Netherlands) Willem Janssen	(Netherlands) Twente	Free	
2011-05-25	DF	(Netherlands) Eelco Horsten	(Netherlands) VV UNA	Free	
2011-06-07	DF	(Norway) Pa-Modou Kah	(Qatar) Al-Khor	Free	
2011-06-17	DF	(Belgium) Davy De Fauw	(Belgium) Zulte Waregem	Undisclosed	
2011-07-01	GK	(Netherlands) Collin van Eijk	(Netherlands) MVV	Free	
2011-07-11	MF	(Netherlands) Rihairo Meulens	(Netherlands) Almere City FC	Free	
2011-07-24	FW	(Netherlands) Anouar Hadouir	(Germany) Alemannia Aachen	Free	
2011-08-26	DF	(North Macedonia) Yani Urdinov	(North Macedonia) Rabotnički	Free	
2011-08-31	MF	(Hungary) Boldizsár Bodor	(Greece) OFI Crete	Free	

=== Loans in ===
Date	Pos.	Name	From	Expiry	Source
2011-06-24	DF	(Serbia) Jagoš Vuković	(Netherlands) PSV	Loan	
2011-08-17	FW	(Poland) Mikołaj Lebedyński	(Poland) Pogoń Szczecin	Loan	
2011-08-31	GK	(Poland) Paweł Kieszek	(Portugal) Porto	Loan	

=== Loans out ===
Date	Pos.	Name	To	Until	Source
2011-07-29	FW	(North Macedonia) Aleksandar Stankov	(Netherlands) Oss	Loan	
2011-07-29	MF	(North Macedonia) Antonio Stankov	(Netherlands) Oss	Loan	
2011-08-03	MF	(Bosnia and Herzegovina) Adnan Sečerović	(Netherlands) Fortuna Sittard	Loan	
2011-08-16	GK	(Poland) Przemysław Tytoń	(Netherlands) PSV	Loan	

== Competitions ==
Win Draw Loss Void

=== Pre-season ===
2 July 2011	KVC Oranje	0–9	Roda JC	Kerkrade
18:00 UTC+01:00		Report	Staelens 08'; Pluim 20', 45', 77'; Junker 25'; Broekhof 37'; Van der Meulen 51'; Ramzi 68'; Vuković 79'	Stadium: Sportpark Bleijerheide; Attendance: 1,500

5 July 2011	RKSV Nemelaer	0–8	Roda JC	Haaren
18:00 UTC+01:00		Report	Broekhof 24'; Ramzi 26', 29', 90'; Staelens 33'; Sutchuin 37'; Fledderus 49'; Hupperts 78'	Stadium: Sportpark De Walzaad

9 July 2011	SV Heerlen/IDB	1–9	Roda JC	Heerlen
18:00 UTC+01:00	Doorneveld 21'	Report	Vormer 26', 56', 81' (pen.); Junker 31'; De Beule 36'; Sutchuin 46'; Lebedyński 66'; Ramzi 72', 85'	Stadium: Sportpark Grasbroek

16 July 2011	Weerter Selectie	0–8	Roda JC	Weert
18:00 UTC+01:00		Report	Ramzi 12'; Fledderus 25'; Malki 55', 57'; Sutchuin 63', 87'; Broekhof 65'; De Beule 73'	Stadium: Sportpark De Koekoek

19 July 2011	FC Eindhoven	0–1	Roda JC	Eindhoven
19:00 UTC+01:00		Report	Ramzi 47'	Stadium: Jan Louwers Stadion

23 July 2011	Roda JC	2–2	(Belgium) Club Brugge	Kerkrade
19:00 UTC+01:00	Vormer 34' (pen.); De Beule 85'	Report	Refaelov 69'; Vleminckx 89'	Stadium: Parkstad Limburg Stadion; Attendance: 4,000; Referee: Reinold Wiedemeijer

26 July 2011	RKSV Groene Ster	0–4	Roda JC	Heerlen
19:00 UTC+01:00		Report	Malki 6', 51'; Vormer 73'; Junker 73'	Stadium: Sportpark Pronsebroek; Attendance: 2,000

29 July 2011	Roda JC	1–2	(Spain) Málaga	Kerkrade
19:30 UTC+01:00	Vuković 52'	Report	Baptista 27' (pen.); Buonanotte 90'	Stadium: Parkstad Limburg Stadion; Attendance: 5,300

=== Eredivisie ===
==== League table ====
Pos	Team	Pld	W	D	L	GF	GA	GD	Pts	Qualification or relegation
8	NEC	34	13	6	15	42	45	−3	45	Qualification to European competition play-offs (Note: PSV qualified for the play-off round of the 2012–13 UEFA Europa League after winning the 2011–12 KNVB Cup. As they finished third in the league, all Europa League berths and play-off places were moved down one spot from the original scheme.)
9	RKC Waalwijk	34	13	6	15	40	49	−9	45	Qualification to European competition play-offs
10	Roda JC	34	14	2	18	55	70	−15	44	
11	Utrecht	34	11	10	13	55	58	−3	43	
12	Heracles	34	11	7	16	52	62	−10	40	

Source: Eredivisie (official site) (in Dutch)
Rules for classification: 1) points; 2) goal difference; 3) number of goals scored.

==== Results summary ====
Round	1	2	3	4	5	6	7	8	9	10	11	12	13	14	15	16	17	18	19	20	21	22	23	24	25	26	27	28	29	30	31	32	33	34
Ground	H	A	H	A	H	A	A	H	H	A	H	H	A	H	A	A	H	A	H	A	H	A	H	A	H	A	H	A	H	A	A	H	A	H
Result	W	L	L	L	W	L	L	W	W	L	L	L	W	W	W	L	W	D	W	L	W	L	L	L	W	L	W	L	D	W	W	L	L	L
Position	4	10	11	13 October 2013	15	13 December 2013	13	13	9	9	9	9	9	9	9	9	9	9	9	9	9	9	9	9	9	9	9	9	9	10				

Updated to match(es) played on 6 May 2012. Source: Fixtures and Results
A = Away; H = Home; W = Win; D = Draw; L = Loss

==== Matches ====
6 August 2011 1	Roda JC	2–1	Groningen	Kerkrade
18:45 UTC+01:00	Fledderus 77'; Malki 88'	Report	Bacuna 13'	Stadium: Parkstad Limburg Stadion; Attendance: 12,650; Referee: Jan Wegereef

13 August 2011 2	Feyenoord	3–0	Roda JC	Rotterdam
20:45 UTC+01:00	Cabral 12', 54'; Fer 48'	Report		Stadium: Stadion Feijenoord; Attendance: 40,000; Referee: Björn Kuipers

19 August 2011 3	Roda JC	0–2	RKC Waalwijk	Kerkrade
20:00 UTC+01:00		Report	Van Peppen 48'; Castillion 83'	Stadium: Parkstad Limburg Stadion; Attendance: 12,565; Referee: Jack van Hulten

27 August 2011 4	Utrecht	3–1	Roda JC	Utrecht
20:45 UTC+01:00	Oar 44'; Sneijder 60'; Mulenga 73'	Report	Junker 83'	Stadium: Stadion Galgenwaard; Attendance: 20,000; Referee: Ruud Bossen

10 September 2011 5	Roda JC	2–1	Twente	Kerkrade
18:45 UTC+01:00	Vormer 36'; Donald 47'	Report	Janko 35'	Stadium: Parkstad Limburg Stadion; Attendance: 13,500; Referee: Richard Liesveld

17 September 2011 6	Vitesse	5–0	Roda JC	Arnhem
19:45 UTC+01:00	Van Ginkel 55'; Kashia 71'; Chanturia 73'; Büttner 77' (pen.); Jenner 82'	Report		Stadium: GelreDome; Attendance: 14,982; Referee: Tom van Sichem

24 September 2011 7	PSV	7–1	Roda JC	Eindhoven
18:45 UTC+01:00	Toivonen 15'; Mertens 20', 33', 58', 89'; Strootman 34'; Matavž 83'	Report	Malki 57'	Stadium: Philips Stadion; Attendance: 33,000; Referee: Reinold Wiedemeijer

1 October 2011 8	Roda JC	4–3	NAC Breda	Kerkrade
20:45 UTC+01:00	Malki 10', 36'; Delorge 27'; Vormer 63'	Report	Bayram 31'; Gudelj 54'; Schalk 80'	Stadium: Parkstad Limburg Stadion; Attendance: 12,630; Referee: Eric Braamhaar

16 October 2011 9	Roda JC	4–1	ADO Den Haag	Kerkrade
14:30 UTC+01:00	Malki 15', 78'; Donald 63'; Vormer 90+1'	Report	Chery 1'	Stadium: Parkstad Limburg Stadion; Attendance: 13,030; Referee: Ruud Bossen

23 October 2011 10	AZ	1–0	Roda JC	Alkmaar
14:30 UTC+01:00	Elm 51'	Report		Stadium: AFAS Stadion; Attendance: 16,200; Referee: Danny Makkelie

29 October 2011 11	Roda JC	0–4	Ajax	Kerkrade
18:45 UTC+01:00			Eriksen 7'; Janssen 50'; Lukoki 57'; Ebecilio 85'	Stadium: Parkstad Limburg Stadion; Attendance: 18,400; Referee: Reinold Wiedemeijer

5 November 2011 12	Roda JC	1–2	Heerenveen	Kerkrade
18:45 UTC+01:00	Vuković 55'		Assaidi 42'; Đuričić 49'	Stadium: Parkstad Limburg Stadion; Attendance: 12,890; Referee: Christof Dierick

19 November 2011 13	NEC	1–2	Roda JC	Nijmegen
18:45 UTC+01:00	Platje 76'		Malki 53'; Pluim 75'	Stadium: Goffertstadion; Attendance: 12,200; Referee: Jeroen Sanders

26 November 2011 14	Roda JC	3–1	Heracles	Kerkrade
18:45 UTC+01:00	Ramzi (yellow card) 12'; Wielaert (yellow card) 37'; Junker 66', 68'; Biemans (yellow card) 75'; Senharib Malki 77'	Summary	Vejinović (yellow card) 22'; Overtoom 76' (pen.)	Stadium: Parkstad Limburg Stadion; Attendance: 12,846; Referee: Maarten Ketting

3 December 2011 15	De Graafschap	1–2	Roda JC	Doetinchem
18:45 UTC+01:00	Rose 82'	Summary	Malki 46'; Ramzi 65'	Stadium: De Vijverberg; Attendance: 11,627; Referee: Dennis Higler

11 December 2011 16	VVV	2–0	Roda JC	Venlo
11:30 UTC+01:00	Cullen (yellow card) 38'; Maguire 45+1' (pen.); Linssen (yellow card) 65', (goal) 83'; Fleuren (yellow card) 64'	Summary	Kieszek (red card) 43'; Malki (yellow card) 52'	Stadium: De Koel; Attendance: 7,650; Referee: Björn Kuipers

17 December 2011 17	Roda JC	7–0	Excelsior	Kerkrade
18:45 UTC+01:00	Vuković 5'; De Beule 28'; Vormer 35'; Sutchuin 79', 84'; Donald 82'; Lebedyński 88'	Summary		Stadium: Parkstad Limburg Stadion; Attendance: 13,834; Referee: Tom van Sichem

20 January 2012 18	ADO Den Haag	3–3	Roda JC	The Hague
19:00 UTC+01:00	Verhoek 3'; Vicento 24', 58'; Kum (yellow card) 85'; Supusepa (yellow card) 90+2'	Summary	Junker 15'; Malki 48', 82'	Stadium: Kyocera Stadion; Attendance: 14,003; Referee: Reinold Wiedemeijer

28 January 2012 19	Roda JC	2–0	AZ	Kerkrade
19:45 UTC+01:00	Malki 10'; Junker 33'; Vuković (yellow card) 36'; Wielaert (yellow card) 52'	Summary	Moisander (yellow card) 65'; Altidore (yellow card) 80'	Stadium: Parkstad Limburg Stadion; Attendance: 14,655; Referee: Serdar Gözübüyük

3 February 2012 20	Heerenveen	4–3	Roda JC	Heerenveen
19:00 UTC+01:00	Dost 5', 70'; Janmaat 16'; Sibon 63'	Summary	Malki 9', 44'; Junker (yellow card) 37'; De Beule 51', (yellow card) 57'	Stadium: Abe Lenstra Stadion; Attendance: 23,000; Referee: Jeroen Sanders

11 February 2012 21	Roda JC	1–0	NEC	Kerkrade
18:45 UTC+01:00	Malki 56'	Summary		Stadium: Parkstad Limburg Stadion; Attendance: 12,088; Referee: Ed Janssen

18 February 2012 22	Heracles	2–1	Roda JC	Almelo
19:45 UTC+01:00	Everton 65'; Duarte (yellow card) 71'; Overtoom 78' (pen.); Belterman (yellow card) 90+1'	Summary	Malki 40'; Kieszek (red card) 75'; Monteyne (yellow card) 90'	Stadium: Polman Stadion; Attendance: 8,431; Referee: Wim Smet

25 February 2012 23	Roda JC	0–2	De Graafschap	Kerkrade
18:45 UTC+01:00	Vuković (yellow card) 34'; Vormer (yellow card) 40'; De Beule (yellow card) 44'	Summary	Poepon 26'; El Hassnaoui (yellow card) 85', (goal) 90+1'	Stadium: Parkstad Limburg Stadion; Attendance: 13,358; Referee: Jochem Kamphuis

4 March 2012 24	Ajax	4–1	Roda JC	Amsterdam
13:30 UTC+01:00	Ebecilio 67', 89', 90+3'; Anita 78'	Summary	Malki (yellow card) 35', (goal) 40'; Donald (yellow card) 73'	Stadium: Amsterdam Arena; Attendance: 50,939; Referee: Richard Liesveld

9 March 2012 25	Roda JC	3–1	VVV	Kerkrade
19:00 UTC+01:00	Malki 51', 86' (pen.); De Beule 60'	Summary	Yoshida 39', (red card) 73'; De Regt (yellow card) 75'	Stadium: Parkstad Limburg Stadion; Attendance: 16,333; Referee: Bjorn Kuipers

17 March 2012 26	Excelsior	2–1	Roda JC	Rotterdam
18:45 UTC+01:00	Janga 5'; Alberg (yellow card) 25'; Vuković 90+2' (o.g.)	Summary	Hempte (yellow card) 43'; Ramzi (yellow card) 60'; Malki 90+5'	Stadium: Stadion Woudestein; Attendance: 3,531; Referee: Maarten Ketting

24 March 2012 27	Roda JC	3–1	Vitesse	Kerkrade
17:45 UTC+01:00	Malki 25', (yellow card) 80'; De Beule 37'; Junker 49'	Summary	Pröpper 38'	Stadium: Parkstad Limburg Stadion; Attendance: 15,340; Referee: Jan Wegereef

31 March 2012 28	Twente	2–0	Roda JC	Enschede
18:45 UTC+01:00	Janssen (yellow card) 14'; Brama (yellow card) 31'; Fer (yellow card) 44'; Douglas 55'; Verhoek 83'	Summary	Ramzi (yellow card) 24'; Malki (yellow card) 44'	Stadium: De Grolsch Veste; Attendance: 29,750; Referee: Pol van Boekel

11 April 2012 29	Roda JC	0–0	Feyenoord	Kerkrade
19:00 UTC+01:00	Ramzi (yellow card) 53'	Summary	Schaken (yellow card) 13'	Stadium: Parkstad Limburg Stadion; Attendance: 17,029; Referee: Richard Liesveld

15 April 2012 30	Groningen	0–1	Roda JC	Groningen
11:30 UTC+01:00	Hiariej (yellow card) 42'; Van de Laak (yellow card) 64'; Ivans (yellow card) 84'	Summary	Wielaert 35'; Delorge (yellow card) 59'; Biemans (yellow card) 66'; Vormer (yellow card) 82'	Stadium: Euroborg; Attendance: 21,931; Referee: Ed Janssen

20 April 2012 31	NAC Breda	0–3	Roda JC	Breda
20:00 UTC+01:00	Koenders (yellow card) 24'	Summary	Malki 58'; Donald 75'; Vormer 90'	Stadium: Rat Verlegh Stadion; Attendance: 18,300; Referee: Bjorn Kuipers

29 April 2012 32	Roda JC	1–3	PSV	Kerkrade
12:30 UTC+01:00	Malki 65'; Vormer (yellow card) 79'; Kieszek (red card) 81'; Sutchuin (yellow card) 90'	Summary	Mertens 7'; Marcelo 31' (yellow card) 79'; Toivonen (yellow card) 57'; Lens (yellow card) 76'; Wijnaldum (yellow card) 79'; Depay 84'	Stadium: Parkstad Limburg Stadion; Attendance: 17,106; Referee: Bas Nijhuis

2 May 2012 33	RKC Waalwijk	5–2	Roda JC	Waalwijk
20:00 UTC+01:00	Sno 4', 77'; Ten Voorde 19'; Meijers 39', 45+1'	Summary	Junker 38'; Malki 75'	Stadium: Mandemakers Stadion; Attendance: 6,000; Referee: Pieter Vink

6 May 2012 34	Roda JC	1–3	Utrecht	Kerkrade
14:30 UTC+01:00	Malki 60'; Wielaert (yellow card) 61'; Donald (yellow card) 85'	Summary	Takagi (yellow card) 42', (goal) 49'; Gerndt 45'; Duplan (yellow card) 60'; Demouge 86'	Stadium: Parkstad Limburg Stadion; Attendance: 14,651; Referee: Kevin Blom

=== KNVB Cup ===
Round	2	3
Ground	A	H
Result	W	L

20 September 2011 Round 2	VV Bennekom	1–6	Roda JC	Bennekom
20:00 UTC+01:00	Sissing 70'	Report	Pluim 8', 40'; De Beule 30'; Donald 41'; Vormer 53'; Wielaert 64'	Stadium: Eikelhof; Attendance: 1.200; Referee: R. Honing

26 October 2011 Round 3	Roda JC	2–4	Ajax	Kerkrade
20:45 UTC+01:00	Donald 4'; Ramzi (yellow card) 38'; Wielaert (yellow card) 55'; Vuković (yellow card) 60'; Junker 64'; Malki (yellow card) 76'	Summary	Vertonghen 5', 89', (yellow card) 60'; Ooijer (yellow card) 38'; Boerrigter 63', 73'	Stadium: Parkstad Limburg Stadion; Attendance: 14,630; Referee: Jan Wegereef
