= 2009–10 Eredivisie =

54th season of the Eredivisie

Eredivisie
- Season: 2009–10
- Dates: 31 July 2009 – 16 May 2010
- Champions: FC Twente; 1st title
- Relegated: RKC Waalwijk; Sparta Rotterdam
- Champions League: FC Twente; Ajax
- Europa League: PSV; Feyenoord; AZ; Utrecht (via play-offs)
- Matches: 306
- Goals: 892 (2.92 per match)
- Top goalscorer: Luis Suárez (35)
- Biggest home win: Ajax 7–0 VVV Venlo (11 April 2010)
- Biggest away win: RKC 0–6 AZ (15 August 2009)
- Highest scoring: AZ 6–2 RKC (13 March 2010); Feyenoord 6–2 Heerenveen (2 May 2010)

The 2009–10 Eredivisie was the 54th season of Eredivisie since its establishment in 1955. AZ were the reigning champions. A total of 18 teams is taking part in the league, consisting of 16 who competed in the previous season and two promoted from the Eerste Divisie. The teams promoted from the Eerste Divisie at the end of the previous season were champions VVV-Venlo and promotion/relegation play-off winners RKC Waalwijk.

The season started on 31 July 2009 and ended on 2 May 2010. FC Twente won their first ever Eredivisie title.

As of 2025, this is the last time that none of the big three Dutch teams have won the title.

== Overview ==
=== Teams and stadia ===
Locations of the 2009–10 Eredivisie teams
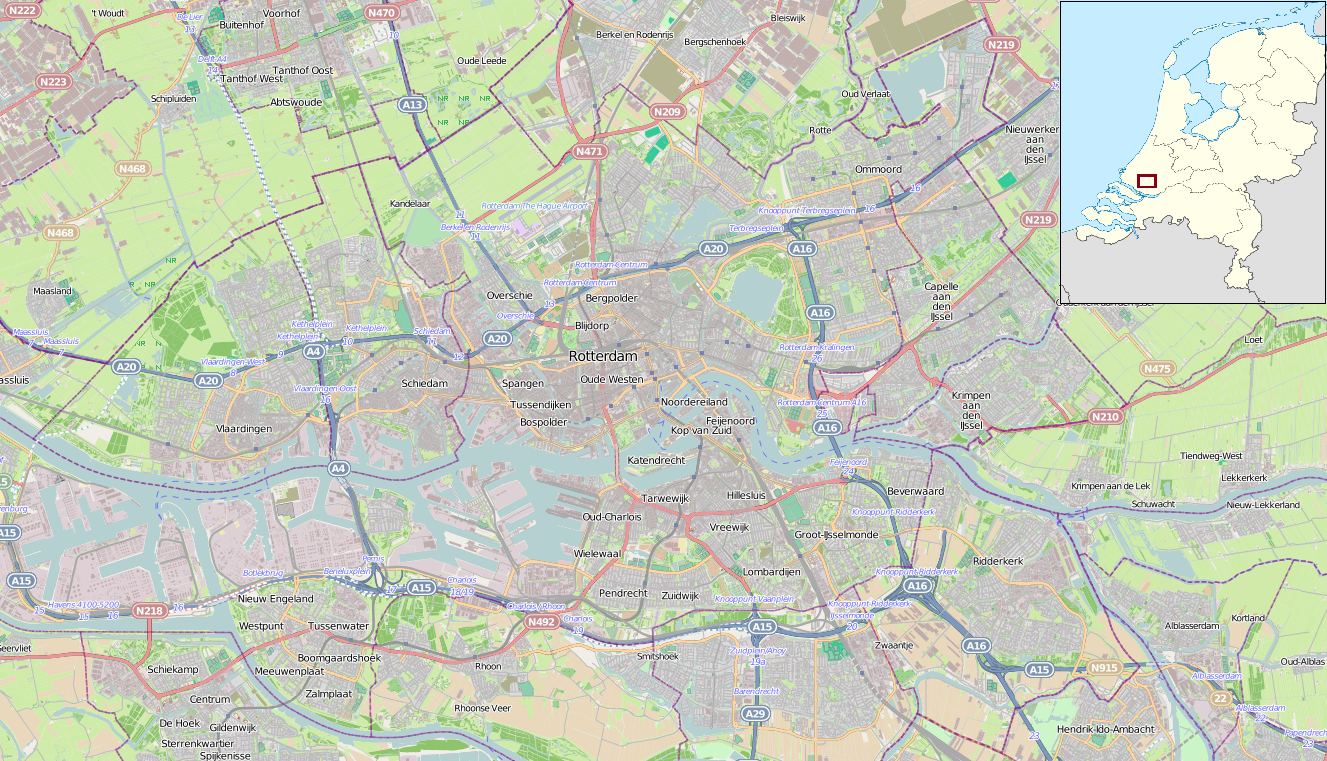
Rotterdam Eredivisie football clubs

Club	Location	Venue	Capacity
ADO Den Haag	The Hague	Den Haag Stadion	15,000
Ajax	Amsterdam	Amsterdam ArenA	51,715
AZ	Alkmaar	AZ Stadion	17,023
Feyenoord	Rotterdam	Stadion Feijenoord	51,177
Groningen	Groningen	Euroborg	22,329
Heerenveen	Heerenveen	Abe Lenstra Stadion	26,000
Heracles Almelo	Almelo	Polman Stadion	8,500
NAC Breda	Breda	Rat Verlegh Stadion	19,000
NEC	Nijmegen	Stadion de Goffert	12,470
PSV	Eindhoven	Philips Stadion	35,119
RKC	Waalwijk	Mandemakers Stadion	7,500
Roda JC	Kerkrade	Parkstad Limburg Stadion	19,979
Sparta Rotterdam	Rotterdam	Het Kasteel	11,026
Twente	Enschede	De Grolsch Veste	30,205
Utrecht	Utrecht	Stadion Galgenwaard	24,426
Vitesse Arnhem	Arnhem	Gelredome	25,000
VVV-Venlo	Venlo	De Koel	7,500
Willem II	Tilburg	Koning Willem II Stadion	14,637

=== Personnel and sponsoring ===
Club	Manager	Kit maker	Shirt sponsor
ADO Den Haag	(Netherlands) Raymond Atteveld	Hummel	Fit For Free
Ajax	(Netherlands) Martin Jol	Adidas	Aegon
AZ	(Netherlands) Dick Advocaat	Quick	BUKO
Feyenoord	(Netherlands) Mario Been	Puma	ASR Verzekeringen
Groningen	(Netherlands) Ron Jans	Klupp	Noord Lease
Heerenveen	(Netherlands) Jan Everse	Jako	Univé
Heracles Almelo	(Netherlands) Gertjan Verbeek	Jako	Ten Cate
NAC Breda	(Netherlands) Robert Maaskant	Klupp	Sunweb Vakanties
NEC	(Netherlands) Wiljan Vloet	Nike	Curaçao
PSV	(Netherlands) Fred Rutten	Nike	Philips
RKC	(Netherlands) Ruud Brood	Nike	Mandemakers Keukens
Roda JC	(Belgium) Harm Van Veldhoven	Diadora	Aevitae
Sparta Rotterdam	(Netherlands) Frans Adelaar	Patrick	Graydon
Twente	(England) Steve McClaren	Diadora	Arke
Utrecht	(Netherlands) Ton du Chatinier	Kappa	Phanos
Vitesse Arnhem	(Netherlands) Theo Bos	Klupp	AfAB
VVV-Venlo	(Netherlands) Jan van Dijk	Erima	Seacon Logistics
Willem II	(Netherlands) Arno Pijpers	Masita	Destil

=== Managerial changes ===
Team	Outgoing manager	Manner of departure	Date of vacancy	Replaced by	Date of appointment
Ajax	(Netherlands) Marco van Basten	Resigned	Pre-season	(Netherlands) Martin Jol	25 May 2009
AZ	(Netherlands) Louis van Gaal	Signed by Bayern Munich	Pre-season	(Netherlands) Ronald Koeman	17 May 2009
AZ	(Netherlands) Ronald Koeman	Sacked	5 December 2009	(Netherlands) Dick Advocaat	8 December 2009
Heerenveen	(Norway) Trond Sollied	Sacked	1 September 2009	(Netherlands) Jan de Jonge	2 September 2009
Heerenveen	(Netherlands) Jan de Jonge	Resigned		(Netherlands) Jan Everse	
Heracles Almelo	(Netherlands) Gert Heerkes	Resigned	Pre-season	(Netherlands) Gertjan Verbeek	8 June 2009
NEC	(Netherlands) Mario Been	Signed by Feyenoord	Pre-season	(Netherlands) Dwight Lodeweges	9 April 2009
NEC	(Netherlands) Dwight Lodeweges	Resigned	27 October 2009	(Netherlands) Wiljan Vloet	14 November 2009
PSV	(Netherlands) Dwight Lodeweges	Signed by NEC	Pre-season	(Netherlands) Fred Rutten	17 April 2009
Sparta Rotterdam	(Netherlands) Foeke Booy	Signed by Utrecht	Pre-season	(Netherlands) Frans Adelaar	15 May 2009
Sparta Rotterdam	(Netherlands) Frans Adelaar	Sacked		(Netherlands) Aad de Mos	
ADO Den Haag	(Netherlands) Raymond Atteveld	Sacked		(Netherlands) Maurice Steijn	30 March 2010
Willem II	(Netherlands) Alfons Groenendijk	Sacked		(Netherlands) Arno Pijpers	27 February 2010
Willem II	(Netherlands) Arno Pijpers	Resigned		(Netherlands) Theo de Jong	

== League table ==
Pos	Team	Pld	W	D	L	GF	GA	GD	Pts	Qualification or relegation
1	Twente (C)	34	27	5	2	63	23	+40	86	Qualification to Champions League group stage
2	Ajax	34	27	4	3	106	20	+86	85	Qualification to Champions League third qualifying round
3	PSV	34	23	9	2	72	29	+43	78	Qualification to Europa League play-off round
4	Feyenoord	34	17	12	5	54	31	+23	63	Qualification to Europa League play-off round
5	AZ	34	19	5	10	64	34	+30	62	Qualification to Europa League third qualifying round
6	Heracles	34	17	5	12	54	49	+5	56	Qualification to European competition play-offs
7	Utrecht (O)	34	14	11	9	39	33	+6	53	Qualification to European competition play-offs
8	Groningen	34	14	7	13	48	47	+1	49	Qualification to European competition play-offs
9	Roda JC	34	14	5	15	56	60	−4	47	Qualification to European competition play-offs
10	NAC Breda	34	12	10	12	42	49	−7	46	
11	Heerenveen	34	11	4	19	44	64	−20	37	
12	VVV-Venlo	34	8	11	15	43	57	−14	35	
13	NEC	34	8	9	17	35	59	−24	33	
14	Vitesse Arnhem	34	8	8	18	38	62	−24	32	
15	ADO Den Haag	34	7	9	18	38	59	−21	30	
16	Sparta Rotterdam (R)	34	6	8	20	30	66	−36	26	Qualification to relegation play-offs
17	Willem II (O)	34	7	2	25	36	70	−34	23	Qualification to relegation play-offs
18	RKC Waalwijk (R)	34	5	0	29	30	80	−50	15	Relegation to the Eerste Divisie

Source: eredivsie.nl (in Dutch)
Rules for classification: 1) points; 2) goal difference; 3) number of goals scored.
(C) Champions; (O) Play-off winners; (R) Relegated

== Results ==
Home \ Away	ADO	AJX	AZ	FEY	GRO	HEE	HER	NAC	NEC	PSV	RKC	RJC	SPA	TWE	UTR	VIT	VVV	WIL
ADO Den Haag		0–1	2–1	0–2	1–1	2–1	1–4	1–2	2–3	1–5	4–0	1–2	2–3	0–1	0–1	1–1	0–0	3–0
Ajax	3–0		1–0	5–1	3–0	5–1	4–0	6–0	3–0	4–1	4–1	4–0	0–0	3–0	4–0	4–0	7–0	4–0
AZ	3–0	2–4		1–1	0–1	4–1	3–2	1–0	0–1	1–1	6–2	2–0	2–0	1–0	2–0	1–2	2–0	2–1
Feyenoord	2–2	1–1	1–2		3–1	6–2	1–1	0–0	2–0	1–3	3–0	4–0	3–0	1–1	0–0	2–1	1–0	1–0
Groningen	2–0	0–2	0–1	2–3		2–0	4–1	1–2	2–2	0–2	2–1	1–0	3–1	0–0	0–0	1–0	1–0	4–0
Heerenveen	3–0	0–2	0–2	0–2	0–1		1–2	0–0	4–1	2–2	3–1	0–0	4–1	0–2	2–0	1–0	1–1	4–2
Heracles	4–2	0–3	3–2	0–1	4–3	3–1		3–0	2–0	0–1	4–1	3–2	1–1	1–3	3–1	1–2	1–0	3–2
NAC Breda	3–0	1–1	1–1	0–2	0–3	2–0	0–0		3–3	2–1	1–0	1–0	2–2	0–2	0–2	4–0	2–0	4–0
NEC	1–1	1–4	0–0	0–0	0–2	4–1	0–2	4–2		0–4	0–1	0–2	1–0	3–4	1–1	2–1	1–1	2–1
PSV Eindhoven	2–0	4–3	1–0	0–0	3–1	1–0	4–0	3–1	3–0		5–1	3–0	1–1	1–1	2–1	1–0	3–3	3–1
RKC Waalwijk	0–2	1–5	0–6	0–1	3–1	1–2	0–1	0–1	0–1	0–2		4–1	4–1	0–1	0–1	4–1	1–2	0–1
Roda JC	1–1	2–2	2–4	2–4	1–1	4–2	2–1	2–0	1–0	0–1	5–1		2–1	1–2	2–0	3–4	4–2	3–2
Sparta Rotterdam	0–0	0–3	0–1	2–1	2–4	0–2	1–1	2–2	2–0	2–3	1–0	1–2		0–2	0–3	1–1	2–0	2–1
Twente	3–1	1–0	3–2	2–0	4–0	2–0	2–0	3–1	2–1	1–1	2–1	2–0	3–0		3–2	1–0	2–1	1–0
Utrecht	0–2	2–0	1–0	0–0	1–1	2–3	0–0	3–1	1–0	0–0	2–0	2–1	2–0	0–0		2–2	2–2	1–0
Vitesse Arnhem	1–3	1–5	0–3	0–0	3–0	0–1	0–2	1–1	2–2	0–0	3–1	2–5	2–0	1–2	2–2		2–0	2–1
VVV-Venlo	2–2	0–4	3–3	1–1	2–2	3–1	1–0	1–1	2–0	2–4	3–0	1–1	5–0	0–2	0–1	2–0		2–1
Willem II	1–1	0–2	0–3	2–3	2–1	4–1	0–1	1–2	1–1	0–1	2–1	1–3	3–1	1–3	0–3	3–1	2–1	

Source: news.bbc.co.uk
Legend: Blue = home team win; Yellow = draw; Red = away team win.

== Goalscorers ==
Including games played on 2 May 2010; Source: Yahoo Sport, ESPN Soccernet, Soccerway, Eredivisie (official site) (in Dutch)

=== Top scorers ===
Pos.	Player	Club	Goals
1	(Uruguay) Luis Suárez	Ajax	35
2	(Costa Rica) Bryan Ruiz	Twente	24
3	(Denmark) Mads Junker	Roda JC	21
4	(Morocco) Mounir El Hamdaoui	AZ	20
5	(Serbia) Marko Pantelić	Ajax	16
6	(Netherlands) Bas Dost	Heracles	14
6	(Brazil) Everton	Heracles	14
6	(Hungary) Balázs Dzsudzsák	PSV	14
9	(Slovenia) Tim Matavž	Groningen	13
9	(Sweden) Ola Toivonen	PSV	13
11	2 players		12
13	4 players		11
17	4 players		10
21	2 players		9
23	4 players		8
27	10 players		7
37	10 players		6
47	14 players		5
60	23 players		4
84	22 players		3
106	50 players		2
156	71 players		1
Own goals			23
Total:			892
Games:			306
Average:			2.92

=== Other scorers ===
12 goals

- (Netherlands) Jeremain Lens (AZ)
- (Switzerland) Blaise Nkufo (Twente)

11 goals

- (Denmark) Jon Dahl Tomasson (Feyenoord)
- (Netherlands) Gerald Sibon (Heerenveen)
- (Netherlands) Otman Bakkal (PSV)
- (Netherlands) Danny Koevermans (PSV)

10 goals

- (Netherlands) Siem de Jong (Ajax)
- (Netherlands) Erik Falkenburg (Sparta)
- (Netherlands) Rydell Poepon (Sparta)
- (Slovakia) Miroslav Stoch (Twente)

9 goals

- (Ghana) Matthew Amoah (NAC)
- (Netherlands) Sandro Calabro (VVV)

8 goals

- (Netherlands) Willie Overtoom (Heracles)
- (Belgium) Bjorn Vleminckx (NEC)
- (Netherlands) Willem Janssen (Roda JC)
- (Zambia) Jacob Mulenga (Utrecht)

7 goals

- (Netherlands) Wesley Verhoek (ADO)
- (Netherlands) Demy de Zeeuw (Ajax)
- (Netherlands) Roy Makaay (Feyenoord)
- (Czech Republic) Michal Papadopulos (Heerenveen)
- (Netherlands) Anthony Lurling (NAC)
- (Netherlands) Derk Boerrigter (RKC)
- (Netherlands) Ricky van Wolfswinkel (Utrecht)
- (Netherlands) Santi Kolk (Vitesse Arnhem)
- (Sweden) Lasse Nilsson (Vitesse Arnhem)
- (Netherlands) Frank Demouge (Willem II)

6 goals

- (Denmark) Dennis Rommedahl (Ajax)
- (Netherlands) Gregory van der Wiel (Ajax)
- (Denmark) Thomas Enevoldsen (Groningen)
- (Sweden) Andreas Granqvist (Groningen)
- (Netherlands) Edwin de Graaf (NAC)
- (Netherlands) Kees Kwakman (NAC)
- (Netherlands Antilles) Charlison Benschop (RKC)
- (Belgium) Dries Mertens (Utrecht)
- (Japan) Keisuke Honda (VVV)
- (Morocco) Saïd Boutahar (Willem II)

5 goals

- (Netherlands) Urby Emanuelson (Ajax)
- (Australia) Brett Holman (AZ)
- (Belgium) Maarten Martens (AZ)
- (Ivory Coast) Sekou Cissé (Feyenoord)
- (Netherlands) Koen van de Laak (Groningen)
- (Denmark) Nicklas Pedersen (Groningen)
- (Sweden) Viktor Elm (Heerenveen)
- (Netherlands) Darl Douglas (Heracles)
- (Burundi) Saidi Ntibazonkiza (NEC)
- (Serbia) Danko Lazović (PSV)
- (Hungary) Boldizsár Bodor (Roda JC)
- (Denmark) Kenneth Perez (Twente)
- (Mexico) Héctor Moreno (AZ)
- (Belgium) Christophe Grégoire (Willem II)

4 goals

- (Netherlands) Danny Buijs (ADO)
- (Montenegro) Bogdan Milić (ADO)
- (France) Karim Soltani (ADO)
- (Argentina) Darío Cvitanich (Ajax)
- (Belgium) Mousa Dembélé (AZ)
- (Netherlands) Andwélé Slory (Feyenoord)
- (Netherlands) Ron Vlaar (Feyenoord)
- (Netherlands) Georginio Wijnaldum (Feyenoord)
- (Netherlands) Roy Beerens (Heerenveen)
- (Argentina) Hernán Losada (Heerenveen)
- (Brazil) Leonardo Santiago (NAC)
- (Netherlands) Ramon Zomer (NEC)
- (Netherlands) Ibrahim Afellay (PSV)
- (Netherlands) Fred Benson (RKC)
- (Belgium) Benjamin De Ceulaer (RKC)
- (Denmark) Morten Skoubo (Roda JC)
- (Czech Republic) Jacob Lensky (Utrecht)
- (Brazil) Claudemir (Vitesse Arnhem)
- (Belgium) Onur Kaya (Vitesse Arnhem)
- (Netherlands) Adil Auassar (VVV)
- (Netherlands) Ruud Boymans (VVV)
- (Netherlands) Stefan Nijland (Willem II)
- (Netherlands) Sergio Zijler (Willem II)

3 goals

- (Netherlands) Ricky van den Bergh (ADO)
- (Morocco) Ismaïl Aissati (Ajax)
- (Belgium) Jan Vertonghen (Ajax)
- (Sweden) Rasmus Elm (AZ)
- (Brazil) André Bahia (Feyenoord)
- (Netherlands) Jonathan de Guzmán (Feyenoord)
- (Nigeria) Oluwafemi Ajilore (Groningen)
- (Netherlands) Michel Breuer (Heerenveen)
- (Brazil) Paulo Henrique (Heerenveen)
- (Sweden) Samuel Armenteros (Heracles)
- (Netherlands) Marko Vejinović (Heracles)
- (Sweden) Erton Fejzullahu (NEC)
- (Netherlands) John Goossens (NEC)
- (Morocco) Nordin Amrabat (PSV)
- (Brazil) Jonathan Reis (PSV)
- (Netherlands) Fouad Idabdelhay (RKC)
- (Netherlands) Anouar Hadouir (Roda JC)
- (Belgium) Jeanvion Yulu-Matondo (Roda JC)
- (Slovenia) Dalibor Stevanovič (Vitesse Arnhem)
- (Netherlands) Ahmed Ahahaoui (VVV)
- (Spain) Gonzalo García (VVV)
- (Netherlands) Ruben Schaken (VVV)

2 goals

- (Netherlands) Timothy Derijck (ADO)
- (Slovakia) Csaba Horváth (ADO)
- (Netherlands) Kees Luijckx (ADO)
- (Belgium) Toby Alderweireld (Ajax)
- (Sweden) Kennedy Bakircioglu (Ajax)
- (Netherlands) Mitchell Donald (Ajax – 1/Willem II – 1)
- (Serbia) Miralem Sulejmani (Ajax)
- (Italy) Graziano Pellè (AZ)
- (Netherlands) Luigi Bruins (Feyenoord)
- (Netherlands) Leroy Fer (Feyenoord)
- (Netherlands) Denny Landzaat (Feyenoord)
- (Netherlands) Leandro Bacuna (Groningen)
- (Netherlands) Danny Holla (Groningen)
- (Serbia) Goran Lovre (Groningen)
- (Denmark) Morten Nordstrand (Groningen)
- (Sweden) Fredrik Stenman (Groningen)
- (Belgium) Birger Maertens (Heracles)
- (Netherlands) Sebastiaan Steur (Heracles)
- (Netherlands) Donny Gorter (NAC)
- (Netherlands) Patrick Zwaanswijk (NAC)
- (Morocco) Youssef El Akchaoui (NEC)
- (Netherlands) Bram Nuytinck (NEC)
- (Netherlands) Patrick Pothuizen (NEC)
- (Poland) Arkadiusz Radomski (NEC)
- (Netherlands) Orlando Engelaar (PSV)
- (Netherlands) Zakaria Labyad (PSV)
- (Bulgaria) Stanislav Manolev (PSV)
- (Belgium) Davy De Fauw (Roda JC)
- (Canada) Marcel de Jong (Roda JC)
- (Norway) Pa Modou Kah (Roda JC)
- (Netherlands) Jan-Paul Saeijs (Roda JC)
- (France) Edouard Duplan (Sparta)
- (Netherlands) Joshua John (Sparta)
- (Netherlands) Kevin Strootman (Sparta)
- (Brazil) Douglas (Twente)
- (Netherlands) Luuk de Jong (Twente)
- (Netherlands) Nicky Kuiper (Twente)
- (Netherlands) Sander Keller (Utrecht)
- (Denmark) Michael Silberbauer (Utrecht)
- (Belgium) Jan Wuytens (Utrecht)
- (Netherlands) Alexander Büttner (Vitesse Arnhem)
- (Netherlands) Serginho Greene (Vitesse Arnhem)
- (Turkey) Sinan Kaloğlu (Vitesse Arnhem)
- (Netherlands) Wiljan Pluim (Vitesse Arnhem)
- (Netherlands) Paul Verhaegh (Vitesse Arnhem)
- (Belgium) Ken Leemans (VVV)
- (Netherlands) Ferry de Regt (VVV)
- (Belgium) Bart Biemans (Willem II)
- (Netherlands) Gerson Sheotahul (Willem II)
- (Netherlands) Arjan Swinkels (Willem II)

1 goal

- (Netherlands) Santy Hulst (ADO)
- (Netherlands) Lex Immers (ADO)
- (Netherlands) Christian Kum (ADO)
- (Estonia) Andres Oper (ADO)
- (Netherlands) Charlton Vicento (ADO)
- (Cameroon) Eyong Enoh (Ajax)
- (Sweden) Rasmus Lindgren (Ajax)
- (Brazil) Jonathas (AZ)
- (Finland) Niklas Moisander (AZ)
- (Belgium) Sébastien Pocognoli (AZ)
- (Denmark) Simon Poulsen (AZ)
- (Netherlands) David Mendes da Silva (AZ)
- (Sweden) Pontus Wernbloom (AZ)
- (Serbia) Stefan Babović (Feyenoord)
- (Netherlands) Diego Biseswar (Feyenoord)
- (Netherlands) Kevin Hofland (Feyenoord)
- (Netherlands) Stefan de Vrij (Feyenoord)
- (Netherlands) Oussama Assaidi (Heerenveen)
- (Serbia) Filip Đuričić (Heerenveen)
- (North Macedonia) Samir Fazli (Heerenveen)
- (Norway) Christian Grindheim (Heerenveen)
- (North Macedonia) Goran Popov (Heerenveen)
- (Finland) Mika Väyrynen (Heerenveen)
- (Poland) Paweł Wojciechowski (Heerenveen)
- (Netherlands) Mark-Jan Fledderus (Heracles)
- (Netherlands) Antoine van der Linden (Heracles)
- (Netherlands) Mark Looms (Heracles)
- (Netherlands) Ellery Cairo (NAC)
- (Netherlands) Kurt Elshot (NAC)
- (Hungary) Csaba Feher (NAC)
- (Netherlands) Robbert Schilder (NAC)
- (Netherlands) Ferne Snoyl (NAC)
- (Netherlands) Lorenzo Davids (NEC)
- (Netherlands) Bas Sibum (NEC)
- (Netherlands) Rick ten Voorde (NEC)
- (Mexico) Francisco Rodríguez (PSV)
- (Serbia) Jagoš Vuković (PSV)
- (Netherlands) Kemy Agustien (RKC)
- (Netherlands) Ruud Berger (RKC)
- (Netherlands) Dustley Mulder (RKC)
- (Netherlands) Hans Mulder (RKC)
- (Belgium) Arnaud Sutchuin (Roda JC)
- (Netherlands) Ruud Vormer (Roda JC)
- (Nigeria) Ayodele Adeleye (Sparta)
- (Croatia) Darko Bodul (Sparta)
- (Netherlands) Sander van Gessel (Sparta)
- (Netherlands) Milano Koenders (Sparta)
- (Netherlands) Wout Brama (Twente)
- (Netherlands) Theo Janssen (Twente)
- (Netherlands) Ronnie Stam (Twente)
- (Netherlands) Dwight Tiendalli (Twente)
- (Ivory Coast) Cheick Tioté (Twente)
- (Netherlands) Peter Wisgerhof (Twente)
- (Ghana) Nana Asare (Utrecht)
- (Netherlands) Tim Cornelisse (Utrecht)
- (Netherlands) Erixon Danso (Utrecht)
- (Ghana) Francis Dickoh (Utrecht)
- (Netherlands) Gregoor van Dijk (Utrecht)
- (Netherlands) Gianluca Nijholt (Utrecht)
- (Netherlands) Alje Schut (Utrecht)
- (Belgium) Kevin Vandenbergh (Utrecht)
- (Netherlands) Nicky Hofs (Vitesse Arnhem)
- (Netherlands Antilles) Civard Sprockel (Vitesse Arnhem)
- (Belgium) Kevin Van Dessel (VVV)
- (Netherlands) Frank van Kouwen (VVV)
- (Netherlands) Patrick Paauwe (VVV)
- (Netherlands) Michael Timisela (VVV)
- (Nigeria) Michael Uchebo (VVV)
- (Nigeria) Alex Nkume (VVV)
- (Netherlands) Jan-Arie van der Heijden (Willem II)
- (Netherlands) Marlon Pereira (Willem II)

Own goals

- Scored for ADO (5): (Netherlands) Giovanni van Bronckhorst (Feyenoord); (Sierra Leone) Gibril Sankoh (Groningen); (Netherlands) Antoine van der Linden (Heracles); (Netherlands) Mark Looms (Heracles); (Netherlands) Bram Nuytinck (NEC)
- Scored for Ajax (2): (Netherlands) Hans Mulder (RKC); (Netherlands) Paul Verhaegh (Vitesse Arnhem)
- Scored for AZ (4): (Czech Republic) Martin Lejsal (Heerenveen); (Norway) Pa Modou Kah (Roda JC); (Netherlands) Peter Wisgerhof (Twente – 2 goals)
- Scored for Feyenoord (3): (Sweden) Pontus Wernbloom (AZ); (Netherlands) Toni Varela (RKC); (Netherlands) Patrick Paauwe (VVV)
- Scored for NAC (1): (Netherlands) Niels Wellenberg (NEC)
- Scored for NEC (1): (Netherlands) Christiaan Kum (ADO)
- Scored for RKC (2): (Serbia) Marko Pantelić (Ajax); (Netherlands) Calvin Jong-a-Pin (Vitesse Arnhem)
- Scored for Roda JC (2): (Netherlands) Jurgen Colin (RKC); (Netherlands) Frank van der Struijk (Vitesse Arnhem)
- Scored for Vitesse Arnhem (1): (Netherlands) Dustley Mulder (RKC)
- Scored for VVV (1): (Netherlands Antilles) Civard Sprockel (Vitesse Arnhem)
- Scored for Willem II (1): (Nigeria) Ayodele Adeleye (Sparta)

== Play-offs ==
=== European competition ===
The teams placed 6th through 9th compete in a play-off tournament for one spot in the second qualifying round of the UEFA Europa League 2010–11.

==== Semi-finals ====
Team 1	Agg.	Team 2	1st leg	2nd leg
Roda JC	3–2	Heracles Almelo	1–1	2–1
FC Utrecht	5–1	FC Groningen	3–1	2–0

==== Final ====
Team 1	Agg.	Team 2	1st leg	2nd leg
Roda JC	1–6	FC Utrecht	0–2	1–4

=== Relegation ===
The 16th and 17th placed teams, along with the teams from Eerste Divisie, participate in a play-off for two spots in 2010–11 Eredivisie.

==== Round 1 ====
Team 1	Agg.	Team 2	1st leg	2nd leg
FC Eindhoven	4–2	AGOVV Apeldoorn	1–0	3–2
Helmond Sport	3–3 (p. 5–4)	FC Den Bosch	1–2	2–1

==== Round 2 ====
Team 1	Agg.	Team 2	1st leg	2nd leg
FC Eindhoven	2–3	Willem II	1–2	1–1
Go Ahead Eagles	2–1	SC Cambuur	2–0	0–1
FC Zwolle	3–5	Excelsior	0–1	3–4
Helmond Sport	2–3	Sparta Rotterdam	2–1	0–2

==== Round 3 ====
Team 1	Agg.	Team 2	1st leg	2nd leg
Go Ahead Eagles	1–3(aet)	Willem II	1–0	0–3
Excelsior	1–1(ag)	Sparta Rotterdam	0–0	1–1

Willem II and Excelsior will play in 2010–11 Eredivisie.

== Awards ==
=== Annual awards ===
Award	Winner	Club
Golden Shoe (Player of the Year)	(Uruguay) Luis Suárez	(Netherlands) Ajax
Silver Shoe	(Belgium) Dries Mertens	(Netherlands) Utrecht
Bronze Shoe	(Netherlands) Demy de Zeeuw	(Netherlands) Ajax
Talent of the Year	(Netherlands) Gregory van der Wiel	(Netherlands) Ajax
Golden Card (Referee of the Year)	(Netherlands) Roelof Luinge	(Netherlands) KNVB

Team of the Year
Goalkeeper	(Netherlands) Maarten Stekelenburg (Ajax)			
Defence	(Netherlands) Gregory van der Wiel (Ajax)	(Brazil) Douglas (FC Twente)	(Belgium) Jan Vertonghen (Ajax)	(Netherlands) Urby Emanuelson (Ajax)
Midfield	(Netherlands) Theo Janssen (FC Twente)	(Netherlands) Wout Brama (FC Twente)		(Netherlands) Ibrahim Afellay (PSV)
Forwards	(Costa Rica) Bryan Ruiz (FC Twente)		(Uruguay) Luis Suárez (Ajax)	(Hungary) Balázs Dzsudzsák (PSV)

== Attendances ==
Ajax drew the highest average home attendance in the 2009-10 edition of the Eredivisie.

#	Football club	Home games	Average attendance
1	AFC Ajax	17	48,681
2	Feyenoord	17	43,882
3	PSV	17	33,471
4	sc Heerenveen	17	25,691
5	FC Twente	17	23,641
6	FC Groningen	17	21,828
7	FC Utrecht	17	21,199
8	Vitesse	17	16,980
9	NAC Breda	17	16,567
10	AZ	17	16,503
11	Roda JC	17	14,749
12	Willem II	17	12,821
13	NEC	17	12,379
14	ADO Den Haag	17	11,720
15	Sparta Rotterdam	17	10,155
16	Heracles Almelo	17	8,457
17	VVV-Venlo	17	7,465
18	RKC Waalwijk	17	6,388
