= 2012 KNVB Cup final =

- Event: 2011–12 KNVB Cup
PSV Eindhoven	Heracles Almelo
3	0
- Date: 8 April 2012
- Venue: De Kuip, Rotterdam
- Referee: Pol van Boekel
- Attendance: 50,000

The 2012 KNVB Cup final was a football match between PSV Eindhoven and Heracles Almelo that took place on 8 April 2012 at De Kuip, Rotterdam. It was the final match of the 2011–12 KNVB Cup competition and the 94th Dutch Cup final.

PSV Eindhoven beat Heracles Almelo 3–0 and won their 9th KNVB Cup trophy.

This match was also Heracles Almelo's first and, as of 2026, only appearance in a KNVB Cup final in their club's entire history.

== Route to the final ==
PSV Eindhoven		Round	Heracles Almelo	
Opponent	Result		Opponent	Result
VVSB	0–8 (A)	Second round	JVC Cuijk	0–1 (A)
Lisse	3–0 (H)	Third round	VV Berkum	4–0 (H)
FC Twente	1–2 (a.e.t.) (A)	Fourth round	De Graafschap	4–0 (H)
NEC	3–2 (H)	Quarter-finals	RKC Waalwijk	3–0 (H)
Heerenveen	1–3 (A)	Semi-finals	AZ	2–4 (a.e.t.) (A)

== Match ==
=== Details ===
8 April 2012
18:00

PSV Eindhoven	3–0	Heracles Almelo
Toivonen 31'; Mertens 56'; Lens 63'	Report

De Kuip, Rotterdam
Attendance: 50,000
Referee: Pol van Boekel

PSV Eindhoven	Heracles Almelo

GK	21	(Poland) Przemysław Tytoń
CB	4	(Brazil) Marcelo
CB	3	(Netherlands) Wilfred Bouma
LB	5	(Netherlands) Erik Pieters
RB	13	(Canada) Atiba Hutchinson
CM	6	(Netherlands) Kevin Strootman
CM	20	(Morocco) Zakaria Labyad	(substituted off) 75'
AM	7	(Sweden) Ola Toivonen (c)
LW	14	(Belgium) Dries Mertens	(substituted off) 86'
RW	10	(Netherlands) Georginio Wijnaldum
CF	17	(Netherlands) Jeremain Lens	(substituted off) 80'
Substitutes:
RB	2	(Bulgaria) Stanislav Manolev
RB	8	(Netherlands) Orlando Engelaar	(substituted on) 75'
LW	9	(Slovenia) Tim Matavž	(substituted on) 80'
CB	18	(Belgium) Timothy Derijck
CF	19	(Netherlands) Jan Vennegoor of Hesselink
CF	22	(Netherlands) Memphis Depay	(substituted on) 86'
GK	33	(Morocco) Khalid Sinouh
Manager:
(Netherlands) Phillip Cocu

GK	22	(Netherlands) Remko Pasveer
CB	4	(Netherlands) Antoine van der Linden (c)
CB	14	(Netherlands) Ben Rienstra
LB	5	(Netherlands) Mark Looms
RB	2	(Netherlands) Tim Breukers
DM	17	(Ghana) Kwame Quansah
DM	7	(Netherlands) Lerin Duarte	(substituted off) 66'
AM	23	(Cameroon) Willie Overtoom	(substituted off) 71'
CM	11	(Brazil) Everton
RW	21	(Suriname) Darl Douglas	(substituted off) 66'
CF	19	(Sweden) Samuel Armenteros
Substitutes:
LB	5	(Australia) Jason Davidson
RW	10	(Netherlands) Marko Vejinović	(substituted on) 66'
RW	15	(Netherlands) Ninos Gouriye	(substituted on) 71'
DM	20	(Netherlands) Thomas Bruns	(substituted on) 66'
GK	26	(Netherlands) Dennis Telgenkamp
CB	32	(Netherlands) Mike te Wierik
CM	27	(Netherlands) Luís Pedro
Manager:
(Netherlands) Peter Bosz

Match rules

- 90 minutes.
- 30 minutes of extra-time if necessary.
- Penalty shoot-out if scores still level.
- Maximum of three substitutions.
