= Étienne De Beule =

Belgian cyclist (1953–2023)

Etienne De Beule
Personal information
- Born: 20 November 1953 Hamme, Belgium
- Died: 10 June 2023 (aged 69) Ghent, Belgium

Cycling career
- Sport: Cycling
- Role: Rider

Etienne De Beule (20 November 1953 – 10 June 2023) was a Belgian professional racing cyclist. He rode in the 1985 Tour de France. He was the father of football player Davy De Beule. De Beule died in Ghent on 10 June 2023, at the age of 69.
