= Przemysław Tytoń =

Polish footballer (born 1987)

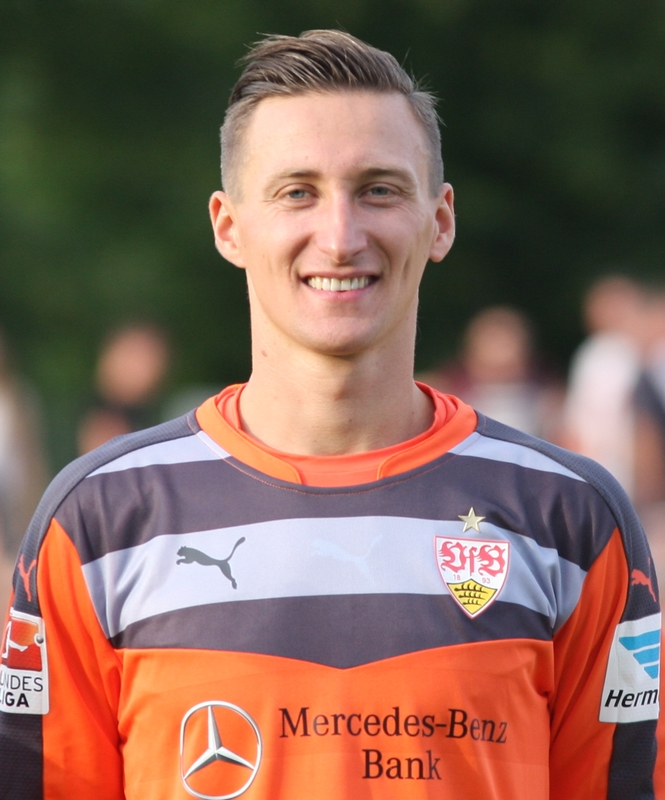
- Tytoń with VfB Stuttgart in 2015

Personal information
- Full name: Przemysław Tytoń
- Date of birth: 4 January 1987 (age 39)
- Place of birth: Zamość, Poland
- Height: 1.95 m (6 ft 5 in)
- Position: Goalkeeper

Youth career
- 2004: AMSPN Hetman Zamość

Senior career*
Years	Team	Apps	(Gls)
2004–2005	Hetman Zamość		
2005–2007	Górnik Łęczna	20	(0)
2007–2011	Roda JC	46	(0)
2011–2015	PSV	24	(0)
2013–2014	Jong PSV	7	(0)
2014–2015	→ Elche (loan)	32	(0)
2015–2016	VfB Stuttgart	30	(0)
2016–2018	Deportivo La Coruña	15	(0)
2019–2021	FC Cincinnati	42	(0)
2022	Ajax	0	(0)
2022–2026	Twente	9	(0)

International career
2006	Poland U19	6	(0)
2007	Poland U20	1	(0)
2008	Poland U21	2	(0)
2010–2016	Poland	14	(0)
- * Club domestic league appearances and goals as of 16:25, 17 May 2026 (UTC)

Przemysław Tytoń (Polish pronunciation: [pʂɛˈmɨswaf ˈtɨtɔɲ]; born 4 January 1987) is a Polish professional footballer who plays as a goalkeeper.

== Club career ==
Born in Zamość, Tytoń played for Górnik Łęczna until the end of the 2006–07 season when the Polish first-league club was relegated to the third division because of corruption. His application to be released from his contract was granted by the PZPN, following which he signed a five-year contract with Roda JC.

=== Roda JC ===
His Eredivisie debut came on 29 March 2008 in a goalless draw against Heracles Almelo. However, he did not make any appearances the following season.

In January 2010, Tytoń became the club's first choice goalkeeper, taking over from Bram Castro. He had shoulder surgery at the end of March 2011.

After 2010–11 Eredivisie season, Tytoń was listed as the second best goalkeeper, only behind Maarten Stekelenburg. He had an offer from Belgian champion KRC Genk, but did not accept it.

=== PSV ===
On 16 August 2011, it was announced that PSV Eindhoven had taken Tytoń on a one-year loan, with an option to buy at the end of the season. On 20 January 2012, it was announced that PSV has signed Tytoń for an extra four years.

On 18 September 2011, Tytoń suffered a serious concussion when he collided with a teammate during the match between PSV and Ajax and was subsequently carried out on a stretcher, with the game delayed for 15 minutes. There was no serious damage so he was discharged from hospital the next day. In the Europa League match against FC Rapid București (2–1) Tyton was back in goal for PSV.

Tytoń rapidly gained a strong form in goal for PSV after his injury and replaced former first choice goalkeeper Andreas Isaksson by the time Phillip Cocu had been announced as caretaker manager after Fred Rutten in March 2012. Among many strong matches, he especially displayed his talent in the 2011–12 KNVB Beker semi final against SC Heerenveen where PSV advanced to the final on a 3–1 victory. Tytoń at times almost single-handedly kept the opposition from producing a comeback and saved a penalty from the 2011-12 Eredivisie topscorer Bas Dost. He subsequently became known as the "penalty killer" among media and fans.

He featured in the KNVB Beker final on 8 April 2012, where PSV beat Heracles Almelo 3–0.

At the start of the 2012–13 season, Tytoń received the number 1 shirt at PSV after the departure of Isaksson. He began the season as the first choice goalkeeper, ahead of the new signing Boy Waterman. However, after five league games, Tytoń was demoted to the bench as Waterman was preferred as the first choice goalkeeper by the new manager Dick Advocaat.

==== Elche (loan) ====
On 4 July 2014, Tytoń joined La Liga side Elche on a one-year loan deal. He began the season as a starter on matchday one against Barcelona at the Camp Nou, in which he conceded three goals. However, after four games, he lost his starting spot to Manu Herrera. Despite this, a month later and due to an injury to Herrera, Tytoń regained his position, putting in decisive performances. At the end of the season, Elche avoided relegation and Tytoń made 35 total appearances.

=== VfB Stuttgart ===
For the 2015–16 season Tytoń moved to VfB Stuttgart. He made his Bundesliga debut on 16 August 2015 – the first matchday of the domestic season – in a 3–1 defeat at home to 1. FC Köln. After a 6–2 away loss to Werder Bremen on towards the end of the season, Tytoń was replaced in goal in the final two games of the season by Mitchell Langerak, who had been sidelined with an injury since pre-season.

=== Deportivo La Coruña ===
On 30 June 2016, Tytoń signed a three-year deal with Deportivo de La Coruña, returning to Spain one year after leaving Elche. He started the season as a backup to Germán Lux, but due to the team's poor defensive performances, Tytoń took over as the starter on 31 October in a 1–1 draw against Valencia. The club finished in 16th place; clear of relegation, and Tytoń made 13 total appearances during the season, losing his starting spot to Lux again after poor displays against Barcelona (4–0) and Celta (4–1).

=== FC Cincinnati ===
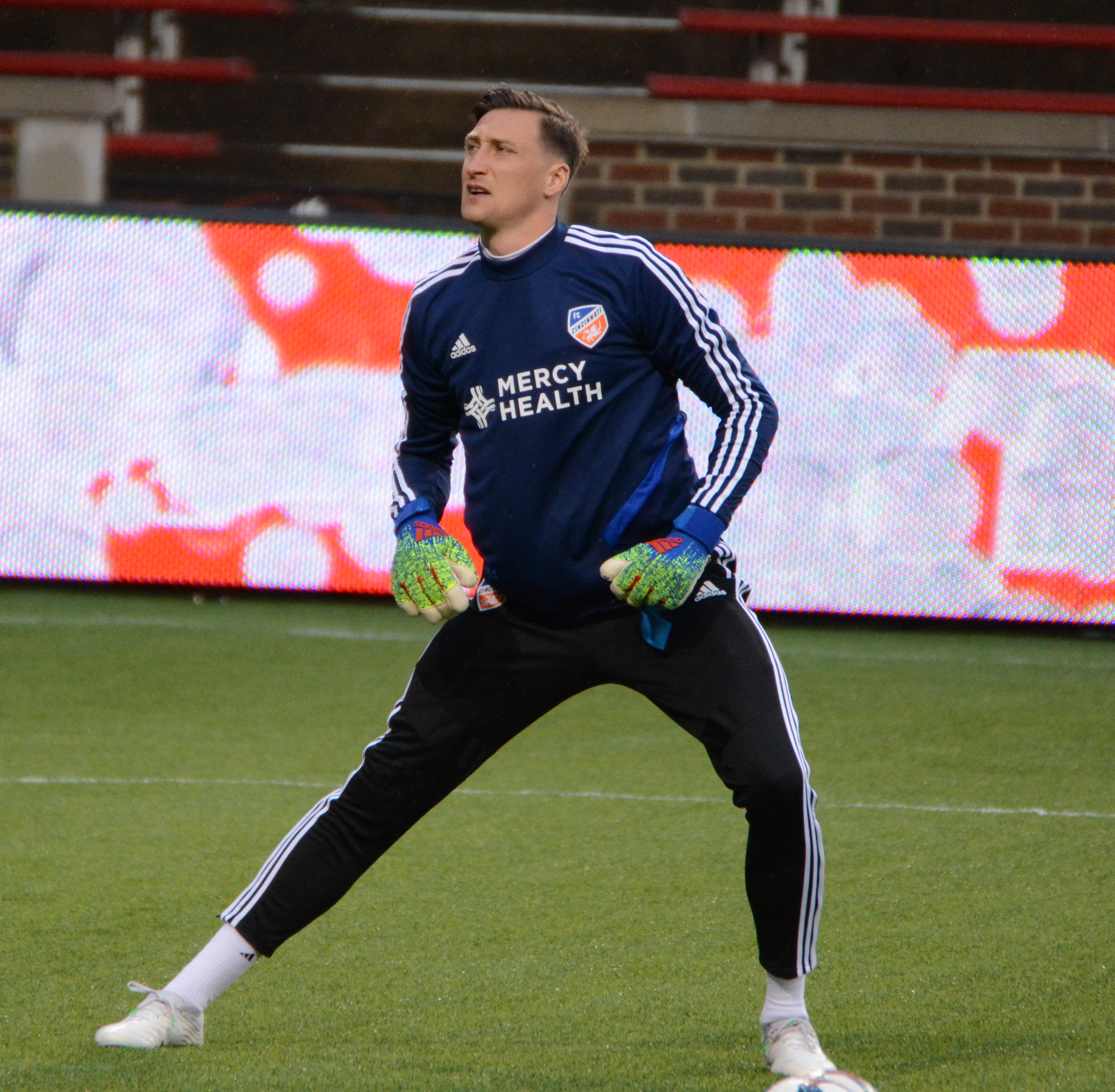
Tytoń with FC Cincinnati in 2019

On 13 December 2018, Tytoń joined Major League Soccer club FC Cincinnati ahead of their inaugural 2019 season. He made his debut for the club on 2 March 2019 in FC Cincinnati's first match against the Seattle Sounders FC which they lost 4–1. After the match, Tytoń sustained a hamstring injury which kept him until April, with backup goalkeeper Spencer Richey starting in the meantime. Throughout the season, Tytoń competed with Richey for the starting spot, appearing in 15 matches.

Following the 2021 season, Cincinnati declined their contract option on Tytoń.

=== Ajax ===
On 7 March 2022, Tytoń returned to the Eredivisie to play for AFC Ajax who were in desperate need of a goalkeeper after injuries of Maarten Stekelenburg, Remko Pasveer and Jay Gorter.

=== Twente ===
On 23 May 2022, Tytoń moved to Twente on a two-year contract, with the option of an additional year. The move reunited him with his former FC Cincinnati head coach Ron Jans.

== International career ==
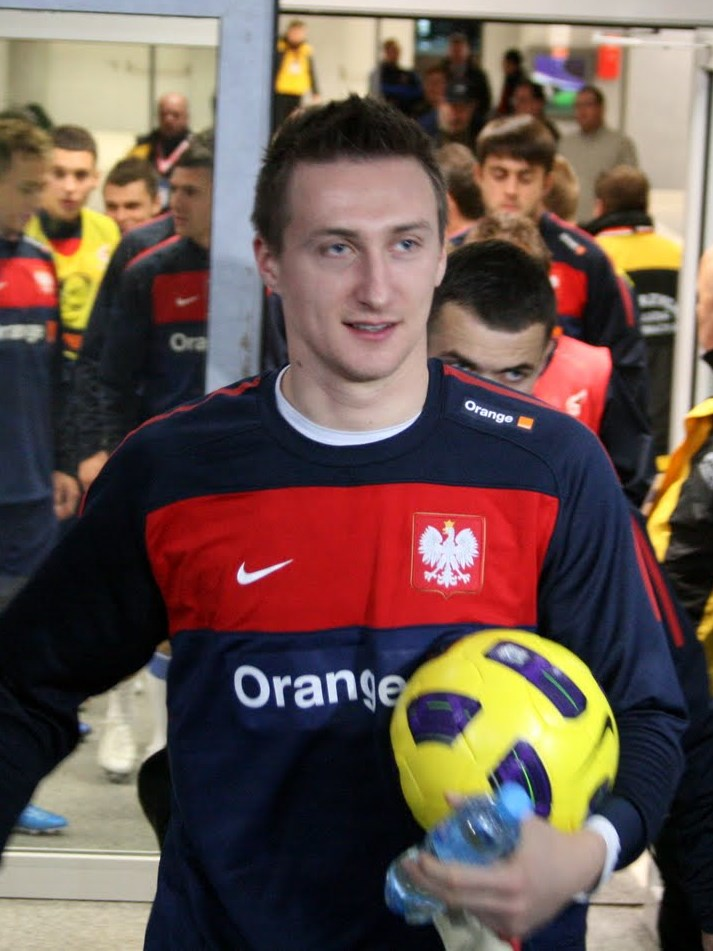
Tytoń before a match for Poland in 2010

On 29 May 2010, Tytoń debuted for the Poland national team in a 0–0 draw against Finland.

On the 68th minute in the opening UEFA Euro 2012 match against Greece, Tytoń came on as a substitute to replace Maciej Rybus and saved the penalty taken by Greek captain Giorgos Karagounis. The game ended in a 1–1 draw. He became the first goalkeeper in history of the European Championships to save a penalty after coming on. After the match, Tytoń said about saving the penalty: "It felt like a dream, I was aware that now was my chance. I really wanted to help the team. Thank God I saved the penalty."

== Career statistics ==
=== Club ===
As of match played 17 May 2026

Appearances and goals by club, season and competition
Club	Season	League			National cup (Note: Includes KNVB Cup, Copa del Rey, U.S. Open Cup)		Continental		Other		Total	
Club	Season	Division	Apps	Goals	Apps	Goals	Apps	Goals	Apps	Goals	Apps	Goals
Górnik Łęczna	2005–06	Ekstraklasa	5	0	0	0	—		—		5	0
Górnik Łęczna	2006–07	Ekstraklasa	15	0	0	0	—		4 (Note: Appearances in Ekstraklasa Cup)	0	19	0
Górnik Łęczna	Total		20	0	0	0	—		4	0	24	0
Roda JC Kerkrade	2007–08	Eredivisie	1	0	0	0	—		0	0	1	0
Roda JC Kerkrade	2008–09	Eredivisie	0	0	0	0	—		0	0	0	0
Roda JC Kerkrade	2009–10	Eredivisie	16	0	0	0	—		4 (Note: Appearance(s) in Eredivisie UEFA Europa League playoffs)	0	20	0
Roda JC Kerkrade	2010–11	Eredivisie	27	0	3	0	—		—		30	0
Roda JC Kerkrade	2011–12	Eredivisie	2	0	0	0	—		—		2	0
Roda JC Kerkrade	Total		46	0	3	0	—		4	0	53	0
PSV	2011–12	Eredivisie	12	0	3	0	3 (Note: Appearance(s) in UEFA Europa League)	0	—		18	0
PSV	2012–13	Eredivisie	6	0	1	0	2	0	1 (Note: Appearance(s) in Johan Cruyff Shield)	0	10	0
PSV	2013–14	Eredivisie	6	0	1	0	3	0	0	0	10	0
PSV	Total		24	0	5	0	8	0	1	0	38	0
Jong PSV	2013–14	Eerste Divisie	7	0	—		—		—		7	0
Elche (loan)	2014–15	La Liga	32	0	3	0	—		—		35	0
VfB Stuttgart	2015–16	Bundesliga	30	0	0	0	—		—		30	0
Deportivo La Coruña	2016–17	La Liga	13	0	0	0	—		—		13	0
Deportivo La Coruña	2017–18	La Liga	2	0	1	0	—		—		3	0
Deportivo La Coruña	2018–19	Segunda División	0	0	0	0	—		—		0	0
Deportivo La Coruña	Total		15	0	1	0	—		—		16	0
FC Cincinnati	2019	Major League Soccer	15	0	2	0	—		—		17	0
FC Cincinnati	2020	Major League Soccer	12 (Note: Three appearances in the MLS is Back Tournament group stage)	0	—		—		1 (Note: Appearance in the MLS is Back Tournament knockout stage)	0	13	0
FC Cincinnati	2021	Major League Soccer	15	0	0	0	—		—		15	0
FC Cincinnati	Total		42	0	2	0	—		1	0	45	0
Ajax	2021–22	Eredivisie	0	0	0	0	—		—		0	0
Twente	2022–23	Eredivisie	1	0	0	0	—		—		1	0
Twente	2023–24	Eredivisie	2	0	0	0	0	0	—		2	0
Twente	2024–25	Eredivisie	3	0	0	0	2	0	2 (Note: Appearances in Eredivisie UEFA Conference League play-offs)	0	7	0
Twente	2025–26	Eredivisie	3	0	0	0	—		—		3	0
Twente	Total		9	0	0	0	2	0	2	0	13	0
Career total			225	0	14	0	10	0	12	0	261	0

=== International ===
Appearances, conceded goals and clean sheets by national team
National team	Year	Apps	Conceded goals	Clean sheets
Poland	2010	4	6	1
Poland	2011	1	1	0
Poland	2012	8	7	3
Poland	2016	1	0	1
Total		14	14	5

== Honours ==
PSV

- KNVB Cup: 2011–12
- Johan Cruyff Shield: 2012

Ajax

- Eredivisie: 2021–22
