= Davy De Beule =

Belgian footballer

Personal information
- Full name: Davy De Beule
- Date of birth: 7 November 1981 (age 45)
- Place of birth: Hamme, Belgium
- Height: 1.80 m (5 ft 11 in)
- Position: Right midfielder

Youth career
- 1988–1992: Hamme
- 1992–1999: Lokeren

Senior career*
Years	Team	Apps	(Gls)
1999–2004	Lokeren	108	(25)
2005–2008	Gent	83	(9)
2009–2011	Kortrijk	79	(14)
2011–2014	Roda	48	(5)
2014–2017	Beerschot Wilrijk	32	(2)
Total		350	(55)
- * Club domestic league appearances and goals

Davy De Beule (born 7 November 1981) is a Belgian former professional footballer who played as a right midfielder.

== Career ==
De Beule was born in Hamme as the son of the cyclist Étienne De Beule. He signed at Hamme at the age of 6 and moved to Lokeren in 1992. Six years later, he entered the first team squad of the club. He played a total of 128 games for Lokeren. In the 2002–03 season, he played a fundamental role in the club's achievement of third place in the national championship, and was named Belgian Young Professional Footballer of the Year. He stayed at Lokeren until 2004, when he moved to Gent. With Gent he reached the final of the 2007–08 Belgian Cup, also placing fourth in the national championship in 2006 and 2007. In 2009 he moved to Kortrijk, where he stayed until 2011. Next, he joined Roda of the Eredivisie. In his first season at Roda, he played 24 games and scored 4 goals. In 2014, he moved to Beerschot Wilrijk, where, in 2017, he ended his professional career as a player.

== International career ==
In his top year at Lokeren, he was selected for Belgium national football team, but got injured during training and thus was not able to debut with the national team.

== Honours ==
=== Club ===
Lokeren

- Belgian First Division A third place: 2002–03

Gent

- Belgian Cup runner-up: 2007–08
- UEFA Intertoto Cup runner-up: 2006, 2007

Individual

- Belgian Young Professional Footballer of the Year: 2002–03
