= Ferry de Regt =

Dutch footballer (born 1988)

Personal information
- Date of birth: 29 August 1988 (age 38)
- Place of birth: Venlo, Netherlands
- Height: 1.91 m (6 ft 3 in)
- Position: Centre back

Youth career
- Quick Boys '31
- 1999–2006: VVV-Venlo

Senior career*
Years	Team	Apps	(Gls)
2006–2013	VVV-Venlo	101	(7)
2012–2013	→ Helmond Sport (loan)	31	(4)
2013–2015	Helmond Sport	47	(7)
2015–2017	Fortuna Sittard	71	(11)
2017–2019	TOP Oss	22	(0)
2019–2020	Helmond Sport	25	(1)
2020–2022	SV 19 Straelen	25	(2)
Total		322	(32)
- * Club domestic league appearances and goals

Ferry de Regt (Dutch pronunciation: [ˈfɛri də ˈrɛxt]; born 29 August 1988) is a Dutch former professional footballer who played as a centre back.

== Career ==
De Regt began playing for Quick Boys '31 in southern Venlo. He joined VVV-Venlo at age eleven, and broke through to the first team in 2006. His senior debut came on 15 December 2006 in a 1–0 away win against FC Den Bosch, where he came on as a substitute. De Regt gained promotion to the Eredivisie in the 2006–07 season after beating RKC Waalwijk in play-offs. His competitive debut in the Eredivisie came one year after his second division debut, on 15 December 2007 as a starter in a 1–1 draw against FC Twente.

De Regt initially started as a right-back, but began starting as a regular centre back together with Frank van Kouwen due to injuries of centre backs Reekers and Verdellen. Since then, he has been a starter in central defence for VVV.

In the 2012–13 season, De Regt plays on loan for Helmond Sport in the Eerste Divisie.

On 1 July 2019, De Regt returned to Helmond Sport on a one-year deal.

In the summer 2020, he moved to German fourth-tier Regionalliga West club SV 19 Straelen. He retired from professional football in May 2022.
