= Antoine van der Linden =

Dutch former footballer (born 1976)

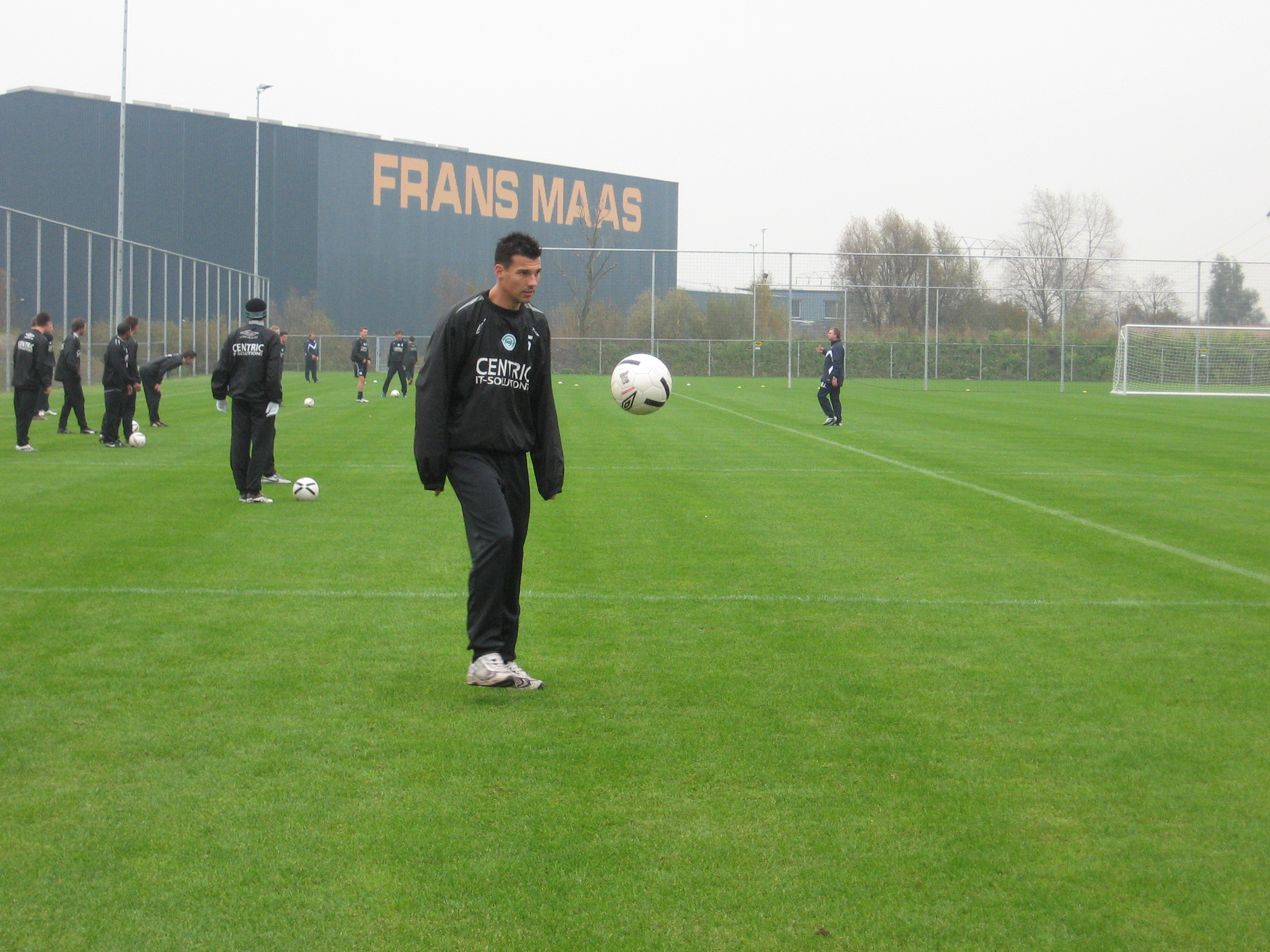
- Van der Linden training with Groningen in 2006

Personal information
- Full name: Antoine van der Linden
- Date of birth: 17 March 1976 (age 50)
- Place of birth: Rotterdam, Netherlands
- Height: 1.92 m (6 ft 3 1/2 in)
- Position: Centre back

Youth career
- Zwervers
- Alexandria '66
- SVS
- Nieuwerkerk
- Sparta Rotterdam

Senior career*
Years	Team	Apps	(Gls)
1997–2000	Sparta Rotterdam	37	(1)
2000–2001	Swindon Town	33	(1)
2001–2003	Emmen	56	(0)
2003–2007	Groningen	106	(4)
2007–2009	Marítimo	39	(0)
2009	Marítimo B	2	(0)
2009–2012	Heracles	97	(3)
2012–2013	Emmen	28	(2)
2013–2016	WKE	40	(4)
Total		438	(15)
- * Club domestic league appearances and goals

Antoine van der Linden (Dutch pronunciation: [ɑnˈtʋɑɱ vɑn dər ˈlɪndə(n)]; born 17 March 1976) is a Dutch former footballer who played as a central defender.

He amassed Eredivisie totals of 240 games and eight goals over the course of ten seasons, representing in the competition Sparta Rotterdam, Groningen and Heracles.

== Football career ==
Born in Rotterdam, van der Linden started his career in 1997 with local Sparta Rotterdam, appearing in an average of 12 Eredivisie games during three seasons. In the 2000 summer he joined Swindon Town in England, featuring regularly for the Football League One club.

After only one year, van der Linden returned to his country, signing with FC Emmen of the second division. In 2003, he returned to the top level, playing four solid years with FC Groningen and helping the side to the fifth position in the 2005–06 campaign, with the subsequent qualification to the UEFA Cup.

In 2007, van der Linden moved to Portugal with C.S. Marítimo: never an undisputed starter with the Madeirans, he did manage to appear regularly, but also experienced a brief spell with the reserves in his second and last year.

In July 2009, 33-year-old van der Linden signed a one-year deal with Heracles Almelo as a replacement for Jan Wuytens who moved to FC Utrecht. He helped the team to the sixth place in the top flight, contributing with one goal in a 4–1 home win over bottom-placed RKC Waalwijk.
