= Kenneth Staelens =

Belgian footballer

Personal information
- Full name: Kenneth Staelens
- Date of birth: 3 May 1991 (age 35)
- Place of birth: Heusden-Zolder, Belgium
- Position: Midfielder

Team information
- Current team: Zonhoven United

Youth career
- RC Genk

Senior career*
Years	Team	Apps	(Gls)
2009–2012	Roda JC	1	(0)
2012–2013	Esperanza Neerpelt	2	(0)
2013–2015	Sporting Hasselt	38	(2)
2015–2016	Bilzerse Waltwilder		
2016–2017	KESK Leopoldsburg		
2017–	Zonhoven United		
- * Club domestic league appearances and goals as of 1 January 2016

Kenneth Staelens (Dutch pronunciation: [ˈkɛnət ˈstaːləns]; born 3 May 1991) is a Graphic director, working for Sporthouse Group. In his youth he played football for several decent teams in Belgium and the Netherlands.

== Career ==
Staelens played in his youth for KRC Genk and from 2009 to 2012 on professional side for Dutch club Roda JC Kerkrade in the Dutch Eredivisie. On 13 August 2012 announced his return to Belgium and signed with Esperanza Neerpelt.
