= Joey Belterman =

Dutch footballer

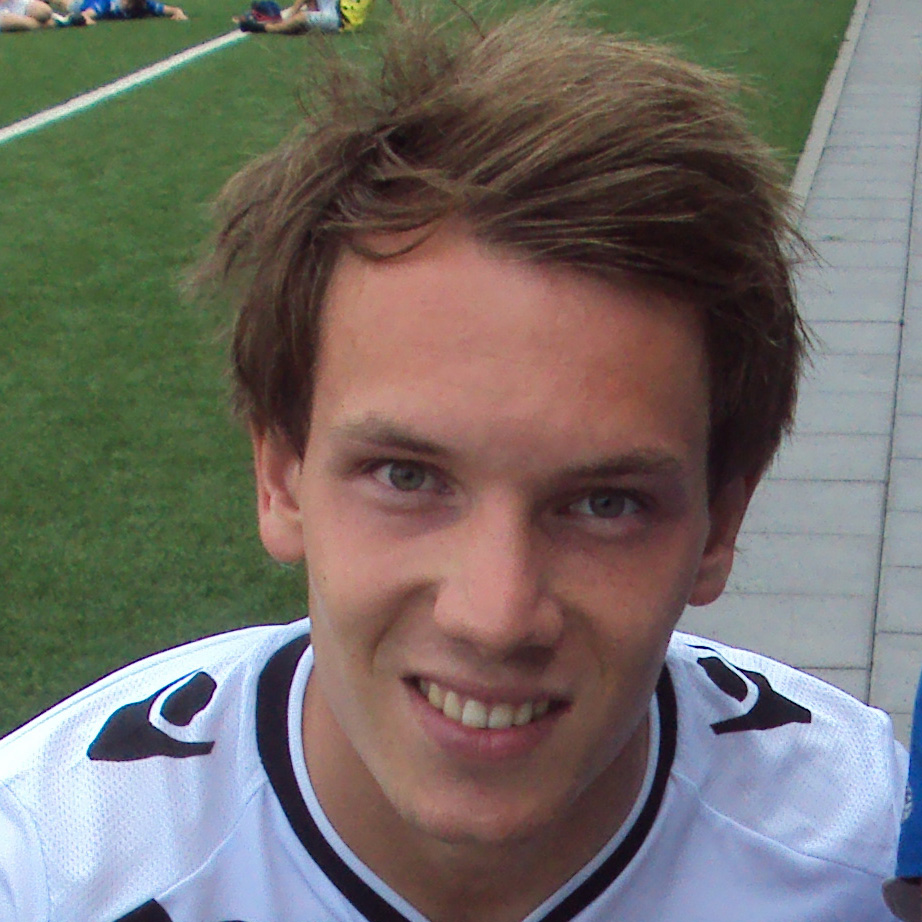

Personal information
- Full name: Joey Belterman
- Date of birth: 18 August 1993 (age 33)
- Place of birth: Ruurlo, Netherlands
- Height: 1.70 m (5 ft 7 in)
- Position: Midfielder

Team information
- Current team: RKZVC Zieuwent

Youth career
- RKZVC Zieuwent
- VA FC Twente

Senior career*
| Years | Team | Apps | (Gls) |
| 2011–2014 | Heracles | 11 | (0) |
| 2014–2016 | FC Den Bosch | 37 | (3) |
| 2016–2017 | Spakenburg | 10 | (0) |
| 2017– | RKZVC Zieuwent | | |

International career
| 2013 | Netherlands U-20 | | |
- * Club domestic league appearances and goals as of 12 April 2017 (UTC)

Joey Belterman (born 18 August 1993 in Ruurlo) is a Dutch footballer who currently plays as a midfielder for RKZVC Zieuwent.

== Club career ==
Belterman came through the FC Twente youth ranks but made his Eredivisie debut for Heracles in February 2012 against Roda JC. In summer 2014 he moved to Eerste Divisie club FC Den Bosch.

Belterman joined Tweede Divisie side Spakenburg in summer 2016.
