= Sanharib Malki =

Syrian footballer (born 1984)

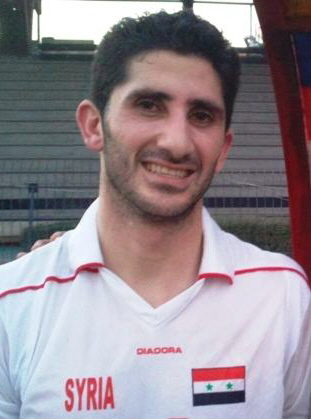

Personal information
- Full name: Sanharib Malki Sabah
- Date of birth: 1 March 1984 (age 42)
- Place of birth: Qamishli, Syria
- Height: 1.80 m (5 ft 11 in)
- Position: Forward

Youth career
- 1999–2002: RSD Jette

Senior career*
Years	Team	Apps	(Gls)
2002–2005	Union SG	100	(45)
2006–2007	Roeselare	28	(7)
2007–2009	Germinal Beerschot	69	(23)
2009–2011	Lokeren	31	(3)
2011	→ Panthrakikos (loan)	13	(1)
2011–2013	Roda JC	65	(42)
2013–2016	Kasımpaşa	61	(11)
2017	Al-Wakrah	3	(0)
2018	Fatih Karagümrük	6	(0)
2020	RSD Jette		

International career
2008–2016	Syria	28	(7)
- * Club domestic league appearances and goals

Sanharib Malki Sabah (Syriac: ܣܢܚܪܝܒ ܡܠܟܝ; Arabic: سنحاريب ملكي صباح; born 1 March 1984) is a Syrian former professional footballer who played as a forward.

== Club career ==
For K.S.V. Roeselare, his previous club, he scored their first European goal in the first qualifying round of the UEFA Cup 2006-07 against FK Vardar from Macedonia.

== International career ==
Malki received his first cap in the 2010 FIFA World Cup qualification tournament for Syria against Kuwait on 8 June 2008, thereby eliminating the possibility of playing for Belgium ever again although just one month earlier he was on a training camp with the Belgium national football team under 23s.

== Personal life ==
Malki is of Aramean ethnicity. Besides his Syrian nationality, he also holds Belgian and Turkish passports.

== Career statistics ==
Scores and results table. Syria's goal tally first:

Sanharib Malki: International goals
No.	Date	Venue	Opponent	Score	Result	Competition
1	22 June 2008	Tahnoun bin Mohammed Stadium, Al-Ain, UAE	United Arab Emirates	3–1	3–1	2010 FIFA World Cup qualification
2	15 November 2013	Shahid Dastgerdi Stadium, Tehran, Iran	Singapore	1–0	4–0	2015 AFC Asian Cup qualification
3	12 November 2014	Kuala Lumpur, Malaysia	Malaysia	2–0	3–0	International Friendly
4	15 November 2014	Jakarta, Indonesia	Indonesia	1–0	2-0	International Friendly
5	11 June 2015	Mashhad, Iran	Afghanistan	5–0	6–0	2018 FIFA World Cup qualification
6	8 September 2015	Phnom Penh, Cambodia	Cambodia	2–0	6–0	2018 FIFA World Cup qualification
7	24 March 2016	Seeb, Oman	Cambodia	6–0	6–0	2018 FIFA World Cup qualification
