= Leon Broekhof =

Dutch footballer

Personal information
- Date of birth: 14 May 1988 (age 38)
- Place of birth: Brummen, Netherlands
- Position: Centre back

Youth career
- Vitesse

Senior career*
Years	Team	Apps	(Gls)
2009–2011	De Graafschap	21	(1)
2011–2012	Roda JC	5	(0)
2012–2013	Cambuur	8	(0)
2013	Emmen	0	(0)
2014–2015	Bennekom		
2015–2018	FC Lienden	96	(3)
2018–2020	Sparta Nijkerk	30	(0)
- * Club domestic league appearances and goals

Leon Broekhof (born 14 May 1988) is a Dutch former professional footballer who played as a centre back.

== Club career ==
He came through the Vitesse youth academy and played professionally for De Graafschap, Roda JC and SC Cambuur. In September 2013 he moved to FC Emmen on non-professional terms. In summer 2015, Broekhof joined FC Lienden from fellow amateur side Bennekom.

Broekhof signed for Sparta Nijkerk in April 2018. He retired from football after the 2019–20 season.

== Honours ==
De Graafschap

- Eerste Divisie: 2009–10
