= Jagoš Vuković =

Serbian footballer

Personal information
- Full name: Jagoš Vuković
- Date of birth: 10 June 1988 (age 38)
- Place of birth: Titov Vrbas, SFR Yugoslavia
- Height: 1.95 m (6 ft 5 in)
- Position: Centre-back

Youth career
- Red Star Belgrade

Senior career*
Years	Team	Apps	(Gls)
2005–2006	Red Star Belgrade	1	(0)
2006–2009	Rad	83	(5)
2009–2013	PSV	9	(1)
2011–2012	→ Roda JC (loan)	25	(2)
2013–2014	Vojvodina	9	(0)
2014–2017	Konyaspor	87	(9)
2017–2019	Olympiacos	19	(3)
2018	→ Hellas Verona (loan)	15	(1)
2020–2021	Qingdao FC	25	(1)
2023–2024	IMT	13	(0)
Total		286	(22)

International career^{‡}
2009–2010	Serbia U21	4	(0)
2009–2017	Serbia	8	(0)
- * Club domestic league appearances and goals as of 26 December 2023 ‡ National team caps and goals as of 14 November 2017

Jagoš Vuković (Serbian Cyrillic: Јагош Вуковић, pronounced [jâːɡoʃ ʋûːkoʋitɕ]; born 10 June 1988) is a Serbian retired footballer who last played as a defender for IMT in the Serbian SuperLiga.

Vuković earned eight caps for Serbia from 2009 to 2017.

== Club career ==
Born in Bačko Dobro Polje, a village near Titov Vrbas, Vuković started in Red Star Belgrade's youth academy but lack of first team opportunities prompted a move to Rad in 2006.

On 28 August 2009 it was announced that Vuković would be loaned to PSV Eindhoven, with the prospect of a permanent signing at the end of the season. Vuković made his official debut for PSV on 22 October 2009, in the UEFA Europa League match against Copenhagen, coming on as a substitute for Erik Pieters in the 86th minute of the game. On 22 November 2009, Vuković made his Eredivisie debut in the league game against Heracles Almelo, coming on as a substitute for Erik Pieters in the 77th minute of the game, to only 10 minutes later score his first official goal for PSV with a stunning left-footed long range shot from 21 yards. On 9 April 2010 Vuković, who was playing for PSV on loan from Rad, has signed a three-year deal with the Dutch club.

On 31 August 2013, he made his return to Serbia and signed a two-year contract with Serbian SuperLiga side Vojvodina. On 7 January 2014 he signed with Süper Lig club Konyaspor.

On 13 July 2017, Vuković signed with Greek club Olympiacos. He made only five appearances with the Reds during the first half of the 2017–18 season and was clearly not in the first-team plans of their Spanish manager, Óscar. On 23 January 2018 Vuković moved to Italian club Verona until the end of the season. In the summer of 2018, Vuković returned to Olympiacos and started the season as a first defensive choice for Olympiacos new coach Pedro Martins. On 25 November 2018, he scored with the head his first goal with the club, in the last minute of the game by Kostas Fortounis’ free-kick against rivals Atromitos giving a vital 2–1 away win in his club's effort to win the championship. On early September he terminated his contract with Olympiakos.

On 28 February 2020, Vuković signed with Chinese club Qingdao Huanghai.

== International career ==
Vuković was a member of the Serbia under-21 team at the 2009 UEFA European Under-21 Championship. He also played for the Serbia under-19 team at the 2007 UEFA European Under-19 Championship.

== Career statistics ==
=== Club ===
As of 12 December 2021

Club	Season	League			Cup		Continental		Other		Total	
Club	Season	Division	Apps	Goals	Apps	Goals	Apps	Goals	Apps	Goals	Apps	Goals
Red Star Belgrade	2005–06	Serbian SuperLiga	1	0	2	1	0	0	—		3	1
Rad	2006–07	Serbian SuperLiga	25	2			—				25	2
Rad	2007–08	Serbian SuperLiga	31	1	1	0	—				32	1
Rad	2008–09	Serbian SuperLiga	27	2	1	0	—		—		28	2
Rad	Total		83	5	2	0	—		—		85	5
PSV Eindhoven	2009–10	Eredivisie	5	1	0	0	4	0	—		9	1
PSV Eindhoven	2010–11	Eredivisie	4	0	1	0	4	0	—		9	0
PSV Eindhoven	2012–13	Eredivisie	0	0	1	0	0	0	0	0	1	0
PSV Eindhoven	Total		9	1	2	0	8	0	0	0	19	1
Roda (loan)	2011–12	Eredivisie	25	2	2	0	—		—		27	2
Vojvodina	2013–14	Serbian SuperLiga	9	0	3	0	0	0	—		12	0
Konyaspor	2013–14	Süper Lig	7	1	0	0	—		—		7	1
Konyaspor	2014–15	Süper Lig	21	0	5	1	—		—		26	1
Konyaspor	2015–16	Süper Lig	32	4	8	3	—		—		40	7
Konyaspor	2016–17	Süper Lig	27	4	5	1	4	0	—		36	5
Konyaspor	Total		87	9	18	5	4	0	—		109	14
Olympiacos	2017–18	Super League Greece	1	0	2	0	2	0	—		5	0
Olympiacos	2018–19	Super League Greece	18	3	1	0	9	0	—		28	3
Olympiacos	Total		19	3	3	0	11	0	—		33	3
Verona (loan)	2017–18	Serie A	15	1	0	0	—		—		15	1
Qingdao Huanghai	2020	Chinese Super League	17	1	0	0	—		—		17	1
Qingdao Huanghai	2021	Chinese Super League	8	0	0	0	—		—		8	0
Qingdao Huanghai	Total		25	1	0	0	—		—		25	1
Career total			273	22	32	6	23	0	0	0	328	28

=== International ===
As of 14 November 2017

Serbia
Year	Apps	Goals
2009	2	0
2010	0	0
2011	0	0
2012	0	0
2013	0	0
2014	0	0
2015	0	0
2016	2	0
2017	4	0
Total	8	0

== Honours ==
Konyaspor

- Turkish Cup: 2016–17
