= Jimmy Hempte =

Belgian footballer

Personal information
- Date of birth: 24 March 1982 (age 44)
- Place of birth: Tournai, Belgium
- Height: 1.80 m (5 ft 11 in)
- Position: Left back

Team information
- Current team: CS PV Ostiches (Head coach)

Youth career
- 1987–1996: AS Obigies
- 1996–2002: Excelsior Mouscron

Senior career*
Years	Team	Apps	(Gls)
2002–2004	Gent	36	(0)
2004–2005	Excelsior Mouscron	17	(0)
2005–2010	Kortrijk	128	(8)
2010–2013	Roda JC Kerkrade	65	(5)
2013–2015	KV Oostende	25	(0)
2015–2016	RFC Tournai		
2016–2017	RE Acren		
2017–2019	Gullegem		
2018–2019	Gullegem		
2019–2020	Pays-Blanc Antoinien		

Managerial career
- 2015–2016: RFC Tournai (player-coach)
- 2018–2020: Mouscron (U21)
- 2020–: CS PV Ostiches
- * Club domestic league appearances and goals

Jimmy Hempte (born 24 March 1982 in Tournai) is a Belgium retired footballer who played as a left back and current head coach of CS PV Ostiches.

== Club career ==
He joined R.E. Mouscron in 2004 from K.A.A. Gent.

In the summer of 2010 he left K.V. Kortrijk and signed with Roda JC Kerkrade. After three years he was released and he signed with KV Oostende.

== Coaching and later career ==
In the summer 2015, Hempte joined RFC Tournai. On 14 October 2015, he was promoted to player-head coach at Tournai. He left the club in August 2016.

A few days after leaving Tournai, Hempte joined RE Acren-Lessines as a player, which he played for, for one season.

In the summer 2017, Hempte then joined F.C. Gullegem. In the summer 2018 the club announced, that Hempte had retired and would continue as a youth coach at Royal Excel Mouscron. However, in September, it was reported that he would continue to play for Gullegem alongside his coaching position at Mouscron.

In February 2020, he was appointed head coach of CS Pays Vert Ostiches Ath.
