= Mateusz Prus =

Polish footballer

Personal information
- Full name: Mateusz Prus
- Date of birth: 9 March 1990 (age 36)
- Place of birth: Zamość, Poland
- Height: 1.87 m (6 ft 1 1/2 in)
- Position: Goalkeeper

Youth career
- AMSPN Hetman Zamość
- Amica Wronki

Senior career*
Years	Team	Apps	(Gls)
2007–2009	Hetman Zamość	28	(0)
2010	Zagłębie Sosnowiec	11	(0)
2010–2014	Roda JC Kerkrade	22	(0)
2014–2015	Ruch Chorzów	0	(0)
2015	Chrobry Głogów	3	(0)
2016	Raków Częstochowa	1	(0)
2016–2021	Świt Nowy Dwór Mazowiecki	118	(0)
- * Club domestic league appearances and goals

Mateusz Prus (Polish pronunciation: [maˈtɛ.uʂ ˈprus]; born 9 March 1990) is a Polish former professional footballer who played as a goalkeeper.

== Club career ==
Prus joined Roda in the summer of 2010. He made his Eredivisie debut in February 2011.
