= Milano Koenders =

Dutch footballer (born 1986)

Personal information
- Date of birth: 31 July 1986 (age 40)
- Place of birth: Amsterdam, Netherlands
- Height: 1.83 m (6 ft 0 in)
- Positions: Centre-back; right-back

Team information
- Current team: DWS

Youth career
- –1996: SDZ
- 1996–2006: Ajax

Senior career*
Years	Team	Apps	(Gls)
2006–2007	RKC Waalwijk	30	(0)
2007–2012	AZ Alkmaar	21	(0)
2009	→ NEC (loan)	14	(2)
2010	→ Sparta Rotterdam (loan)	13	(1)
2010–2012	→ NAC Breda (loan)	49	(1)
2012–2015	Heracles Almelo	53	(0)
2016–2017	Concordia Chiajna	18	(1)
2019–	DWS		

International career
2005–2006	Netherlands U20	2	(0)
2006–2007	Netherlands U21	3	(0)
- * Club domestic league appearances and goals as of 10:39, 20 March 2019 (UTC)

Milano Koenders (Dutch pronunciation: [miˈlaːnoː ˈkundərs]; born 31 July 1986) is a Dutch footballer who plays as a centre-back or as a right-back for Tweede Klasse club DWS. Koenders also runs his own football school.

== Club career ==
Koenders is a defender who was born in Amsterdam. He began his career at SDZ before joining the Ajax youth department in 1996. He left Ajax after ten years, in 2006.

Koenders then joined to RKC Waalwijk and made his debut in the professional football in the 2006–07 season, playing 30 matches. After one year, he left the club in 2007, and moved to AZ Alkmaar. There, he would make his European debut as a starter in a 1–1 away draw in the group stage of the UEFA Cup against Zenit Saint Petersburg. In January 2009, he was loaned out to NEC. AZ went on to win the 2008–09 Eredivisie in his absence.

He was once again loaned out in early 2010, this time to Sparta Rotterdam. In the summer of 2010, he signed another loan contract, now at NAC Breda. In 2016, he opened his own football school after being inspired by fellow footballer Nordin Wooter.

In summer 2016, Koenders joined Romanian club Concordia Chiajna for the 2016–17 season.

In May 2019 it was confirmed, that DWS would collaborate with the football school of Koenders. One month later, in June, DWS announced that Koenders also would be playing for the club.

== International career ==
Born in the Netherlands, Koenders is of Surinamese descent. Koenders was member of the Netherlands U21s and played his first game on 14 November 2006 against England U21.

Koenders also represented Suriname in two unofficial matches against W Connection and Curaçao national football team, captaining the team on both occasions.

== Career statistics ==
Appearances and goals by club, season and competition
Club	Season	League			National cup		Continental		Other		Total	
Club	Season	Division	Apps	Goals	Apps	Goals	Apps	Goals	Apps	Goals	Apps	Goals
RKC Waalwijk	2006–07	Eredivisie	30	0	2	0	—		3 (Note: Appearance(s) in Eredivisie play-offs)	0	35	0
AZ	2007–08	Eredivisie	13	0	2	0	2 (Note: Appearance(s) in UEFA Cup)	0	—		17	0
AZ	2008–09	Eredivisie	8	0	2	0	—		—		10	0
AZ	Total		21	0	4	0	2	0	—		27	0
NEC (loan)	2008–09	Eredivisie	14	2	1	0	2	0	—		17	2
Sparta (loan)	2009–10	Eredivisie	13	1	0	0	—		4	0	17	1
NAC Breda (loan)	2010–11	Eredivisie	24	0	4	0	—		—		28	0
NAC Breda (loan)	2011–12	Eredivisie	25	1	1	0	—		—		26	1
NAC Breda (loan)	Total		49	1	5	0	—		—		54	1
Heracles Almelo	2012–13	Eredivisie	23	0	2	0	—		—		25	0
Heracles Almelo	2013–14	Eredivisie	15	0	0	0	—		—		15	0
Heracles Almelo	2014–15	Eredivisie	15	0	2	0	—		—		17	0
Heracles Almelo	Total		53	0	4	0	—		—		57	0
Concordia Chiajna	2016–17	Liga I	18	1	1	0	—		—		19	1
Career total			198	5	17	0	4	0	7	0	226	5

== Honours ==
AZ Alkmaar

- Eredivisie: 2008–09
