= Martijn Monteyne =

Belgian footballer

Personal information
- Date of birth: 12 November 1984 (age 41)
- Place of birth: Roeselare, Belgium
- Height: 1.76 m (5 ft 9 1/2 in)
- Position: Right back

Team information
- Current team: Gullegem

Senior career*
Years	Team	Apps	(Gls)
2001–2007	Roeselare	179	(2)
2007–2011	Germinal Beerschot	117	(1)
2011–2016	Roda JC Kerkrade	91	(0)
2016–2018	Roeselare	1	(0)
2018–	Gullegem		

International career^{‡}
2002–2003	Belgium U19	10	(0)
2004–2006	Belgium U21	4	(0)
- * Club domestic league appearances and goals ‡ National team caps and goals as of 28 May 2016

Martijn Monteyne (born 12 November 1984) is a Belgian football player who currently plays as a right back for Gullegem in the Belgian Second Amateur Division. He formerly played for Germinal Beerschot and Roda JC Kerkrade, before he returned to Roeselare.

== Personal ==
He is the brother of Pieterjan Monteyne.
