= Mikołaj Lebedyński =

Polish footballer (born 1990)

Personal information
- Full name: Mikołaj Lebedyński
- Date of birth: 14 October 1990 (age 36)
- Place of birth: Szczecin, Poland
- Height: 1.85 m (6 ft 1 in)
- Position: Forward

Team information
- Current team: GKS Raciborowice

Youth career
- Arkonia Szczecin
- 2002–2008: Pogoń Szczecin

Senior career*
Years	Team	Apps	(Gls)
2007–2012	Pogoń Szczecin	55	(12)
2011–2012	→ Roda JC (loan)	8	(1)
2012–2013	Roda JC	24	(3)
2013–2014	BK Häcken	8	(1)
2014	Podbeskidzie Bielsko-Biała	5	(0)
2014–2018	Wisła Płock	55	(16)
2016–2017	→ GKS Katowice (loan)	27	(3)
2018	→ Górnik Łęczna (loan)	13	(0)
2019–2022	Chrobry Głogów	111	(30)
2022–2023	Stal Mielec	27	(0)
2023–2025	Chrobry Głogów	64	(14)
2025–2026	Świt Szczecin	30	(3)
2026–	GKS Raciborowice	0	(0)

International career
	Poland U17	3	(0)
2010	Poland U21	1	(0)
- * Club domestic league appearances and goals as of 19:02, 31 May 2026 (UTC)

Mikołaj Lebedyński (Polish pronunciation: [miˈkɔwaj lɛbɛˈdɨj̃skʲi]; born 14 October 1990) is a Polish professional footballer who plays as a forward for IV liga Lower Silesia GKS Raciborowice.

== Club career ==
After going through the youth departments of hometown clubs Arkonia and Pogoń, Lebedyński was promoted to the senior team of the latter in 2007. In his first season as a regular, he played 1014 minutes in which he scored seven goals.

In August 2011, Lebedyński joined Dutch Eredivisie club Roda JC Kerkrade on a one-year loan. He made a permanent transfer in the summer of 2012 and played 24 matches in which he scored three goals. As he could not impress, he was released in July 2013.
