= Frank van Kouwen =

Dutch footballer (born 1980)

Personal information
- Date of birth: 2 July 1980 (age 46)
- Place of birth: Weert, Netherlands
- Height: 1.81 m (5 ft 11 in)
- Positions: Centre-back; defensive midfielder

Youth career
- Megacles
- Willem II

Senior career*
| Years | Team | Apps | (Gls) |
| 1998–2004 | Willem II | 4 | (0) |
| 2003–2004 | → Eindhoven (loan) | 33 | (3) |
| 2004–2007 | VVV-Venlo | 104 | (6) |
| 2007–2008 | Roda JC | 8 | (0) |
| 2008–2011 | VVV-Venlo | 61 | (4) |
| 2011–2012 | FC Eindhoven | 17 | (0) |
| 2012–2014 | De Graafschap | 27 | (0) |
| 2014–2015 | De Treffers | 12 | (0) |
| Total | | 266 | (13) |
- * Club domestic league appearances and goals

Frank van Kouwen (born 2 July 1980) is a Dutch former professional footballer who plays as a centre-back or defensive midfielder for Willem II, Roda JC, VVV-Venlo, FC Eindhoven, De Graafschap and De Treffers.

== Career ==
Van Kouwen was born in Weert, Limburg. He started playing football in the youth ranks of local amateur club Megacles. He was soon picked up by Willem II, where he started in the youth. In the 1998–99 season, he made his debut in the first team. Van Kouwen almost never played, and in the 2003–04 season, he played on loan for FC Eindhoven. In this period Van Kouwen showed potential, and was signed by VVV-Venlo in the following season.

Being a regular started for VVV, there was a lot of interest from bigger clubs. Of these, he chose to play for Roda JC who played in the Eredivisie, but again he was not sure of being in the starting lineup. He therefore returned to VVV in 2008. After one season, playing in the second division, he and VVV promoted to the Eredivisie.
