= Mads Junker =

Danish footballer (born 1981)

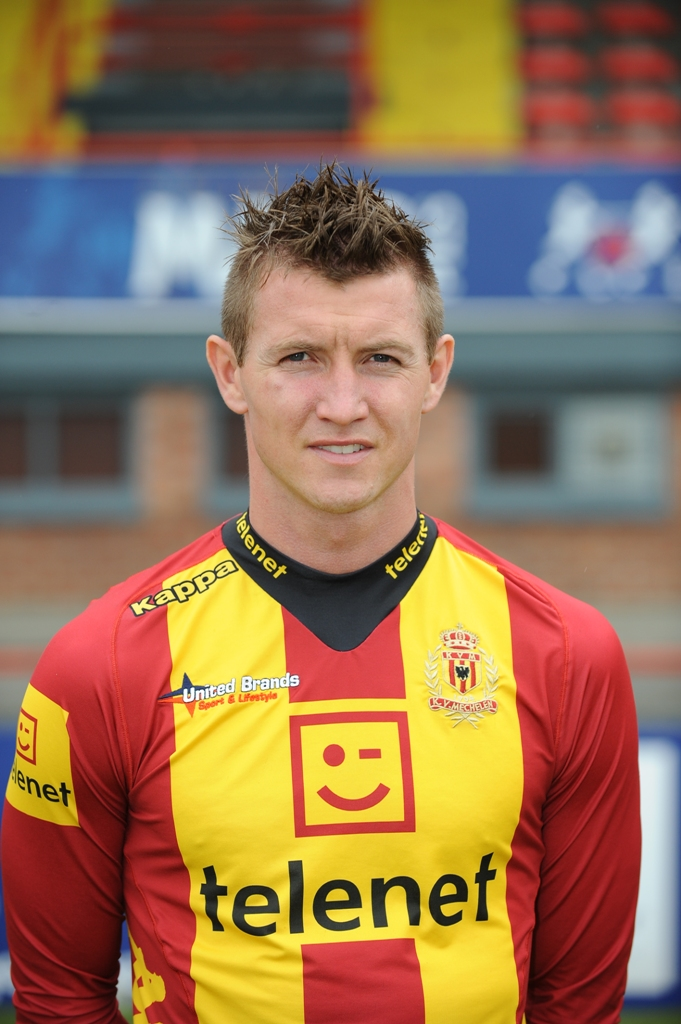
- Junker with Mechelen in 2012

Personal information
- Date of birth: 21 April 1981 (age 45)
- Place of birth: Copenhagen, Denmark
- Height: 1.86 m (6 ft 1 in)
- Position: Striker

Youth career
- Humlebæk
- Helsingør
- Oure
- Svendborg fb

Senior career*
Years	Team	Apps	(Gls)
1999–2002	Lyngby	23	(4)
2000–2001	→ Fremad Amager (loan)	27	(16)
2002–2003	Brøndby	11	(0)
2003–2004	Ølstykke	30	(23)
2004–2006	Nordsjælland	52	(28)
2006–2010	Vitesse	86	(18)
2009–2010	→ Roda JC (loan)	38	(23)
2010–2012	Roda JC	68	(27)
2012–2014	Mechelen	56	(10)
2014–2015	Delhi Dynamos FC	14	(3)
Total		405	(152)

International career
2000–2001	Denmark U19	2	(1)
2002	Denmark U20	5	(0)
2000–2001	Denmark U21	6	(0)
2006–2012	Denmark	7	(1)
- * Club domestic league appearances and goals

Mads Junker (born 21 April 1981) is a Danish football pundit and former footballer who played as a striker. He played seven matches for the Denmark national team.

During his career, and increasingly after his retirement in 2015, Junker worked as a pundit and commentator for DR and TV 2.

== Club career ==
Born in Copenhagen, Junker made his debut in the Danish Superliga in 2000, playing for Lyngby BK while attending High School on the side. Although attracting attention from abroad, he signed with Brøndby IF in December 2001 on a four-year contract. Due to financial difficulties in Lyngby BK he was allowed to leave on a free transfer. Junker was never a great success, and he was allowed to go on loan to First Division side Ølstykke FC. Junker did not fit into the 4–2–3–1 system favoured by Brøndby manager Michael Laudrup and in 2004; he was sold to FC Nordsjælland.

=== Nordsjælland ===
At FC Nordsjælland Junker got off to a flying start, scoring 11 goals in the first half of the season. During the last half, however, he only managed to score twice.

In his second season, he was caught red-handed cheating his teammates in a series of poker games. In total, Junker swindled his teammates out of 100.000–150.000 DKK. Junker said his desire to win had caused him to use dishonest means, and stated that the incident had taught him a lesson as well as cost him a few friendships. As punishment, he was replaced as vice-captain by Kim Christensen.

After the gambling incident Junker became increasingly modest, always praising team performance instead of personal ability. Whether this had an influence is unknown, but Junker finally found the stability that had been lacking. Citing the 4–4–2 system and his team as a major factor, Junker scored 15 goals in the first half of the season, thus once again attracting attention from abroad.

=== Vitesse ===
During the winter break, Junker signed with Eredivisie side Vitesse for a fee of DKK 10 million as a replacement for Matthew Amoah. He made his debut against Feyenoord, but had to be substituted during the second half due to a hip injury. Junker scored his first goal in the home game against SC Heerenveen. In total, he managed 9 goals for Vitesse in the second half of the 2004–05 season.

During his first season in Vitesse, Junker was asked for advice when Vitesse looked into the possibility of signing his former teammate from Nordsjælland, Anders Due. Vitesse signed Due for a fee of DKK 10 million in July 2006.

During the beginning of his second season Junker lost his first team spot to Anduele Pryor. Junker, not happy with the situation, spoke to the media about the possibility of leaving the club. During the winter transfer window, Junker was about to sign with FC Utrecht, but Vitesse cancelled the deal on the last day of the transfer window, as the club feared playing with only three strikers for the rest of the season.

After the end of the 2006–07 season, Utrecht were reportedly still interested, but Vitesse refused to sell the player who was supposed to have a greater role in the upcoming season.

=== Roda JC ===
In July 2010, Junker signed with Roda JC. The season before, he had already played for the club on loan, in which he scored 21 league goals in 34 matches.

=== Mechelen ===
In June 2012, Junker signed with Belgian club Mechelen.

=== Delhi Dynamos ===
In July 2014, Junker signed for the Indian Super League side Delhi Dynamos FC and he wore the No. 9 jersey for the club. Junker made his first appearance in the Indian Super League for Delhi Dynamos FC on 14 October 2014 vs. FC Pune City. He scored his first goal (which was the first headed goal in the Indian Super League) against Chennaiyin FC on 25 October at the Jawaharlal Nehru Stadium, New Delhi.

== International career ==
Junker made his first appearance for the Danish national team on 16 August 2006 in a friendly against Poland, when he replaced Nicklas Bendtner in the 67' minute. Before this he had played 6 games for the U-21 team, 5 games for the U-20 team and 2 games for the U-19 team.

== Media career ==
Junker began working as a football pundit on Danish television during his active career as a player. He became a commentator for TV 2 in 2019 for their new channel, TV 2 Sport X.

After 7 years at TV2, he moved to Disney+ Denmark, where he played a central role in their coverage of La Liga.

== International goals ==
Scores and results list Denmark's goal tally first.

#	Date	Venue	Opponent	Score	Result	Competition
1	11 August 2010	Copenhagen, Denmark	Germany	2–2	2–2	Friendly match
