= Mark Looms =

Dutch footballer

Personal information
- Full name: Mark Looms
- Date of birth: 24 March 1981 (age 45)
- Place of birth: Almelo, Netherlands
- Height: 1.92 m (6 ft 4 in)
- Position: Left back

Youth career
- Luctor et Emergo
- FC Twente

Senior career*
Years	Team	Apps	(Gls)
2000–2012	Heracles Almelo	321	(9)
2012–2013	NAC Breda	8	(0)
Total		329	(9)

Managerial career
- 2013–2014: Luctor et Emergo (Assistant)
- 2014: HSC '21 (Assistant)
- 2014–2018: PEC Zwolle (Youth)
- 2018−2020: PEC Zwolle U21
- 2020–2022: FC Twente / Heracles Academy
- 2022–2023: FC Emmen (Youth)
- 2023–2025: DETO Twenterand
- 2025–2026: SV Urk
- * Club domestic league appearances and goals

Mark Looms (Dutch pronunciation: [ˈmɑr(ə)k ˈloːms], born 24 March 1981) is a Dutch football manager and former professional footballer who played as a left back.

Looms made his debut in professional football in the 2000–01 season, when he played for Heracles Almelo. After having played twelve years for Heracles, Looms wanted to have a new challenge and signed with NAC Breda in the summer of 2012. Because of a severe hip injury, Looms had to end his professional career in November 2013, having made only eight appearances for NAC.

== Honours ==
Heracles Almelo

- Eerste Divisie: 2004–05
