= Marko Vejinović =

Dutch footballer (born 1990)

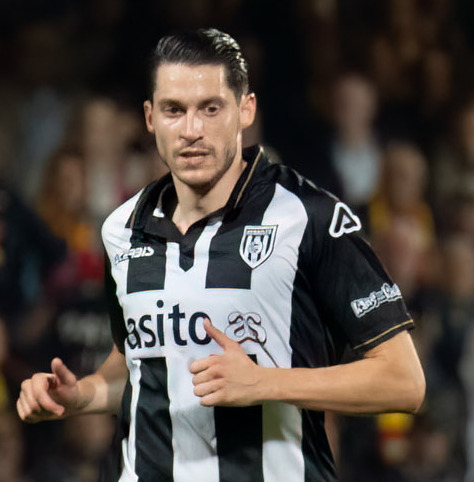
- Vejinović with Heracles Almelo in 2023

Personal information
- Date of birth: 3 February 1990 (age 36)
- Place of birth: Amsterdam, Netherlands
- Height: 1.86 m (6 ft 1 in)
- Position: Midfielder

Team information
- Current team: Feyenoord Academy (coach)

Youth career
- Zeeburgia
- Ajax
- Utrecht
- AZ

Senior career*
Years	Team	Apps	(Gls)
2007–2009	AZ	3	(0)
2009–2013	Heracles Almelo	98	(11)
2013–2015	Vitesse	61	(12)
2015–2017	Feyenoord	25	(0)
2017–2019	AZ	11	(0)
2019	→ Arka Gdynia (loan)	14	(5)
2019–2020	Arka Gdynia	24	(8)
2021	ADO Den Haag	17	(0)
2021–2022	Tianjin Jinmen Tiger	8	(1)
2022–2024	Heracles Almelo	56	(4)
Total		317	(41)

International career
2006–2007	Netherlands U17	8	(2)
2007–2009	Netherlands U19	17	(6)
2011	Netherlands U21	2	(0)

Managerial career
- 2024–: Feyenoord Academy
- * Club domestic league appearances and goals

Marko Vejinović (born 3 February 1990) is a Dutch professional football coach and a former central midfielder. He works as a coach at the Feyenoord Academy. Having started his professional career with AZ, with whom he won the Dutch Championship, he went on to play for Heracles Almelo, Vitesse, Feyenoord, AZ, Arka Gdynia, ADO Den Haag and Tianjin Jinmen Tiger.

== Club career ==
Vejinović started playing football at the age of seven at a small Dutch club by the name of Zeeburgia. Ajax scouts immediately recognized his talent, where he consequently spent the next seven years playing for the youth team at Ajax. He continued his career later at FC Utrecht and then at AZ Alkmaar.

Vejinović made his debut in the Eredivisie with AZ on 22 March 2009, in a 0–0 draw at home against Feyenoord. AZ won the league championship that season.

After he refused to extend his contract, he left Heracles Almelo as a free agent in summer 2013.

Vejinović returned to Heracles on 4 July 2022, signing a two-year contract with an option for an additional year. On 24 June 2024, Heracles announced that Vejinović decided to end his playing career and become a coach at the Feyenoord Academy.

== International career ==
Of Bosnian Serb descent, Vejinović is eligible to play for the Netherlands, Bosnia and Herzegovina, and Serbia.

On 2 November 2015, he was called up to the provisional senior Netherlands squad for friendlies against Wales and Germany. The following day he stated he was unsure whether he would accept the invitation. On 9 November 2015, having chosen to accept the invitation, he said he never doubted his choice.

== Personal life ==
Vejinović is a Dutch citizen of Bosnian Serb descent. In 2015, he married a Dutch woman named Sophie.

== Career statistics ==
Appearances and goals by club, season and competition
Club	Season	League			National cup (Note: Includes KNVB Cup, Chinese FA Cup)		Continental		Other		Total	
Club	Season	Division	Apps	Goals	Apps	Goals	Apps	Goals	Apps	Goals	Apps	Goals
AZ	2008–09	Eredivisie	3	0	1	0	—		—		4	0
Heracles Almelo	2009–10	Eredivisie	26	3	3	0	—		2	0	31	3
Heracles Almelo	2010–11	Eredivisie	27	2	1	0	—		2	0	30	2
Heracles Almelo	2011–12	Eredivisie	20	2	4	2	—		—		24	4
Heracles Almelo	2012–13	Eredivisie	25	4	2	1	—		—		27	5
Heracles Almelo	Total		98	11	10	3	—		4	0	112	14
Vitesse	2013–14	Eredivisie	30	2	3	0	1 (Note: Appearance in UEFA Europa League)	0	2	0	36	2
Vitesse	2014–15	Eredivisie	31	10	4	1	—		4	2	39	13
Vitesse	Total		61	12	7	1	1	0	6	2	75	15
Feyenoord	2015–16	Eredivisie	23	0	3	0	—		—		26	0
Feyenoord	2016–17	Eredivisie	2	0	2	1	1	0	0	0	5	1
Feyenoord	Total		25	0	5	1	1	0	0	0	31	1
AZ	2017–18	Eredivisie	7	0	1	0	—		—		8	0
AZ	2018–19	Eredivisie	4	0	1	0	0	0	—		5	0
AZ	2019–20	Eredivisie	0	0	—		0	0	—		0	0
AZ	Total		11	0	2	0	0	0	—		13	0
Arka Gdynia (loan)	2018–19	Ekstraklasa	14	5	—		—		—		14	5
Arka Gdynia	2019–20	Ekstraklasa	24	8	0	0	—		—		24	8
Arka Gdynia	Total		38	13	0	0	—		—		38	13
ADO Den Haag	2020–21	Eredivisie	17	0	0	0	—		—		17	0
Tianjin Jinmen Tiger	2021	Chinese Super League	8	1	2	0	—		—		10	1
Heracles Almelo	2022–23	Eerste Divisie	31	3	0	0	—		—		31	3
Heracles Almelo	2023–24	Eredivisie	25	1	1	0	—		—		26	1
Heracles Almelo	Total		56	4	1	0	—		—		57	4
Career total			317	41	28	5	2	0	10	2	357	48

== Honours ==
AZ

- Eredivisie: 2008–09

Feyenoord

- Eredivisie: 2016–17
- KNVB Cup: 2015–16
