= Mark-Jan Fledderus =

Dutch footballer (born 1982)

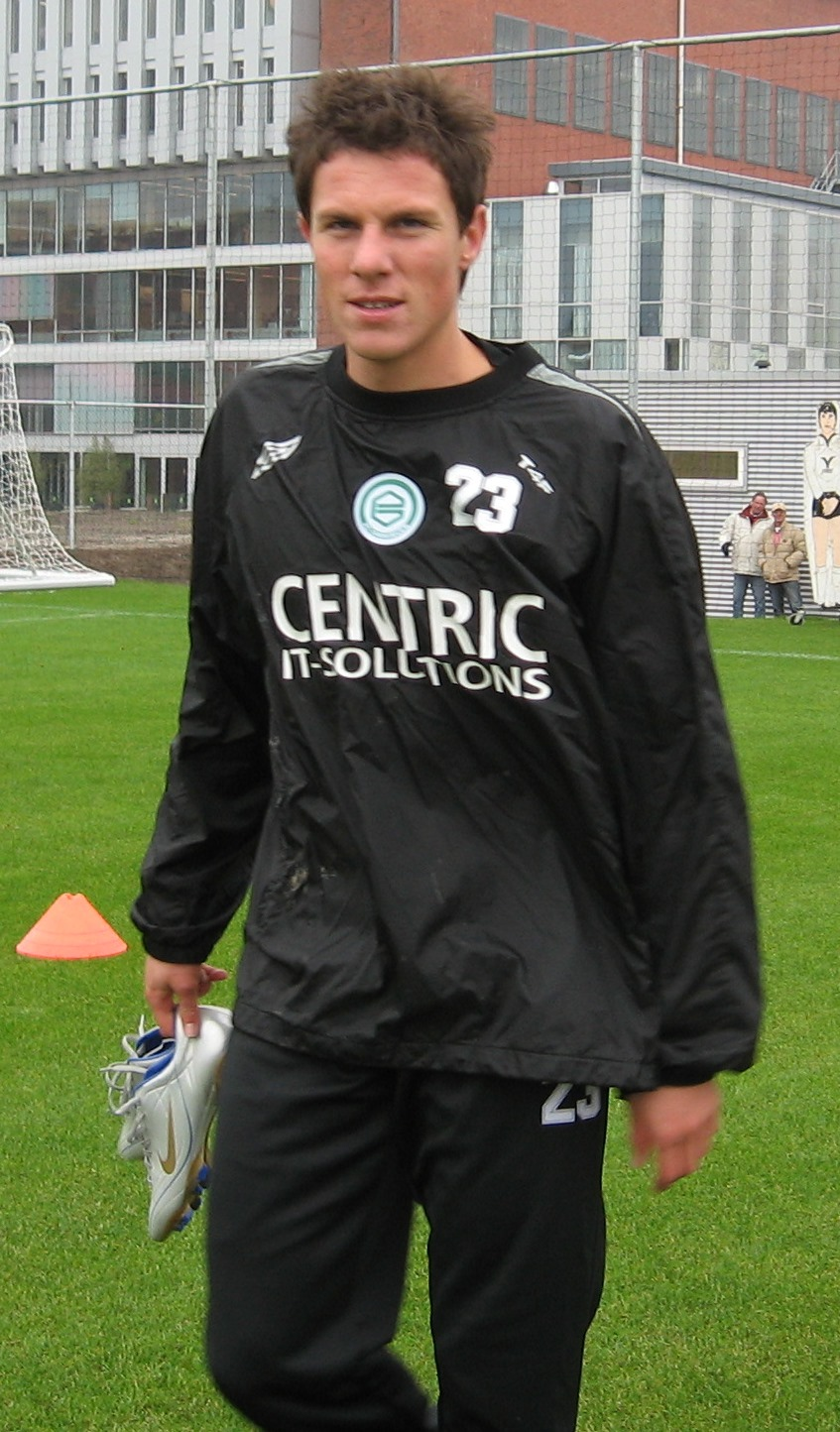
- Fledderus with Groningen

Personal information
- Date of birth: 14 December 1982 (age 43)
- Place of birth: Coevorden, Netherlands
- Height: 1.78 m (5 ft 10 in)
- Position: Midfielder

Team information
- Current team: Como 1907 (director)

Youth career
- CSVC Coevorden
- Emmen

Senior career*
Years	Team	Apps	(Gls)
2002–2004	Heerenveen	5	(0)
2004	→ Stormvogels Telstar (loan)	10	(0)
2004–2008	Groningen	88	(9)
2008–2011	Heracles	72	(10)
2011–2014	Roda JC	79	(10)
2014–2017	Heracles	67	(3)
Total		321	(32)
- * Club domestic league appearances and goals

Mark-Jan Fledderus (Dutch pronunciation: [mɑr(ə)k ˈjɑɱ flɛˈdeːrʏs]; born 14 December 1982) is a Dutch former professional footballer and current football executive, who worked as technical director of FC Groningen. Under his supervision, FC Groningen was relegated to the Keukenkampioen Divisie in 2023. During his playing career, he mainly appeared as a midfielder.

== Playing career ==
A free-kick specialist, the left-sided midfielder made his professional debut for SC Heerenveen and played for Stormvogels Telstar and FC Groningen before joining Roda JC Kerkrade on a free in 2011. He returned to his former team Heracles in 2014. After retiring, he was lured back by former Groningen chairman Hans Nijland to come and play for amateur side HSC Sappemeer, but Fledderus was withdrawn from the squad after an on-field incident in his first match for the club.

== Post-playing career ==
Fledderus retired from playing football in summer 2017 and joined Heracles' board of directors as an assistant to general manager Nico Jan Hoogma.

In 2019 Fledderus joined FC Groningen as technical director. After being fired in 2023 due to poor results in the Eredivisie he became technical manager at the Eredivisie CV in July 2023. In March 2024 the Eredivisie CV decided not to continue with Mark-Jan Fledderus.

He was named strategical director at Italian side Como 1907 in 2025.
