= Bart Biemans =

Belgian footballer (born 1988)

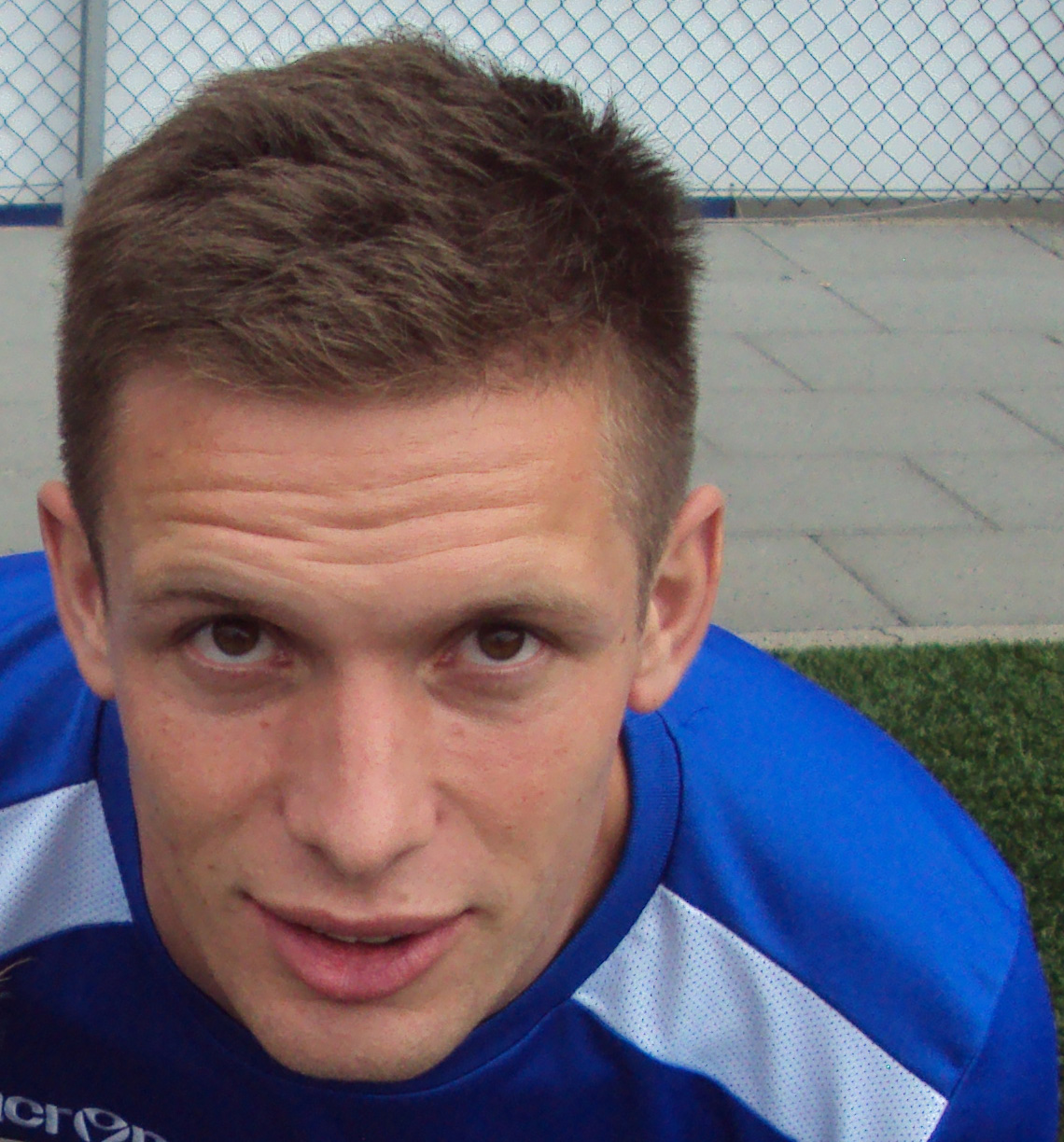

Personal information
- Date of birth: 14 March 1988 (age 38)
- Place of birth: Neerpelt, Belgium
- Height: 1.83 m (6 ft 0 in)
- Position: Centre back

Team information
- Current team: Wezel Sport

Youth career
- Hamont
- Lommel
- Eindhoven
- 2005–2008: Willem II

Senior career*
Years	Team	Apps	(Gls)
2008–2011	Willem II	69	(6)
2011–2016	Roda JC Kerkrade	118	(10)
2016	→ FC Den Bosch (loan)	15	(4)
2016–2018	FC Den Bosch	57	(2)
2018–2019	Knokke	20	(0)
2019–2021	FC Eindhoven	50	(3)
2021–	Wezel Sport	0	(0)

International career^{‡}
2004	Belgium U16	8	(0)
2004	Belgium U17	7	(0)
2005–2006	Belgium U18	14	(0)
2009	Belgium U21	1	(0)
- * Club domestic league appearances and goals as of 12 May 2021 ‡ National team caps and goals as of 3 March 2010 (UTC)

Bart Biemans (born 14 March 1988) is a Belgian professional footballer who plays as a centre back for Wezel Sport.

== Career ==
Playing for K.VV. Hamontlo (2923), K.F.C. Lommel S.K. (1986) and FC Eindhoven in his youth years, Biemans joined Willem II in 2005. Biemans played for several Willem II youth squads and became captain of the Willem II Reserve squad in 2008. Because of many injuries with defensive players like Danny Schenkel, Rens van Eijden and Angelo Martha, he made his debut in the lost away-match against AZ.

After a three-year at Willem II, he signed to a two-year plus an option year contract with Roda JC on 22 June 2011. Though his had contract expired in 2014, and he had actually left the club after it, Biemans signed a new two-year deal in August 2014.
