= Harm van Veldhoven =

Dutch-Belgian football manager (born 1962)

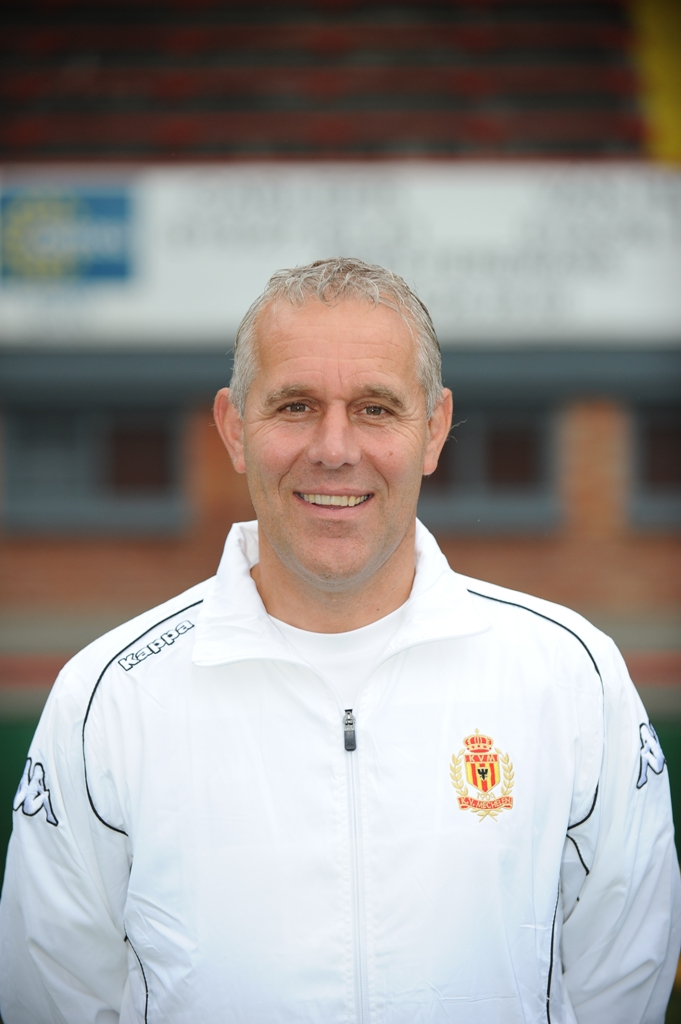
- Harm van Veldhoven as K.V. Mechelen manager in July 2012

Personal information
- Date of birth: 28 September 1962 (age 64)
- Place of birth: Luyksgestel, Netherlands
- Positions: Striker; midfielder; defender

Youth career
- 1968–1979: De Raven Luyksgestel

Senior career*
Years	Team	Apps	(Gls)
1979–1985	Lommel	212	(54)
1985–1990	Germinal Ekeren	218	(64)
1990–1992	RWDM	78	(30)
1992–1999	Lommel	248	(58)

Managerial career
- 1999–2000: Lommel (assistant manager)
- 2000–2003: Lommel
- 2003–2004: Brussels
- 2004–2007: Cercle Brugge
- 2007–2008: Germinal Beerschot
- 2008–2012: Roda JC
- 2012–2013: KV Mechelen
- 2014–2015: Delhi Dynamos
- 2015–2018: K.V.C. Westerlo
- * Club domestic league appearances and goals as of 15 June 2009 ‡ National team caps and goals as of 15 June 2009

Harm van Veldhoven (born 28 September 1962) is a Dutch-Belgian football manager and former player.
