= Willie Overtoom =

Cameroonian footballer (born 1986)

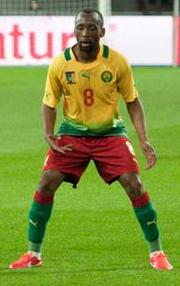
- Overtoom playing for Cameroon in 2013

Personal information
- Full name: William Steve Overtoom
- Date of birth: 2 September 1986 (age 40)
- Place of birth: Nanga Eboko, Cameroon
- Height: 1.70 m (5 ft 7 in)
- Position: Attacking midfielder

Youth career
- Victoria Obdam
- AZ

Senior career*
Years	Team	Apps	(Gls)
2005–2007	AZ	0	(0)
2006–2007	→ Telstar (loan)	9	(0)
2007–2008	HVV Hollandia	23	(6)
2008–2013	Heracles Almelo	144	(39)
2013–2014	AZ	17	(1)
2015–2016	Zulte Waregem	5	(0)
2016–2017	Al-Shamal	12	(8)

International career
2012–2013	Cameroon	3	(0)
- * Club domestic league appearances and goals

Willie Overtoom (born 2 September 1986) is a Cameroonian former professional footballer who played as an attacking midfielder.

== Early life ==
The son of a Dutch father and a Cameroonian mother, Overtoom lived the first three years of his life in Cameroon before moving to the Netherlands. Overtoom holds a Dutch passport.

== Club career ==
Overtoom started playing football at amateur side Victoria Obdam and became an exponent of the AZ youth academy at the age of 13. During the 2006–07 season, Overtoom was sent on loan to Telstar, where he played nine matches in the Eerste Divisie. After his expiring contract was not extended, he started playing for Hoofdklasse side Hollandia. He impressed during the season and was able to sign with Eredivisie side Heracles Almelo the following season. He became an important player for the side from Almelo, where he spent four and a half years, before returning to his former team AZ in January 2013. However, his move did not become a success. On 28 August 2014, it was announced that Overtoom had left the club as a free agent, having only played 17 Eredivisie matches.

== International career ==
Overtoom played for several Netherlands national youth squads without receiving an invitation for the senior national team. In 2011, he announced the application for a Cameroonian passport so he would be granted permission to represent Cameroon national team. On 15 March 2012, Overtoom received his first call-up to the Indomitable Lions.

He made his international debut in a friendly match against Guinea national football team on 26 May 2012.

== Honours ==
AZ Alkmaar

- KNVB Cup: 2012–13
