= 1997 Johan Cruyff Shield =

Johan Cruijff Schaal II
PSV Eindhoven	Roda JC
3	1
- Date: 17 August 1997
- Venue: Amsterdam Arena, Amsterdam
- Referee: Dick Jol
- Attendance: 15,000

The second edition of the Johan Cruyff Shield (Dutch: Johan Cruijff Schaal) was held on 17 August 1997 at the Amsterdam Arena in Amsterdam. It featured the 1996–97 Eredivisie champions, PSV Eindhoven, and the 1996–97 KNVB Cup winners, Roda JC. PSV won the match 3–1, with two goals from Phillip Cocu and a goal from Gilles De Bilde; Peter Van Houdt scored for Roda JC.

== Match details ==
17 August 1997

PSV Eindhoven	3–1	Roda JC
Cocu 22', 90+1'; De Bilde 90+2'	Report	Van Houdt 84'

Amsterdam Arena, Amsterdam
Attendance: 15,000
Referee: Dick Jol

PSV Eindhoven	Roda JC

GK	1	(Germany) Georg Koch
RB	2	(Brazil) Vampeta	Booked
CB	3	(Netherlands) Jaap Stam
CB	4	(Netherlands) Stan Valckx
LB	5	(Netherlands) Arthur Numan (c)
RM	7	(Federal Republic of Yugoslavia) Željko Petrović
CM	6	(Netherlands) Wim Jonk
CM	8	(Netherlands) Phillip Cocu
LM	11	(Netherlands) Boudewijn Zenden
CF	15	(Belgium) Marc Degryse		(substituted off) 77'
CF	12	(Netherlands) Arnold Bruggink		(substituted off) 66'
Substitutes:
FW	9	(Belgium) Gilles De Bilde		(substituted in) 66'
MF	18	(Slovakia) Igor Demo		(substituted in) 77'
Manager:
(Netherlands) Dick Advocaat

GK	1	(Federal Republic of Yugoslavia) Nikola Damjanac
RB	2	(Netherlands) Ger Senden (c)	Booked
CB	3	(Netherlands) Regillio Vrede
CB	4	(Belgium) Maarten Schops		(substituted off) 70'
LB	5	(Netherlands) Ramon van Haaren
RM	14	(Netherlands) Melvin Plet		(substituted off) 74'
CM	6	(Netherlands) André Ooijer
CM	8	(Netherlands) Arno Doomernik
LM	11	(Belgium) Jan-Pieter Martens		(substituted off) 82'
CF	9	(Belgium) Peter Van Houdt
CF	19	(Belgium) Bob Peeters
Substitutes:
DF	15	(Belgium) Joos Valgaeren		(substituted in) 70'
MF	7	(Netherlands) Eric van der Luer		(substituted in) 74'
FW	22	(Netherlands) Edwin Grünholz		(substituted in) 82'
Manager:
(Netherlands) Martin Jol
