= 2000 Johan Cruyff Shield =

Johan Cruijff Schaal V
PSV Eindhoven	Roda JC
2	0
- Date: 13 August 2000
- Venue: Amsterdam Arena, Amsterdam
- Referee: Ruud Bossen
- Attendance: 28,000

The fifth edition of the Johan Cruyff Shield (Dutch: Johan Cruijff Schaal) was held on 13 August 2000 between 1999–2000 Eredivisie champions PSV Eindhoven and 1999–2000 KNVB Cup winners Roda JC. PSV won the match 2–0.

== Match ==
=== Details ===
13 August 2000

PSV Eindhoven	2–0	Roda JC
Ramzi 29'; Faber 44'

Amsterdam Arena, Amsterdam
Attendance: 28,000
Referee: Ruud Bossen

PSV Eindhoven	Roda JC

GK	23	(Netherlands) Ronald Waterreus
RB	2	(Netherlands) André Ooijer		(substituted off) 35'
CB	21	(Russia) Yuriy Nikiforov	Booked
CB	29	(Netherlands) Kevin Hofland	Booked
LB	5	(Denmark) Jan Heintze
RM	7	(Morocco) Adil Ramzi		(substituted off) 82'
CM	6	(Netherlands) Mark van Bommel (c)	Booked
CM	14	(Switzerland) Johann Vogel
LM	22	(Netherlands) Wilfred Bouma
SS	10	(Netherlands) Arnold Bruggink		(substituted off) 80'
CF	9	(Federal Republic of Yugoslavia) Mateja Kežman
Substitutes:
DF	4	(Netherlands) Ernest Faber		(substituted on) 35'
MF	15	(Netherlands) John de Jong		(substituted on) 80'
MF	19	(Denmark) Dennis Rommedahl		(substituted on) 82'
Manager:
(Belgium) Eric Gerets

GK	1	(Australia) Zeljko Kalac
RB	2	(Netherlands) Ger Senden
CB	20	(Netherlands) Humphrey Rudge
CB	22	(Netherlands) Mark Luijpers	Booked
LB	5	(Netherlands) Ramon van Haaren
RM	14	(Belgium) Kevin van Dessel
CM	6	(Belgium) Sven Vandenbroeck		(substituted off) 66'
CM	8	(Netherlands) Eric van der Luer (c)	Booked
LM	9	(Belgium) Tom Soetaers
CF	19	(Belgium) Bob Peeters		(substituted off) 79'
CF	7	(Cameroon) Bernard Tchoutang		(substituted off) 79'
Substitutes:
DF	13	(Croatia) Igor Tomašić		(substituted on) 66'
FW	18	(Netherlands) Dave Zafarin		(substituted on) 79'
FW	10	(Hungary) Gábor Torma		(substituted on) 79'
Manager:
(Netherlands) Sef Vergoossen
