= 1997 KNVB Cup final =

- Event: 1996–97 KNVB Cup
Roda JC	Heerenveen
4	2
- Date: 8 May 1997
- Venue: De Kuip, Rotterdam
- Man of the Match: Eric van der Luer (Roda JC)
- Referee: Hans Reygwart
- Attendance: 48,000

The 1997 KNVB Cup final was a football match between Roda JC and Heerenveen on 8 May 1997 at De Kuip, Rotterdam. It was the final match of the 1996–97 KNVB Cup competition and the 79th KNVB Cup final. Roda won 4–2 after goals from Gerald Sibon, Ger Senden, Eric van der Luer and Maarten Schops. It was the side's first KNVB Cup trophy.

== Route to the final ==
Roda JC		Round	Heerenveen	
Opponent	Result	Group stage	Opponent	Result
Bye		Matchday 1	Cambuur Leeuwarden	5–0 (H)
Bye		Matchday 2	SV Urk	3–1 (A)
Bye		Matchday 3	VV Sneek	6–3 (A)
Bye		Final standings	Group 2 winner: Team / Pld / W / D / L / GF / GA / GD / Pts; Heerenveen / 3 / 3 / 0 / 0 / 14 / 4 / +10 / 9; Cambuur Leeuwarden / 3 / 2 / 0 / 1 / 10 / 8 / +2 / 6; SV Urk / 3 / 1 / 0 / 2 / 5 / 11 / −6 / 3; VV Sneek / 3 / 0 / 0 / 3 / 6 / 12 / −6 / 0	
Opponent	Result	Knockout stage	Opponent	Result
VV Katwijk	6–2 (H)	First round	TOP Oss	3–2 (a.e.t.) (H)
De Graafschap	2–0 (A)	Round of 16	NEC	2–0 (H)
FC Zwolle	5–0 (A)	Quarter-finals	Feyenoord	2–1 (H)
Willem II	1–0 (H)	Semi-finals	Helmond Sport	5–0 (H)

== Match ==
=== Details ===
8 May 1997
18:00 CEST

Roda JC	4–2	Heerenveen
Sibon 4'; Senden 16'; Van der Luer 48'; Schops 56'	Report	Korneev 12'; Talan 83'

De Kuip, Rotterdam
Attendance: 48,000
Referee: Hans Reygwart

Roda JC	Heerenveen

GK	1	(Netherlands) Ruud Hesp (c)
RB	2	(Netherlands) Ger Senden
CB	3	(Netherlands) Regillio Vrede	(yellow card) 26'
CB	4	(Belgium) Maarten Schops
LB	5	(Netherlands) Ramon van Haaren		(substituted off) 89'
RM	6	(Netherlands) André Ooijer
CM	7	(Netherlands) Eric van der Luer		(substituted off) 76'
LM	8	(Netherlands) Arno Doomernik	(yellow card) 54'
RW	9	(Belgium) Peter Van Houdt
CF	10	(Netherlands) Gerald Sibon
LW	11	(Nigeria) Garba Lawal		(substituted off) 69'
Substitutes:
GK	16	(Netherlands) Hans Spillmann
DF	13	(Netherlands) Henri Heeren
DF	18	(Netherlands) Mark Luijpers		(substituted on) 89'
MF	12	(Belgium) Jan-Pieter Martens		(substituted on) 69'
MF	14	(Netherlands) Melvin Plet
MF	15	(Belgium) Stéphane Van Der Heyden		(substituted on) 76'
FW	17	(Netherlands) Arie Obdam
Manager:
(Netherlands) Martin Jol

GK	1	(South Africa) Hans Vonk
RB	2	(Denmark) Ole Tobiasen
CB	4	(Netherlands) Johan Hansma (c)
LB	5	(Netherlands) Tom Sier		(substituted off) 70'
CM	6	(Netherlands) Alex Pastoor		(substituted off) 64'
CM	3	(Netherlands) Jan de Visser
AM	8	(Russia) Igor Korneev
AM	10	(Denmark) Jon Dahl Tomasson
RW	7	(Netherlands) Jeffrey Talan	(yellow card) 90+2'
CF	9	(Netherlands) Leeroy Echteld
LW	11	(Netherlands) Boudewijn Pahlplatz		(substituted off) 56'
Substitutes:
GK	16	(Netherlands) Sierk Kooistra
DF	13	(Norway) Børre Meinseth		(substituted on) 64'
DF	17	(Netherlands) Tieme Klompe
MF	14	(Netherlands) Ronnie Pander
MF	18	(Netherlands) Max Houttuin
FW	12	(Netherlands) Romeo Wouden		(substituted on) 56'
FW	15	(Denmark) Marc Nygaard		(substituted on) 70'
Manager:
(Netherlands) Foppe de Haan

Man of the match

- Eric van der Luer (Roda JC)

Match officials

- Assistant referees:
  - Jan Rijser
- Fourth official: Harry van Beek

Match rules

- 90 minutes.
- 30 minutes of extra-time if necessary.
- Penalty shoot-out if scores still level.
- Seven named substitutes.
- Maximum of three substitutions.
