= 2000 KNVB Cup final =

- Event: 1999–2000 KNVB Cup
| NEC | Roda JC |
| 0 | 2 |
- Date: 21 May 2000
- Venue: De Kuip, Rotterdam
- Referee: Roelof Luinge
- Attendance: 40,000

The 2000 KNVB Cup final was a football match between NEC and Roda JC on 21 May 2000 at De Kuip, Rotterdam. It was the final match of the 1999–2000 KNVB Cup competition. Roda JC won 2–0 after goals from Bob Peeters and Eric van der Luer. It was their second KNVB Cup win.

== Route to the final ==
| NEC | | Round | Roda JC | |
|---|---|---|---|---|
| Opponent | Result | Group stage | Opponent | Result |
| Be Quick '28 | 5–2 (A) | Matchday 1 | Bye | |
| VVOG | 6–0 (A) | Matchday 2 | Bye | |
| HSC '21 | 1–0 (w.o.) (A) | Matchday 3 | Bye | |
| Group 5 winner: Team / Pld / W / D / L / GF / GA / GD / Pts; NEC / 3 / 3 / 0 / 0 / 12 / 2 / +10 / 9; Be Quick '28 / 3 / 2 / 0 / 1 / 7 / 7 / 0 / 6; VVOG / 3 / 1 / 0 / 2 / 4 / 9 / −5 / 3; HSC '21 / 3 / 0 / 0 / 3 / 1 / 6 / −5 / 0 | | Final standings | Bye | |
| Opponent | Result | Knockout stage | Opponent | Result |
| SV Spakenburg | 3–0 (H) | First round | Bye | |
| Heerenveen | 2–1 (A) | Second round | Bye | |
| Excelsior | 1–0 (H) | Round of 16 | Ajax | 1–0 (H) |
| Dordrecht'90 | 2–0 (H) | Quarter-finals | FC Utrecht | 1–0 (A) |
| AZ | 1–1 (4–1 p) (A) | Semi-finals | Vitesse | 1–0 (a.e.t.) (A) |

== Match ==
=== Details ===
21 May 2000
18:00 CEST

| NEC | 0–2 | Roda JC |
|---|---|---|
| | Report | Peeters 20'; Van der Luer 90' (pen.) |

De Kuip, Rotterdam
Attendance: 40,000
Referee: Roelof Luinge

| NEC | Roda JC |

| GK | 1 | (Netherlands) Bas Roorda | Booked |
| RB | 28 | (Belgium) Pieter Collen |
| CB | 6 | (Netherlands) Patrick Pothuizen (c) | Booked |
| CB | 5 | (Netherlands) Danny Hesp |
| LB | 12 | (Netherlands) Hennie de Romijn |
| CM | 10 | (Netherlands) Marchanno Schultz | | (substituted off) 77' |
| CM | 3 | (Netherlands) Marcel Koning |
| CM | 8 | (Netherlands) Anton Janssen |
| RW | 7 | (Netherlands) Bart Latuheru |
| CF | 15 | (Netherlands) Jack de Gier |
| LW | 11 | (Netherlands) Maikel Renfurm |
Substitutes:
| MF | | (Netherlands) Arno Arts | | (substituted on) 77' |
Manager:
(Netherlands) Ron de Groot

| GK | 1 | (Australia) Zeljko Kalac |
| RB | 2 | (Netherlands) Ger Senden |
| CB | 3 | (Netherlands) Regillio Vrede | Booked |
| CB | 22 | (Netherlands) Mark Luijpers |
| LB | 5 | (Netherlands) Ramon van Haaren |
| RM | 17 | (Cameroon) Bernard Tchoutang | | (substituted off) 86' |
| CM | 4 | (Belgium) Joos Valgaeren |
| CM | 8 | (Netherlands) Eric van der Luer (c) |
| LM | 11 | (Nigeria) Garba Lawal | | (substituted off) 78' |
| CF | 19 | (Belgium) Bob Peeters | | (substituted off) 70' |
| CF | 9 | (Belgium) Peter Van Houdt |
Substitutes:
| MF | 6 | (Belgium) Tom Soetaers | | (substituted on) 70' |
| MF | 14 | (Belgium) Kevin van Dessel | | (substituted on) 78' |
| MF | 7 | (Netherlands) Arno Doomernik | | (substituted on) 86' |
Manager:
(Netherlands) Sef Vergoossen

Match rules

- 90 minutes.
- 30 minutes of extra-time if necessary.
- Penalty shoot-out if scores still level.
- Maximum of three substitutions.
