= Guy Kiala =

Belgian football manager and former player

Personal information
- Date of birth: 16 April 1969 (age 57)
- Place of birth: Kalemie, Zaire
- Position: Defender

Youth career
- 1986–1987: Mechelen

Senior career*
Years	Team	Apps	(Gls)
1987–1995	Mechelen	152	(1)
1995–1997	K.F.C. Verbroedering Geel	47	(1)
1997–1998	Racing Jet Wavre	24	(0)
1998–2000	KAV Dendermonde	18	(1)
Total		241	(3)

International career
1987–2000	Belgium (military)		
- * Club domestic league appearances and goals

Guy Kiala (born 16 April 1969) is a Belgian football manager and former player who made 192 appearances in the Belgian First and Second Divisions playing for K.R.C. Mechelen and K.F.C. Verbroedering Geel.

== Football career ==
He started his youth career with K.R.C. Mechelen, before joining the seniors (then in first and second division). After 9 years playing in Mechelen, he earned a move to K.F.C. Verbroedering Geel (second division) where he played for 2 seasons. He finished his career with 1 season at Racing Jet Wavre and 2 seasons at KAV Dendermonde, before he continued his career in football as a coach.

== Managerial career ==
During his time at K.R.C. Mechelen, Kiala combined his football career as a coach for the club's youth teams. But his coaching career of senior teams started in 2000 when joining as an assistant coach at KSK Sint-Paulus Opwijk (fourth division). Where he also trained youth teams. And in 2008, assistant coach Kiala became head coach after trainer Vandevelde left the club. Despite a 7 to 9 in the final round he left the club to become head coach at Eendracht Opstal (fourth division).

From 2005 till 2010 he combined his civil training career with that of assistant coach of the Belgium National Military Football Team. And this with both men and women teams.

In 2010, he became 'Revalidation Coach and video Analyst' at SV Zulte Waregem (women). Later in 2012 he became the team's head coach which finished in fifth place in the BeNe League. And he obtained his UEFA Pro Licence in the same class as Bob Peeters.

Late 2013 he became assisten coach and performance analyst at the Freethiel at Waasland-Beveren.

Guy Kiala, had a chance to become coach of the England women's national football team. But went together with Bob Peeters in 2014 (with whom he has collaborated with Waasland-Beveren) to Charlton Athletic F.C. In January 2015, after the club sacked head coach Bob Peeters, Senior Professional Development Coach Patrick Van Houdt and Performance Analyst Kiala were also fired. At the time Charlton had won once in the previous 12 games and had slipped to 14th in the Championship table.

In August 2015, Kiala moved to the Kingdom of Saudi Arabia where he became Academy Technical Director at Al-Ahli Saudi FC

In August 2018, Kiala moved to the city of Al Ain, Abu Dhabi, United Arab Emirates where he became coach at Al Ain FC.

In 2019 Kiala met his former coach Michel Sablon, Technical Director of the UAE FA, and became head of the Coach Educators. Together with Sablon, they implemented a new way of educating UAE coaches. The project became a pilot for the AFC, the Asian Football Confederation.

Later Kiala worked as Technical Director and Head of youth development at Al Ain FC.

Kiala briefly worked for Regionals Sports Projects Management in Abu Dhabi before he was appointed Technical Director of the Uzbekistan Football Association.

During his time in Uzbekistan, Guy Kiala played a key role in the national football development. Under his influence, the Uzbekistan U23 national team qualified for the Olympic Games in Paris – the first time in the country’s history. Additionally, the Uzbekistan national team secured its first-ever qualification for the FIFA World Cup, marking a historic milestone for Uzbek football.During his tenure in Uzbekistan. Guy Kiala played a pivotal role in reshaping the country's football development strategy, with a particular focus on youth systems and long-term sustainability. Kiala’s influence extended beyond tactical success; he fostered a culture of excellence, collaboration, and innovation within Uzbekistan Football, leaving a lasting imprint on the country’s football ecosystem.

== Personal life ==
Kiala has a daughter named Keshia [Kishia] Kiala.
