= René Trost =

Dutch footballer and manager (born 1965)

Personal information
- Date of birth: 31 January 1965 (age 61)
- Place of birth: Kerkrade, Netherlands
- Position: Defender

Team information
- Current team: Chevremont (manager)

Senior career*
Years	Team	Apps	(Gls)
1983–1994	Roda JC	263	(22)
1994–1995	VVV-Venlo	12	(0)
1995–1998	Roda JC	48	(1)
Total		323	(23)

Managerial career
- 1998–2005: Roda JC (assistant)
- 2005: Patro Eisden
- 2005–2006: Lierse
- 2006–2007: Overpelt-Lommel
- 2007–2009: Roda JC (head of youth)
- 2009–2010: Roda JC (assistant)
- 2010–2013: MVV
- 2013–2014: VVV-Venlo
- 2014–2015: Roda JC
- 2016–2017: Roda JC (U-19 manager)
- 2017: Roda JC (assistant)
- 2017: Roda JC (interim manager)
- 2018: Lierse Kempenzonen
- 2020: Roda JC (interim manager)
- 2021–2023: Roda JC (U-18 manager)
- 2023–: Chevremont
- * Club domestic league appearances and goals

René Hubertus Johannes Trost (born 31 January 1965) is a Dutch professional football manager and former player who is the head coach of Eerste Klasse club Chevremont.

== Career ==
Trost played fifteen seasons at Roda JC; in between he spent half a season on loan at VVV-Venlo. He played 323 professional matches and scored 23 goals in them.

As a manager, Trost was assistant at Roda JC from 1998 to 2005. He then managed Patro Maasmechelen in Belgium, before replacing Paul Put at Lierse SK after Put was named in a bribery case. In 2006–07 he resigned after he won two points out of twelve matches at the start of the season. At the end of December he started at Belgian second division club United Overpelt-Lommel, only to resign two months later on 25 February after a series of bad results.

In July 2007, Trost returned to Roda, this time in a different role, as the head of the youth department. In February 2009, he was promoted to the first team squad as an assistant coach to manager Harm van Veldhoven.

On 20 July 2010 he signed a one-year contract with MVV, playing in the Dutch Eerste Divisie. He stayed three seasons with the team from Maastricht, but accepted the offer of VVV-Venlo in summer 2013. However, he was fired at the end of the season. On 1 June 2014, he signed with Roda JC Kerkrade to help the team return to the Eredivisie after its relegation. However, after a series of disappointing games, Trost and Roda JC decided to part ways on 7 April 2015.

In July 2016, Trost returned to Roda once again, this time as manager of their U19 squad. On 27 February 2017, he was added to the first team staff under Yannis Anastasiou. On 23 May 2017, Trost was appointed as interim manager of Roda JC together with Rick Plum, after the sacking of Yannis Anastasiou, with his task being to keep the club in the Eredivisie during the promotion/relegation play-offs. The duo managed to save Roda from relegation, but Trost left the club at the end of the season.

At the end of June 2018, Trost was once again appointed manager of Lierse. However, after only 14 games in 10 games, he left the position by mutual consent on 30 October 2018.

On 6 March 2020, Trost was once again back at Roda, as he was appointed interim manager for the rest of the season. But due to the COVID-19 outbreak in the Netherlands, he was only on the bench for one game, which he lost, and he then left at the end of the season.

In August 2020, Trost became a member of Roda's supervisory board. He left the board in June 2021, as he was appointed manager of Roda's U-18 squad. In January 2023 it was confirmed, that Trost would take charge of VV Chevremont from the upcoming 2023–24 season.
