= Vrede (disambiguation) =

Vrede is a town in South Africa.

Vrede may also refer to:

- "Vrede" (song), a song by Ruth Jacott

== People with the surname ==
- Ginty Vrede (1985–2008), Dutch kickboxer
- Mitchell te Vrede (born 1991), Dutch footballer
- Regillio Vrede (born 1973), Dutch footballer
