= Gerald Sibon =

Dutch footballer

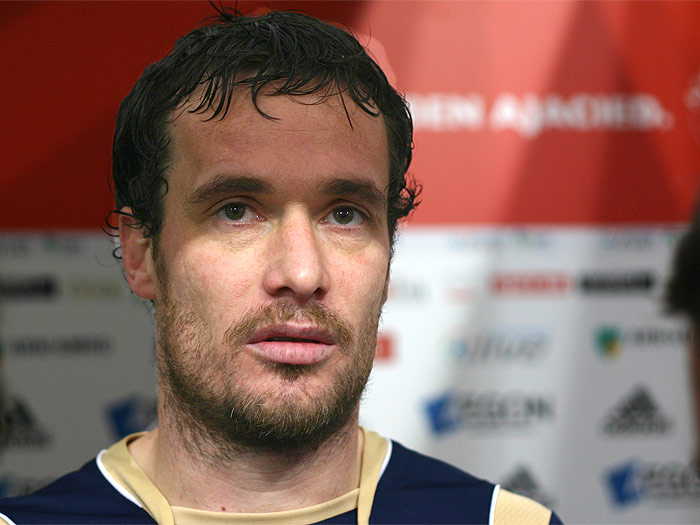

Personal information
- Date of birth: 19 April 1974 (age 52)
- Place of birth: Emmen, Netherlands
- Height: 1.98 m (6 ft 6 in)
- Position: Forward

Team information
- Current team: Adelaide United (performance coach)

Senior career*
Years	Team	Apps	(Gls)
1993–1994	Twente	3	(0)
1994–1996	VVV-Venlo	53	(34)
1996–1997	Roda JC	34	(13)
1997–1999	Ajax	24	(4)
1999–2003	Sheffield Wednesday	129	(36)
2003–2004	Heerenveen	38	(19)
2004–2006	PSV	21	(7)
2006–2007	1. FC Nürnberg	10	(0)
2007–2010	Heerenveen	84	(24)
2010–2011	Melbourne Heart	27	(7)
2011–2012	Heerenveen	14	(2)
Total		437	(149)

International career
2008	Netherlands Olympic (O.P.)	4	(2)

Managerial career
- 2019–: Adelaide United (performance coach)
- * Club domestic league appearances and goals

Gerald Sibon (born 19 April 1974) is a former Dutch footballer who played as a forward. He is the current performance coach for A-League club Adelaide United.

== Club career ==
=== Europe ===
He featured for Twente in the 1993–94 season as a substitute but could only string together three games before deciding to sign for VVV-Venlo of the Eerste Divisie in the following season. After two successful seasons playing for VVV where he scored 34 goals, he joined Roda JC in 1996 and impressed with 13 goals back in the top-flight, and also scored as Roda JC won the 1997 KNVB Cup Final.

Sibon moved to Ajax in 1997 but was frustrated and hampered by a lack of first team action, having been relegated to the bench by the likes of Wamberto, Shota Arveladze, Georgi Kinkladze and crowd favourite Brian Laudrup. An offer by English Premiership club Sheffield Wednesday prompted Sibon to transfer to the Yorkshire club in 1999 for the price of £2 million. Joining him at Sheffield Wednesday were Dutch international Wim Jonk and the Belgian Gilles De Bilde.

After spending four seasons with Sheffield Wednesday, where he scored 43 goals overall for the club and was the club's highest goal scorer for three consecutive seasons, also winning two consecutive player of the year awards, he decided to return to the Eredivisie and joined Heerenveen in January 2003. He featured for Heerenveen in 38 matches and scored 19 goals in two seasons, before signing for PSV in 2004. He won the Dutch Eredivise title in 2004–05, contending with Jan Vennegoor of Hesselink and Robert for a first team spot. In July 2006, he joined Bundesliga side Nürnberg on a free transfer. He left the club one year later, signing a two-year contract with his old team Heerenveen.

=== Australia ===
Sibon left the Netherlands in May 2010, when he signed with Australian A-League club Melbourne Heart for their inaugural season, coached by fellow Dutchman John van 't Schip. He quickly cemented his position in the starting line-up, playing mainly in a playmaker role, but still managing to show his skills as a striker by scoring seven goals, Melbourne Heart's second top-scorer for the season. He became a fan favourite for his often-dangerous free-kicks, including a goal from a stunning 20-metre curling free kick, during the second ever Melbourne Derby.

In the week before the Heart's final game of the season, Sibon announced he would not be continuing his career with the club. He was told he would not be offered a contract renewal, likely to his disappointment, after having stated earlier in the month that he wanted to spend another year in Melbourne.

=== Back to Europe ===
On 27 June 2011, it was announced Sibon had signed with his former team Heerenveen thus beginning his third stint at the club. The final match of his career was the May 2012 defeat by Feyenoord, which sealed Europa League football for Heerenveen.

== International career ==
In the summer of 2008, Sibon was named in the Netherlands squad for the Beijing Olympics. He scored a 93rd-minute equaliser in the 2–2 draw against the United States and the winning penalty in the 73rd minute against Japan. This placed him amongst 18 players who scored two goals or more in the tournament.

== Honours ==
Roda JC

- KNVB Cup: 1996–97

Ajax

- Eredivisie: 1997–98
- KNVB Cup: 1997–98, 1998–99

PSV Eindhoven

- Eredivisie: 2004–05, 2005–06
- KNVB Cup: 2004–05

1. FC Nürnberg

- DFB-Pokal: 2006–07

Heerenveen

- KNVB Cup: 2008–09
