= Hans Spillmann =

Dutch footballer (born 1969)

Personal information
- Full name: Johannes Spillmann
- Date of birth: 2 June 1969 (age 57)
- Place of birth: Heerlen, Netherlands
- Height: 1.83 m (6 ft 0 in)
- Position: Goalkeeper

Team information
- Current team: Alemannia Aachen II (Goalkeeper Coach)
- Number: 12

Senior career*
Years	Team	Apps	(Gls)
	MVV Maastricht	?	(0)
	VV Hasselt	?	(0)
?–1996	Verbroedering Geel	?	(0)
1996–1997	Roda JC	0	(0)
1997–2002	MVV Maastricht	53	(0)
2004–2005	VV Eijsden		
2005–2008	FC Geleen-Zuid		
2008–2009	Alemannia Aachen II		

Managerial career
- 2008–present: Alemannia Aachen II (Goalkeeper Coach)
- * Club domestic league appearances and goals as of 17:16, 4 October 2008 (UTC)

Johannes Spillmann (born 2 February 1969, in Heerlen) is a retired Dutch professional footballer who last played as a goalkeeper for NRW-Liga team Alemannia Aachen II.

== Career ==
Spillmann signed 31 January 2008 with Alemannia Aachen, he comes from FC Geleen-Zuid.

== Coaching career ==
On 1 February 2008 was named as the Goalkeeper Coach of Alemannia Aachen youth and will in July 2009 begin to coaching the goalkeepers by Roda JC. For the 2017/2018 season he is working as a goalkeeping coach at MVV Maastricht. Since 2019 he is Goalkeeper Coach of Alemannia Aachen. Next to that, as hobby, he coaches the amateurs of Rood-Groen LVC'01

== Honours ==
Roda JC

- KNVB Cup: 1996–97
