= Bob Peeters =

Belgian football executive, manager and former player (born 1974)

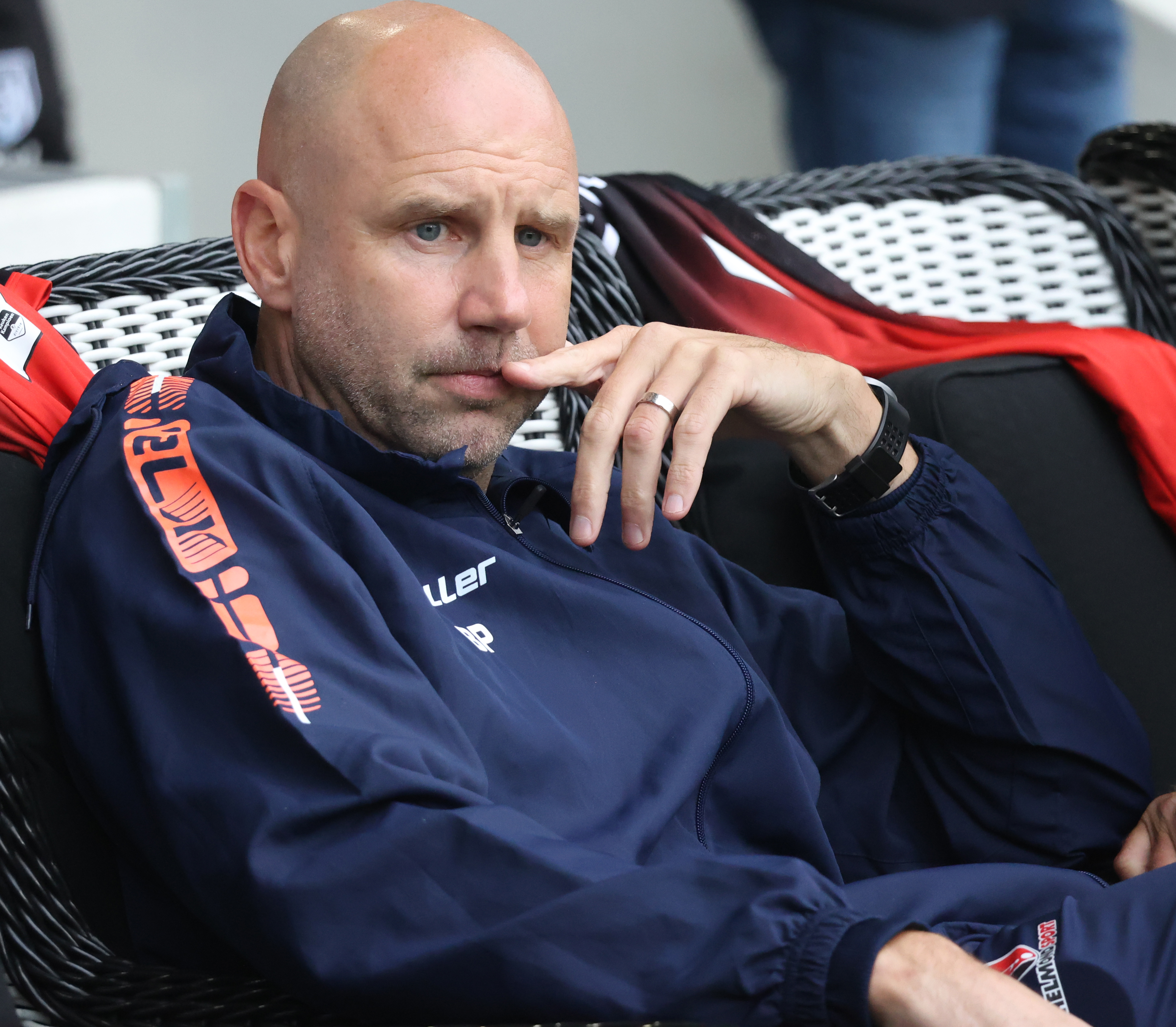
- Peeters in 2023

Personal information
- Date of birth: 10 January 1974 (age 52)
- Place of birth: Lier, Belgium
- Height: 1.96 m (6 ft 5 in)
- Position: Striker

Team information
- Current team: Beveren (sporting director)

Youth career
- 1980–1982: Ternesse VV Wommelgem
- 1982–1992: Lierse

Senior career*
Years	Team	Apps	(Gls)
1992–1997	Lierse	119	(24)
1997–2000	Roda JC	93	(39)
2000–2003	Vitesse	77	(17)
2003–2005	Millwall	25	(3)
2005–2006	Genk	21	(9)
2006–2008	Lierse	25	(5)
Total		360	(97)

International career
1998–2002	Belgium	13	(4)

Managerial career
- 2009–2010: Gent (youth)
- 2010–2012: Cercle Brugge
- 2012–2013: Gent
- 2013–2014: Waasland-Beveren
- 2014–2015: Charlton Athletic
- 2015: Lokeren
- 2015–2016: Westerlo
- 2017–2021: Westerlo
- 2021–2022: TOP Oss
- 2022–2024: Helmond Sport
- 2024–: Beveren (sporting director)
- * Club domestic league appearances and goals

Bob Peeters (born 10 January 1974) is a Belgian football executive and former player and manager. He currently serves as sporting director of Challenger Pro League club Beveren.

== Club career ==
=== Lierse ===
Noted for his large stature, measuring 1.96 m, Peeters grew up in Wommelgem, Antwerp Province and joined Ternesse VV Wommelgem at a young age. He moved to the Lierse academy at the age of eight, progressing through the youth teams before making his senior debut in 1992 under head coach Herman Helleputte.

In 1994, after the arrival of Eric Gerets as manager, Peeters experienced his breakthrough. The striker scored eight goals and formed a striking duo with Dirk Huysmans, in a Lierse-team counting profiles such as Nico Van Kerckhoven, Philip Haagdoren, Eric Van Meir and David Brocken which won the Belgian First Division A title in the 1996–97 season. In January 1997, Peeters was in contract negotiations with the Lierse board, but chose to leave, according to him because he was seen as a "tall, clumsy" striker.

=== Roda JC ===
After winning the league title with Lierse, Peeters signed with Dutch Eredivisie club Roda JC under the Bosman ruling. There, he was united with fellow countrymen Joos Valgaeren, Gregory Delwarte and Peter Van Houdt. In his first season, the club from Kerkrade finished fourteenth, but after the arrival of manager Sef Vergoossen, Roda returned to mid-table. In 2000, Peeters also reached the KNVB Cup final with the club. In De Kuip in Rotterdam, Roda beat NEC 2–0 to claim their second ever cup win. Peeters opened the score after 18 minutes after heading in a free kick from Eric van der Luer. During the celebrations after the game, Peeters damaged the trophy which caused a dent still visible to this day.

=== Vitesse ===
In August 2000, Peeters signed with Vitesse for a fee of BEF 252 million – around €6.25 million – which made him the second most expensive Belgian transfer ever, only surpassed by Émile Mpenza. Earlier, Roda had rejected an offer from Ipswich Town.

Under manager Ronald Koeman, Peeters impressed. Seen in Belgium as a technically limited footballer, was known in the Netherlands as an intelligent player with overview and strength. With Vitesse, he finished above mid-table two consecutive seasons. In the 2002–03 season, Peeters and his teammates dropped far in the rankings. The club was in financial turmoil and many high-earning were allowed to leave.

=== Millwall ===
Peeters signed a three-year contract with English Football League First Division club Millwall on 20 August 2003, where he was set to replace regular target-man Mark McCammon. He struggled with injuries during his spell in England.

=== Genk ===
In 2005, Peeters was poised for a return to Belgium, and after negotiating with Westerlo, he eventually signed with Genk after being convinced by technical director Ariël Jacobs. Peeters had to compete with fellow strikers Kevin Vandenbergh, Paul Kpaka and Nenad Stojanović. He scored nine goals for Genk, who finished the season in fifth place.

=== Return to Lierse ===
Peeters was set for a return to childhood club Lierse after one season with Genk. Initially, Genk chairman Jos Vaessen was willing to let him leave on a free transfer, but this offer was withdrawn afterwards. In the end, 32-year-old Peeters was involved in a trade with Oleksandr Yakovenko, who was then playing for Lierse.

Peeters did make many appearances for Lierse. The club finished second to last in the 2006–07 league table and suffered relegation to the Belgian Second Division via the play-offs. In October 2008, he announced his retirement from professional football after suffering an achilles tendon injury.

== International career ==
Peeters made his debut for the Belgium national team on 25 February 1998 in a friendly against the United States, which was won 2–0 thanks to a brace by Nico Van Kerckhoven. Peeters came on as a substitute for Luc Nilis after 84 minutes.

He participated in the 2002 FIFA World Cup qualification but did not make the final squad for 2002 FIFA World Cup main tournament. On 28 February 2001, he scored a hat-trick against San Marino at the King Baudouin Stadium.

== Managerial career ==
He became manager of Gent one week after being released by Cercle Brugge in October 2012 but was fired in January 2013.

Peeters was appointed as manager of English side, Charlton Athletic, in May 2014 on a 12-month contract. In January 2015 after only 25 games in charge he was dismissed. His Senior Professional Development Coach Patrick Van Houdt and Performance Analyst Guy Kiala were also fired. At the time Charlton had won once in the previous 12 games and had slipped to 14th in the Championship table.

In 2015, Bob Peeters got a new chance at Lokeren, replacing Peter Maes who left to Genk. After 12 league games, with only 3 victories, he got sacked by the owner of the club, in spite of just winning away at Westerlo.

=== Westerlo ===
On 16 November 2015, Peeters was appointed head coach of Westerlo. He succeeded Harm van Veldhoven who was fired the day before. Peeters' main goal in the 2015–16 season was avoiding relegation, something that he succeeded in on 13 March 2016 by winning 1–0 against Waasland Beveren. OH Leuven had lost their home game against Club Brugge on the same day, making them the relegated club of that season. On 13 September 2016, Peeters was dismissed as head coach of Westerlo.

=== Return to Westerlo ===
In December 2017, Peeters returned as head coach of Westerlo, who had meanwhile been relegated to the First Division B. His first match in charge was a 1–0 win over OH Leuven on 9 December 2017. Westerlo's last victory dated from 30 September that year, after which the club only gained three points out of 30 under Vedran Pelić, who later stayed on as assistant to Peeters, together with Eric Reenaers. Westerlo finished penultimate in the regular season that season. In the play-offs, however, they remained undefeated, after which Westerlo moved up to sixth place.

In November 2018, Peeters was linked to a return to Waasland-Beveren, but in the end he stayed with Westerlo after the club offered him a contract extension until 2023. In the 2018–19 season, Westerlo finished fifth out of eight clubs in both the first and second period, but in the final ranking the club finished fourth, which meant that it qualified for play-offs.

In the 2019–20 season, Westerlo competed for the first period championship, but in the end they finished three points below OH Leuven. The second period championship was also a tight affair – with three match days to go, Westerlo were in the lead together with OH Leuven, Beerschot and Virton –, but with two matchdays to go, Westerlo had their fate in their own hands: with six out of six points they had enough for a final spot in the play-offs. However, on the final matchday, Westerlo lost 3–1 to Union SG, so that Beerschot, not Westerlo, had the opportunity to promoted. Westerlo therefore no longer had a chance to promote, despite the fact that they had achieved the most points in the final ranking.

Westerlo also made a run at promotion in the 2020–21 season, especially considering that the period championships were abolished that season and therefore only the champion and possible vice-champion of the regular season were promoted. Westerlo competed for second place for a while that season, but eventually were surpassed by Seraing. After a draw against Club NXT on the final matchday, Westerlo ended in fourth place, nine points behind Seraing. On 10 May 2021, it was announced that Peeters and Westerlo parted ways by mutual consent. Peeters later indicated that both parties were keen on moving on, and that he was not interested in returning to another season in the First Division B, where clubs compete against each other four times per season.

=== TOP Oss ===
On 8 June 2021, Eerste Divisie club TOP Oss appointed Peeters as their new head coach. He succeeded Klaas Wels, signing a one-year contract. Peeters started the season with a 1–0 away win over Excelsior.

On 20 May 2022, the club announced that Peeters had been dismissed from his position as head coach, citing "insufficient synergy" between Peeters and newly appointed technical director Klaas Wels.

=== Helmond Sport ===
Peeters was appointed new head coach of Helmond Sport in December 2022, becoming part of a new staff alongside new technical director Jurgen Streppel and head of scouting Dirk Jan Derksen. He was dismissed as head coach on 8 April 2024 after a string of disappointing results.

== Executive career ==
On 12 June 2024, Peeters was appointed the new sporting director of Challenger Pro League club Beveren.

== Media career ==
During the 2000 UEFA European Football Championship, during which he was injured, he worked as a journalist who interviewed people for VRT. Presenter Mark Uytterhoeven regularly sent him on the road for the program. Peeters' search for a Romanian in particular became a well-known segment. In addition, for a while he was an analyst during UEFA Champions League matches and as color commentator for Belgacom TV.

In 2001 Peeters was a guest in the talk show Men on the Edge of a Nervous Breakdown. In 2009, he became the presenter of the Belgian version of Wipeout alongside Walter Grootaers. When he became the youth coach of Gent, he stopped presenting.

== Career statistics ==
=== International ===
International goals scored by Bob Peeters
Goal	Date	Venue	Opponent	Score	Result	Competition
1	7 October 2000	Skonto Stadium, Riga	Latvia	0 – 4	Won	2002 World Cup Qualification
2	28 February 2001	Stade Roi Baudouin, Brussels	San Marino	10 – 1	Won	2002 World Cup Qualification
3	28 February 2001	Stade Roi Baudouin, Brussels	San Marino	10 – 1	Won	2002 World Cup Qualification
4	28 February 2001	Stade Roi Baudouin, Brussels	San Marino	10 – 1	Won	2002 World Cup Qualification

== Managerial statistics ==
As of match played 5 April 2024

Managerial record by team and tenure
Team	From	To	Record				
Team	From	To	P	W	D	L	Win %
Cercle Brugge	1 July 2010	27 October 2012	103	39	23	41	37.9
Gent	1 November 2012	3 January 2013	11	1	4	6	9.1
Waasland-Beveren	5 November 2013	23 May 2014	23	6	8	9	26.1
Charlton Athletic	27 May 2014	11 January 2015	28	7	13	8	25.0
Lokeren	3 June 2015	25 October 2015	13	4	2	7	30.77
Westerlo	26 November 2015	13 September 2016	22	6	4	12	27.3
Westerlo	5 December 2017	30 June 2021	114	46	33	35	40.4
TOP Oss	1 July 2021	30 June 2022	38	11	8	19	28.9
Helmond Sport	23 December 2022	8 April 2024	54	16	18	20	29.6
Total			406	136	113	157	33.5

== Honours ==
=== Player ===
Lierse

- Belgian First Division: 1996–97

Roda JC

- KNVB Cup: 1999–2000
