= Koen Jansen =

Koen Jansen may refer to:

- Diggy Dex, Dutch rapper
- Koen Jansen (footballer), Dutch footballer
