= Henri Heeren =

Dutch association football player

Personal information
- Date of birth: 25 October 1974 (age 52)
- Place of birth: Heerlen, Netherlands
- Height: 1.76 m (5 ft 9 in)
- Positions: Defender; midfielder

Youth career
- 1980-: Olympia Schinveld
- RKBSV

Senior career*
Years	Team	Apps	(Gls)
1995–1997	Roda JC	16	(0)
1997–2003	Alemannia Aachen	166	(18)
200–2003	→ Alemannia Aachen II	3	(0)
2003–2005	1. FC Saarbrücken	44	(3)
2005–2009	Fortuna Düsseldorf	68	(5)
2008–2009	→ Fortuna Düsseldorf II	9	(4)
Total		306	(30)
- * Club domestic league appearances and goals

Henri Heeren (born 25 October 1974) is a Dutch former football player.

== Career ==
Raised in Schinveld, Heeren started playing for local side Olympia Schinveld and then joined BSV Limburgia. After a spell at Eredivisie club Roda JC, Heeren moved to Germany and had a lengthy career with Alemannia Aachen, 1. FC Saarbrücken and Fortuna Düsseldorf.

== Honours ==
Roda JC

- KNVB Cup: 1996–97
