= Ger Senden =

Dutch footballer (born 1971)

Personal information
- Full name: Gerardus Christianus Senden
- Date of birth: 9 July 1971 (age 55)
- Place of birth: Heerlen, Netherlands
- Height: 1.84 m (6 ft 0 in)
- Position: Right-back

Youth career
- VV Chevremont
- Roda JC

Senior career*
Years	Team	Apps	(Gls)
1989–2008	Roda JC	411	(9)

Managerial career
- 2019: Germania Teveren
- 2020–2022: LHC
- * Club domestic league appearances and goals

Gerardus Christianus (Ger) Senden (born 9 July 1971) is a Dutch former professional footballer who played his entire career for Roda JC.

== Playing career ==
Senden held the record for the longest-running tenure at Roda JC since the club's inception, playing first-team football for the club between 1989 and 2008. Born in Heerlen, he began playing football in the youth ranks of VV Chevremont before moving to Roda JC. His unwavering commitment earned him the nickname Mister Roda JC and endeared him to fans of the South Limburg club.

He made his professional debut for the club on 12 August 1989 in a 1–1 league draw against Twente, replacing Alfons Groenendijk in the 90th minute.

During the mid-1990s, Senden was part of one of Roda JC's most successful teams. In 1995, under the guidance of head coach Huub Stevens, the team achieved an impressive second-place finish in the Eredivisie. Alongside standout players like Raymond Atteveld, Barry van Galen, Tijjani Babangida, Johan de Kock, and Tomek Iwan, they posed a significant challenge to Ajax, the eventual title winners.

Before the 2007–08 season, Senden's tenure at Roda JC surpassed that of all but two other players combined: Gène Hanssen and Eric van der Luer. Upon announcing his retirement on 26 March 2008, Senden was honoured during his final home match against VVV-Venlo. In the 89th minute, he was substituted and received a spontaneous farewell from the crowd, followed by a celebratory lap carried on the shoulders of teammate Pa-Modou Kah. As Roda reached the playoffs, he would make one last competitive appearance against NEC: after coming on as a substitute for Kah, he was sent off in the 55th minute. A testimonial match featuring former teammates concluded his career.

With Roda JC, Senden won the KNVB Cup twice: in 1997 and 2000, scoring in the 1997 KNVB Cup final.

== Coaching career ==
Even during his active playing days, Senden assumed the role of team manager at Roda JC from October 2007. However, organisational changes led to his departure in 2018, followed by legal proceedings resulting in his official exit from the club in March 2019.

He briefly served as head coach of German amateur club Germania Teveren in the 2019–20 season before resigning in September 2019. Between 2020 and 2022 he managed Tweede Klasse club LHC from Eygelshoven, before being forced to resign due to ongoing bacterial infections.

== Honours ==
Roda JC

- KNVB Cup: 1996–97, 1999–2000

== See also ==
- List of one-club men
