= Tieme Klompe =

Dutch footballer

Personal information
- Date of birth: 8 April 1976 (age 50)
- Place of birth: Roden, Netherlands
- Height: 1.81 m (5 ft 11 in)
- Position: Defender

Senior career*
Years	Team	Apps	(Gls)
1996–2004	Heerenveen	145	(0)
2004–2005	RKC Waalwijk	2	(0)
2005	Groningen	1	(0)
Total		148	(0)

International career
1998	Netherlands U21	2	(0)

Managerial career
- 2012–2017: Heerenveen (assistant)
- 2014–2015: Heerenveen II
- 2015–2018: Netherlands U20 (assistant)
- 2018–2019: Harkemase Boys
- * Club domestic league appearances and goals

Tieme Klompe (born 8 April 1976) is a Dutch former professional footballer who played as a defender for Eredivisie clubs Heerenveen, RKC Waalwijk and Groningen.

== Club career ==
Klompe started his career at Heerenveen, where he was a first-team player for eight seasons. During his time at Heerenveen, the club reached the final of the KNVB Cup (1996–97) and finished as runners-up in the Eredivisie (1999–2000), the latter resulting in qualification for the Champions League group stage (2000–01).

In the summer of 2004, Klompe moved to RKC Waalwijk, where he was released a year later, having made two appearances. He then signed an amateur contract with Groningen. After making one appearance, he announced his retirement on 24 October 2005. He cited the many injuries he struggled with during his career as the reason for his decision.

== International career ==
In 1998, Klompe was selected for the Netherlands national under-21 team, making his first appearance on 18 February against Portugal. He was subsequently part of the Netherlands squad at the final stages of the 1998 UEFA European Under-21 Championship in Romania, appearing in one match as the team finished in fourth place.

== Coaching career ==
After some years as a youth coach for Heerenveen, the club announced on 22 November 2012, that he had been promoted to the first team as assistant manager of Marco van Basten. In the 2014–15 season, he was also the manager of their reserve team/U21's. At the end of August 2016, he was hired as assistant manager for Netherlands' U20 national team alongside his role at Heerenveen. He left the club at the end of the 2016–17 season.

Tieme was appointed manager of Harkemase Boys for the 2018–19 season. However, he resigned on 29 April 2019.
