= Maarten Schops =

Belgian footballer (born 1976)

Personal information
- Date of birth: 3 April 1976 (age 50)
- Place of birth: Leuven, Belgium
- Height: 1.80 m (5 ft 11 in)
- Position: Defensive midfielder

Senior career*
Years	Team	Apps	(Gls)
1993–1996	Lommel	34	(0)
1996–1998	Roda JC	35	(2)
1998	→ RKC Waalwijk (loan)	9	(3)
1998–2001	RKC Waalwijk	56	(5)
2000–2001	→ RBC Roosendaal (loan)	22	(0)
2002–2003	FC Zwolle	19	(1)
2003–2004	FC Den Bosch	18	(0)
2004–2005	Verbroedering Geel		
2005–2009	BV Cloppenburg	92	(10)
2009–2013	Schwarz-Weiß Rehden	28	(1)
- * Club domestic league appearances and goals

Maarten Schops (born 3 April 1976) is a Belgian former footballer, who played as a defensive midfielder.

== Club career ==
Schops started out with Belgian club Lommel. In 1996, he joined Dutch side Roda JC, where he won the KNVB Cup in his first season, scoring in the final. During the second half of the 1997–98 season, he was loaned out to fellow Eredivisie team RKC Waalwijk, and in the summer of 1998, he made a permanent transfer to the club. In October 2000, Schops was loaned out to RBC Roosendaal for the remainder of the season, as his services were no longer needed at RKC Waalwijk. He subsequently had short periods playing for FC Zwolle (Eredivisie) and FC Den Bosch (Eerste Divisie) before leaving the Netherlands for Verbroedering Geel in his home country. In 2005, he moved to Germany, where he played in the lower leagues.

== Honours ==
Roda JC

- KNVB Cup: 1996–97

Den Bosch

- Eerste Divisie: 2003–04
