= Garba Lawal =

Nigerian footballer (born in 1974)

Personal information
- Date of birth: 22 May 1974 (age 52)
- Place of birth: Kaduna, Nigeria
- Height: 1.83 m (6 ft 0 in)
- Position: Winger

Team information
- Current team: Kaduna United (general manager)

Senior career*
Years	Team	Apps	(Gls)
1993–1995	Julius Berger		
1995–1996	Espérance ST		
1997–2002	Roda	155	(20)
2002–2003	Levski Sofia	15	(3)
2004	Elfsborg	12	(0)
2004–2005	Santa Clara	16	(0)
2005–2006	Iraklis	33	(1)
2007	Changsha Ginde	3	(0)
2007	Julius Berger		
2009–2012	Lobi Stars		

International career
1996	Nigeria U23	6	(0)
2000	Nigeria Olympic (O.P.)	4	(1)
1997–2006	Nigeria	57	(6)

Managerial career
- 2009–2013: Lobi Stars (assistant)
- 2009: Nigeria U17 (team coordinator)
Medal record
Olympic medal record
Representing Nigeria
Men's Football
Gold medal – first place	1996 Atlanta	Team competition
- * Club domestic league appearances and goals

Garba Lawal (born 22 May 1974) is a Nigerian former professional footballer who played as a winger. From 2014 to 2015, he was general manager at Kaduna United. He is with the technical department of the Nigeria Football Federation.

== Club career ==
As a player, Lawal had his most successful time at Roda JC in the Eredivisie, in the Netherlands. He also played for Julius Berger F.C. in Nigeria and Chinese side Changsha Ginde.

In August 2009, he announced his return as a player-coach for Makurdi side Lobi Stars, He was named general manager of Kaduna United in February 2014.

== International career ==
Lawal is regarded as one of the most versatile players in the Nigeria national team of the 1990s and early 2000s often being used for any position ranging from defence to attack on the left wing. Lawal took part at the FIFA World Cups in 1998, where he played a key role in the 3–2 win over Spain in Nigeria's first match of the tournament, and in 2002. He won the Olympic gold medal in 1996. He represented Nigeria at four editions of African Cup of Nations: 2000, 2002, 2004 and 2006, scoring in all but the first.

== Post-playing career ==
In August 2009, Lawal was named as the assistant coach of Lobi Stars F.C. In the same year, he was employed as team coordinator for the Nigeria U17 national team.

In February 2014 he was appointed general manager at Kaduna United.

== Career statistics ==
Scores and results list Nigeria's goal tally first, score column indicates score after each Lawal goal.

List of international goals scored by Garba Lawal
No.	Date	Venue	Opponent	Score	Result	Competition	Ref.
1	13 June 1998	Stade de la Beaujoire, Nantes, France	Spain	2–2	3–2	1998 FIFA World Cup	
2	23 January 1999	Moshood Abiola National Stadium, Abuja, Nigeria	Burundi	1–0	2–0	2000 African Cup of Nations qualification	
3	22 April 2000	National Stadium, Lagos, Nigeria	Eritrea	2–0	4–0	2002 FIFA World Cup qualification	
4	3 February 2002	Stade du 26 Mars, Bamako, Mali	Ghana	1–0	1–0	2002 African Cup of Nations	
5	4 February 2004	Taieb Mhiri Stadium, Sfax, Tunisia	Benin	1–0	2–1	2004 African Cup of Nations	
6	9 February 2006	Cairo Military Academy Stadium, Cairo, Egypt	Senegal	1–0	1–0	2006 African Cup of Nations	

== Honours ==
Roda JC

- KNVB Cup: 1996–97, 1999–2000

Levski Sofia

- Bulgarian Cup: 2002–03
