= Martin Jol =

Dutch football manager (born 1956)

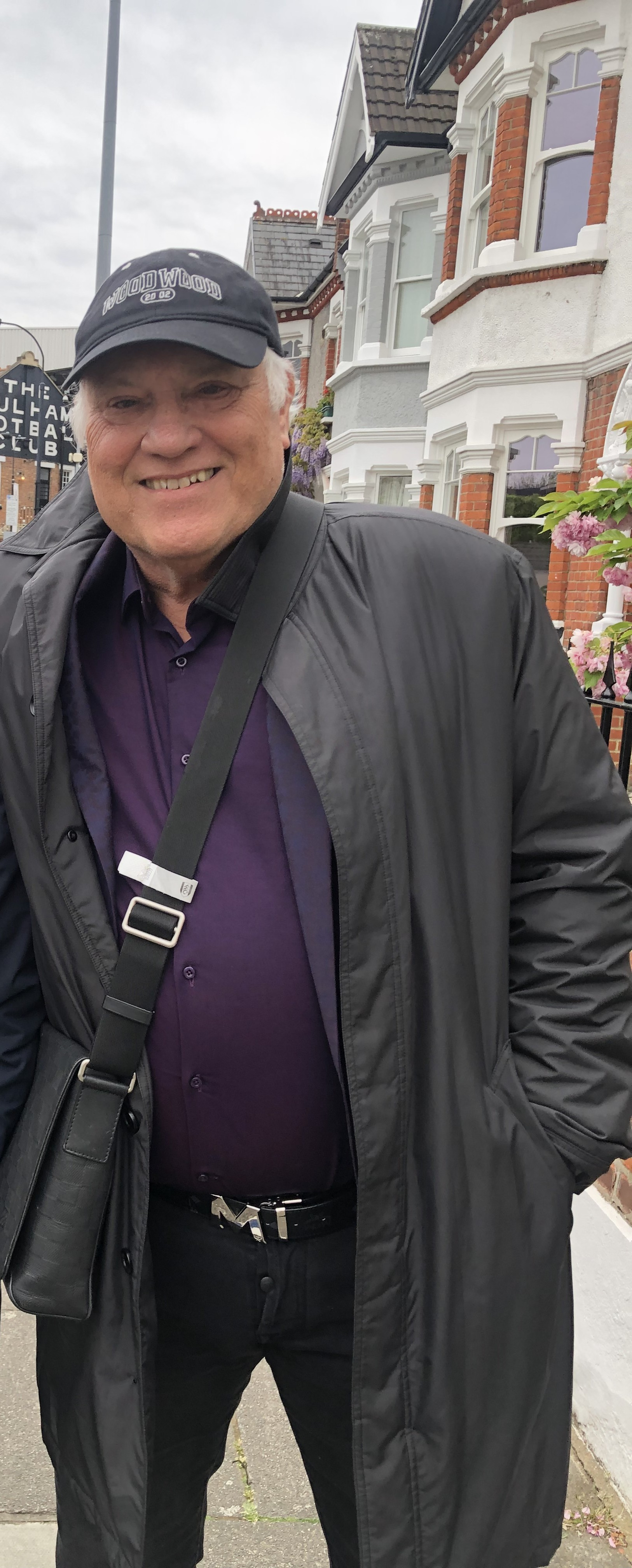
- Jol in 2025

Personal information
- Full name: Maarten Cornelis Jol
- Date of birth: 16 January 1956 (age 70)
- Place of birth: The Hague, Netherlands
- Height: 1.88 m (6 ft 2 in)
- Position: Midfielder

Youth career
- JAC ADO Den Haag

Senior career*
| Years | Team | Apps | (Gls) |
| 1973–1978 | ADO Den Haag | 132 | (9) |
| 1978–1979 | Bayern Munich | 9 | (0) |
| 1979–1981 | Twente | 71 | (9) |
| 1981–1984 | West Bromwich Albion | 63 | (4) |
| 1984–1985 | Coventry City | 15 | (0) |
| 1985–1989 | ADO Den Haag | 135 | (6) |
| Total | | 425 | (28) |

International career
| 1980–1981 | Netherlands | 3 | (0) |

Managerial career
- 1991–1995: ADO Den Haag (amateurs)
- 1995–1996: Scheveningen
- 1996–1998: Roda JC
- 1998–2004: RKC Waalwijk
- 2004–2007: Tottenham Hotspur
- 2008–2009: Hamburger SV
- 2009–2010: Ajax
- 2011–2013: Fulham
- 2016: Al-Ahly
- * Club domestic league appearances and goals

Maarten Cornelis "Martin" Jol (born 16 January 1956) is a Dutch football manager and former midfielder. He played over 400 games during his career which included spells in the Netherlands, Germany and England, as well as earning three caps with the Netherlands national team. He subsequently became a manager and has worked for Roda JC, RKC Waalwijk and Ajax in his homeland, as well as German Bundesliga club Hamburger SV and English Premier League clubs Tottenham Hotspur and Fulham and Egypt's Al Ahly.

== Playing career ==
Jol was born in The Hague. He started his playing career with an amateur team before joining the local professional side ADO Den Haag. He turned professional with Den Haag in 1973. He won the 1975 Dutch Cup with the team defeating Twente. He played in the Bundesliga for the 1978–79 season with Bayern Munich before returning to the Dutch Eredivisie to play for Twente in 1979. While with Twente, he won his first cap for the Netherlands national football team in October 1980.

Jol moved to England in 1981, joining West Bromwich Albion. He appeared in the semi-finals of both domestic cup competitions in 1981–82. He signed for Coventry City in 1984 but wanted to leave the club after manager Bobby Gould was asked to leave. Jol returned to Den Haag in 1985, and won the 1985 Dutch Footballer of the Year award in the Eerste Divisie league.

At international level, Jol won ten schoolboy caps, 20 'B' caps, 12 Under-21 caps and 12 Under-23 caps. He also made three appearances for the senior team, and competed at the 1980 Mundialito held in Uruguay.

== Coaching career ==
=== Early career in the Netherlands ===
Jol's coaching career began in 1991 when he took over at the amateur side ADO Den Haag and took them to the highest local amateur division. Jol then moved to the leading local amateur side Scheveningen for one season, where he won the national non-league championship. Jol then spent two years as manager at the professional Eredivisie side Roda JC from the town of Kerkrade, during which time he won the Dutch Cup in 1997, Roda's first trophy for 30 years. Between 1998 and 2004, Jol managed the Dutch professional team RKC Waalwijk. He started there in November with only three points at the bottom of the table. He saved them from relegation in their first year and was in contention for European football in the years after. He was honoured with the Dutch Football Writers Coach of the Year 2001 and with the Dutch Players and Coaches Coach of the Year 2002 awards.

=== Tottenham Hotspur ===
RKC Waalwijk denied reports in June 2004 that Jol was about to become assistant manager of Tottenham Hotspur. Several days later, however, Jol was given the job under Tottenham's new coach, Jacques Santini, having been recruited by Tottenham's sporting director Frank Arnesen. Santini resigned from the manager's job after just 13 games, and on 8 November 2004, Jol was confirmed as his replacement. In his first season in charge, Jol improved their league fortunes and scrapped the defensive nature of play that Santini had instilled. After winning five league games in a row, Tottenham's best run of form since the 1992–1993 season, he won the FA Manager of the Month award in December 2004 and was strongly linked in the press with the then vacant managerial job at Ajax of Amsterdam. Jol, however, ruled out moving clubs early. Jol led Tottenham to the verge of European qualification but the season ended with a ninth-place finish in the Premier League after a final day draw at home to Blackburn Rovers. This meant Spurs missed out on the UEFA Cup spot by two points. In August 2005, he signed a new three-year contract with Tottenham.

Tottenham warmed up for the 2005–06 season by winning the pre-season tournament the Peace Cup, which featured such clubs as PSV, Lyon, Boca Juniors; Tottenham defeated Lyon in the final. Although Tottenham went out of both cup competitions at the first hurdle, they never once dropped out of the top six places in the league, and for much of the season, Tottenham sat in fourth place, a UEFA Champions League spot. On the final day of the season, however, Tottenham's squad was struck down by illness and Spurs were defeated by West Ham United, meaning they missed out on Champions League qualification and finished in fifth place. Nevertheless, Jol had led Tottenham to their highest league finish since 1990, which meant they had qualified for the UEFA Cup via the league for the first time since the ban on English clubs playing in Europe was lifted in 1990. The season saw Tottenham concede just 38 league goals, the fewest the club has conceded since 1971.

The 2006–07 season saw Jol's team defeating Chelsea, the first against them in the league since 1990. In the Football League Cup, they were knocked-out in the semi-finals by rivals Arsenal. A 4–0 FA Cup win away to Fulham, however, kick-started a run of form which saw Tottenham take 27 points from their final 12 league games, losing just once. This run saw Spurs surge into fifth place, securing UEFA Cup qualification on the final day of the season, making Jol the first Spurs manager since Keith Burkinshaw to qualify for European football in successive seasons. Tottenham also reached the quarter-finals of the UEFA Cup and the FA Cup, losing to the eventual winners in both.

In the summer of 2007, Tottenham signed a number of expensive players spending around £40 million. It has been reported that some of these players were signed on the request of Director of Football Damien Comolli and that Jol was not allowed to select players he wanted to buy, such as Martin Petrov. When the suggestion of selling star striker Dimitar Berbatov arose, Jol claimed, "I'd rather die."

Because of the large amount of money that had been spent, Spurs were expected by the board to challenge for a top four place in the 2007–08 season. After Tottenham lost their opening two games, however, Club Secretary John Alexander and Director Paul Kemsley were photographed in a Spanish hotel with Sevilla manager Juande Ramos. Ramos claimed that Tottenham had made him a "dizzying offer" to become their manager, though this was denied by Tottenham's chairman Daniel Levy. This undermined Jol's position, and he was eventually sacked by the Tottenham board on 25 October 2007 during their 2–1 defeat to Getafe in the UEFA Cup. News of the sacking was widely known around the ground before the final whistle, before even Jol had become aware of his fate. Jol confessed that he first became aware of the decision when his nephew told him of a text message he received saying Jol was to leave the job.

Jol rejected an approach from Birmingham City to discuss their managerial vacancy in November 2007, but was reported at the time as interested in returning to Premiership football to manage one of the clubs outside the "top four."

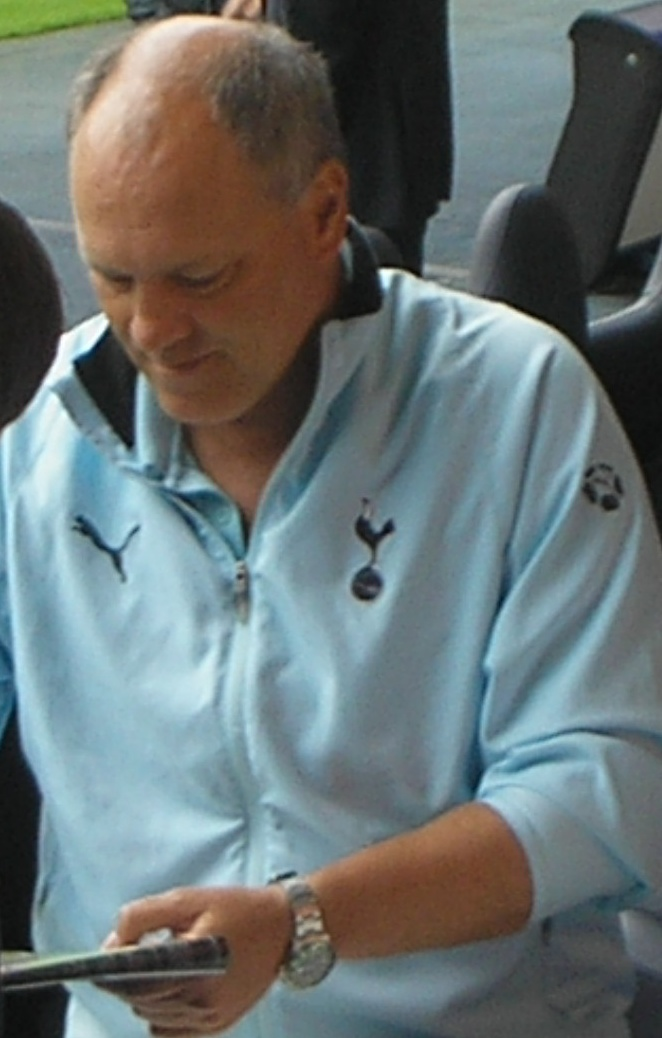
Jol during his period as Tottenham manager.

=== Hamburg ===
From the 2008–09 season, Jol began coaching German Bundesliga club Hamburger SV. Hamburg was at the top of the league standings and ended up finishing in fifth place, qualifying for the Europa League for the following season. Hamburg also reached the semi-finals of the UEFA Cup and the German League Cup, which were both lost against Werder Bremen. This was the first time since the 1980s that Hamburg reached the semi-finals in both competitions.

=== Ajax ===
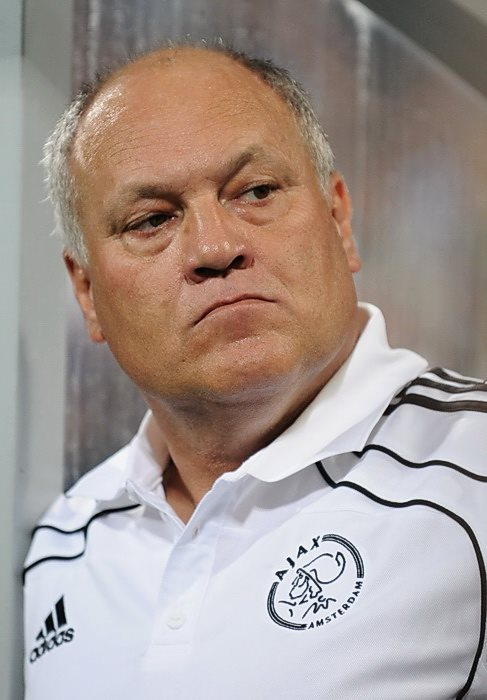
Jol with Ajax in 2010.

On 26 May 2009, it was announced that Jol was to be the new head coach of Ajax, taking over from Marco van Basten, who resigned at the end of the season. Jol showed his happiness at returning to his home country and on 28 May 2009, he officially signed a three-year contract.

After winning their opening two games of the season, Jol's Ajax lost away to PSV and then drew with Sparta Rotterdam at home, a result that saw them slip down to seventh place in the Eredivisie. This was the only game, however, in which they dropped points at home all season. They ended the season with the league's strongest defence and the fewest league goals conceded by any Dutch team in five years, including just four conceded at home all season. Even more remarkably, they scored 106 league goals – an average of more than three per game – the most any Dutch side has scored since the 1997–98 season. This meant that Ajax ended the season with a goal difference of +86. PSV, who had the next best goal difference in the league, had only half of this with +43.

Jol's side did not drop a single point after January, winning their final 14 games of the season. This meant that they finished with 85 points, a 17-point improvement on the previous season and a tally that would have been enough to win the league in all but two of the seasons since 1995, when the rules of the Eredivisie changed to award three points for a win instead of two. They were beaten to the title by one point, however, by Steve McClaren's Twente, who won their first-ever Eredivisie title.

Jol had some consolation for the season, winning the Dutch Cup, his first trophy since winning the same competition 13 years earlier with Roda JC, by beating Feyenoord 6–1 on aggregate in the first two-leg final since 1983. During the summer of 2010, Jol was the subject of an unsuccessful attempt by Fulham to make him their new manager; Ajax refused to let him leave the club. In the same month, Jol led Ajax to the Champions League, for the first time since the 2005–06 UEFA Champions League. On 6 December 2010, Jol resigned as manager of Ajax with immediate effect after a 1–1 home draw to NEC Nijmegen that left the Amsterdam-based club in fourth place, with a five-point distance from the top of the league, after 17 games. Ajax would go on to win the Eredivisie championship under new manager Frank de Boer.

=== Fulham ===
On 7 June 2011, it was announced that Jol had signed a two-year contract to take up the vacant post at Premier League side Fulham, after Mark Hughes' departure. He joined the club almost a year after nearly becoming their manager before Hughes' appointment. "I am very happy to join Fulham. It is a club with good, solid foundations and a great fan base," he said. "I am looking forward to being part of the Fulham family and thank the chairman for the trust shown in me." Jol's first game in charge of Fulham was the UEFA Europa League first round first leg against Faroese side NSÍ Runavík on 30 June 2011, Fulham winning 3–0. Jol's first Premier League game in charge was at home against Aston Villa on 13 August 2011, the game ending in a 0–0 draw. In his first season with the club, he led them to ninth place in the Premier League, collecting 52 points, one point off of Fulham's record points tally in the top division. They claimed some notable upsets during the season, including victories over Arsenal, Newcastle United, and Liverpool, plus a credible 2–2 draw against eventual league champions Manchester City. They also earned two draws against London rivals Chelsea and beat local rivals Queens Park Rangers first 6–0 at home and then 1–0 away.

It had been reported that during the first half of the season, Jol had fallen out with striker Bobby Zamora. Zamora subsequently left Fulham to go to QPR and join up with former Fulham manager Mark Hughes. It was a successful first season for Jol, as Fulham finished only 12 points and three places outside of Europa League qualification.

In the second season Fulham finished 12th place and Jol extended his contract for another year until 30 June 2014. Jol was sacked as Fulham manager on 1 December 2013 after six successive defeats in all competitions, the last of which was a 3–0 defeat to West Ham in which Fulham failed to register a single shot on target.

=== Al Ahly ===
On 24 February 2016, Jol was appointed as the new coach of the Egyptian Premier League club, Al-Ahly. On 19 August 2016, he was sacked because of his bad performance in the 2016 CAF Champions League competition. On 20 August 2016, Ahly SC made a farewell party to thank Jol and to celebrate the premier league achievement.

== Managerial statistics ==
As of match played 13 June 2016.

| Team | From | To | Record | | | | |
| Team | From | To | G | W | D | L | Win % |
|---|---|---|---|---|---|---|---|
| Roda JC | 1 November 1996 | 7 March 1998 | 57 | 29 | 7 | 21 | 50.88 |
| RKC Waalwijk | November 1998 | 10 June 2004 | 209 | 79 | 44 | 86 | 37.80 |
| Tottenham Hotspur | 5 November 2004 | 25 October 2007 | 148 | 67 | 38 | 43 | 45.27 |
| Hamburger SV | 1 July 2008 | 30 June 2009 | 53 | 32 | 7 | 14 | 60.38 |
| Ajax | 1 July 2009 | 6 December 2010 | 77 | 50 | 16 | 11 | 64.94 |
| Fulham | 7 June 2011 | 1 December 2013 | 113 | 38 | 28 | 47 | 33.63 |
| Al Ahly | 24 February 2016 | 19 August 2016 | 31 | 20 | 6 | 5 | 64.52 |
| Total | | | 688 | 315 | 146 | 227 | 45.78 |

== Honours ==
=== Player ===
ADO Den Haag

- Eerste Divisie: 1985–86
- KNVB Cup: 1974–75

Individual

- Player of the year, KNVB second division (Eerste Divisie) 1985

=== Manager ===
SVV Scheveningen

- Overall Amateur League National Champion season 1995/1996

Roda JC

- KNVB Cup: 1996–97

Ajax

- KNVB Cup: 2009–10

Al Ahly

- Egyptian Premier League: 2015–16

Individual

- Eredivisie Manager of the Year: 2000–01
- Premier League Manager of the Month: December 2004
