= Melvin Plet =

Dutch footballer

Personal information
- Date of birth: 18 July 1974 (age 52)
- Place of birth: The Hague, Netherlands
- Height: 1.80 m (5 ft 11 in)
- Positions: Midfielder; defender

Senior career*
Years	Team	Apps	(Gls)
1995–1997	Dordrecht'90	43	(0)
1997–1999	Roda JC	17	(1)
1999–2002	TOP Oss	74	(1)
Total		134	(2)
- * Club domestic league appearances and goals

Melvin Plet (born 18 July 1974 in The Hague) is a Dutch footballer who played for Eerste Divisie and Eredivisie clubs Dordrecht'90, Roda JC and TOP Oss during the 1995–2002 football seasons.

== Honours ==
Roda JC

- KNVB Cup: 1996–97
