= Jan-Pieter Martens =

Belgian footballer

Personal information
- Date of birth: 23 September 1974 (age 52)
- Place of birth: Bilzen, Belgium
- Height: 1.77 m (5 ft 9 1/2 in)
- Position: Midfielder

Youth career
- –1984: Lanaken VV
- 1984–1985: FC Camara
- 1985–1989: K.S.C. Hasselt
- 1989–1993: KV Mechelen

Senior career*
Years	Team	Apps	(Gls)
1993–1996	KV Mechelen		
1996–1998	Roda JC	31	(5)
1998–2003	SK Sturm Graz	74	(10)
2003–2004	TuS FC Arnfels	3	(0)
2004–2005	FC Untersiebenbrunn	22	(1)

Managerial career
- 2012–2013: Sint-Truidense V.V. (technical director)
- 2013–2019: FC Schalke 04 (team manager)
- 2026-: Dunajská Streda (Sport dir.)
- * Club domestic league appearances and goals

Jan-Pieter Martens (born 23 September 1974) is a Belgian former footballer who played as a midfielder. From 2013 to 2019 he was team manager at FC Schalke 04.

== Career ==
Martens began his professional career at K.V. Mechelen, where he was a member of the first team from 1993. For the 1996/97 season he moved to Roda JC Kerkrade, with whom he won the 1997 KNVB Cup. From January 1998 to June 2003, he played for SK Sturm Graz, with whom he was Austrian champion in 1998 and 1999 and Austrian cup winner in 1999. He also took part in the 1998/99, 1999/00 and 2000/01 UEFA Champions League seasons. From 2003 to 2005 he ended his career at TuS FC Arnfels and SC Untersiebenbrunn.

He also played futsal for 1. FSC Graz.

On 29 February 2012, Martens became technical director of Sint-Truidense V.V. He left the club again for the 2013/14 season and acted as team manager of FC Schalke 04 until April 2019.

== Honours ==
Roda JC

- KNVB Cup: 1996–97
