= Michel Sablon =

Belgian football manager

Michel Sablon is a Belgian football manager.

== Playing career ==
As a player, Sablon played for Belgian side Merchtem during the 1970s.

== Managerial career ==
Sablon was part of the staff for the Belgium national team at the 1986, 1990, and 1994 FIFA World Cups. In 2001, he was appointed technical director of the Belgium national team. He is credited with helping lay the foundations for the twenty-first century "golden generation" of the Belgium national team.

In 2015, he was appointed technical director of the Singapore national team. After that, he was appointed technical director of the United Arab Emirates national team. He has also worked for FIFA.
