= Ramon van Haaren =

Dutch footballer

Personal information
- Full name: Ramon van Haaren
- Date of birth: 16 September 1972 (age 54)
- Place of birth: Waalwijk, Netherlands
- Height: 1.80 m (5 ft 11 in)
- Position: Defender

Senior career*
Years	Team	Apps	(Gls)
1993–1996	RKC	83	(0)
1996–2001	Roda JC	133	(2)
2001–2005	Feyenoord	14	(0)
2005	→ Sparta (loan)	17	(0)
2005–2007	RKC	44	(0)
Total		291	(2)
- * Club domestic league appearances and goals

Ramon van Haaren (born 16 September 1972) is a Dutch former footballer. In his 14-year lasting career, he played for RKC Waalwijk, Roda JC, Feyenoord and Sparta Rotterdam.

Van Haaren was a defender who was born in Waalwijk and made his debut in professional football, being part of the RKC Waalwijk squad in the 1993-94 season. He ended his career in 2007, during his second stint at RKC. He also had an injury-plagued spell at Feyenoord and the club loaned him to city rivals Sparta as well.

== Honours ==
Roda JC

- KNVB Cup: 1996–97, 1999–2000
