= Jos Vaessen =

Belgium businessman (born 1944)

- Born: 21 March 1944 (age 81)

Jos Vaessen (born 21 March 1944) was president of the Belgian football team KRC Genk from 2001 until 2006 and founder of the company Vasco.
