= Kevin Van Dessel =

Belgian footballer

Personal information
- Date of birth: 9 April 1979 (age 47)
- Place of birth: Kapellen, Belgium
- Height: 1.80 m (5 ft 11 in)
- Position: Midfielder

Team information
- Current team: Club Brugge (assistant manager)

Senior career*
Years	Team	Apps	(Gls)
1996–1997	Germinal Ekeren	3	(0)
1997–1998	NAC Breda	2	(0)
1998–1999	Genoa	0	(0)
1999–2007	Roda JC Kerkrade	172	(10)
2007–2008	Sint-Truiden	21	(0)
2008–2010	VVV-Venlo	43	(1)
2010–2011	APOP Kinyras Peyias FC	18	(0)
2011–2015	EVV	76	(2)

International career
1992–1993	Belgium U15	2	(0)
1995–1997	Belgium U18	15	(0)
1996–1998	Belgium U19	17	(7)
2000–2002	Belgium U21	18	(1)

Managerial career
- 2011–2016: Roda JC Kerkrade (youth)
- 2015–2017: EVV Echt (assistant)
- 2016–2018: Genk (U17)
- 2017–2018: EVV Echt
- 2018–2020: Genk (U21)
- 2020–2022: Mechelen (assistant)
- 2022–2024: Genk (assistant)
- 2024–2025: Gent (assistant)
- 2025–2026: Roda JC Kerkrade
- 2026–: Club Brugge (assistant)
- * Club domestic league appearances and goals

Kevin Van Dessel (born 9 April 1979) is a Belgian football coach and a former player who is the assistant coach of Club Brugge.

== Coaching career ==
On 2 June 2025, Van Dessel returned to the Dutch club Roda JC Kerkrade, for which he played for many years, as a manager, on a one-season contract.

On 23 June 2026, Van Dessel was hired as an assistant coach by Club Brugge.

== Honours ==
Roda JC

- KNVB Cup: 1999–2000
