= Koen Jansen (footballer) =

Dutch footballer (born 2004)

Personal information
- Date of birth: 11 March 2004 (age 22)
- Place of birth: Wijchen, Netherlands
- Position: Left-back

Team information
- Current team: Roda JC
- Number: 5

Youth career
- –2016: Alverna
- 2016–2018: NEC
- 2018–2021: PSV

Senior career*
Years	Team	Apps	(Gls)
2022–2024	Jong PSV	28	(1)
2024–	Roda JC	26	(1)

International career
2021	Netherlands U18	4	(0)
2022	Netherlands U19	3	(0)
- * Club domestic league appearances and goals as of 25 April 2026

Koen Jansen (born 11 March 2004) is a Dutch professional footballer who plays as a left-back for Eerste Divisie club Roda JC.

== Club career ==
=== PSV ===
Jansen played youth football for Alverna and NEC, before joining to PSV's academy in 2018. In June 2021, he signed his first professional contract, keeping him at the club until 2024. Jansen made his professional debut with Jong PSV in the Eerste Divisie, the Dutch second division. On 10 January 2022, he earned his first start under coach Ruud van Nistelrooy in a match against Almere City, with Jansen providing two assists in a 5–1 win.

On 9 February 2024, Jansen netted his first professional goal, opening the score against Emmen in a 3–0 victory.

=== Roda JC ===
In May 2024, Jansen signed a two-year contract with Roda JC, joining on a free transfer following the expiration of his contract with PSV. During the pre-season for the 2023–24 campaign, he suffered an injury in a friendly against 1. FC Köln's reserves.

Jansen made his competitive debut for Roda on 1 September, replacing Brian Koglin during half-time in a 4–1 home loss to De Graafschap.

== International career ==
Jansen gained his first international cap for the Netherlands under-18 team on 6 September 2021, in a 5–0 friendly win against Italy U18 in 's-Gravenzande and made five appearances at this level. On 21 September 2022, he earned his first cap for the Netherlands U19 team in a 2–0 victory over Moldova U19 in Hardenberg, appearing in three matches for the under-19 squad.

== Career statistics ==
As of match played 16 September 2024

Appearances and goals by club, season and competition
Club	Season	League			KNVB Cup		Other		Total	
Club	Season	Division	Apps	Goals	Apps	Goals	Apps	Goals	Apps	Goals
Jong PSV	2021–22	Eerste Divisie	1	0	—		—		1	0
Jong PSV	2022–23	Eerste Divisie	5	0	—		—		5	0
Jong PSV	2023–24	Eerste Divisie	22	1	—		—		22	1
Jong PSV	Total		28	1	—		—		28	1
Roda JC	2024–25	Eerste Divisie	3	0	0	0	—		3	0
Career total			31	1	0	0	0	0	31	1
