= Tom Soetaers =

Belgian football coach and former player

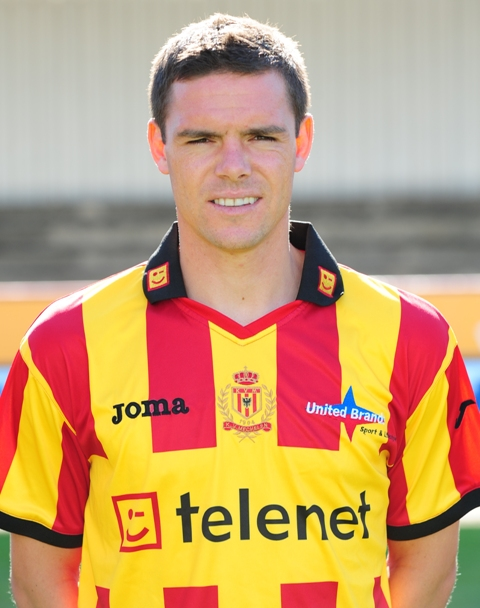

Personal information
- Full name: Tom Soetaers
- Date of birth: 21 July 1980 (age 46)
- Place of birth: Tienen, Belgium
- Height: 1.74 m (5 ft 9 in)
- Position: Left winger

Team information
- Current team: SC Hoegaarden-Outgaarden (Head coach)

Senior career*
Years	Team	Apps	(Gls)
1998–2000	Anderlecht	6	(0)
2000–2004	Roda JC	98	(23)
2004–2005	Ajax	17	(4)
2005–2009	Genk	99	(19)
2009	KV Kortrijk	8	(0)
2010–2011	KV Mechelen	17	(3)
2011–2012	Olympia SC Wijgmaal		
2015–2016	SC Hoegaarden-Outgaarden		

International career
1997–1998	Belgium U18	13	(6)
1998–1999	Belgium U19	9	(4)
2000–2002	Belgium U21	18	(3)
2002–2005	Belgium	8	(1)

Managerial career
- 2016–2017: SC Hoegaarden-Outgaarden
- 2017: Olympia SC Wijgmaal
- 2018–: SC Hoegaarden-Outgaarden
- * Club domestic league appearances and goals

Tom Soetaers (born 21 July 1980) is a Belgian former footballer who played as a midfielder and current football coach, mostly being deployed as a left-winger. He is currently in charge of SC Hoegaarden-Outgaarden.

== Club career ==
Soetaers began his career at Belgian side Anderlecht where he made just seven appearances for the first team before moving to the Netherlands to play for Roda JC. He spent three years at Roda becoming a big part of their team and was signed by league rivals AFC Ajax. However Soetaers failed to ever really establish himself at the club and after just over a year he returned to his home country with K.R.C. Genk.

On his return to Belgium Soetaers managed to rediscover the form he showed at Roda JC and helped the side to qualify for the UEFA Champions League for two seasons. He also won the Belgian Cup in 2008–09 with K.R.C. Genk, beating K.V. Mechelen in the final. On 21 June 2009, Soetaers signed a two-year contract with K.V. Kortrijk, but after only 6 months he went to KV Mechelen, in a transfer deal that included Giuseppe Rossini who went the other way.

Soetaers currently has eight caps for Belgium winning his first in 2003 in a match against Poland.

Currently Soetaers is working for the TV channel 2Be.

== Honours ==
Roda JC

- KNVB Cup: 1999–2000

Genk

- Belgian Cup: 2008–09
