= Hennie de Romijn =

Dutch footballer

Personal information
- Full name: Hendrik de Romijn
- Date of birth: 23 February 1968 (age 58)
- Place of birth: Leiden, Netherlands
- Position: Left back

Youth career
- VTL
- LV Roodenburg

Senior career*
Years	Team	Apps	(Gls)
1988–1989	Willem II	16	(0)
1989–1991	Excelsior	55	(8)
1991–1993	NEC	66	(9)
1993–1995	FC Den Haag	54	(6)
1995–1998	Dordrecht'90	66	(3)
1998–2001	NEC	57	(1)
Total		314	(27)
- * Club domestic league appearances and goals

Hennie de Romijn (born 23 February 1968) is a Dutch former footballer, who played as a left back.

== Club career ==
De Romijn's first season of professional football, with Willem II during 1988–89, was in the Dutch Eredivisie. He subsequently played in the second division for nine seasons, representing Excelsior, NEC, FC Den Haag and Dordrecht'90 along the way. In 1998, De Romijn returned to NEC and to the Eredivisie, retiring three years later.
