= Bernard Tchoutang =

Cameroonian footballer

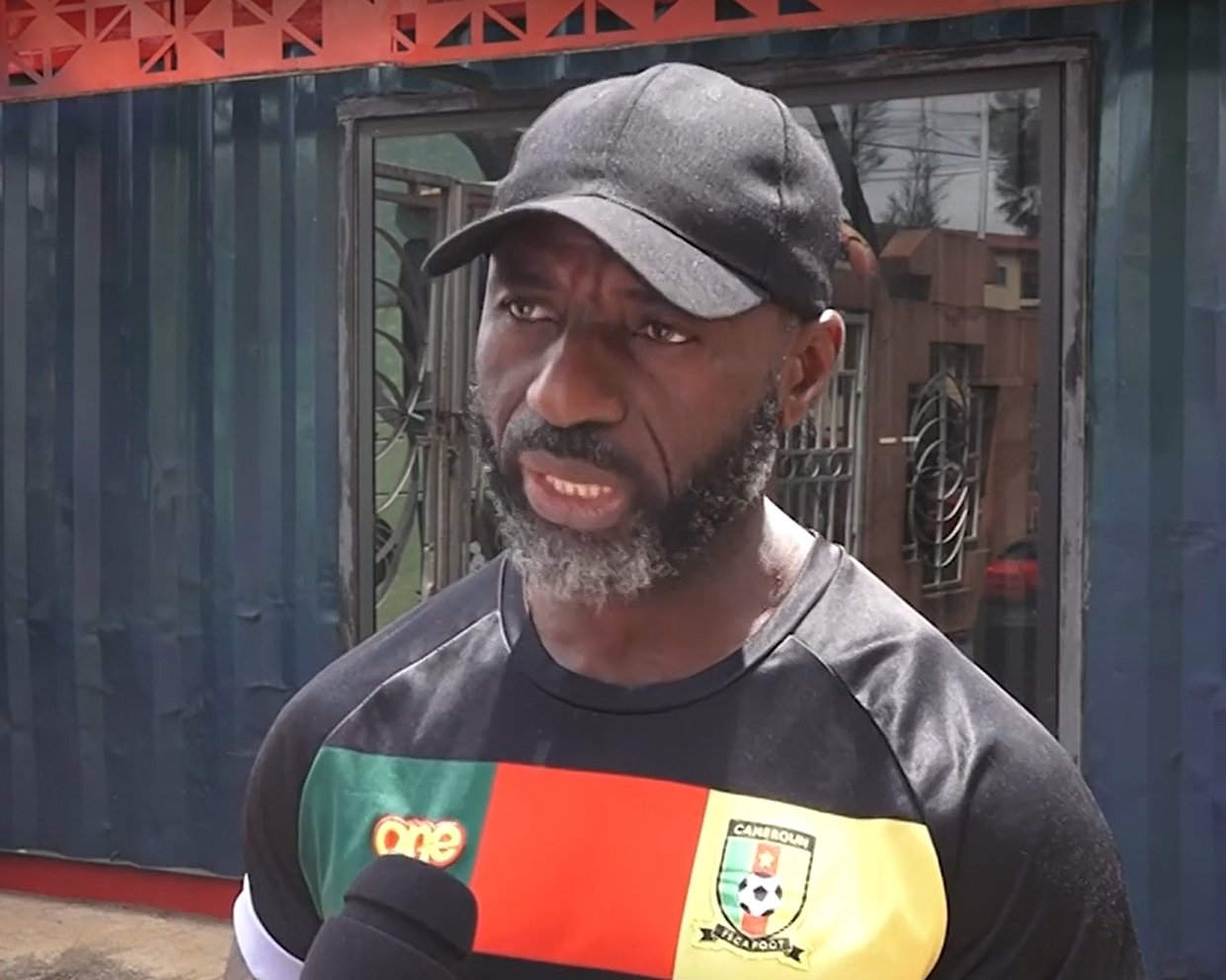
- Tchoutang in 2024

Personal information
- Full name: Bernard Samuel Tchoutang
- Date of birth: 2 September 1976 (age 50)
- Place of birth: Yaoundé, Cameroon
- Height: 1.77 m (5 ft 10 in)
- Position: Striker

Senior career*
Years	Team	Apps	(Gls)
1994	Tonnerre Yaoundé	0	(0)
1995–1997	Vanspor	78	(9)
1998–2002	Roda JC	88	(14)
2002–2005	Metalurh Donetsk	17	(3)
2003–2004	→ Viborg (loan)	5	(0)
2005	Metalurh Donetsk	0	(0)
2006–2007	Pahang	0	(0)
2007	Hapoel Petah Tikva	2	(0)
2007–2008	Elbasani		

International career
1993–2001	Cameroon	42	(10)
Medal record
Men's football
Representing Cameroon
Africa Cup of Nations
Winner	2000 Ghana-Nigeria
- * Club domestic league appearances and goals

Bernard Samuel Tchoutang (born 2 September 1976) is a Cameroonian former professional footballer who played as a striker. He was part of the victorious Cameroonian 2000 African Nations Cup team. He also took part at the 2001 FIFA Confederations Cup.

Tchoutang played for Vanspor in the Turkish Super Lig and Roda JC in the Dutch Eredivisie.

== Honours ==
Roda JC

- KNVB Cup: 1999–2000

Cameroon

- African Cup of Nations: 2000
