= Rick Plum =

Dutch footballer and manager

Personal information
- Date of birth: 12 June 1973 (age 53)
- Place of birth: Kerkrade, Netherlands
- Height: 1.72 m (5 ft 8 in)
- Position: Defender

Team information
- Current team: Roda JC Kerkrade (talent coach)

Senior career*
Years	Team	Apps	(Gls)
1993–1996	Roda JC	11	(0)
1996–2001	MVV	119	(0)
2001–2003	Den Bosch	42	(0)

Managerial career
- 2003–2004: MVV (youth coach)
- 2004–2009: Roda JC (youth coach)
- 2009–2010: Roda JC (head of academy)
- 2010–2018: Roda JC (assistant)
- 2013: Roda JC (interim manager)
- 2015: Roda JC (interim manager)
- 2017: Roda JC (interim manager)
- 2021–: Roda JC (talent coach)
- * Club domestic league appearances and goals

Rick Plum (born 12 June 1973) is a Dutch former footballer who played as a defender, and currently working as a talent coach at Roda JC Kerkrade.

== Managerial career ==
Plum was interim manager for Roda JC in the latter stage of the 2014–15 season in the Eerste Divisie and managed them into promotion to the Eredivisie, but stepped back after the season due to burning out and returned to his post as assistant manager. He again was interim manager for Roda JC in the Eredivisie on 25 May 2017, until the end of the season.

In 2018, Plum was diagnosed with Parkinson's disease and therefore decided in July to resign from his position in Roda. In the summer 2021, Plum returned to Roda as a talent coach.
