= Arno Doomernik =

Dutch footballer

Personal information
- Full name: Arnold Doomernik
- Date of birth: 14 August 1970 (age 56)
- Place of birth: 's-Hertogenbosch, Netherlands
- Height: 1.77 m (5 ft 9 1/2 in)
- Position: Defensive midfielder

Youth career
- OSC '45
- PSV

Senior career*
Years	Team	Apps	(Gls)
1990–1993	PSV	0	(0)
1992–1993	→ Sparta (loan)	19	(1)
1993–2002	Roda JC	209	(19)
2000–2002	→ NAC (loan)	20	(0)

International career
1988	Netherlands U18	1	(0)
- * Club domestic league appearances and goals

Arnold "Arno" Doomernik (born 14 August 1970) is a Dutch retired footballer who played as a defensive midfielder. He most notably played for Roda JC, where he won two KNVB Cup trophies. He also represented Sparta and NAC.

== Club career ==
Doomernik first played for OSC '45 and then became part of the youth academy of PSV, where he could not break into the first team. In 1992, he was loaned to Sparta, where he played for one season. In 1993, he was signed by Roda JC, where his former youth coach Huub Stevens had become the new manager. At Roda, he became part of a successful side which finished second in the 1994–95 Eredivisie, and which won the 1996–97 and 1999–2000 KNVB Cups.

During the summer of 2000, Doomernik was loaned to NAC, where he stayed for two seasons. He did not play any matches in his second season, however, as a serious hip injury forced his retirement. He played his last match in May 2001, at the age of 30.

== International career ==
Doomernik played for the Netherlands national under-18 football team.

== Personal life ==
Doomernik was a youth coach at NAC, Roda JC and VV Schaesberg before joining EHC in 2014. He was named assistent to head coach Jan van Dijk at Chevremont in 2020.

He is married to Darlene and the couple have two children.

== Honours ==
Roda JC

- KNVB Cup: 1996–97, 1999–2000
