= Regilio Vrede =

Dutch former professional footballer (born 1973)

Personal information
- Full name: Regilio Paul Vrede
- Date of birth: 18 January 1973 (age 53)
- Place of birth: Paramaribo, Suriname
- Position: Centre-back

Senior career*
Years	Team	Apps	(Gls)
1995–1996	RKC Waalwijk	32	(3)
1996–2002	Roda JC	161	(15)
2002–2003	Iraklis	12	(0)
2003–2004	Groningen	16	(2)
2004–2006	TOP Oss	9	(0)
Total		230	(20)

Managerial career
- 2006–2010: TOP Oss (assistant)
- 2011: AGOVV (assistant)
- 2013–2015: Roda JC (U21)
- 2013–2016: Roda JC (assistant)
- 2013: Roda JC (caretaker)
- 2015: Roda JC (caretaker)
- 2016–2018: RKC Waalwijk (assistant)
- 2019: NAC Breda (assistant)
- 2019–2020: Limburgia
- 2020–2021: MVV Maastricht (assistant)
- * Club domestic league appearances and goals

Regilio Vrede (born 18 January 1973) is a Dutch former professional footballer who played as a central defender. Born in Paramaribo, Suriname, Vrede made over 200 appearances for RKC Waalwijk, Roda JC, Iraklis, FC Groningen and TOP Oss.

== Coaching career ==
After retiring in the summer 2006, Vrede worked four years as an assistant manager under Hans de Koning at TOP Oss. Then from August 2010 to the end of the year, he worked as an analyst/advisor for AGOVV Apeldoorn before he changed role and was appointed as assistant manager for the club until the end of the season.

From the summer 2013, he became the manager of Roda JC's U21 squad and also a part of the first team squad as an assistant manager. During his time at the club, he was appointed as caretaker manager for the first team two times: From 15 December 2013 to 26 December 2016, and from 8 April 2015 to the end of the season. He left the club by the end of the 2015–16 season. From 2016 to 2018, he was then the assistant manager of RKC Waalwijk.

On 12 March 2019, it was confirmed that Vrede could take charge of SV Limburgia from the new season. However, on 22 March 2019, he was appointed as assistant manager of NAC Breda under newly appointed interim manager Ruud Brood for the rest of the season. The plan was that Vrede would leave NAC Breda at the end of the 2018–19 season, to start the new 2019–20 season as the manager of SV Limburgia. However, he ended up combining the two jobs, being in charge of Limburgia and continuing as an assistant coach at NAC. However, on 31 December 2019, he was fired from NAC.

After leaving NAC, Vrede continued in his position as a manager SV Limburgia, which he had been since July 2019. In February 2020, Limburgia announced that Vrede from the next season, the 2020–21 season, would function as technical advisor instead. However, instead of that, he was appointed assistant coach at MVV Maastricht in the summer 2020 under manager Darije Kalezić. He left the position at the end the season.

== Honours ==
Roda JC

- KNVB Cup: 1996–97, 1999–2000
