= Peter Van Houdt =

Belgian footballer

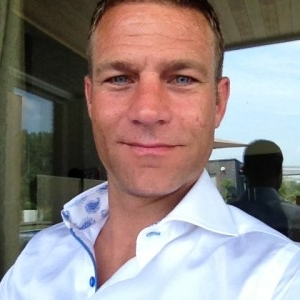

Personal information
- Date of birth: 4 November 1976 (age 49)
- Place of birth: Hasselt, Belgium
- Height: 1.76 m (5 ft 9 in)
- Position: Forward

Youth career
- 1982–1991: Herk Sport
- 1991–1994: Sint-Truiden

Senior career*
Years	Team	Apps	(Gls)
1994–1996	Sint-Truiden	61	(12)
1996–2000	Roda JC	122	(34)
2000–2004	Borussia Mönchengladbach	85	(20)
2004–2006	MSV Duisburg	71	(8)
2006–2009	Sint-Truiden	44	(12)
2009	RFC Liège	8	(2)
2009–2010	KSK Hasselt		

International career
1999–2002	Belgium	6	(0)

Managerial career
- 2010–2011: Jecora Herk (U17)
- 2011–2012: Herk Sport (assistant)
- 2012–2014: Herk Sport
- 2014–2016: KVK Wellen
- 2016–2019: RC Hades
- 2019–2020: ASV Geel
- * Club domestic league appearances and goals

Peter Van Houdt (born 4 November 1976) is a Belgian former professional footballer who played as a forward and manager.

== Playing career ==
Van Houdt started his professional career at Sint-Truiden and after playing four years for Roda JC in the Netherlands he spent several years in Germany with Borussia Mönchengladbach and MSV Duisburg. After his stay in Germany he came back to the club where it all started for him, Sint-Truiden.

== Coaching career ==
On 1 March 2010, it was confirmed that Van Houdt would become U17 manager for Jecora Herk and in the following season would become assistant manager for his former youth club Herk Sport under manager Dirk Verjans. After one season, he succeeded Verjans as manager of the club.

On 24 October 2014, Van Houdt left Herk Sport to become the manager of KVK Wellen. That cooperation was terminated by mutual agreement on 12 January 2016. Eleven months later, he became manager of RC Hades. He left the club at the end of the 2018–19 season.

A.S. Verbroedering Geel announced on 12 September 2019, that they had appointed Van Houdt as the club's new manager. In January 2020, due to financial difficulties, Geel announced that the club had released all players and technical staff, including Van Houdt.

== Honours ==
Roda JC

- KNVB Cup: 1996–97, 1999–2000
