= Mark Luijpers =

Dutch footballer (born 1970)

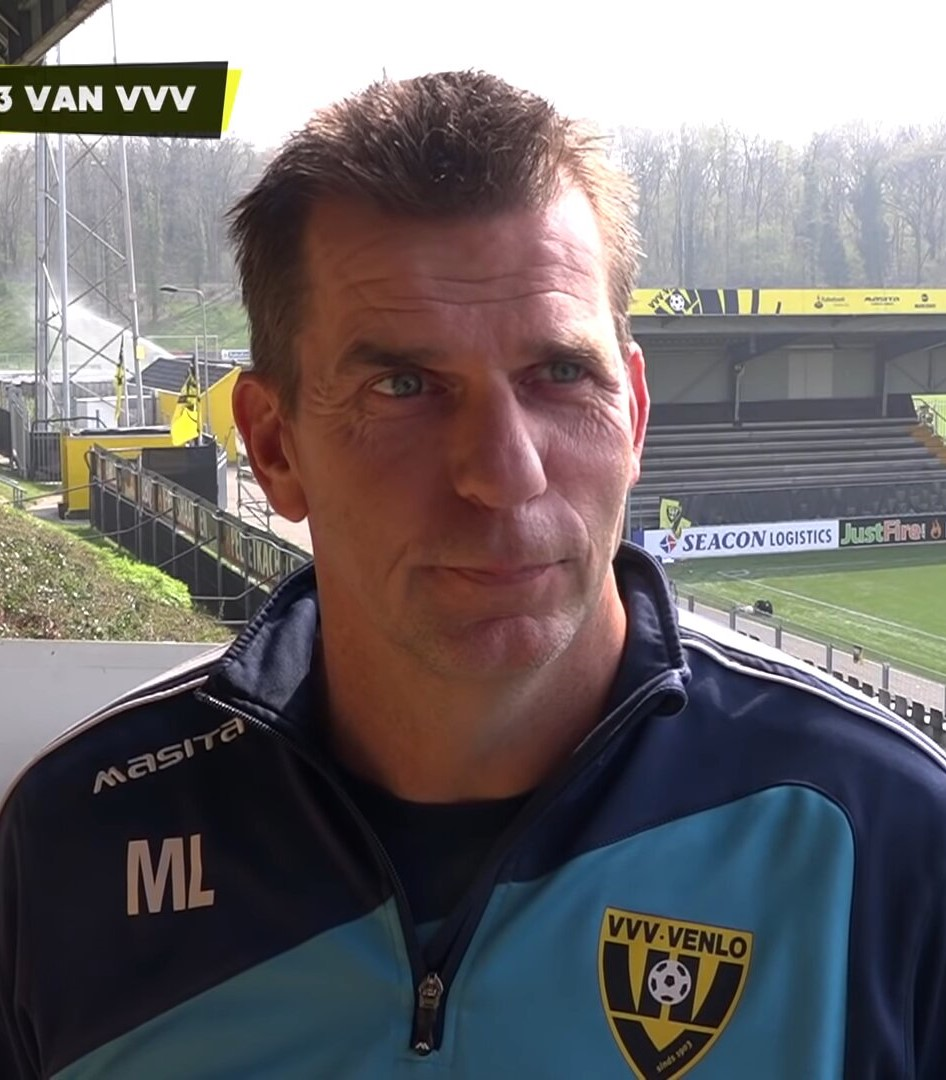
- Luijpers in 2019

Personal information
- Full name: Mark Luijpers
- Date of birth: 5 October 1970 (age 56)
- Place of birth: Cadier en Keer, Netherlands
- Height: 1.89 m (6 ft 2 1/2 in)
- Positions: Centre back; left back

Senior career*
Years	Team	Apps	(Gls)
1989–2005	Roda JC	376	(15)
1997–1998	→ MVV (loan)	32	(3)
2005–2007	MVV	62	(5)
- * Club domestic league appearances and goals

Mark Luijpers (born 5 October 1970) is a Dutch former footballer, who played as a defender. He has previously played as a centre back and as a left back.

During his career, Luijpers predominantly played for Roda JC in the Dutch Eredivisie (sixteen seasons). He also represented MVV, both in the Eredivisie (1997–98) and in the Eerste Divisie (2005–07).

== Honours ==
Roda JC

- KNVB Cup: 1996–97, 1999–2000
