= Eric van der Luer =

Dutch footballer and manager

Personal information
- Full name: Alphons Maria Eric Patrick van der Luer
- Date of birth: 16 August 1965 (age 61)
- Place of birth: Maastricht, Netherlands
- Height: 1.73 m (5 ft 8 in)
- Position: Midfielder

Youth career
- RKASV

Senior career*
Years	Team	Apps	(Gls)
1982–1987	MVV Maastricht	92	(14)
1987–1988	FC Assent	33	(9)
1988–2002	Roda JC	418	(36)
2002–2004	Alemannia Aachen	41	(1)
2004–2005	SV Meerssen		
2005–2008	RKSV Groene Ster		
Total		584	(60)

International career
1995	Netherlands	2	(0)

Managerial career
- 2008–2010: Alemannia Aachen (reserves)
- 2010–2011: Alemannia Aachen (assistant)
- 2012–2014: KFC Uerdingen 05
- 2015–2019: Jong Roda JC
- 2019: Roda JC (caretaker)
- * Club domestic league appearances and goals

Eric van der Luer (born 16 August 1965 in Maastricht, Netherlands) is a Dutch former professional footballer who played as a midfielder, spending most of his career with Roda JC. He made two appearances for the Netherlands national team.

He began his career with hometown club MVV in 1982 and spent five seasons there before playing with Belgian side Assent FC for a season. He joined Roda JC in 1988 and spent the next 14 seasons at the club, also winning two caps for his country. After joining Alemannia Aachen in 2002, van der Luer retired from professional football after the 2003–04 season. With Roda JC, van der Luer won the KNVB Beker (Dutch Cup) twice in (1996–97 and 1999–2000), scoring in both finals.

== Coaching career ==
From 2004 to 2008, van der Luer worked as a youth coach for Roda JC. In 2008, he then became manager of Alemannia Aachen's reserve team. He was later also appointed sporting director of the club's youth sector alongside his reserve team manager job. He stopped as manager for the reserve team at the end of the 2009–10 season and continued as head of the youth sector and assistant manager for the first team. He left the club in September 2011 alongside manager Peter Hyballa.

In July 2012 van der Luer became new manager of KFC Uerdingen 05. He guided the club to promotion to the Regionalliga in his first season. He was sacked in March 2014.

In 2015 he return to his old club Roda JC as manager for the second team, Jong Roda JC, and a scout for the first team. When Robert Molenaar was sacked as manager of Roda's first team in March 2019, van der Luer was installed as caretaker manager for the rest of the season. Van der Luer left the club at the end of the season, where his contract expired.

== Honours ==
Roda JC

- KNVB Cup: 1996–97, 1999–2000
