= 1996–97 KNVB Cup =

Tournament details
- Country: Netherlands
- Teams: 78

Final positions
- Champions: Roda JC
- Runners-up: sc Heerenveen

Tournament statistics
- Top goal scorer(s): Harry van der Laan (7 goals)

The 1996-97 KNVB Cup (at the time called Amstel Cup) was the 79th edition of the Dutch national football annual knockout tournament for the KNVB Cup. 78 teams contested, beginning on 1 June 1996 and ending at the final on 8 May 1997.

Roda JC beat sc Heerenveen 4–2 and won the cup for the first time.

== Teams ==
- All 18 participants of the Eredivisie 1996-97, four of which entering in the knock-out stage, the rest entering in the group stage
- All 18 participants of the Eerste Divisie 1996-97, entering in the group stage (only FC Den Bosch entered in the preliminary round)
- 39 teams from lower (amateur) leagues, six of which entering in the group stage, the rest entering in the preliminary round
- 3 youth teams, one entering in the group stage, the other two in the preliminary round

== Preliminary round ==
The matches of the preliminary round were played on 1, 2, 6 and 9 June 1996. Except for Eerste Divisie club FC Den Bosch, only amateur clubs and two youth teams participated.

| Home team | Result | Away team |
|---|---|---|
| VV Geldrop/AEK | 2–2 (p) | USV Holland |
| HSC '21 | 2–1 | HVV Hollandia |
| SC Genemuiden | 3–4 (aet) | De Treffers |
| VV DOVO | 2–1 | FC Lisse |
| Young sc Heerenveen | 1–5 | Quick Boys |
| IJsselmeervogels | 1–0 (aet) | SV Panningen |
| VV Hoogezand | 5–2 | RKFC Lindenheuvel |
| VV Sneek | 2–2 (p) | RKSV Wittenhorst |
| Quick '20 | 2–3 | Kozakken Boys (on June 15) |

| Home team | Result | Away team |
|---|---|---|
| Young Sparta | 4–1 | DCV |
| AFC '34 | 3–3 (p) | GVVV |
| VV Bennekom | 3–1 | DOS Kampen |
| VV Gemert | 2–4 | De Treffers |
| VV Katwijk | 2–0 | ACV |
| Achilles Veen | 1–1 (p) | AFC |
| RKSV Halsteren | 8–1 | FVC |
| RIOS '31 | 3–0 | VV Sittard |
| DCV | 2–6 | FC Den Bosch |

== Group stage ==
The matches of the group stage were played between August 15 and October 1, 1996. Except for four Eredivisie clubs, all other participants entered the tournament this round. 56 clubs participated, 28 advanced to the next round.

Group 1
| Team | Pts |
|---|---|
| 1. FC Emmen _{1} | 9 |
| 2. FC Groningen _{E} | 6 |
| 3. VV Appingedam _{A} | 3 |
| 4. VV Hoogezand _{A} | 0 |

Group 2
| Team | Pts |
|---|---|
| 1. sc Heerenveen _{E} | 9 |
| 2. Cambuur Leeuw. _{1} | 6 |
| 3. SV Urk _{A} | 3 |
| 4. VV Sneek _{A} | 0 |

Group 3
| Team | Pts |
|---|---|
| 1. FC Twente _{E} | 9 |
| 2. Veendam _{1} | 6 |
| 3. Young Ajax | 3 |
| 4. HSC '21 _{A} | 0 |

Group 4
| Team | Pts |
|---|---|
| 1. Vitesse Arnhem _{E} | 7 |
| 2. FC Zwolle _{1} | 4 |
| 3. GVVV _{A} | 3 |
| 4. VV DOVO _{A} | 3 |

Group 5
| Team | Pts |
|---|---|
| 1. Fortuna Sittard _{E} | 5 |
| 2. Helmond Sport _{1} | 3 |
| 3. MVV _{1} | 3 |
| 4. RIOS '31 _{A} | 2 |

Group 6
| Team | Pts |
|---|---|
| 1. Willem II _{E} | 9 |
| 2. FC Eindhoven _{1} | 6 |
| 3. FC Den Bosch _{1} | 3 |
| 4. Geldrop/AEK _{A} | 0 |

Group 7
| Team | Pts |
|---|---|
| 1. De Graafschap _{E} | 7 |
| 2. SC Heracles _{1} | 4 |
| 3. IJsselmeervogels _{A} | 3 |
| 4. De Treffers _{A} | 3 |

Group 8
| Team | Pts |
|---|---|
| 1. NAC Breda _{E} | 9 |
| 2. VV Baronie _{A} | 4 |
| 3. Dordrecht'90 _{1} | 3 |
| 4. Kozakken Boys _{A} | 3 |

Group 9
| Team | Pts |
|---|---|
| 1. RKC Waalwijk _{E} | 9 |
| 2. RBC Roosendaal _{1} | 6 |
| 3. RKSV Halsteren _{A} | 3 |
| 4. HSV Hoek _{A} | 0 |

Group 10
| Team | Pts |
|---|---|
| 1. TOP Oss _{1} | 6 |
| 2. SC Feyenoord _{A} | 6 |
| 3. FC Utrecht _{E} | 3 |
| 4. Young Sparta | 3 |

Group 11
| Team | Pts |
|---|---|
| 1. AZ _{E} | 7 |
| 2. Go Ahead Eagles _{1} | 6 |
| 3. AFC _{A} | 3 |
| 4. Excelsior _{1} | 1 |

Group 12
| Team | Pts |
|---|---|
| 1. NEC _{E} | 9 |
| 2. VVV-Venlo _{1} | 6 |
| 3. BVV/Verachtert _{A} | 1 |
| 4. VV Bennekom _{A} | 1 |

Group 13
| Team | Pts |
|---|---|
| 1. Sparta _{E} | 7 |
| 2. Telstar _{1} | 4 |
| 3. ADO Den Haag _{1} | 3 |
| 4. SVV Scheveningen _{A} | 1 |

Group 14
| Team | Pts |
|---|---|
| 1. FC Volendam _{E} | 7 |
| 2. VV Katwijk _{A} | 5 |
| 3. HFC Haarlem _{1} | 3 |
| 4. Quick Boys _{A} | 1 |

_{E} Eredivisie; _{1} Eerste Divisie; _{A} Amateur teams

== Knock-out Stage ==
=== First round ===
The matches of the first knock-out round were played on November 27, 1996. The four highest ranked Eredivisie teams from last season entered the tournament this round.

| Home team | Result | Away team |
|---|---|---|
| SC Heracles | 1–0 | Ajax _{E} |
| FC Volendam | 1–0 | SC Feyenoord (amateurs) |
| FC Emmen | 0–3 | FC Groningen |
| Telstar | 0–2 | De Graafschap |
| Cambuur Leeuwarden | 0–2 | Willem II |
| VV Baronie | 0–2 | Feyenoord _{E} |
| Sparta | 0–1 | FC Twente |
| FC Zwolle | 2–1 | Fortuna Sittard (on December 1) |

| Home team | Result | Away team |
|---|---|---|
| Roda JC _{E} | 6–2 | VV Katwijk |
| AZ | 4–1 | Go Ahead Eagles |
| RBC Roosendaal | 3–4 | NEC |
| sc Heerenveen | 3–2 (aet) | TOP Oss |
| Vitesse Arnhem | 3–2 | FC Eindhoven |
| VVV-Venlo | 1–2 | PSV _{E} |
| Veendam | 1–2 | RKC Waalwijk |
| Helmond Sport | 1–1 (p) | NAC Breda |

_{E} four Eredivisie entrants

=== Round of 16 ===
The matches of the round of 16 were played between February 7 and 12, 1997.

| Home team | Result | Away team |
|---|---|---|
| FC Zwolle | 2–1 | FC Volendam |
| FC Twente | 0–0 (p: 3-5) | Vitesse Arnhem |
| SC Heracles | 2–4 | Helmond Sport |
| sc Heerenveen | 2–0 | NEC Nijmegen |
| Feyenoord | 1–0 | RKC Waalwijk |
| PSV | 2–3 | AZ |
| Willem II | 2–0 | FC Groningen |
| De Graafschap | 0–2 | Roda JC (on February 19) |

=== Quarter finals ===
The quarter finals were played on March 11 and 12, 1997.

| Home team | Result | Away team |
|---|---|---|
| FC Zwolle | 0–5 | Roda JC |
| Helmond Sport | 2–1 | Vitesse Arnhem |
| sc Heerenveen | 2–1 | Feyenoord |
| AZ | 0–2 | Willem II |

=== Semi-finals ===
The semi-finals were played on April 16 and 17, 1997

| Home team | Result | Away team |
|---|---|---|
| Roda JC | 1–0 | Willem II |
| sc Heerenveen | 5–0 | Helmond Sport |

=== Final ===
8 May 1997
18:00 CEST

| Roda JC | 4–2 | Heerenveen |
|---|---|---|
| Sibon 4'; Senden 16'; Van der Luer 48'; Schops 56' | Report | Korneev 12'; Talan 83' |

De Kuip, Rotterdam
Attendance: 48,000
Referee: Hans Reygwart

Roda JC would participate in the Cup Winners' Cup.
