= Roda JC Kerkrade =

Dutch professional association football club

Roda JC
- Full name: Sportvereniging Roda; Juliana Combinatie Kerkrade
- Nicknames: De Koempels (The Miners); De Trots van het Zuiden (The Pride of the South); De Limburgers (The Limburgers)
- Founded: 27 June 1962; 64 years ago
- Stadium: Parkstad Limburg Stadion
- Capacity: 19,979
- Owner(s): Bert Peels; Stijn Koster; Roger Hodenius; Mercurius
- CEO: Jordens Peters
- Head coach: Rob Penders
- League: Eerste Divisie
- 2025–26: Eerste Divisie, 8th of 20
- Website: rodajckerkrade.nl
| Home colours | Away colours | Third colours |

Sportvereniging Roda Juliana Combinatie Kerkrade (Dutch pronunciation: [ˈspɔrtfəˌreːnəɣɪŋ ˈroːdaː jyliˈjaːnaː kɔmbiˈnaː(t)si ˈkɛr(ə)kˌraːdə]; Ripuarian: Sjport Verainiejoeng Roda Juliana Combinaatsiejoeën Kirchroa [ˈʃpɔχt fəˈʁaɪnijuŋ ˈʁoːdaː jyliˈjaːnaː kɔmbinaːtsiˈjuəŋ ˈkeʁəçʁoə]), shortly as Roda JC Kerkrade (pronounced [ˈroːdaː jeːˈseː ˈkɛr(ə)kˌraːdə]) or commonly Roda JC or simply Roda, is a Dutch professional football club based in Kerkrade, Netherlands. Roda JC Kerkrade plays in the Eerste Divisie. The club was founded by a merger between Rapid JC and Roda Sport in 1962. They were placed in the Eerste Divisie, and after a relegation they were promoted back to the top division in 1973, where they would stay for 41 years until being relegated in 2014. In 2009–10, they added Kerkrade to the name to create brand awareness and get financial support.

Roda JC is known as the "coal-miner's club"; fans of archrival club MVV, from the provincial capital of Maastricht, say those words condescendingly. However, in Kerkrade and the surrounding area, they are said with pride and respect, although the last Dutch coal mines were closed in the 1970s.

Roda JC's club honours include seven European campaigns and six KNVB Cup finals, of which they won two. One of its predecessors in club's "family tree" of mergers, Rapid JC, were champions of the Netherlands in 1956. Ten out of eleven players on that Rapid JC team were coal miners.

== History ==
The history of the forming of Roda JC

=== Merger (1955–1962) ===
Roda JC Kerkrade came into being as the result of a merger of several football clubs from Kerkrade. In 1954, SV Kerkrade (established 1926) and SV Bleijerheide (1914) merged to form Roda Sport. That same year, Rapid '54 (1954) and amateur club Juliana (1910) merged to form Rapid JC. Rapid JC was one of the most successful clubs of that time, winning the Championship play-off in 1956. In later years they would only finish in the top 10 once, when they finished second in the 1958–59 season. Roda Sport, however, were relegated to the Tweede Divisie and stayed there until the latest merger with Rapid JC, to form Roda JC.

=== Struggling and staying at the top division (1963–1994) ===
After the merger they began in the Eerste Divisie in the 1962–63 season, but were relegated the same season after finishing 16th. The following season they almost achieved promotion again, but they lost in the play-off and remained in the Tweede Divisie for eight years. After their return to the Eerste Divisie, it only took a further two seasons before they were promoted to the Eredivisie, when they finished first.

The club are finally in the premier division, but did not manage to qualify for a European competition even though they finished near the top several times. They only qualified for Europe once when they lost in the finals of the KNVB Cup in 1975, but they lost in the first round, 5–3 on aggregate, to Anderlecht. In the 1986–87 season they finally finished high enough for the UEFA Cup play-offs in the Netherlands, but lost their place to Utrecht. One year later they finished 15th and struggled to avoid relegation to the Eerste Divisie. They did, however, reach the finals of the KNVB Cup. Since PSV already had a place in Europe by winning the Eredivisie, Roda JC also earned a place in the European Cup. With the financial backing of entrepreneur Nol Hendriks, this was the club's most memorable European campaign, when Roda made it through the winter in the European Cup Winners' Cup before succumbing to the superb strikers of Bulgarian Sredets Sofia, Hristo Stoichkov, Lyuboslav Penev and Emil Kostadinov, who became superstars in Europe's major football leagues. Two years later, they finished fifth twice, but only once gained a place in a European competition. They did well in the KNVB Cup in 1990–91, reaching the semi-finals, and a year later reached the finals.

=== Dutch and European success (1994–2002) ===
Since 1994, the club has managed to achieve several successes both in Europe and the Netherlands during the Nol Hendriks era. Most notable was their second-place finish in the Eredivisie in 1994–95. They also won the KNVB Cup twice, in 1996–97 and 1999–2000. As a result of these successes, they qualified for several European competitions. In the 1997–98 UEFA Cup Winners' Cup, Roda was eliminated in the quarter-finals by Vicenza 1–9 on aggregate. Roda's most memorable European match was played on 28 February 2002. After a 0–1 defeat at the hands of Milan in Kerkrade, Roda caused panic at San Siro by winning the return leg by the same score (0–1). The only goal scored during this match was made by Mark Luijpers. Roda even took the lead in the penalty shoot-out, but ended up losing the series, only being one penalty away from eliminating Milan.

Since then, Roda have only qualified twice for the UEFA Intertoto Cup, in 2003–04 and 2004–05. In later years, they did manage to qualify for the play-offs but never won it.

Roda's position in Dutch football is best illustrated by their history in the KNVB Cup. Roda were good enough to make it to six finals, but the first three times and the last time the opponent in the final was one of the "Big Three" – and Roda went home with the silver medal: PSV won in 1976 and 1988 and Feyenoord in 1992 and 2008. However, in two of the club's cup finals, a non-Big Three side was the opponent. Both times, the cup went to Kerkrade: Heerenveen were defeated in 1997 and NEC in 2000.

=== Decline (2002–2013) ===
Since 1992, Roda have been in discussions with neighbours Fortuna Sittard, as well as MVV and VVV, with a view to merging to form a new club, named FC Limburg. A statement of intent was published by Roda and Fortuna in November 2008 and in early 2009 financial backing was found for the scheme. All these attempts, however, floundered.

In 2008, the club gained its final notable success by reaching the KNVB Cup final. In the final, opponent and home side Feyenoord proved to be too strong, winning 2–0. One year later, the two teams met again in De Kuip for the final round of the 2008–09 Eredivisie season. Roda JC needed a win to avoid direct relegation, and against all odds, Roda JC defeated Feyenoord to qualify for the promotion/relegation play-offs. Roda eventually won the play-offs, defeating Cambuur in a penalty shoot-out.

In 2010, the club added "Kerkrade" to its name, so the new full name of the sports club is now Roda JC Kerkrade. This was one of the conditions set by the municipality of Kerkrade, in return for their sponsorship.

Roda JC finished in 16th position in the 2012–13 Eredivisie season and were therefore again forced to participate in the play-offs. The Coal Miners came out victorious again after a late free-kick winner by Mark-Jan Fledderus against Sparta Rotterdam, extending the club's stay at the highest level for another season.

=== Relegations, Eerste Divisie and turmoil (2014–2019) ===
Roda JC finished 18th in the 2013–14 Eredivisie and were relegated in May 2014, ending a 41-year period at the highest level of Dutch football. They returned to the Eredivisie at the first attempt, however, defeating NAC Breda after extra time in the promotion play-off final.

In January 2017, Dubai-based businessman Aleksei Korotaev took a minority interest in the club and brought former French international Nicolas Anelka with him in an advisory role. Later that year, Korotaev was arrested on fraud charges in Dubai, after which Anelka ended his involvement with the club.

The club was relegated for a second time in May 2018, finishing the season in 16th place before losing 2–1 on aggregate to Almere City in the promotion and relegation play-offs. The following seasons in the Eerste Divisie were inconsistent, with the club finishing as low as 17th in the curtailed 2019–20 season and as high as fifth in 2021–22, when they were eliminated by Excelsior 4–2 on aggregate in the play-offs. The club also faced serious financial difficulties during this period, coming close to bankruptcy on several occasions.

In May 2019, Mexican investor Mauricio García de la Vega acquired 25% of the club's shares, though Roda faced a three-point deduction from the Royal Dutch Football Association (KNVB) in December 2019 for failing to disclose the transaction to the licensing commission beforehand. His involvement proved divisive; it later emerged that he had threatened several staff members, and on 27 September 2019 supporters chased him from the stadium. The club announced on 5 October 2019 that García de la Vega had withdrawn his investment. A consortium of local investors subsequently assumed control of 80% of the shares, with Korotaev retaining the remaining 20%, and pledged to cover the club's €900,000 debt. The KNVB approved the arrangement in January 2020, leaving the club debt-free.

=== Stabilisation (2020–present) ===
In September 2020, the Royal Dutch Football Association (KNVB) greenlit the acquisition of Roda JC, transferring ownership to the Roda JC Foundation. Spearheaded by a local consortium comprising entrepreneurs Stijn Koster, Bert Peels, Roger Hodenius, and investment firm Mercurius, the proposal emerged in May 2020 with the goal of propelling the club to the summit of the Eerste Divisie. Operating under the moniker Phoenix Group, they committed to injecting €1.5 million annually over the next three seasons, bracing for potential budget shortfalls. Simultaneously, they petitioned the Kerkrade municipality to slash Parkstad Limburg Stadion's rent to €250,000. The KNVB's nod signaled the official departure of principal shareholder Frits Schrouff, who had been at the helm since 2015.

Following successful on-field performances, securing playoff spots in 2021 and 2022, Roda JC faced a downturn in the 2022–23 season, finishing in 15th place. In response, the club appointed former Roda JC player Bas Sibum, then assistant coach at FC Emmen, as their new head coach for the 2023–24 season. Under his leadership, the team experienced a significant turnaround in results, propelling them into contention for promotion. On 3 May 2024, Roda JC fans prematurely celebrated their team's promotion to the Eredivisie after a 2–0 victory over Cambuur, believing they had secured a top-two finish. However, a 95th-minute equalizer by their direct rivals, Groningen, against Telstar denied Roda's promotion, extending the race to the final matchday. The stadium announcer had mistakenly announced their promotion due to a poor internet connection, leading Roda's supporters to invade the pitch at Parkstad Limburg Stadion. The premature pitch invasion made international news. On the final matchday, Roda lost a direct matchup to Groningen, meaning they had to compete in the playoffs for promotion. In the first round of the playoffs, Roda lost 8–1 on aggregate to NAC Breda, extending their stay in the second tier.

== Stadium ==
After the establishment of the club, Roda JC Kerkrade played in Sportpark Kaalheide with a capacity of 21,500 spectators. Its current stadium is the Parkstad Limburg Stadion, an all-seater stadium with a capacity of 19,979. It was opened on 15 August 2000 with a match against Spanish side Real Zaragoza, which ended in a 2–2 draw.

== Honours ==
Before their merger, Rapid JC had won the top league title once, in the 1955–56 season.

| League | Number | Years |
National
| KNVB Cup | 2× | 1996–97, 1999–2000 |
| Eerste Divisie | 1× | 1972–73 |

=== Runners-up ===
| League | Number | Years |
National
| Netherlands Football League Championship/Eredivisie | 1× | 1994–95 |
| KNVB Cup | 4× | 1975–76, 1987–88, 1991–92, 2007–08 |
| Johan Cruijff Schaal | 2× | 1997, 2000 |

== Domestic results ==
Below is a table with Roda JC's domestic results since 1962.

Domestic Results since 1962
| Domestic league | League result | Qualification to | KNVB Cup season | Cup result |
|---|---|---|---|---|
| 2025–26 Eerste Divisie | 8th | – (losing promotion/relegation play-offs) | 2025–26 | second round |
| 2024–25 Eerste Divisie | 12th | – | 2024–25 | first round |
| 2023–24 Eerste Divisie | 3rd | – (losing promotion/relegation play-offs) | 2023–24 | first round |
| 2022–23 Eerste Divisie | 15th | – | 2022–23 | first round |
| 2021–22 Eerste Divisie | 5th | – (losing promotion/relegation play-offs) | 2021–22 | second round |
| 2020–21 Eerste Divisie | 8th | – (losing promotion/relegation play-offs) | 2020–21 | first round |
| 2019–20 Eerste Divisie | 17th | – | 2019–20 | second round |
| 2018–19 Eerste Divisie | 13th | – | 2018–19 | round of 16 |
| 2017–18 Eredivisie | 16th | Eerste Divisie (relegation after promotion/relegation play-offs) | 2017–18 | quarter-finals |
| 2016–17 Eredivisie | 17th | – (surviving promotion/relegation play-offs) | 2016–17 | first round |
| 2015–16 Eredivisie | 14th | – | 2015–16 | quarter-final |
| 2014–15 Eerste Divisie | 3rd | Eredivisie (promotion) | 2014–15 | quarter-final |
| 2013–14 Eredivisie | 18th | Eerste Divisie (relegation) | 2013–14 | quarter-final |
| 2012–13 Eredivisie | 16th | – (surviving promotion/relegation play-offs) | 2012–13 | second round |
| 2011–12 Eredivisie | 10th | – | 2011–12 | third round |
| 2010–11 Eredivisie | 6th | – (losing EL play-offs) | 2010–11 | round of 16 |
| 2009–10 Eredivisie | 9th | – (losing EL play-offs) | 2009–10 | third round |
| 2008–09 Eredivisie | 16th | – (surviving promotion/relegation play-offs) | 2008–09 | quarter-final |
| 2007–08 Eredivisie | 9th | – (losing UC play-offs) | 2007–08 | final |
| 2006–07 Eredivisie | 6th | – (losing UC play-offs) | 2006–07 | quarter-final |
| 2005–06 Eredivisie | 8th | – (losing UC play-offs) | 2005–06 | semi-final |
| 2004–05 Eredivisie | 8th | Intertoto Cup (R3) | 2004–05 | third round |
| 2003–04 Eredivisie | 6th | Intertoto Cup (R3) | 2003–04 | second round |
| 2002–03 Eredivisie | 6th | – | 2002–03 | round of 16 |
| 2001–02 Eredivisie | 13th | – | 2001–02 | round of 16 |
| 2000–01 Eredivisie | 4th | UEFA Cup | 2000–01 | quarter-final |
| 1999–2000 Eredivisie | 8th | UEFA Cup | 1999–2000 | winners |
| 1998–99 Eredivisie | 5th | UEFA Cup | 1998–99 | round of 16 |
| 1997–98 Eredivisie | 14th | – | 1997–98 | round of 16 |
| 1996–97 Eredivisie | 6th | Cup Winners' Cup | 1996–97 | winners |
| 1995–96 Eredivisie | 4th | UEFA Cup | 1995–96 | semi-final |
| 1994–95 Eredivisie | 2nd | UEFA Cup | 1994–95 | second round |
| 1993–94 Eredivisie | 6th | – | 1993–94 | third round |
| 1992–93 Eredivisie | 11th | – | 1992–93 | third round |
| 1991–92 Eredivisie | 9th | – | 1991–92 | final |
| 1990–91 Eredivisie | 10th | – | 1990–91 | semi-final |
| 1989–90 Eredivisie | 5th | UEFA Cup | 1989–90 | quarter-final |
| 1988–89 Eredivisie | 5th | – | 1988–89 | second round |
| 1987–88 Eredivisie | 15th | Cup Winners' Cup | 1987–88 | final |
| 1986–87 Eredivisie | 4th | – (losing UC play-offs) | 1986–87 | first round |
| 1985–86 Eredivisie | 5th | – | 1985–86 | first round |
| 1984–85 Eredivisie | 11th | – | 1984–85 | first round |
| 1983–84 Eredivisie | 9th | – | 1983–84 | round of 16 |
| 1982–83 Eredivisie | 6th | – | 1982–83 | quarter-final |
| 1981–82 Eredivisie | 9th | – | 1981–82 | second round |
| 1980–81 Eredivisie | 11th | – | 1980–81 | round of 16 |
| 1979–80 Eredivisie | 7th | – | 1979–80 | quarter-final |
| 1978–79 Eredivisie | 5th | – | 1978–79 | round of 16 |
| 1977–78 Eredivisie | 6th | – | 1977–78 | quarter-final |
| 1976–77 Eredivisie | 5th | – | 1976–77 | round of 16 |
| 1975–76 Eredivisie | 8th | Cup Winners' Cup | 1975–76 | final |
| 1974–75 Eredivisie | 8th | – | 1974–75 | round of 16 |
| 1973–74 Eredivisie | 15th | – | 1973–74 | second round |
| 1972–73 Eerste Divisie | 1st | Eredivisie (promotion) | 1972–73 | second round |
| 1971–72 Eerste Divisie | 4th | – | 1971–72 | first round |
| 1970–71 Tweede Divisie | 5th | Eerste Divisie (promotion) | 1970–71 | first round |
| 1969–70 Tweede Divisie | 9th | – | 1969–70 | first round |
| 1968–69 Tweede Divisie | 4th | – | 1968–69 | first round |
| 1967–68 Tweede Divisie | 5th | – | 1967–68 | group stage |
| 1966–67 Tweede Divisie | 4th | promotion play-offs: no promotion | 1966–67 | DNC |
| 1965–66 Tweede Divisie | 5th (group B) | – | 1965–66 | group stage |
| 1964–65 Tweede Divisie | 4th (group B) | – | 1964–65 | round of 16 |
| 1963–64 Tweede Divisie | 3rd | promotion play-off: no promotion | 1963–64 | second round |
| 1962–63 Eerste Divisie | 16th | Tweede Divisie (relegation) | 1962–63 | third round |

== Players and staff ==
=== First-team squad ===
As of 10 September 2026

Note: Flags indicate national team as defined under FIFA eligibility rules; some limited exceptions apply. Players may hold more than one non-FIFA nationality.

| No. | Pos. | Nation | Player |
|---|---|---|---|
| 1 | GK | GER | Justin Treichel |
| 2 | DF | NED | Luuk Verheij |
| 3 | DF | NED | Marco Tol |
| 4 | MF | AUS | Josh Nisbet |
| 5 | DF | NED | Koen Jansen |
| 6 | MF | NED | Mitchel Paulissen |
| 7 | FW | NED | Cain Seedorf |
| 8 | MF | GER | Jeremiah Mensah (on loan from Bayer Leverkusen U19) |
| 9 | FW | CUW | Anthony van den Hurk (captain) |
| 10 | FW | GER | Fynn Schenten (on loan from 1. FC Köln) |
| 11 | MF | NED | Dyon Dorenbosch |
| 14 | DF | NED | Xander van den Berg |
| 15 | MF | BEL | Lucas Beerten |

| No. | Pos. | Nation | Player |
|---|---|---|---|
| 17 | DF | POR | Guilherme Peixoto (on loan from Twente) |
| 19 | FW | NED | Noah Crabu |
| 20 | MF | ALG | Mokrane Bentoumi |
| 21 | GK | GER | Martin Stojcevic |
| 22 | MF | NED | Rayan Khoums |
| 24 | MF | BEL | Jérôme Déom |
| 25 | DF | NED | Bram Marsman |
| 26 | FW | NED | Joey Sleegers |
| 27 | DF | BEL | Keanu Van Mieghem |
| 28 | GK | NED | Jay-Jay Vandamme |
| 29 | FW | FRA | Zakarya Khaldi |
| 32 | MF | NED | Nadir Maoujoudi |
| 33 | DF | BEL | Dario Van den Buijs |

=== Current staff ===
As of 2 July 2025

| Name | Function |
Coaching staff
| (Belgium) Kevin Van Dessel | Head coach |
| (Netherlands) Wim Dusseldorp (Netherlands) Maurice Verbunt | Assistant coaches |
| (Belgium) Patrick Creemers | Goalkeeper coach |
| (Iran) Shahin Rassi | Individual/technique trainer |
Data & Analysis
| (Netherlands) Daan Soentjens | Data analyst |
Medical & Performance staff
| (Netherlands) Jim Snackers (Netherlands) Dominic Bednas | Physiotherapists |
| (Netherlands) Peter Rolfs | Performance physiotherapist |
Support & Technical staff
| (Netherlands) Tjerk van Eggelen | Team manager / Video analyst |
| (Netherlands) Fred Thomassen (Netherlands) Ton van Laar | Equipment managers |

== Former players ==
=== National team players ===
The following players were called up to represent their national teams in international football and received caps during their tenure with Roda JC Kerkrade:

- Australia
  - (Australia) Graham Arnold (1990–1992)
  - (Australia) Tomi Juric (2015–2016)
  - (Australia) Zeljko Kalac (1998–2002)
  Belgium
  - (Belgium) Bob Peeters (1997–2000)
  - (Belgium) Tom Soetaers (2000–2004)
  - (Belgium) Joos Valgaeren (1997–2000)
  - (Belgium) Peter Van Houdt (1996–2000)
  Burundi
  - (Burundi) Mohamed Amissi (2022–2023)
  Cameroon
  - (Cameroon) Bernard Tchoutang (1998–2002)
  Canada
  - (Canada) Marcel de Jong (2006–2010)
  Curaçao
  - (Curaçao) Doriano Kortstam (2015–2017)
  Cyprus
  - (Cyprus) Nestoras Mytidis (2016–2017)
  Denmark
  - (Denmark) John Eriksen (1980–1984)
  - (Denmark) Mads Junker (2009–2012)
  - (Denmark) Marc Nygaard (1998–2002)
  - (Denmark) Morten Skoubo (2009–2011)
  - (Denmark) Sten Ziegler (1974–1979)
  Estonia
  - (Estonia) Andres Oper (2005–2009)
- Finland
  - (Finland) Richard Jensen (2018–2022)
  Gambia
  - (The Gambia) Edrissa Sonko (2000–2007)
  Ghana
  - (Ghana) Eric Addo (2003; 2009)
  Hungary
  - (Hungary) László Bodnár (2004–2006)
  - (Hungary) Boldizsár Bodor (2004–2011)
  - (Hungary) Tamás Kádár (2012–2013)
  - (Hungary) Krisztián Németh (2012–2014)
  Israel
  - (Israel) Motti Ivanir (1986–1988)
  Ivory Coast
  - (Ivory Coast) Sekou Cissé (2004–2009)
  - (Ivory Coast) Arouna Koné (2003–2005)
  Kosovo
  - (Kosovo) Donis Avdijaj (2018)
  Lebanon
  - (Lebanon) **Daniel Lajud (2025–present)**
  Morocco
  - (Morocco) Adil Ramzi (2006–2007; 2011–2013)
  Netherlands
  - (Netherlands) Henk Fraser (1988–1990)
  - (Netherlands) René Hofman (1979–1986; 1989–1992)
  - (Netherlands) Jan Jongbloed (1977–1981)
  - (Netherlands) Johan de Kock (1994–1996)
- **Netherlands** (continued)
  - (Netherlands) Adrie Koster (1977–1979)
  - (Netherlands) John van Loen (1988–1990)
  - (Netherlands) Eric van der Luer (1988–2002)
  - (Netherlands) Dick Nanninga (1974–1982)
  - (Netherlands) Wilbert Suvrijn (1986–1989)
  - (Netherlands) Pierre Vermeulen (1974–1980)
  New Zealand
  - (New Zealand) Ivan Vicelich (2001–2006)
  Nigeria
  - (Nigeria) Tijani Babangida (1991–1996)
  - (Nigeria) Garba Lawal (1996–2002)
  Northern Ireland
  - (Northern Ireland) Adrian Coote (2000)
  Norway
  - (Norway) Pa-Modou Kah (2004–2011)
  Poland
  - (Poland) Przemysław Tytoń (2007–2011)
  Suriname
  - (Suriname) Roland Alberg (2019–2021)
  Syria
  - (Syria) Sanharib Malki (2011–2013)
  Turkey
  - (Turkey) Fatih Sonkaya (1998–2004)

- Players in bold actively play for Roda JC Kerkrade and for their respective national teams. Years in brackets indicate careerspan with Roda JC.

=== National team players by Confederation ===
Member associations are listed in order of most to least amount of current and former Roda JC Kerkrade players represented Internationally

Total national team players by confederation
| Confederation | Total | (Nation) Association |
|---|---|---|
| AFC | 5 | Australia (3), Lebanon (1), Syria (1) |
| CAF | 9 | Ivory Coast (2), Nigeria (2), Burundi (1), Cameroon (1), (The Gambia) Gambia (1), Ghana (1), Morocco (1) |
| CONCACAF | 3 | Canada (1), Curaçao (1), Suriname (1) |
| CONMEBOL | 0 | |
| OFC | 1 | New Zealand (1) |
| UEFA | 32 | Netherlands (10), Denmark (5), Belgium (4), Hungary (4), Cyprus (1), Estonia (1), Finland (1), Israel (1), Kosovo (1), Northern Ireland (1), Norway (1), Poland (1), , Turkey (1) |

== Players in international tournaments ==
The following is a list of Roda JC players who have competed in international tournaments, including the FIFA World Cup, FIFA Confederations Cup, UEFA European Championship, Africa Cup of Nations, CONCACAF Gold Cup, and the OFC Nations Cup. To this date no Roda JC players have participated in the Copa América, or the AFC Asian Cup while playing for Roda JC Kerkrade.

| Cup | Players |
|---|---|
| (Argentina) 1978 FIFA World Cup | (Netherlands) Jan Jongbloed (Netherlands) Dick Nanninga |
| (Italy) UEFA Euro 1980 | (Netherlands) Dick Nanninga |
| (West Germany) UEFA Euro 1988 | (Netherlands) Wilbert Suvrijn |
| (Italy) 1990 FIFA World Cup | (Netherlands) Henk Fraser (Netherlands) John van Loen |
| (England) UEFA Euro 1996 | (Netherlands) Ruud Hesp (Netherlands) Johan de Kock |
| (France) 1998 FIFA World Cup | (Nigeria) Garba Lawal |
| (Ghana) (Nigeria) 2000 Africa Cup of Nations | (Cameroon) Bernard Tchoutang |
| (Belgium) (Netherlands) UEFA Euro 2000 | (Belgium) Joos Valgaeren |
| (French Polynesia) 2000 OFC Nations Cup | (Australia) Zeljko Kalac |
| (New Zealand) 2002 OFC Nations Cup | (New Zealand) Ivan Vicelich |
| (France) 2003 FIFA Confederations Cup | (New Zealand) Ivan Vicelich |
| (Australia) 2004 OFC Nations Cup | (New Zealand) Ivan Vicelich |
| (United States) 2009 CONCACAF Gold Cup | (Canada) Marcel de Jong |

== Coaches ==
| Name | From | To |
|---|---|---|
| (Netherlands) Piet Thomas | 1962 | 1963 |
| (Germany) Michel Pfeiffer | 1963 | 1965 |
| (Netherlands) Wiel Coerver | 1965 | 1966 |
| (Netherlands) Adam Fischer | 1966 | 1968 |
| (Netherlands) Breur Weyzen | 1969 | 1971 |
| (Netherlands) Jacques Koole | 1971 | November 1972 |
| (Netherlands) Hennie Hollink | November 1972 | February 1974 |
| (Germany) Fritz Pliska | February 1974 | 1974 |
| (Netherlands) Bert Jacobs | 1974 | 1980 |
| (Netherlands) Piet de Visser | 1980 | 1983 |
| (Netherlands) Hans Eijkenbroek | 1984 | November 1984 |
| (Netherlands) Eugene Gerards | November 1984 | December 1984 |
| (Netherlands) Frans Körver | December 1984 | 1986 |
| (Netherlands) Rob Baan | 1986 | October 1987 |
| (Netherlands) Rob Jacobs | October 1987 | 1988 |
| (Netherlands) Jan Reker | 1988 | 1991 |
| (Netherlands) Adrie Koster | 1991 | March 1993 |
| (Netherlands) Huub Stevens | March 1993 | 9 October 1996 |
| (Netherlands) Eddy Achterberg | 9 October 1996 | 1 November 1996 |
| (Netherlands) Martin Jol | 1 November 1996 | 7 March 1998 |
| (Netherlands) Theo Vonk | 28 February 1998 | 30 June 1998 |
| (Netherlands) Sef Vergoossen | 1 July 1998 | 1 July 2001 |
| (Netherlands) Jan van Dijk | 1 July 2001 | 19 September 2001 |
| (Belgium) Georges Leekens | 19 September 2001 | 30 June 2002 |
| (Netherlands) Wiljan Vloet | 1 July 2002 | 30 June 2005 |
| (Netherlands) Huub Stevens | 1 July 2005 | 2 February 2007 |
| (Netherlands) Raymond Atteveld | 2 February 2007 | 7 October 2008 |
| (Netherlands) Martin Koopman (interim) | 7 October 2008 | 19 November 2008 |
| (Belgium) Harm van Veldhoven | 20 November 2008 | 30 June 2012 |
| (Netherlands) Ruud Brood | 1 July 2012 | 15 December 2013 |
| (Netherlands) Regillio Vrede & (Netherlands) Rick Plum (interim) | 15 December 2013 | 26 December 2013 |
| (Denmark) Jon Dahl Tomasson | 26 December 2013 | 26 May 2014 |
| (Netherlands) René Trost | 1 June 2014 | 8 April 2015 |
| (Netherlands) Regillio Vrede & (Netherlands) Rick Plum (interim) | 8 April 2015 | 11 June 2015 |
| (Switzerland) Darije Kalezić | 11 June 2015 | 10 May 2016 |
| (Greece) Yannis Anastasiou | 18 June 2016 | 23 May 2017 |
| (Netherlands) René Trost & (Netherlands) Rick Plum (interim) | 23 May 2017 | 21 June 2017 |
| (Netherlands) Robert Molenaar | 21 June 2017 | 19 March 2019 |
| (Netherlands) Eric van der Luer (interim) | 19 March 2019 | 13 May 2019 |
| (Netherlands) Jean-Paul de Jong | 11 June 2019 | 8 February 2020 |
| (Netherlands) Jurgen Streppel | 10 June 2020 | 15 December 2022 |
| (Netherlands) Remond Strijbosch (interim) | 15 December 2022 | 24 January 2023 |
| (Netherlands) Edwin de Graaf | 24 January 2023 | 30 June 2023 |
| (Netherlands) Bas Sibum | 1 July 2023 | 30 June 2025 |
| (Netherlands) Kevin van Dessel | 1 July 2025 | present |

== Sponsors ==
| Sponsor | 2023-24 |
|---|---|
| Main | De Energie Bedrijfadviseur Limburg |
| Shirt | Kipsta |
| Back 1 | MASCOT Workwear |
| Back 2 | Jorc Industrial |
| Back 2 | PC Tronic |
| Sleeve | Stienstra Wonen |
| Pants | du ROI |

== Supporters ==
Although not the most vocal, the supporters of Roda JC are generally considered to be among the most loyal and well behaved in the Netherlands. In the early days of the club, Kaalheide was the club's home ground. Initially, supporters could roam free over the terraces. However, in the 1970s, fences were placed between the various sections, preventing supporters to move from one stand to the other. The fanatical supporters decided to unite at the covered north side stand, creating an old fashioned, atmospheric stand. Kaalheide became an infamous stadium for visiting teams.

Since moving to the Parkstad Limburg Stadium in the summer of 2000, the more fanatical supporters can be found behind the goal on the West side. The West Stand was renamed 'Koempel Tribune' (Miner Stand) in September 2014 to honour the fans who remained loyal to the club after the relegation four months earlier.

Since 1989, there is a close friendship between the supporters of TSV Alemannia Aachen and Roda JC Kerkrade. Fans of both clubs regularly visit each other's games. The clubs have the tradition to play a preparation match for the coming season, each and every year. It is not uncommon that fans from both clubs get together, march towards the stadium as one group, and walk into a stand as one. They cheer and clap for every goal.

== Rivalries ==
Roda JC has three provincial rivals, namely Fortuna Sittard, MVV and VVV-Venlo. The arch rival is MVV, the team from the provincial capital of Maastricht. The Roda JC-MVV rivalry is considered to be the number one rivalry in the province of Limburg by both sets of supporters.

During the 1990s, the rivalry between Roda JC and Fortuna Sittard intensified, as both clubs were relatively successful during that period. Fanatical supporters of both clubs have clashed regularly ever since. This increased rivalry also created animosity between hooligans of Roda JC and the Belgian Limburg club K.R.C. Genk, stemming from the friendship between Fortuna Sittard and K.R.C. Genk.

Due to the distance between Kerkrade and Venlo, the rivalry with VVV-Venlo is considered to be a minor one by the majority of the Roda JC supporters.

== See also ==
- Sporting Limburg
