= 2013–14 FC Twente season =

Twente
2013–14 season
- Chairman: Joop Munsterman
- Manager: Michel Jansen (Interim)
- Eredivisie: 3rd
- KNVB Cup: Second round vs Heerenveen
- Top goalscorer: League: Dušan Tadić (16); All: Dušan Tadić (16)

The 2013–14 FC Twente season was the club's 30th in the Eredivisie since their promotion in 1984. They participated in the league, finishing third, and the KNVB Cup, where they were eliminated by Heerenveen in the second round. It was Michel Jansen's only full season as manager while Alfred Schreuder earned his coaching badges.

== Squad ==
Note: Flags indicate national team as defined under FIFA eligibility rules; some limited exceptions apply. Players may hold more than one non-FIFA nationality.

No.	Pos.	Nation	Player
1	GK	NED	Sander Boschker
2	DF	NED	Dico Koppers
3	DF	DEN	Andreas Bjelland
4	DF	NED	Peter Wisgerhof
5	DF	NED	Robbert Schilder
6	MF	NED	Wout Brama (captain)
7	FW	MAR	Youness Mokhtar
8	MF	NED	Kyle Ebecilio
9	FW	MNE	Luka Đorđević (on loan from Zenit Saint Petersburg)
10	FW	SRB	Dušan Tadić
11	MF	MEX	Jesús Corona
12	FW	GER	Tim Hölscher
14	DF	GER	Nils Röseler
15	DF	VEN	Roberto Rosales
16	DF	NED	Tim Breukers

No.	Pos.	Nation	Player
17	DF	SWE	Rasmus Bengtsson
18	DF	CUW	Cuco Martina
19	MF	GHA	Shadrach Eghan
20	GK	NED	Sonny Stevens
21	MF	CHI	Felipe Gutiérrez
22	GK	NED	Nick Marsman
23	MF	NED	Joey Pelupessy
24	MF	NED	Quincy Promes
25	MF	NED	Bilal Ould-Chikh
27	MF	NED	Dario Tanda
28	DF	PER	Renato Tapia
30	FW	NED	Luc Castaignos
31	FW	NOR	Torgeir Børven
34	FW	SVK	Andrej Rendla
35	GK	POL	Filip Bednarek

=== On loan ===
Note: Flags indicate national team as defined under FIFA eligibility rules; some limited exceptions apply. Players may hold more than one non-FIFA nationality.

No.	Pos.	Nation	Player
—	GK	POR	Daniel Fernandes (at OFI Crete until 30 June 2014)
—	MF	NED	Willem Janssen (at FC Utrecht until 30 June 2014)

No.	Pos.	Nation	Player
—	FW	NED	Jerson Cabral (at ADO Den Haag until 30 June 2014)
—	FW	NED	Felitciano Zschusschen (at FC Dordrecht until 30 June 2014)

== Transfers ==
=== Summer ===
In: Note: Flags indicate national team as defined under FIFA eligibility rules; some limited exceptions apply. Players may hold more than one non-FIFA nationality.

No.	Pos.	Nation	Player
2	DF	NED	Dico Koppers (from (Netherlands) Ajax)
8	MF	NED	Kyle Ebecilio (from (England) Arsenal)
7	FW	NED	Youness Mokhtar (from (Netherlands) PEC Zwolle)
18	DF	CUW	Cuco Martina (from (Netherlands) RKC Waalwijk)
20	GK	NED	Sonny Stevens (from (Netherlands) FC Volendam)

Out: Note: Flags indicate national team as defined under FIFA eligibility rules; some limited exceptions apply. Players may hold more than one non-FIFA nationality.

No.	Pos.	Nation	Player
7	MF	NED	Denny Landzaat
8	MF	NED	Leroy Fer (to (England) Norwich City)
9	FW	RUS	Dmitri Bulykin (to (Russia) Volga Nizhny Novgorod)
11	FW	NED	Jerson Cabral (loan to (Netherlands) ADO Den Haag)
13	GK	BUL	Nikolay Mihaylov (to (Italy) Hellas Verona)
14	MF	NED	Willem Janssen (loan to (Netherlands) FC Utrecht)
19	DF	NED	Douglas (to (Russia) Dynamo Moscow)
20	DF	NED	Edson Braafheid (loan return to (Germany) 1899 Hoffenheim)
22	FW	BEL	Nacer Chadli (to (England) Tottenham Hotspur)
25	GK	POR	Daniel Fernandes (loan to (Greece) OFI Crete)
26	FW	NED	Joshua John (to (Denmark) Nordsjælland)
45	FW	NED	Edwin Gyasi (to (Netherlands) Heracles Almelo)
—	FW	SWE	Emir Bajrami (to (Greece) Panathinaikos)
—	FW	NED	Glynor Plet (to (Netherlands) Zulte Waregem)

=== Winter ===
In: Note: Flags indicate national team as defined under FIFA eligibility rules; some limited exceptions apply. Players may hold more than one non-FIFA nationality.

No.	Pos.	Nation	Player
31	FW	NOR	Torgeir Børven (from (Norway) Vålerenga)

Out: Note: Flags indicate national team as defined under FIFA eligibility rules; some limited exceptions apply. Players may hold more than one non-FIFA nationality.

No.	Pos.	Nation	Player
26	FW	NED	Felitciano Zschusschen (loan to (Netherlands) FC Dordrecht)

== Competitions ==
=== Eredivisie ===
==== Results summary ====
Overall								Home						Away					
Pld	W	D	L	GF	GA	GD	Pts	W	D	L	GF	GA	GD	W	D	L	GF	GA	GD
34	17	12	5	72	37	+35	63	9	8	0	43	17	+26	8	4	5	29	20	+9

==== Results by round ====
Round	1	2	3	4	5	6	7	8	9	10	11	12	13	14	15	16	17	18	19	20	21	22	23	24	25	26	27	28	29	30	31	32	33	34
Ground	H	A	H	A	H	H	A	H	A	H	A	H	A	H	A	A	H	A	H	H	A	A	A	H	H	A	A	H	A	H	A	H	A	H
Result	D	W	W	L	D	D	W	W	W	D	L	D	D	W	W	W	W	D	W	W	W	L	D	W	D	D	L	W	L	D	W	W	W	D
Position	9	5	3	3	3	6	3	1	1	1	1	3	5	3	3	3	3	3	3	3	3	2	2	2	2	2	3	2	4	3	3	3	3	3

Source: see below
A = Away; H = Home; W = Win; D = Draw; L = Loss

==== Results ====
3 August 2013 1	Twente	0 – 0	RKC Waalwijk	Enschede
19:45 CET (UTC+1)		Report	Anderson (yellow card) 76'; Lamey (yellow card) 89'	Stadium: De Grolsch Veste; Attendance: 28,700; Referee: Dennis Higler

11 August 2013 2	Feyenoord	1 – 4	Twente	Rotterdam
12:30 CEST (UTC+2)	Pellè 29'; Van Deelen (red card) 57'; De Vrij (yellow card) 41' (yellow-red card) 66'; Mathijsen (yellow card) 72'	Report	Ebecilio 37'; Tadić 58' (pen.), 73' (pen.); Castaignos 79'	Stadium: De Kuip; Attendance: 43,000; Referee: Richard Liesveld

18 August 2013 3	Twente	6 – 0	Utrecht	Enschede
16:30 CEST (UTC+2)	Promes 8', 68', (yellow card) 54'; Tadić 11' (pen.); Castaignos 25', 36'; Bengtsson 90'	Report	Mårtensson (yellow card) 11'	Stadium: De Grolsch Veste; Attendance: 29,700; Referee: Pol van Boekel

25 August 2013 4	Vitesse Arnhem	1 – 0	Twente	Arnhem
14:30 CEST (UTC+2)	Havenaar 22'	Report	Gutiérrez (yellow card) 74'	Stadium: GelreDome; Attendance: 14,745; Referee: Serdar Gözübüyük

31 August 2013 5	Twente	1 – 1	Heerenveen	Enschede
18:45 CEST (UTC+2)	Eghan (yellow card) 48'; Koppers (yellow card) 81'; Bengtsson (yellow card) 85', (goal) 90'	Report	Van Anholt (yellow card) 57'; Van den Berg 64'; Kums (yellow card) 69'; Otigba (yellow card) 85'; Fazli (yellow card) 88'	Stadium: De Grolsch Veste; Attendance: 29,100; Referee: Kevin Blom

14 September 2013 6	Twente	2 – 2	PSV Eindhoven	Enschede
20:45 CEST (UTC+2)	Eghan 17'; Bengtsson (yellow card) 23'; Koppers (yellow card) 42'; Promes 70'; Đorđević (yellow card) 90+3'	Report	Matavž (yellow card) 54'; Wijnaldum 66'; Depay 83'	Stadium: De Grolsch Veste; Attendance: 29,750; Referee: Pol van Boekel

21 September 2013 7	Heracles	0 – 3	Twente	Almelo
18:45 CEST (UTC+2)	Quansah (yellow card) 20'; Uth (yellow card) 42'; Te Wierik (yellow card) 43'; Koenders (yellow card) 74'; Linssen (yellow card) 83'	Report	Bengtsson 17'; Eghan (yellow card) 22'; Ebecilio (yellow card) 51', (goal) 72'; Tadić 75' (pen.)	Stadium: Polman Stadion; Attendance: 8,500; Referee: Danny Makkelie

29 September 2013 8	Twente	5 – 0	Groningen	Enschede
16:30 CET (UTC+1)	Botteghin 19' (o.g.); Eghan 28', 54'; Tadić 45' (pen.); Corona 85'	Report	Botteghin (yellow card) 37'; Wijnaldum (yellow card) 39'; Kappelhof (red card) 44'	Stadium: De Grolsch Veste; Attendance: 29,250; Referee: Reinold Wiedemeijer

4 October 2013 9	Cambuur	0 – 1	Twente	Leeuwarden
20:00 CET (UTC+1)	Droste (yellow card) 27'	Report	Castaignos 49'; Mokhtar (yellow card) 62'	Stadium: Cambuur Stadion; Attendance: 10,000; Referee: Richard Liesveld

19 October 2013 10	Twente	1 – 1	Ajax	Enschede
20:45 CEST (UTC+2)	Castaignos 22'; Bengtsson (yellow card) 90'	Report	Serero (yellow card) 71'; Sigþórsson 81'	Stadium: De Grolsch Veste; Attendance: 30,000; Referee: Pieter Vink

26 October 2013 11	ADO Den Haag	3 – 2	Twente	The Hague
18:45 CEST (UTC+2)	Bakker (yellow card) 39', (goal) 51'; Gouriye 55'; Alberg (yellow card) 66'; Van Duinen 88'; Țîră (yellow card) 90'	Report	Koppers (yellow card) 22'; Bengtsson (yellow card) 37'; Đorđević (yellow card) 65'; Bjelland (yellow card) 66'; Castaignos 69', (yellow card) 80'; Rosales 76'; Marsman (yellow card) 85'	Stadium: Kyocera Stadion; Attendance: 10,823; Referee: Tom van Sichem

2 November 2013 12	Twente	2 – 2	NEC	Enschede
19:45 CET (UTC+1)	Eghan 23'; Promes 34', (yellow card) 68'; Bengtsson (yellow card) 80'; Schilder (yellow card) 90+3'	Report	Rieks 53'; Jahanbakhsh (yellow card) 56'; Jantscher 60'	Stadium: De Grolsch Veste; Attendance: 29,200; Referee: Dennis Higler

10 November 2013 13	PEC Zwolle	1 – 1	Twente	Zwolle
12:30 CET (UTC+1)	Fernandez (yellow card) 47', (goal) 49'; Gravenbeek (yellow card) 53'	Report	Gutiérrez (yellow card) 44'; Promes 72'; Ebecilio (yellow card) 73'	Stadium: IJsseldelta Stadion; Attendance: 12,400; Referee: Kevin Blom

24 November 2013 14	Twente	5 – 2	NAC Breda	Enschede
16:30 CET (UTC+1)	Ebecilio 28', (yellow card) 58'; Castaignos (yellow card) 30', (goal) 53'; Rosales (yellow card) 41'; Tadić 45+2' (pen.); Promes 68', 86'	Report	Sarpong (yellow card) 28'; Van der Weg 42'; Verbeek 56'; Hadouir (yellow card) 74'	Stadium: De Grolsch Veste; Attendance: 29,900; Referee: Ed Janssen

29 November 2013 15	Roda JC	1 – 2	Twente	Kerkrade
20:00 CET (UTC+1)	Hupperts 39'; Luyckx (yellow card) 53'; Kali (yellow card) 90'	Report	Schilder (yellow card) 28'; Castaignos 69'; Promes 79'; Gutiérrez (yellow card) 89'; Tadić (yellow card) 90'	Stadium: Parkstad Limburg Stadion; Attendance: 13,905; Referee: Serdar Gözübüyük

7 December 2013 16	AZ	1 – 2	Twente	Alkmaar
19:45 CET (UTC+1)	Beerens 3'; Wuytens (yellow card) 35'	Report	Schilder (yellow card) 19'; Mokhtar 39', 90+2'; Rosales (yellow card) 51'; Corona (yellow card) 89'	Stadium: AFAS Stadion; Attendance: 16,021; Referee: Pieter Vink

14 December 2013 17	Twente	3 – 1	Go Ahead Eagles	Enschede
20:45 CET (UTC+1)	Gutiérrez 21'; Castaignos 56'; Bengtsson (yellow card) 57'; Tadić 62'	Report	Van der Linden 58' (pen.); Vriends (yellow card) 60'	Stadium: De Grolsch Veste; Attendance: 29,900; Referee: Richard Liesveld

20 December 2013 18	RKC Waalwijk	1 – 1	Twente	Waalwijk
20:00 CET (UTC+1)	Sno 42'; Amieux (yellow card) 81'	Report	Mokhtar (yellow card) 72'; Castaignos 80'; Tadić (yellow card) 90+1'	Stadium: Mandemakers Stadion; Attendance: 6,830; Referee: Pol van Boekel

17 January 2014 19	Twente	3 – 1	Heracles	Enschede
20:00 CET (UTC+1)	Promes 23'; Castaignos 55'; Tadić 88' (pen.)	Report	Veldmate (red card) 56'; Te Wierik (yellow card) 72'; Uth 76'	Stadium: De Grolsch Veste; Attendance: 29,750; Referee: Reinold Wiedemeijer

2 February 2014 21	Twente	3 – 1	Cambuur	Enschede
14:30 CET (UTC+1)	Tadić (yellow card) 47'; Castaignos 54'; Eghan 60'; Bengtsson 79'	Report	Leeuwin 25' (pen.); Bijker (yellow card) 54'; Van der Laan (yellow card) 58'; Lukoki (yellow card) 62'	Stadium: De Grolsch Veste; Attendance: 29,650; Referee: Pol van Boekel

5 February 2014 22	Heerenveen	0 – 2	Twente	Heerenveen
20:45 CET (UTC+1)		Report	Castaignos (yellow card) 50'; Bjelland (yellow card) 68'; Tadić 73'; Rosales (yellow card) 77'; Børven 90'	Stadium: Abe Lenstra Stadion; Attendance: 22,223; Referee: Richard Liesveld

8 February 2014 23	PSV Eindhoven	3 – 2	Twente	Eindhoven
18:45 CET (UTC+1)	Arias 7'; Locadia 23'; Willems 52'	Report	Promes 40'; Ebecilio 68'; Rosales (yellow card) 90+3'	Stadium: Philips Stadion; Attendance: 33,000; Referee: Kevin Blom

12 February 2014 20	Groningen	1 – 1	Twente	Groningen
19:45 CET (UTC+1)	Adorján 5'	Report	Tadić 77'	Stadium: Euroborg; Attendance: 19,555; Referee: Danny Makkelie

15 February 2014 24	Twente	2 – 0	Vitesse Arnhem	Enschede
18:45 CET (UTC+1)	Castaignos 55'; Eghan (yellow card) 64'; Tadić 78'	Report	Leerdam (yellow card) 4'; Vejinović (yellow card) 59'; Van Aanholt (red card) 60'	Stadium: De Grolsch Veste; Attendance: 29,900; Referee: Pieter Vink

23 February 2014 25	Twente	2 – 2	Feyenoord	Enschede
16:30 CET (UTC+1)	Bengtsson (yellow card) 32'; Castaignos 68'; Bjelland (yellow card) 83'; Martina 90+5'	Report	Pellè 14'; Boëtius 55'; Mulder (yellow card) 87'	Stadium: De Grolsch Veste; Attendance: 29,900; Referee: Serdar Gözübüyük

2 March 2014 26	Utrecht	1 – 1	Twente	Utrecht
12:30 CET (UTC+1)	Van der Maarel (yellow card) 24'; Oar 46'; Toornstra (yellow card) 69'	Report	Koppers (yellow card) 19'; Promes 18'; Martina (yellow card) 69'	Stadium: Stadion Galgenwaard; Attendance: 16,666; Referee: Tom van Sichem

9 March 2014 27	Go Ahead Eagles	1 – 0	Twente	Deventer
14:30 CET (UTC+1)	Antonia 33'	Report	Castaignos (yellow card) 69'	Stadium: De Adelaarshorst; Attendance: 7,938; Referee: Pol van Boekel

16 March 2014 28	Twente	2 – 1	AZ	Enschede
12:30 CET (UTC+1)	Koppers (yellow card) 39'; Rosales (yellow card) 61'; Mokhtar 69'; Tadić 90+3'	Report	Berghuis 40'; Poulsen (yellow card) 46'; Wuytens (yellow card) 57'	Stadium: De Grolsch Veste; Attendance: 29,075; Referee: Danny Makkelie

30 March 2014 30	Ajax	3 – 0	Twente	Amsterdam
14:30 CEST (UTC+2)	Denswil 29'; Schöne 58'; Bojan 65'	Report		Stadium: Amsterdam Arena; Attendance: 51,117; Referee: Pieter Vink

2 April 2014 29	Twente	1 – 1	ADO Den Haag	Enschede
18:45 CEST (UTC+2)	Gutiérrez 9'; Bengtsson (red card) 64'; Castaignos (red card) 88'	Report	Kramer 82'	Stadium: De Grolsch Veste; Attendance: 29,100; Referee: Kevin Blom

5 April 2014 31	NAC Breda	0 – 2	Twente	Breda
19:45 CEST (UTC+2)		Report	Marsman (yellow card) 24'; Gutiérrez 39'; Tadić 50'	Stadium: Rat Verlegh Stadion; Attendance: 18,800; Referee: Tom van Sichem

12 April 2014 32	Twente	3 – 0	Roda JC	Enschede
20:45 CEST (UTC+2)	Børven 11', 25'; Ebecilio 53'	Report		Stadium: De Grolsch Veste; Attendance: 29,600; Referee: Danny Makkelie

27 April 2014 33	NEC	2 – 5	Twente	Nijmegen
14:30 CEST (UTC+2)	Castillion 1'; Rieks (yellow card) 13'; Vermijl (yellow card) 41'; Marsman 79' (o.g.)	Report	Ebecilio 29'; Brama 55'; Tadić 57', 59'; Corona 76'	Stadium: Stadion de Goffert; Attendance: 12,400; Referee: Pol van Boekel

3 May 2014 34	Twente	2 – 2	PEC Zwolle	Enschede
18:45 CEST (UTC+2)	Ebecilio 21'; Tadić 28'; Rosales (yellow card) 77'	Report	Karagounis 27', (yellow card) 38'; Narsingh 71'	Stadium: De Grolsch Veste; Attendance: 29,800; Referee: Jochem Kamphuis

==== League table ====
Pos	Team	Pld	W	D	L	GF	GA	GD	Pts	Qualification or relegation
1	Ajax (C)	34	20	11	3	69	28	+41	71	Qualification for the Champions League group stage
2	Feyenoord	34	20	7	7	76	40	+36	67	Qualification for the Champions League third qualifying round
3	Twente	34	17	12	5	72	37	+35	63	Qualification for the Europa League play-off round
4	PSV	34	18	5	11	60	45	+15	59	Qualification for the Europa League third qualifying round
5	Heerenveen	34	16	9	9	72	51	+21	57	Qualification for the European competition play-offs

Source: Eredivisie
Rules for classification: 1) points; 2) goal difference; 3) number of goals scored
(C) Champions

=== KNVB Cup ===
26 September 2013 Second round	SC Heerenveen	3 – 0	Twente	Heerenveen
18:45 CEST	Slagveer 20'; Finnbogason 50', 63'	Report	Rosales (yellow card) 21' (yellow-red card) 24'	Stadium: Abe Lenstra Stadion; Attendance: 13,500; Referee: Pieter Vink

== Squad statistics ==
=== Appearances and goals ===
No.	Pos	Nat	Player	Total		Eredivisie		KNVB Cup	
No.	Pos	Nat	Player	Apps	Goals	Apps	Goals	Apps	Goals
2	DF	(Netherlands) NED	Dico Koppers	24	0	20+3	0	1	0
3	DF	(Denmark) DEN	Andreas Bjelland	34	0	33	0	1	0
4	DF	(Netherlands) NED	Peter Wisgerhof	1	0	0+1	0	0	0
5	DF	(Netherlands) NED	Robbert Schilder	17	0	14+2	0	0+1	0
6	MF	(Netherlands) NED	Wout Brama	5	1	2+3	1	0	0
7	FW	(Netherlands) NED	Youness Mokhtar	26	3	14+11	3	1	0
8	MF	(Netherlands) NED	Kyle Ebecilio	34	7	33	7	1	0
9	FW	(Montenegro) MNE	Luka Đorđević	15	0	1+13	0	1	0
10	FW	(Serbia) SRB	Dušan Tadić	34	16	33	16	1	0
11	MF	(Mexico) MEX	Jesús Corona	16	2	3+12	2	0+1	0
12	FW	(Germany) GER	Tim Hölscher	1	0	0+1	0	0	0
14	DF	(Germany) GER	Nils Röseler	2	0	0+2	0	0	0
15	DF	(Venezuela) VEN	Roberto Rosales	31	1	30	1	1	0
16	DF	(Netherlands) NED	Tim Breukers	5	0	2+3	0	0	0
17	DF	(Sweden) SWE	Rasmus Bengtsson	29	4	27+1	4	1	0
18	DF	(Curaçao) CUW	Cuco Martina	17	1	10+6	1	0+1	0
19	MF	(Ghana) GHA	Shadrach Eghan	25	5	17+7	5	1	0
21	MF	(Chile) CHI	Felipe Gutiérrez	34	3	33	3	1	0
22	GK	(Netherlands) NED	Nick Marsman	35	0	34	0	1	0
24	MF	(Netherlands) NED	Quincy Promes	31	11	31	11	0	0
25	MF	(Netherlands) NED	Bilal Ould-Chikh	1	0	0+1	0	0	0
27	MF	(Netherlands) NED	Dario Tanda	2	0	1+1	0	0	0
30	FW	(Netherlands) NED	Luc Castaignos	31	14	31	14	0	0
31	FW	(Norway) NOR	Torgeir Børven	12	3	3+9	3	0	0
Players away from the club on loan:
14	MF	(Netherlands) NED	Willem Janssen	2	0	1+1	0	0	0
26	FW	(Netherlands) NED	Felitciano Zschusschen	1	0	0+1	0	0	0
Players who appeared for Twente that left during the season:
28	FW	(Netherlands) NED	Joshua John	4	0	1+3	0	0	0

=== Goal scorers ===
Place	Position	Nation	Number	Name	Eredivisie	KNVB Cup	Total
1	FW	(Serbia)	10	Dušan Tadić	16	0	16
2	FW	(Netherlands)	30	Luc Castaignos	14	0	14
3	MF	(Netherlands)	24	Quincy Promes	11	0	11
4	MF	(Netherlands)	8	Kyle Ebecilio	7	0	7
5	MF	(Ghana)	19	Shadrach Eghan	5	0	5
6	DF	(Sweden)	17	Rasmus Bengtsson	4	0	4
7	MF	(Morocco)	7	Youness Mokhtar	3	0	3
7	MF	(Chile)	21	Felipe Gutiérrez	3	0	3
7	FW	(Norway)	31	Torgeir Børven	3	0	3
10	MF	(Mexico)	11	Jesús Corona	2	0	2
11	DF	(Venezuela)	15	Roberto Rosales	1	0	1
11	DF	(Curaçao)	18	Cuco Martina	1	0	1
11	MF	(Netherlands)	6	Wout Brama	1	0	1
11				Own goal	1	0	1
				TOTALS	72	0	72

=== Disciplinary record ===
Number	Nation	Position	Name	Eredivisie		KNVB Cup		Total	
Number	Nation	Position	Name	Yellow card	Red card	Yellow card	Red card	Yellow card	Red card
2	(Netherlands)	DF	Dico Koppers	5	0	0	0	5	0
3	(Denmark)	DF	Andreas Bjelland	3	0	0	0	3	0
5	(Netherlands)	DF	Robbert Schilder	3	0	0	0	3	0
7	(Morocco)	MF	Youness Mokhtar	2	0	0	0	2	0
8	(Netherlands)	MF	Kyle Ebecilio	3	0	0	0	3	0
9	(Montenegro)	FW	Luka Đorđević	2	0	1	0	3	0
10	(Serbia)	FW	Dušan Tadić	3	0	0	0	3	0
11	(Mexico)	MF	Jesús Corona	1	0	0	0	1	0
15	(Venezuela)	DF	Roberto Rosales	6	0	2	1	8	1
17	(Sweden)	DF	Rasmus Bengtsson	7	1	0	0	7	1
18	(Curaçao)	DF	Cuco Martina	1	0	0	0	1	0
19	(Ghana)	MF	Shadrach Eghan	3	0	0	0	3	0
21	(Chile)	MF	Felipe Gutiérrez	3	0	0	0	3	0
22	(Netherlands)	GK	Nick Marsman	2	0	0	0	2	0
24	(Netherlands)	MF	Quincy Promes	2	0	0	0	2	0
30	(Netherlands)	FW	Luc Castaignos	4	1	0	0	4	1
			TOTALS	50	2	3	1	53	3
