= Kyle Ebecilio =

Dutch footballer (born 1994)

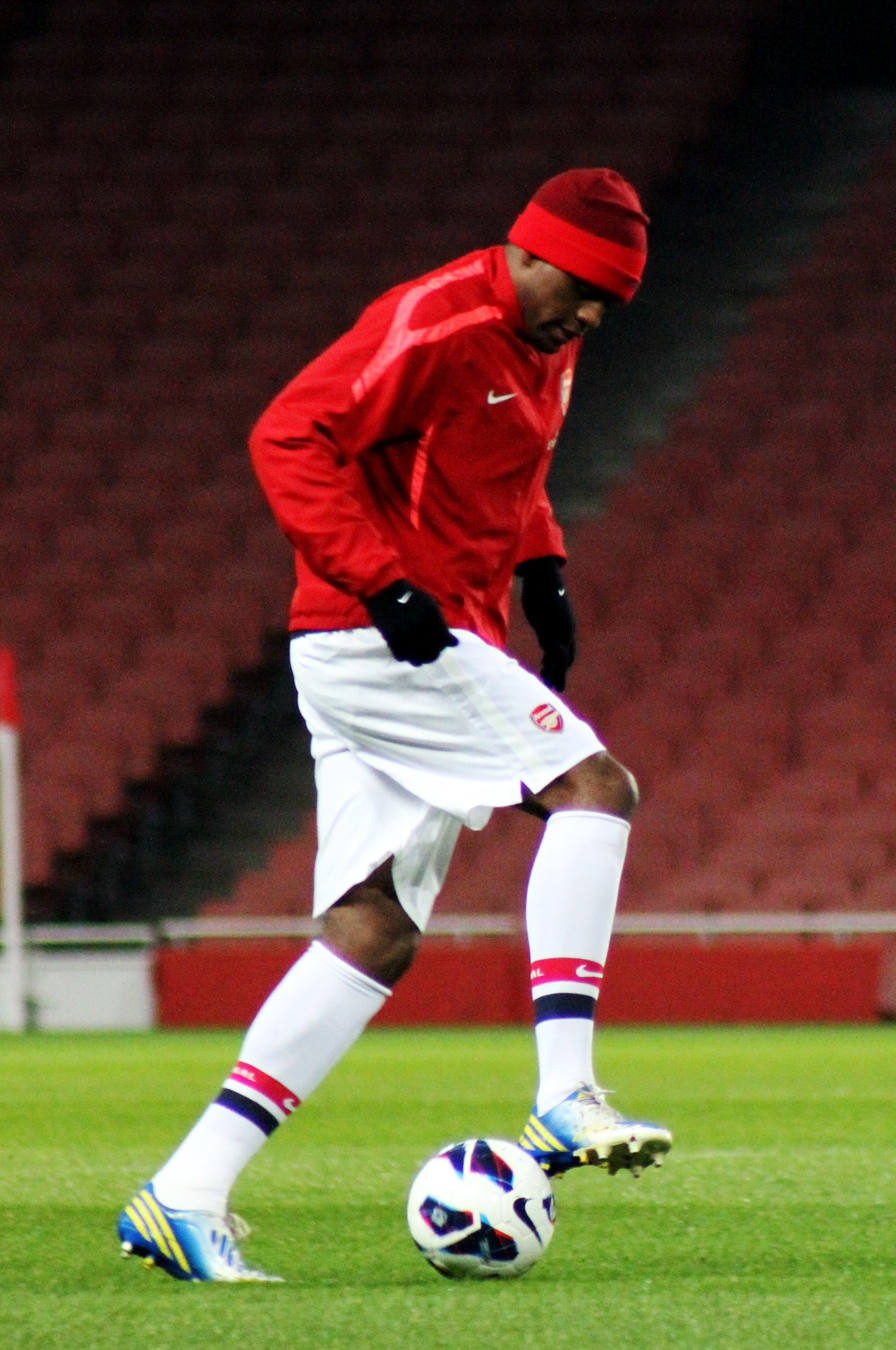
- Ebecilio training with Arsenal in 2012

Personal information
- Full name: Kyle Stephen Joel Ebecilio
- Date of birth: 17 February 1994 (age 32)
- Place of birth: Rotterdam, Netherlands
- Height: 1.82 m (6 ft 0 in)
- Position: Midfielder

Team information
- Current team: Kruisland
- Number: 24

Youth career
- 2001–2010: Feyenoord
- 2010–2013: Arsenal

Senior career*
Years	Team	Apps	(Gls)
2013–2017	Twente	60	(10)
2015–2016	→ Nottingham Forest (loan)	5	(0)
2016	→ ADO Den Haag (loan)	6	(0)
2016–2017	Jong Twente	9	(0)
2018–19	Jong ADO	7	(0)
2018–19	ADO Den Haag	1	(0)
2019–2020	Excelsior	6	(0)
2021	Alki Oroklini	9	(0)
2023–2024	Capelle		
2024–	Kruisland		

International career^{‡}
2009–2010	Netherlands U16	9	(2)
2010–2011	Netherlands U17	13	(5)
2011–2013	Netherlands U19	16	(4)
2013–2016	Netherlands U21	9	(0)
Medal record
Men's football
Representing Netherlands
UEFA European Under-17 Championship
Winner	2011 Serbia
- * Club domestic league appearances and goals as of 17:21, 17 February 2024 (UTC) ‡ National team caps and goals as of 16:58, 10 October 2014 (UTC)

Kyle Stephen Joel Ebecilio (born 17 February 1994) is a Dutch footballer who plays for Vierde Divisie club Kruisland. Ebecilio, who plays as a midfielder, has featured for Arsenal, Nottingham Forest as well as Eredivisie sides ADO Den Haag and FC Twente throughout his career.

== Club career ==
=== Arsenal ===
Born in Rotterdam, Netherlands, Ebecilio started his youth career at Feyenoord when he was seven. Ebecilio soon attracted interest from Premier League clubs and eventually joined Arsenal in 2010. In 2011, Ebecilio signed his first professional contract with the club. In November 2011, Ebecilio felt it was time for him to make his breakthrough at Arsenal. While at Arsenal, Ebecilio helped the club to reach to fourth place of the 2012–13 NextGen Series.

In May 2013, Ebecilio was offered a new contract with the club after years at the club's academy. Meanwhile, other clubs were interested in signing Ebecilio.

=== Twente ===
In May 2013, Ebecilio signed a five-year contract with FC Twente, returning to his homeland after three years in England.

Ebecilio made his professional debut on 3 August 2013, coming on as a substitute for Dario Tanda in the 60th minutes, in a 0–0 draw against RKC Waalwijk. Ebecilio scored his first professional goal in the next game, in a 4–1 win over Feyenoord. Later in his first season, having been ever-present in this season, Ebecilio scored six more goals against Heracles, NAC Breda, PSV Eindhoven, Roda JC Kerkrade, N.E.C. and PEC Zwolle.

In his second season at Twente, Ebecilio added two more goals against Utrecht on 28 September 2013 and AZ Alkmaar on 5 October 2014. In December 2014, Ebecilio clashed with Manager Alfred Schreuder resulting in him being left out of the squad for four matches. Ebecilio scored on his return, in a 2–1 win over Cambuur on 31 January 2015.

==== Nottingham Forest ====
On 20 August 2015, Ebecilio joined Championship side Nottingham Forest on a season-long loan. He made his debut in a 1–1 draw away at Bolton Wanderers on 22 August 2015. However, having made only five first-team appearances for the club due to injury, Ebecilio's loan deal at Nottingham was terminated on 31 January 2016; the last day of the English and Dutch winter transfer window. He was instantly loaned out to ADO Den Haag where he stayed for the remaining duration of that season.

==== Return to Twente ====
Ebecilio then returned to FC Twente in the summer of 2016. He was not featured by the Tukkers as a regular player for the first side. Ebecilio thus left the club in March 2017.

=== NEC ===
Ebecilio signed up with N.E.C in November 2017 where at first he sought to regain his fitness. Ebecilio was eventually added to the squad of Jong N.E.C. in late January 2018.

=== ADO Den Haag ===
In December 2018 Ebecilio moved back to ADO Den Haag to regain his fitness. His first game upon his return to the club was for Jong ADO when he came on in the 76th minute against Sparta Rotterdam, replacing midfielder Johnny Reynolds in a 2–1 win. He played seven further matches with Jong ADO in Beloften Eredivisie. On 21 April 2019 he was added to the selection of the first team who played against PSV Eindhoven but he stayed on the bench. He made his return to the first team as a late substitute for Danny Bakker in a 6–2 win against Willem II on 15 May 2019. It was his final appearance for the club.

=== Excelsior ===
In July 2019, he moved to Excelsior on a two-year contract, but left at the end of the 2019–20 season after only six appearances in the league.

=== Alki Oroklini ===
In January 2021, Ebecilio joined Cypriot Second Division club Alki Oroklini.

=== Capelle ===
In June 2023, after two years as a free agent, Ebecilio joined Vierde Divisie club Capelle.

== International career ==
Ebecilio has represented The Netherlands at various youth levels, from the under 16 to under 21 teams.

At the UEFA European Under-17 Championship in Serbia, Ebecilio scored three goals in the 2011 tournament which the Dutch won for the first time. He stood out earning the Golden Boot and Best Player awards.

== Personal life ==
Ebecilio grew up supporting Feyenoord and his cousins are fellow footballers Jeffrey Bruma and Marciano Bruma.

He is not the younger brother of Lorenzo Ebecilio. He is of Surinamese descent.

== Career statistics ==
As of match played 8 May 2016

Club	Season	League			Cup		League Cup		Europe		Total	
Club	Season	Division	Apps	Goals	Apps	Goals	Apps	Goals	Apps	Goals	Apps	Goals
FC Twente	2013–14	Eredivisie	34	7	1	0	—		—		35	7
FC Twente	2014–15	Eredivisie	26	3	3	0	—		2	0	31	3
FC Twente	Total		60	10	4	0	—		2	0	66	10
Nottingham Forest (loan)	2015–16	Championship	5	0	0	0	0	0	—		5	0
ADO Den Haag (loan)	2015–16	Eredivisie	6	0	0	0	0	0	—		6	0
FC Twente	2016–17	Eredivisie	0	0	0	0	0	0	—		0	0
ADO Den Haag	2018–19	Eredivisie	1	0	0	0	0	0	—		1	0
Excelsior	2019–20	Eerste Divisie	6	0	0	0	0	0	—		6	0
Alki Oroklini	2020–21	Cypriot Second Division	9	0	0	0	0	0	—		9	0
Career total			87	10	4	0	0	0	2	0	93	10

== Honours ==
=== Club ===
Arsenal

- NextGen Series: fourth 2012–13

=== International ===
Netherlands

- UEFA European Under-17 Championship: 2011

=== Individual ===
- 2011 UEFA European Under-17 Championship
  - Top Scorer
  - Best Player
