= Rasmus Bengtsson =

Swedish footballer (born 1986)

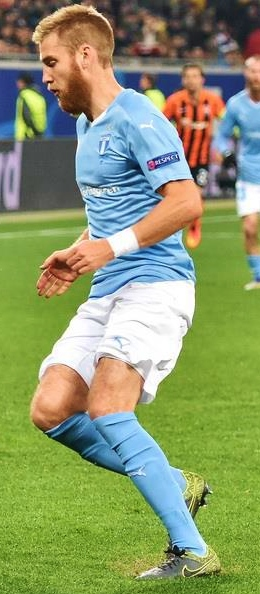

Personal information
- Full name: Rasmus Mattias Bengtsson
- Date of birth: 26 June 1986 (age 40)
- Place of birth: Malmö, Sweden
- Height: 1.85 m (6 ft 1 in)
- Position: Centre-back

Youth career
- –2006: Malmö FF

Senior career*
Years	Team	Apps	(Gls)
2006–2009	Trelleborgs FF	73	(10)
2009–2010	Hertha BSC	6	(0)
2009–2010	→ Hertha BSC II	4	(0)
2010–2015	Twente	93	(7)
2015–2021	Malmö FF	80	(4)
Total		256	(21)

International career
2008–2009	Sweden U21	13	(0)
2009–2014	Sweden	4	(0)
- * Club domestic league appearances and goals

Rasmus Mattias Bengtsson (born 26 June 1986) is a Swedish former professional footballer who played as a centre back. Starting off his professional career with Trelleborgs FF in 2006, he went on to represent Hertha BSC in the German Bundesliga and Twente in the Dutch Eredivise before retiring at his boyhood club Malmö FF in 2021. A full international between 2009 and 2014, he won four caps for the Sweden national team.

== Career ==
=== Early career ===
Bengtsson started his career in his home town club Malmö FF. He transferred to Superettan side Trelleborgs FF in 2006 after having failed to make into the first team at Malmö FF. Bengtsson made his professional debut for Trelleborg in 2006. During his time in Trelleborg Bengtsson also changed his preferred position from striker to central defender. With Trelleborg he won the Superettan title of 2006 as the club were promoted to the first tier of Sweden, Allsvenskan. Bengtsson played a further three seasons in Allsvenskan with the club before he departed for German side Hertha BSC in the summer of 2009.

=== Hertha BSC ===
In August 2009, Bengtsson transferred to Hertha BSC on a three-year contract. Prior to signing with Hertha, it was claimed that he was close to signing with Italian club S.S. Lazio. Bengtsson later declared he had no interest in signing for Lazio. When Bengtsson signed for Berlin it upset the Italian club, who claimed that he had already signed with them. Lazio took their case to FIFA. Bengtsson only spent one season at the German side as they were relegated from the Bundesliga at the end of the 2009–10 season.

=== Twente ===
Bengtsson signed with Dutch Eredivisie side FC Twente on 9 July 2010. He gained a more important role in the Twente defence in the 2012–13 season after having played more sporadically during his first two seasons at the club. Bengtsson was chosen as Twente's club captain in July 2013 ahead of the 2013–14 season. During his time at Twente, Bengtsson has also played in the UEFA Europa League and the UEFA Champions League.

=== Malmö FF ===
Bengtsson returned to his youth club Malmö FF on 25 March 2015. He signed a five-year contract lasting until the end of the 2019 season.

After the end of the 2020 season, Malmö FF and Bengtsson parted ways. On April 13, 2021, Bengtsson announced via Swedish newspaper Expressen that he had retired. He won three Allsvenskan titles with the club and played in the 2015–16 UEFA Champions League.

== International career ==
During the 2009 UEFA European Under-21 Football Championship in Sweden, Bengtsson played all Sweden's four matches from start together with Mattias Bjärsmyr. His first cap for the Swedish senior national team came in a friendly against Mexico in January 2009.

== Career statistics ==
=== Club ===
Club	Season		League		Cup		Continental		Total	
Club	Season	Division	Apps	Goals	Apps	Goals	Apps	Goals	Apps	Goals
Trelleborgs FF	2006	Superettan	19	2	—		—		19	2
Trelleborgs FF	2007	Allsvenskan	14	3	—		—		14	3
Trelleborgs FF	2008	Allsvenskan	28	4	—		—		28	4
Trelleborgs FF	2009	Allsvenskan	12	1	—		—		12	1
Trelleborgs FF	Total		73	10	0	0	0	0	73	10
Hertha BSC	2009–10	Bundesliga	6	0	1	0	2	0	9	0
Hertha BSC	Total		6	0	1	0	2	0	9	0
Hertha BSC II	2009–10	Regionalliga	4	0	—		—		4	0
Hertha BSC II	Total		4	0	0	0	0	0	4	0
FC Twente	2010–11	Eredivisie	10	0	4	0	2	0	16	0
FC Twente	2011–12	Eredivisie	13	0	1	0	4	0	18	0
FC Twente	2012–13	Eredivisie	25	2	1	0	5	1	31	3
FC Twente	2013–14	Eredivisie	28	4	1	0	—		29	4
FC Twente	2014–15	Eredivisie	17	1	2	0	1	0	20	1
FC Twente	Total		93	7	9	0	12	1	114	8
Malmö FF	2015	Allsvenskan	16	1	1	0	10	0	27	1
Malmö FF	2016	Allsvenskan	18	2	4	1	—		22	3
Malmö FF	2017	Allsvenskan	9	0	0	0	1	0	10	0
Malmö FF	2018	Allsvenskan	13	0	5	1	13	0	31	1
Malmö FF	2019	Allsvenskan	23	1	2	0	12	4	37	5
Malmö FF	2020	Allsvenskan	1	0	1	0	2	0	4	0
Malmö FF	Total		80	4	13	2	38	4	131	10
Career total			256	21	23	2	52	5	331	28

=== International ===
Appearances and goals per year

National team	Year	Apps	Goals
Sweden	2009	1	0
Sweden	2013	1	0
Sweden	2014	2	0
Total		4	0

== Honours ==
Trelleborgs FF

- Superettan: 2006

Twente

- KNVB Cup: 2010–11
- Johan Cruijff Shield: 2010, 2011

Malmö FF

- Allsvenskan: 2016, 2017, 2020
