= 2010 Johan Cruyff Shield =

Johan Cruijff Schaal XV
Ajax	FC Twente
0	1
- Date: 31 July 2010
- Venue: Amsterdam Arena, Amsterdam
- Referee: Kevin Blom
- Attendance: 25,000

The fifteenth edition of the Johan Cruyff Shield (Dutch: Johan Cruijff Schaal) was held on 31 July 2010 at the Amsterdam Arena. The match was played between the 2009–10 Eredivisie champions FC Twente and 2009–10 KNVB Cup winners Ajax. FC Twente won the match 1–0 with a goal from Luuk de Jong.

== Match details ==
31 July 2010

Ajax	0–1	FC Twente
	Report	L. de Jong 8'

Amsterdam Arena, Amsterdam
Attendance: 25,000
Referee: Kevin Blom

Ajax	FC Twente

GK	1	(Netherlands) Maarten Stekelenburg
RB	2	(Netherlands) Gregory van der Wiel
CB	3	(Belgium) Toby Alderweireld
CB	23	(Spain) Oleguer
LB	5	(Netherlands) Vurnon Anita	(yellow card) 89'
CM	20	(Netherlands) Demy de Zeeuw
CM	10	(Netherlands) Siem de Jong
CM	6	(Cameroon) Eyong Enoh		(substituted off) 5'
RW	16	(Uruguay) Luis Suárez (c)	(yellow card) 10' (red card) 43'
CF	21	(South Korea) Suk Hyun-jun		(substituted off) 46'
LW	8	(Denmark) Christian Eriksen
Substitutes:
GK	30	(Netherlands) Jeroen Verhoeven
DF	17	(Netherlands) Daley Blind
MF	18	(Sweden) Rasmus Lindgren		(substituted on) 5' (substituted off) 72'
MF	24	(Netherlands) Marvin Zeegelaar
MF	11	(Netherlands) Urby Emanuelson		(substituted on) 46'
FW	7	(Serbia) Miralem Sulejmani		(substituted on) 72'
FW	9	(Morocco) Mounir El Hamdaoui
Manager:
(Netherlands) Martin Jol

GK	13	(Bulgaria) Nikolay Mihaylov
RB	33	(Netherlands) Dwight Tiendalli
CB	4	(Netherlands) Peter Wisgerhof (c)
CB	19	(Brazil) Douglas		(substituted off) 87'
LB	2	(Australia) David Carney
CM	6	(Netherlands) Wout Brama
CM	18	(Ivory Coast) Cheick Tioté	(yellow card) 88'
CM	8	(Netherlands) Theo Janssen
RW	10	(Costa Rica) Bryan Ruiz
CF	9	(Netherlands) Luuk de Jong	(yellow card) 54'
LW	11	(Sweden) Emir Bajrami	(yellow card) 78'	(substituted off) 81'
Substitutes:
GK	30	(Netherlands) Nick Marsman
DF	5	(Sweden) Rasmus Bengtsson
DF	37	(Netherlands) Mitch Stockentree
MF	17	(Netherlands) Alexander Bannink		(substituted on) 87'
FW	14	(South Africa) Bernard Parker		(substituted on) 81'
FW	20	(Netherlands) Steven Berghuis
FW	7	(Azerbaijan) Vagif Javadov
Manager:
(Belgium) Michel Preud'homme
