= Samed Yeşil =

German footballer (born 1994)

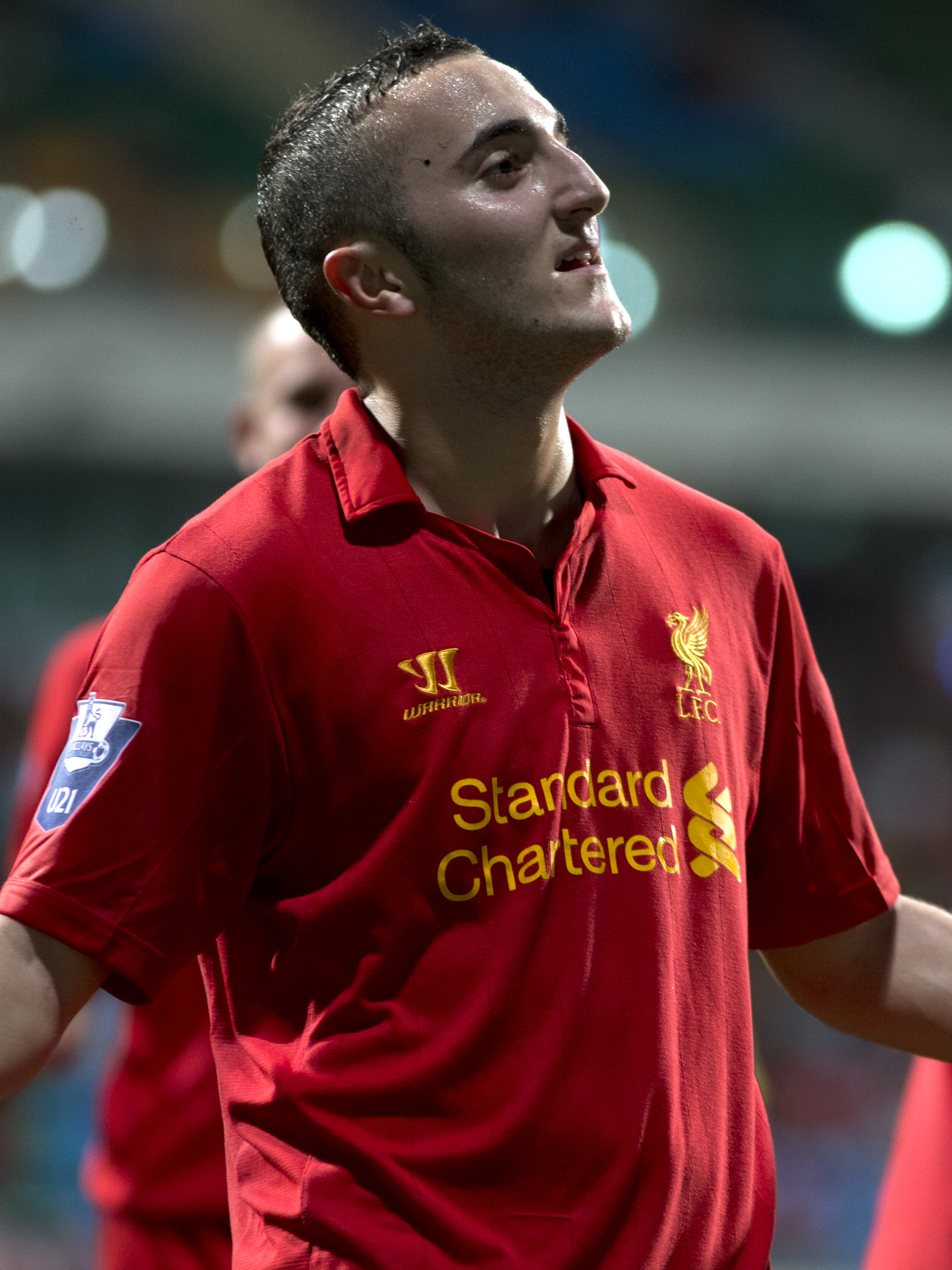
- Yeşil playing for Liverpool U19 in 2012

Personal information
- Full name: Samed Yeşil
- Date of birth: 25 May 1994 (age 32)
- Place of birth: Düsseldorf, Germany
- Height: 1.80 m (5 ft 11 in)
- Position: Striker

Team information
- Current team: CSV Marathon Krefeld

Youth career
- 2000–2002: Düsseldorfer CfR links
- 2002–2005: BV 04 Düsseldorf
- 2005–2012: Bayer Leverkusen

Senior career*
Years	Team	Apps	(Gls)
2012	Bayer Leverkusen II	4	(0)
2012	Bayer Leverkusen	1	(0)
2012–2016	Liverpool	0	(0)
2015–2016	→ Luzern (loan)	14	(1)
2017–2018	Panionios	33	(4)
2018–2019	KFC Uerdingen 05	2	(0)
2020	Ankara Demirspor	5	(0)
2020–2021	VfB Homberg	22	(2)
2021–2022	SC St. Tönis 11/20	22	(9)
2022–2023	Ratingen 04/19	30	(4)
2023–2024	CSV Marathon	27	(44)
2024–2025	ATS Krefeld	24	(96)
2025–2026	Türkgücü Ratingen	13	(20)
2026	ATS Krefeld	13	(26)
2026-	CSV Marathon	13	(22)

International career
2010	Germany U16	2	(3)
2010–2011	Germany U17	21	(20)
2012	Germany U18	3	(0)
2012–2013	Germany U19	7	(8)
Medal record
Men's football
Representing Germany
European Under-17 Championship
Runner-up	2011
FIFA U-17 World Cup
Bronze medal – third place	2011
- * Club domestic league appearances and goals as of 12 November 2022

Samed Yeşil (Turkish pronunciation: [samed jeʃil], born 25 May 1994) is a German footballer who plays as a striker for CSV Marathon.

Formed at Bayer Leverkusen, he moved as a teenager to Liverpool in 2012. In 2015, he was loaned to FC Luzern.

Yeşil has represented Germany up to under-19 level. He was particularly successful in their under-17 team, whom he helped become runners-up in the European Championship and third place at the World Cup in 2011, finishing as top scorer of the former and second top at the latter.

== Club career ==
=== Early career ===
Yeşil was born in Düsseldorf, but grew up in Krefeld. He started playing football in local club CFR Links, aged just six and then he played for BV 04 Düsseldorf. Aged eleven he was offered trial at Bayer 04 Leverkusen, which he accepted. In 2010, he reached the final of German Junior championship, which his team lost 1–0 to Eintracht Frankfurt. Next season he scored 22 goals in 24 matches for B-Junioren (U17/U16) and was moved one level up.

Yeşil scored 57 goals in 71 matches in the Bayer Leverkusen youth teams between 2010 and 2012. Yeşil made five appearances for the Leverkusen first team in his breakthrough year of 2012–13.

=== Liverpool ===
Liverpool signed Yeşil for a price believed to be £1 million on 30 August 2012 after attracting the attention of manager Brendan Rodgers, who moved quickly to secure the 18-year-old's signature.

Yeşil's first game for Liverpool was in an Under-21 match against Chelsea, with the Reds winning 4–1. He shortly after got his first call-up to the senior squad after that, remaining an unused substitute in a 5–3 UEFA Europa League group stage win away to BSC Young Boys of Switzerland on 20 September. Six days later, Yesil made his senior debut in the Football League Cup third-round game against West Bromwich Albion, starting in a 2–1 win at The Hawthorns. He also appeared in the next round against Swansea City, in which Liverpool succumbed to a 3–1 home defeat.

On 7 December 2012, after coming back from injury, Yeşil scored his first goal in a Liverpool shirt with a half-volley lob over the goalkeeper to put Liverpool 3–1 up in a 4–1 win over Crystal Palace at The Academy in the U21 Professional Development League, after coming off the bench as a substitute. In February of the following year, after rupturing his anterior cruciate ligament on international duty with Germany U19, he was sidelined for rest of the season.

On 7 October 2013, Yeşil made his comeback as a substitute in a 5–0 win against Tottenham Hotspur in the U21 Premier League. He then again ruptured his anterior cruciate ligament in training and was out of the season. Yeşil made his return from injury coming on as a substitute on 19 August 2014 in a U21 Premier League game against Sunderland. On 12 September, he scored his first goal since his return from injury in a 4–0 win over West Ham. After suffering further injury setbacks, he made his first start in 6 months against Tottenham Hotspur at White Hart Lane on 17 April 2015, scoring twice as Liverpool U21s won 3–1.

On 31 August 2015, Yeşil joined Luzern on a season-long deal. He made his non-competitive debut for the club against 1. FC Kaiserslautern on 4 September, scoring twice in three minutes as a second-half substitute in a 5–1 win. His Swiss Super League debut came nine days later, against Grasshopper Club Zürich, replacing Marco Schneuwly for the final fifteen minutes of a 3–3 draw. On 27 September, he scored his first senior goal, the game's only in a win over FC Zürich at the Swissporarena.

On 10 June 2016, he was released from Liverpool at the end of his contract.

=== Panionios ===
On 15 January 2017, Yeşil joined Panionios on a two-and-a-half-year contract for an undisclosed fee. He made his debut for the club in a 2–0 away win against Panetolikos. On 17 May 2017, thanks to a close-range effort by the German striker, Panionios won 1–0 against AEK Athens at the Olympic Stadium of Athens, in the 2016–17 Play Offs.

On 14 July 2017, Panionios returned to UEFA Europa League after nine years of absence with a 2–0 home win over Slovenia’s Gorica at the first leg of the second qualifying round of the Europa League. Yesil scored a goal in each half to give Panionios a victory at Nea Smyrni Stadium, on the debut of manager Michalis Grigoriou. On the second leg of the second qualifying round of the Europa League, Yesil scored another goal, his third in this round restored lead from close range following Kapić penalty in a 3–2 away win. On 24 September 2017, he scored his first league goal for the season in a 4–1 win against AEL. On 25 October 2017, he scored in the 93rd minute with a backheel in a 2–1 away win against Aris for the Greek Cup.

=== KFC Uerdingen 05 ===
On 3 September 2018, Yeşil returned to Germany joining KFC Uerdingen 05 after not signing a new contract with Panionios. He left the club on 1 July 2019 after the expiry of his contract having played just 10 minutes of first team football in his two appearances for the club. After failing to find a new club in the summer transfer window, he trained with German 5th division club TSV Meerbusch in order to maintain his fitness.

=== Ankara Demirspor ===
On 26 December 2019, Yeşil signed for Turkish third division club Ankara Demirspor on a free transfer.

=== FC Homburg ===
Yeşil moved to Regionalliga West side VfB Homberg in October 2020.

In August 2023, he was playing for Kreisliga A side CSV Marathon. After a great start to the season with Marathon where he had scored 28 goals by April 2024, it was announced he would be joining ATS Krefeld for the following season. He finished his spell with Marathon with 44 goals in 27 games.

=== ATS Krefeld ===
In 2024-25 season he scored 95 league goals for ATS.

== International career ==
Yeşil is Turkish-German. He has played for the German U-19 team. He is eligible to play for both the German and Turkish national teams at senior level. Until now, he has not decided for which national team he is going to play for. According to Turkish media, his former teammate Nuri Şahin who is also Turkish-German and a Turkish international, tried to convince him to choose the Turkish national team. Turkish national team head coach Fatih Terim wanted him to play for Turkey.

== Career statistics ==
As of end of 2017–18 season

Appearances and goals by club, season and competition
Club	Season	League			National Cup		League Cup		Europe		Total	
Club	Season	Division	Apps	Goals	Apps	Goals	Apps	Goals	Apps	Goals	Apps	Goals
Bayer Leverkusen	2011–12	Bundesliga	1	0	0	0	0	0	—		1	0
Liverpool	2012–13	Premier League	0	0	0	0	2	0	0	0	2	0
Luzern (loan)	2015–16	Swiss Super League	14	1	2	0	0	0	0	0	16	1
Panionios	2016–17	Super League Greece	13	1	0	0	0	0	0	0	13	1
Panionios	2017–18	Super League Greece	20	3	7	2	0	0	4	3	31	8
Panionios	Total		33	4	7	2	0	0	4	3	44	9
Career total			48	5	9	2	2	0	4	3	63	10

== Honours ==
Germany U17

- UEFA European Under-17 Football Championship: Runners-up (2011)
- FIFA U-17 World Cup: third place (2011)

Individual

- UEFA European Under-17 Championship top scorer: 2011
- FIFA U-17 World Cup Silver Shoe: 2011
