= Nick Marsman =

Dutch footballer (born 1990)

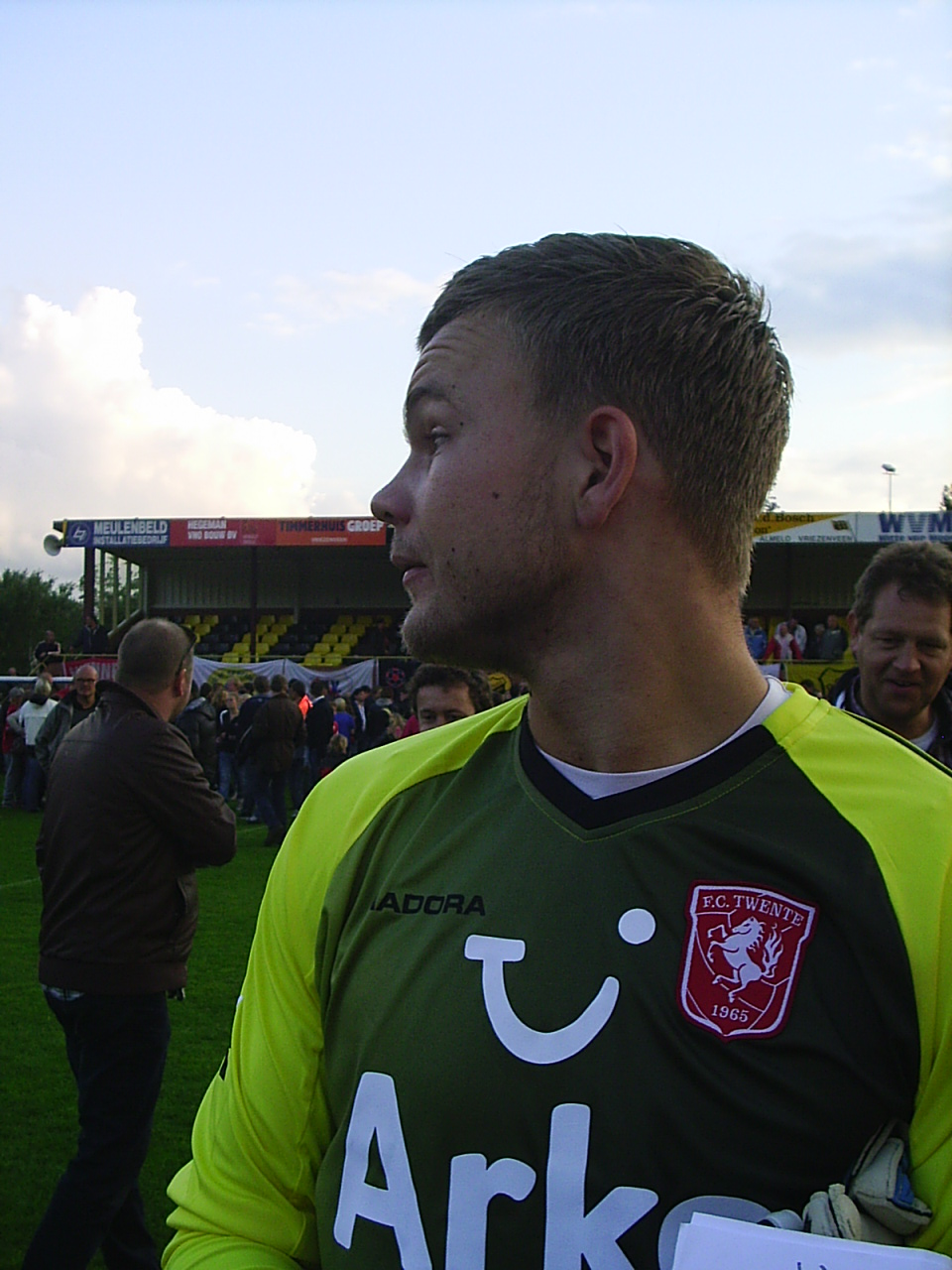
- Marsman playing for FC Twente in 2011

Personal information
- Date of birth: 1 October 1990 (age 36)
- Place of birth: Zwolle, Netherlands
- Height: 1.88 m (6 ft 2 in)
- Position: Goalkeeper

Team information
- Current team: Go Ahead Eagles
- Number: 22

Youth career
- –2003: Rohda Raalte
- 2003–2011: Twente

Senior career*
Years	Team	Apps	(Gls)
2011–2017	Twente	113	(0)
2012–2013	→ Go Ahead Eagles (loan)	32	(0)
2015	Jong Twente	2	(0)
2017–2019	Utrecht	3	(0)
2017–2018	Jong Utrecht	7	(0)
2019–2021	Feyenoord	23	(0)
2021–2023	Inter Miami	29	(0)
2022–2023	Inter Miami II	3	(0)
2023	MLS Pool	–	(–)
2023	→ San Antonio (loan)	7	(0)
2024	ADO Den Haag	17	(0)
2024	Roda JC	6	(0)
2025–2026	Renofa Yamaguchi	30	(0)
2026	Fortuna Sittard	0	(0)
2026–	Go Ahead Eagles	0	(0)

International career
2012	Netherlands U21		
- * Club domestic league appearances and goals as of 17 May 2026

Nick Marsman (born 1 October 1990) is a Dutch professional footballer who plays as a goalkeeper for Eredivisie club Go Ahead Eagles.

Born in Zwolle, Marsman progressed through the Twente academy and made his professional debut in 2011. After a loan spell at Go Ahead Eagles, he became Twente's first-choice goalkeeper before moving to Utrecht in 2017. He joined Feyenoord in 2019, serving as backup to Justin Bijlow. In 2021, he moved to MLS with Inter Miami and later joined USL side San Antonio FC on loan. Marsman returned to the Netherlands in 2024, signing with ADO Den Haag before joining Roda JC later that year.

== Club career ==
=== Early career ===
Born in Zwolle, Marsman was scouted by the Twente academy from the youth team of Rohda Raalte in 2003 and progressed through the academy ranks up to the under-19 team. During the 2006–07 season, he played as an under-17 player in the main under-19 team that won the Under 19 Eredivisie. The following year, he also won the Under 19 Supercup and Otten Cup with the team. In 2009, he moved to Jong Twente and occasionally appeared on the bench for the first team, including during their Johan Cruyff Shield victory in 2010. He signed his first professional contract with Twente in December 2010, committing until 2014.

=== Twente ===
In May 2011, Marsman was promoted to Twente's first team, assuming the role of third goalkeeper behind Nikolay Mihaylov and Sander Boschker following Wilko de Vogt's departure. Marsman made his professional debut on 21 September 2011, in a KNVB Cup away match against VV Zwaluwen, stepping in due to injuries to Mihaylov and Boschker. He made his Eredivisie debut on 15 October in an away match against RKC Waalwijk, where he kept a clean sheet. During the 2011–12 season, he made four competitive appearances.

For the 2012–13 season, Marsman was sent on loan to Eerste Divisie club Go Ahead Eagles, where he played 32 league matches under head coach Erik ten Hag, and helped the club secure promotion to the Eredivisie through the play-offs.

Marsman returned to Twente for the 2013–14 season and became the first-choice goalkeeper following Mihaylov's departure. Midway through the 2014–15 season, he lost his starting position to Sonny Stevens, who had joined from Volendam, but reclaimed it after Stevens sustained an injury. During the 2015–16 season, he again lost his starting position, this time to Joël Drommel, before regaining it in December. His contract with Twente, set to expire in the summer of 2017, was not renewed.

=== Utrecht ===
In June 2017, Marsman signed a one-year contract with Utrecht. He made his league debut on 17 December 2017, in a 1–1 draw against Heracles Almelo, stepping in for first-choice goalkeeper David Jensen, who was on leave due to the birth of his child. He also made seven league appearances for reserve team Jong Utrecht in the Eerste Divisie during that period.

=== Feyenoord ===
On 20 June 2019, Feyenoord announced that they had reached a principal agreement for a two-year contract with Marsman. On 1 December 2019, Marsman made his first Eredivisie appearance for Feyenoord in a 1–0 victory against PEC Zwolle, during which he kept a clean sheet. He was named Man of the Match by the club. Initially, Marsman served as the third-choice goalkeeper behind Kenneth Vermeer and Justin Bijlow, but he featured in several Eredivisie and UEFA Europa League matches due to injuries. In the second half of the season, he was promoted to second-choice goalkeeper following Vermeer's departure. The season, however, was abruptly interrupted by the COVID-19 pandemic. During the 2020–21 season, Marsman continued as the second-choice goalkeeper behind Bijlow. He stepped into the starting role for multiple matches due to a long-term injury to Bijlow.

=== MLS ===
In April 2021 it was announced that he would sign for MLS side Inter Miami CF in July. On 4 August 2023, Miami exercised a contract buyout on Marsman, making him a free agent.

In September 2023, Marsman joined USL Championship side San Antonio on loan from Major League Soccer as an MLS Pool goalkeeper. Three days later, he made his debut for San Antonio in a 3–3 draw with Tampa Bay Rowdies.

=== Return to the Netherlands ===
On 10 January 2024, Marsman returned to the Netherlands with ADO Den Haag on a contract until the end of the season. He immediately became ADO's starter under head coach Darije Kalezić, starting in a 2–1 cup round of 16 victory against Excelsior Maassluis, where he conceded within a minute of play. Marsman retained his starting role ahead of Tim Coremans for the remainder of the season. ADO reached the semi-finals of the promotion play-offs but were eliminated by Excelsior with a 9–2 aggregate loss. On 3 June 2024, ADO Den Haag announced that Nick Marsman's contract would not be extended, making him a free agent.

On 26 September 2024, Marsman signed a short-term contract with Eerste Divisie club Roda JC. He made his debut on 30 October in a surprising 3–1 cup defeat to amateur club Rijnsburgse Boys. Initially a backup to starting goalkeeper Justin Treichel, Marsman made his league debut on 22 November in a 3–1 victory over Jong Utrecht after Treichel had sustained an injury. He continued as the starting goalkeeper during Treichel's absence, while reportedly negotiating a transfer to Japanese club Renofa Yamaguchi.

=== Renofa Yamaguchi ===
On 23 December 2024, Marsman announced a transfer to J2 League club Renofa Yamaguchi from the 2025 season.

=== Fortuna Sittard ===
In February 2026, Marsman returned to the Netherlands to sign for Eredivisie club Fortuna Sittard on a contract until the end of the 2025–26 season, with an option for a further year. He was recruited following an injury to starting goalkeeper Mattijs Branderhorst and was set to compete with Luuk Koopmans and Niels Martens. He had been without a club since 1 January 2026 after leaving Renofa Yamaguchi, having trained with Willem II in the interim.

=== Return to Go Ahead Eagles ===
On 22 June 2026, Marsman returned to Go Ahead Eagles for one season.

== International career ==
Marsman represented Netherlands national under-21 team at the 2012 Toulon Tournament.

== Career statistics ==
As of match played 29 November 2025

Appearances and goals by club, season and competition
Club	Season	League			National cup		Other		Total	
Club	Season	Division	Apps	Goals	Apps	Goals	Apps	Goals	Apps	Goals
Twente	2011–12	Eredivisie	1	0	2	0	1 (Note: Appearance(s) in UEFA Europa League)	0	4	0
Twente	2012–13	Eredivisie	0	0	0	0	—		0	0
Twente	2013–14	Eredivisie	34	0	1	0	—		35	0
Twente	2014–15	Eredivisie	21	0	1	0	2	0	24	0
Twente	2015–16	Eredivisie	23	0	0	0	—		23	0
Twente	2016–17	Eredivisie	34	0	1	0	—		35	0
Twente	Total		113	0	5	0	3	0	121	0
Go Ahead Eagles (loan)	2012–13	Eerste Divisie	32	0	3	0	6 (Note: Appearance(s) in Promotion Playoffs)	0	42	0
Jong Twente	2014–15	Eerste Divisie	2	0	—		—		2	0
Jong Utrecht	2017–18	Eerste Divisie	7	0	—		—		7	0
Utrecht	2017–18	Eredivisie	1	0	0	0	0	0	1	0
Utrecht	2018–19	Eredivisie	2	0	0	0	—		2	0
Utrecht	Total		3	0	0	0	0	0	3	0
Feyenoord	2019–20	Eredivisie	2	0	0	0	2	0	4	0
Feyenoord	2020–21	Eredivisie	21	0	2	0	3	0	26	0
Feyenoord	Total		23	0	2	0	5	0	30	0
Inter Miami	2021	Major League Soccer	22	0	0	0	—		22	0
Inter Miami	2022	Major League Soccer	7	0	0	0	—		7	0
Inter Miami	2023	Major League Soccer	0	0	1	0	—		1	0
Inter Miami	Total		29	0	1	0	0	0	30	0
Inter Miami II	2022	MLS Next Pro	3	0	—		—		3	0
San Antonio (loan from MLS Pool)	2023	USL Championship	7	0	0	0	—		7	0
ADO Den Haag	2023–24	Eerste Divisie	17	0	2	0	4	0	23	0
Roda JC	2024–25	Eerste Divisie	6	0	1	0	—		7	0
Renofa Yamaguchi	2025	J2 League	30	0	0	0	—		30	0
Fortuna Sittard	2025–26	Eredivisie	0	0	0	0	—		0	0
Career total			272	0	15	0	18	0	305	0

== Honours ==
Twente

- Johan Cruijff Schaal: 2010
