= Mitch Stockentree =

Dutch footballer

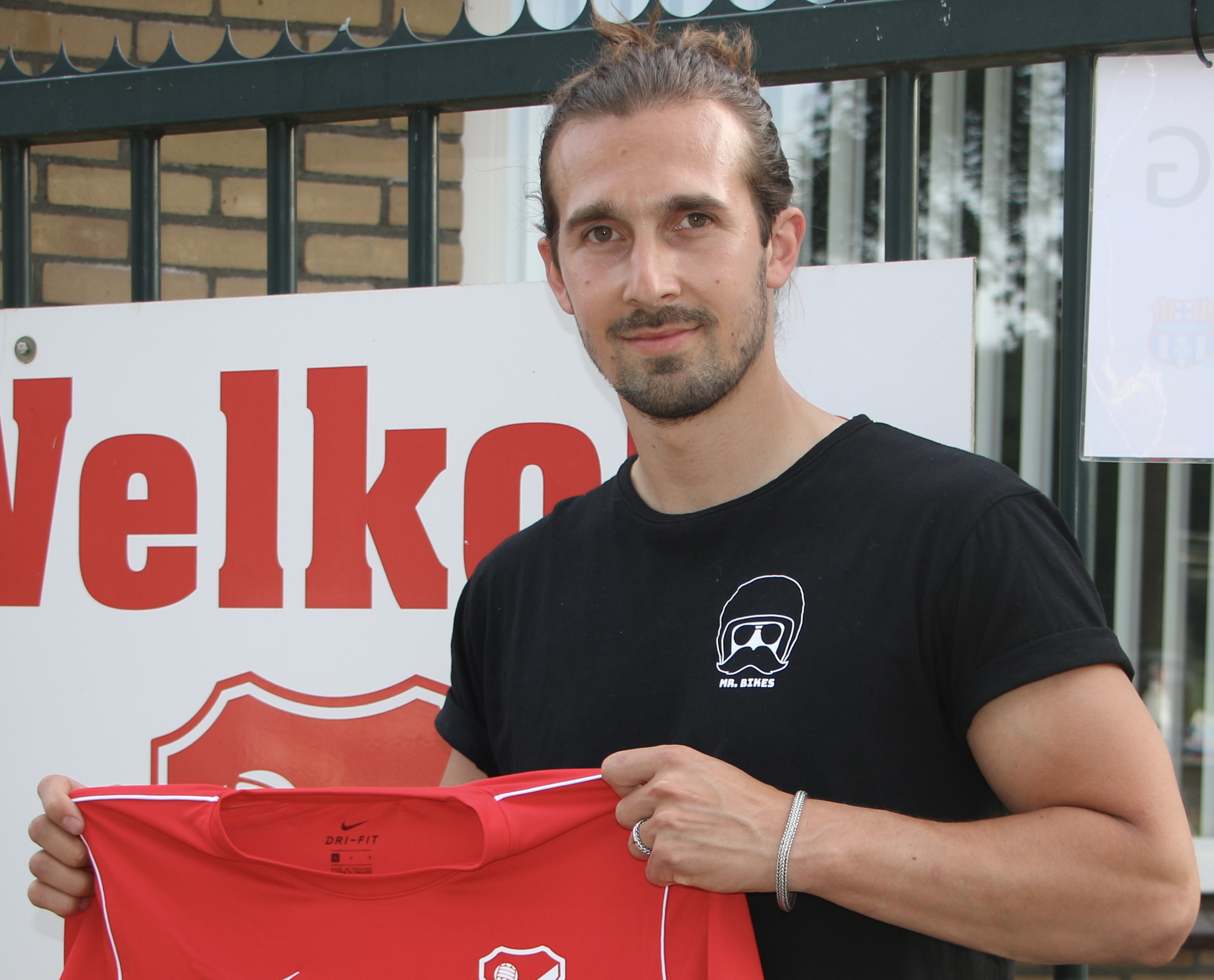

Personal information
- Date of birth: 22 January 1991 (age 35)
- Place of birth: Enschede, Netherlands
- Height: 1.83 m (6 ft 0 in)
- Position: Right-back

Youth career
- Enschedese Boys
- FC Twente VA

Senior career*
Years	Team	Apps	(Gls)
2010–2012	FC Twente	0	(0)
2012–2013	FC Oss	8	(0)
2013–2015	Eintracht Nordhorn		
2015	TVE Nordhorn		
2016–2017	Excelsior '31		
- * Club domestic league appearances and goals

Mitch Stockentree (born 22 January 1991) is a Dutch former professional footballer who played as a right-back.

== Career ==
Stockentree made his debut for FC Twente in a UEFA Champions League match on 10 November 2010 against Werder Bremen. He only played one more match for Twente in the KNVB Beker. After two seasons, he signed a two-year deal with FC Oss in the summer of 2012.

== Honours ==
Twente

- Johan Cruijff Schaal: 2010
