= Dico Koppers =

Dutch footballer

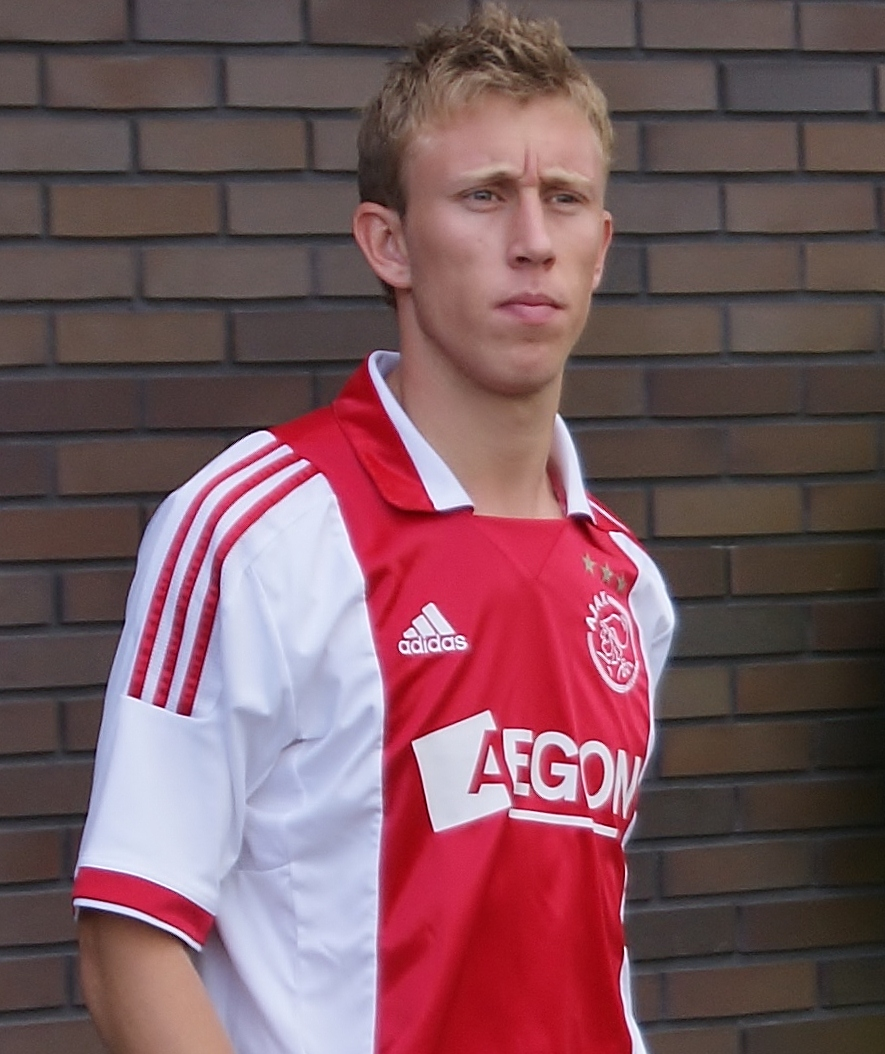
- Koppers with Ajax in October 2011

Personal information
- Date of birth: 31 January 1992 (age 34)
- Place of birth: Harmelen, Netherlands
- Height: 1.79 m (5 ft 10 in)
- Position: Left back

Team information
- Current team: Sportlust '46
- Number: 4

Youth career
- –2003: SCH'44
- 2003–2011: Ajax

Senior career*
Years	Team	Apps	(Gls)
2011–2013	Ajax	8	(0)
2013	→ ADO Den Haag (loan)	14	(0)
2013–2015	Twente	32	
2013–2015	→ Jong FC Twente	13	(0)
2015–2017	Willem II	40	(2)
2017–2019	PEC Zwolle	2	(0)
2019–2020	Almere City	7	(0)
2020–2023	Ajax Amateurs	26	(1)
2023–	Sportlust '46	13	(0)

International career
2006–2007	Netherlands U15	5	(0)
2008	Netherlands U16	2	(0)
2008–2009	Netherlands U17	18	(0)
2010–2011	Netherlands U19	6	(0)
2012	Netherlands U20	5	(0)
2013	Netherlands U21	1	(0)
Medal record
Representing Netherlands
UEFA European Under-17 Championship
Runner-up	Germany 2009	U-17 Team
- * Club domestic league appearances and goals as of 12:19, 16 March 2024(UTC)

Dico Koppers (born 31 January 1992) is a Dutch professional footballer who plays as a left back for Sportlust '46 in the Derde Divisie.

== Club career ==
=== Ajax ===
Koppers began his footballing career in Utrecht, playing for the local amateur side SCH'44 in the town of Harmelen as a striker, before getting recruited by Ajax to join their youth ranks. Under coach Sonny Silooy it was quickly noticed that Koppers strengths lied in defending, after which he was moved back to a more defensive position on the pitch. Currently serving as a left back for the Ajax A1 youth selection, Koppers appeared in his first match for the senior squad on 23 October 2011, in the 'Klassieker' derby against arch-rivals Feyenoord, starting in the left back position and playing the full ninety minutes in the 1–1 draw at home. On 31 January 2013, it was announced that Koppers would complete the 2012–13 season with ADO Den Haag on a six-month loan spell. While in The Hague, Koppers made 14 league appearances, helping his side to a 9th-place finish in the league table.

=== FC Twente ===
On 23 July 2013, it was announced that Koppers had transferred to FC Twente on a four-year contract for a fee of €800,000.

=== Willem II ===
On 22 June 2015, it was announced that Koppers would sign a deal with Willem II.

== Career statistics ==
As of 30 December 2015

Club	Season	League			Cup		Continental		Other		Total	
Club	Season	Division	Apps	Goals	Apps	Goals	Apps	Goals	Apps	Goals	Apps	Goals
Ajax	2011–12	Eredivisie	8	0	0	0	2	0	0	0	10	0
Ajax	2012–13	Eredivisie	0	0	0	0	0	0	1	0	1	0
Ajax	Total		8	0	0	0	2	0	1	0	11	0
ADO Den Haag (loan)	2012–13	Eredivisie	14	0	0	0	0	0	—		14	0
Twente	2013–14	Eredivisie	23	0	1	0	0	0	—		24	0
Twente	2014–15	Eredivisie	9	0	3	0	0	0	—		12	0
Twente	Total		32	0	4	0	0	0	0	0	36	0
Jong FC Twente	2013–14	Eerste Divisie	2	0	–		–		–		2	0
Jong FC Twente	2014–15	Eerste Divisie	11	0	–		–		–		11	0
Jong FC Twente	Total		13	0	0	0	0	0	0	0	13	0
Willem II	2015–16	Eredivisie	13	0	2	0	0	0	0	0	15	0
Career total			67	0	6	0	2	0	1	0	76	0

== Honours ==
=== Club ===
Ajax

- Eredivisie: 2011–12
