= Shadrach Eghan =

Ghanaian footballer

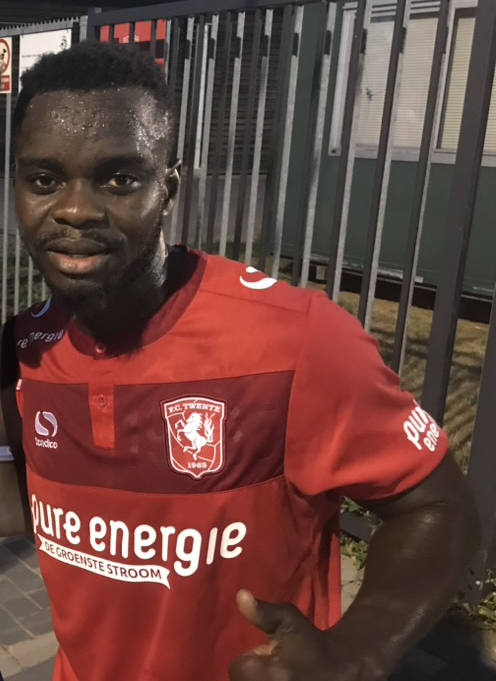

Personal information
- Full name: Shadrach Kwesi Eghan
- Date of birth: 4 July 1994 (age 32)
- Place of birth: Akosombo, Ghana
- Height: 1.65 m (5 ft 5 in)
- Position: Midfielder

Team information
- Current team: Al-Zawra'a

Youth career
- 2006–2009: Golden Boot Academy
- 2010: IFK Klagshamn
- 2010–2012: Golden Boot Academy

Senior career*
Years	Team	Apps	(Gls)
2013–2017	Twente	41	(6)
2014–2015	→ Jong FC Twente	7	(3)
2016	→ Stabæk (loan)	4	(0)
2017	Vendsyssel FF	4	(0)
2017–2018	Go Ahead Eagles	6	(0)
2018	→ Telstar (loan)	1	(0)
2019–	Al-Zawra'a		

International career
2013–2014	Ghana U20	5	(1)
- * Club domestic league appearances and goals as of 21:46, 9 May 2019 (UTC)

Shadrach Kwesi Eghan (born 4 July 1994) is a Ghanaian footballer who plays as a midfielder for Al-Zawra'a SC in Iraq.

== Career ==
Born in Akosombo, Eghan started his career with Akosombo-based Football Academie Golden Boot Academy. The summer of 2010, he joined the Swedish lower side IFK Klagshamn.

In January 2013, he joined Jong Twente from Golden-Boot Academy. He was coached by Patrick Kluivert. On 28 April 2013, Eghan made his debut for FC Twente in the match against NEC.

In 2019, he signed for Al-Zawraa in Iraq.

== Career statistics ==
As of 6 October 2016

Club	Season	League			Cup		Europe		Other		Total	
Club	Season	Division	Apps	Goals	Apps	Goals	Apps	Goals	Apps	Goals	Apps	Goals
Twente	2012–13	Eredivisie	2	0	0	0	0	0	0	0	2	0
Twente	2013–14	Eredivisie	24	5	1	0	0	0	0	0	25	5
Twente	2014–15	Eredivisie	11	1	1	0	2	0	0	0	14	1
Twente	2015–16	Eredivisie	4	0	0	0	0	0	0	0	4	0
Stabæk	2016	Tippeligaen	4	0	4	1	1	0	0	0	9	1
Career total			45	6	6	1	3	0	0	0	54	7
