= 2011 UEFA European Under-17 Championship =

Европско првенство у фудбалу до 17 година 2011.

Tournament details
- Host country: Serbia
- Dates: 3–15 May
- Teams: 8
- Venue: 4 (in 4 host cities)

Final positions
- Champions: Netherlands (1st title)
- Runners-up: Germany

Tournament statistics
- Matches played: 15
- Goals scored: 35 (2.33 per match)
- Attendance: 29,739 (1,983 per match)
- Top scorer(s): (Netherlands) Kyle Ebecilio (England) Hallam Hope (Netherlands) Tonny Vilhena (Germany) Samed Yeşil (3 goals each)
- Best player: (Netherlands) Kyle Ebecilio

The 2011 UEFA European Under-17 Championship was the tenth edition of UEFA's European Under-17 Football Championship. Serbia hosted the tournament between the 3 and 15 May. 6 Teams also qualified for the 2011 FIFA U-17 World Cup. Players born after 1 January 1994 were eligible to participate in this competition.

England was the defending champion, but lost in the semi-final. The Netherlands defeated Germany 5–2 in the final to win the championship for the first time.

== Qualification ==
The final tournament of the 2011 UEFA European Under-17 Championship was preceded by two qualification stages: a qualifying round and an Elite round. During these rounds, 52 national teams competed to determine the seven teams.

== Participants ==
- Czech Republic
- Denmark
- England
- France
- Germany
- Netherlands
- Romania
- Serbia (hosts)

== Match officials ==
A total of 6 referees, 8 assistant referees and 2 fourth officials were appointed for the final tournament.

Referees

- (Belgium) Sébastien Delferiere
- (Israel) Liran Liany
- (Scotland) Steven McLean
- (Portugal) Artur Ribeiro
- (Estonia) Kristo Tohver
- (Greece) Stavros Tritsonis

Assistant referees

- (Spain) Raúl Cabañero
- (Slovakia) Peter Chládek
- (Albania) Ridiger Çokaj
- (Armenia) Zaven Hovhannisyan
- (Bulgaria) Ivo Kolev
- (Georgia (country)) Giorgi Kruashvili
- (Lithuania) Arunas Šeškus
- (Hungary) Vencel Tóth

Fourth officials

- (Serbia) Vlado Glodovic
- (Serbia) Boško Jovanetić

== Group stage ==
All times are local (UTC+2).

Key to colours in group tables
Advance to semifinals and qualify to 2011 FIFA U-17 World Cup
Qualify to 2011 FIFA U-17 World Cup

=== Group A ===
Team	Pld	W	D	L	GF	GA	GD	Pts
Denmark	3	3	0	0	6	2	+4	9
England	3	1	1	1	5	4	+1	4
France	3	0	2	1	3	4	−1	2
Serbia	3	0	1	2	3	7	−4	1

3 May 2011
15:00

Serbia	2–3	Denmark
Ješić 31'; Ožegović 54'	Report	Johannesen 33'; Nastić 39' (o.g.); Fischer 76'

Stadion Karađorđe, Novi Sad
Attendance: 6,000
Referee: Steven McLean (Scotland)
3 May 2011
15:00

France	2–2	England
Haller 15', 65'	Report	Hope 8'; Powell 28'

Stadion FK Inđija, Inđija
Attendance: 2,100
Referee: Liran Liany (Israel)

6 May 2011
15:00

Serbia	1–1	France
Mandić 40'	Report	Meïté 40+1'

Stadion FK Smederevo, Smederevo
Attendance: 3,500
Referee: Stavros Tritsonis (Greece)
6 May 2011
15:00

Denmark	2–0	England
Fischer 13'; Zohore 21'	Report

Stadion Karađorđe, Novi Sad
Attendance: 1,082
Referee: Sébastien Delferiere (Belgium)

9 May 2011
17:15

England	3–0	Serbia
Smith 7'; Hope 9', 18'	Report

Stadion FK Inđija, Inđija
Attendance: 3,950
Referee: Kristo Tohver (Estonia)
9 May 2011
17:15

Denmark	1–0	France
Nørgaard 65'	Report

Stadion Karađorđe, Novi Sad
Attendance: 1,280
Referee: Artur Ribeiro (Portugal)

=== Group B ===
Team	Pld	W	D	L	GF	GA	GD	Pts
Netherlands	3	2	1	0	3	0	+3	7
Germany	3	1	1	1	2	3	−1	4
Czech Republic	3	0	3	0	2	2	0	3
Romania	3	0	1	2	1	3	−2	1

3 May 2011
17:00

Germany	0–2	Netherlands
	Report	Rekik 50'; Ebecilio 76'

Stadion FK Smederevo, Smederevo
Attendance: 1,009
Referee: Artur Ribeiro (Portugal)
3 May 2011
17:00

Czech Republic	1–1	Romania
Salašovič 77'	Report	Himcinschi 52'

Stadion FK Obilić, Belgrade
Attendance: 250
Referee: Kristo Tohver (Estonia)

6 May 2011
17:00

Germany	1–1	Czech Republic
Yeşil 80'	Report	Juliš 12'

Stadion FK Smederevo, Smederevo
Attendance: 881
Referee: Steven McLean (Scotland)
6 May 2011
17:00

Netherlands	1–0	Romania
Vilhena 8'	Report

Stadion FK Obilić, Belgrade
Attendance: 913
Referee: Liran Liany (Israel)

9 May 2011
13:00

Romania	0–1	Germany
	Report	Yeşil 42'

Stadion FK Smederevo, Smederevo
Attendance: 504
Referee: Stavros Tritsonis (Greece)
9 May 2011
13:00

Netherlands	0–0	Czech Republic
	Report

Stadion FK Obilić, Belgrade
Attendance: 450
Referee: Sébastien Delferiere (Belgium)

== Knockout stage ==
=== Knockout Map ===
Semi-finals
12 May – Novi Sad
Denmark	0
Germany	2
12 May – Novi Sad
Netherlands	1
England	0

Final
15 May – Novi Sad
Germany	2
Netherlands	5

All times are local (UTC+2).

=== Semifinals ===
12 May 2011
11:30

Netherlands	1–0	England
Ebecilio 26'	Report

Stadion Karađorđe, Novi Sad
Attendance: 921
Referee: Artur Ribeiro (Portugal)

12 May 2011
16:30

Denmark	0–2	Germany
	Report	Ayhan 58'; Quaschner 70'

Stadion Karađorđe, Novi Sad
Attendance: 2,638
Referee: Steven McLean (Scotland)

=== Final ===
15 May 2011
11:00

Germany	2–5	Netherlands
Yeşil 8'; Aydın 32'	Report	Vilhena 23', 34'; Depay 43'; Kongolo 52'; Ebecilio 77'

Stadion Karađorđe, Novi Sad
Attendance: 4,261
Referee: Kristo Tohver (Estonia)

== Goalscorers ==
3 goals

- (Netherlands) Kyle Ebecilio
- (England) Hallam Hope
- (Netherlands) Tonny Vilhena
- (Germany) Samed Yeşil

2 goals

- (Denmark) Viktor Fischer
- (France) Sébastien Haller

1 goal

- (Czech Republic) Lukáš Juliš
- (Czech Republic) Nikolas Salašovič
- (Denmark) Nicolai Johannesen
- (Denmark) Christian Nørgaard
- (Denmark) Kenneth Zohore
- (England) Nick Powell
- (England) Brad Smith
- (France) Souahilo Meïté
- (Germany) Kaan Ayhan
- (Germany) Nils Quaschner
- (Germany) Okan Aydın
- (Netherlands) Karim Rekik
- (Netherlands) Memphis Depay
- (Netherlands) Terence Kongolo
- (Romania) Fabian Himcinschi
- (Serbia) Vojno Ješić
- (Serbia) Nikola Mandić
- (Serbia) Ognjen Ožegović

own goals

- (Serbia) Bojan Nastić (for Denmark)

=== Golden boot ===
Player	Goals	Assists	Minutes played by player
(Netherlands) Tonny Vilhena	3	1	320
(Netherlands) Kyle Ebecilio	3	1	325
(Germany) Samed Yeşil	3	0	240
(England) Hallam Hope	3	0	291

== Tournament select squad ==
Goalkeepers

- (Netherlands) 1. Boy de Jong
- (Czech Republic) 16. Lukas Zima

Defenders

- (Denmark) 2. Mads Aaquist
- (England) 6. Nathaniel Chalobah
- (Denmark) 4. Nicolai Johannessen
- (Netherlands) 3. Terence Kongolo
- (Denmark) 3. Frederik Holst
- (France) 3. Benjamin Mendy
- (Germany) 2. Mitchell Weiser
- (Netherlands) 5. Jetro Willems

Midfielders

- (Netherlands) 8. Yassine Ayoub
- (Germany) 8. Emre Can
- (Netherlands) 6. Kyle Ebecilio
- (England) 4. John Lundstram
- (France) 8. Souahilo Meïté
- (Denmark) 6. Patrick Olsen

Attackers

- (Netherlands) 9. Anass Achahbar
- (Netherlands) 11. Memphis Depay
- (Denmark) 10. Viktor Fischer
- (Netherlands) 10. Tonny Vilhena
- (France) 10. Abdallah Yaisien
- (Germany) 9. Samed Yeşil
