= Kwame Quansah =

Ghanaian footballer

Personal information
- Full name: Kwame Gershion Quansah
- Date of birth: 24 November 1982 (age 43)
- Place of birth: Tema, Ghana
- Height: 1.70 m (5 ft 7 in)
- Position: Defensive midfielder

Youth career
- 1997–1999: Young Kotoko
- 2000–2001: Ajax

Senior career*
Years	Team	Apps	(Gls)
2000	Asante Kotoko	25	(2)
2000–2004	Ajax	1	(0)
2002–2003	→ Germinal Beerschot (loan)	30	(11)
2003–2004	→ AIK (loan)	18	(2)
2004–2014	Heracles Almelo	262	(19)
2016	Qingdao Red Lions		

International career
2008–2009	Ghana	2	(0)
- * Club domestic league appearances and goals

Kwame Gershion Quansah (born 24 November 1982) is a Ghanaian former professional footballer who played as a defensive midfielder.

== Club career ==
Quansah was born in Tema, Ghana. He previously played for Asante Kotoko, Ajax, Germinal Beerschot and AIK.

He subsequently joined Heracles Almelo in 2004, where he spent the major part of his career and became the club's record holder for most appearances in the Eredivisie with 262. This feat was only surpassed in December 2020, when Tim Breukers reached matched the record. His form in the 2008–09 season earned him two caps for Ghana.

Quansah retired in 2016, after a short stint in China with Qingdao Red Lions.

== International career ==
Quansah made his debut for the Ghana national football team on 15 October 2008 in a friendly against South Africa. He was called up to an African Cup of Nations qualifications game. He was part of Ghana national team preparation for World Cup 2006.

== Honours ==
Heracles Almelo

- Eerste Divisie: 2004–05
