= Michel Jansen =

Dutch football manager (born 1966)

Michel Jansen (born 3 March 1966) is a Dutch football manager and former player. He played for DETO Twenterand, Heracles Almelo, STEVO and Excelsior '31.

Jansen received the Rinus Michels Award in 2007 while coaching HHC Hardenberg.

Jansen became manager of FC Twente during the 2013–14 season because current manager Alfred Schreuder was not a qualified coach at that time. During the 2014–15 season he was the assistant manager of Alfred Schreuder, then he became coach of Jong Twente. Starting 2018 he is the assistant coach of SC Heerenveen.
