= Ruud Brood =

Dutch football manager and former player

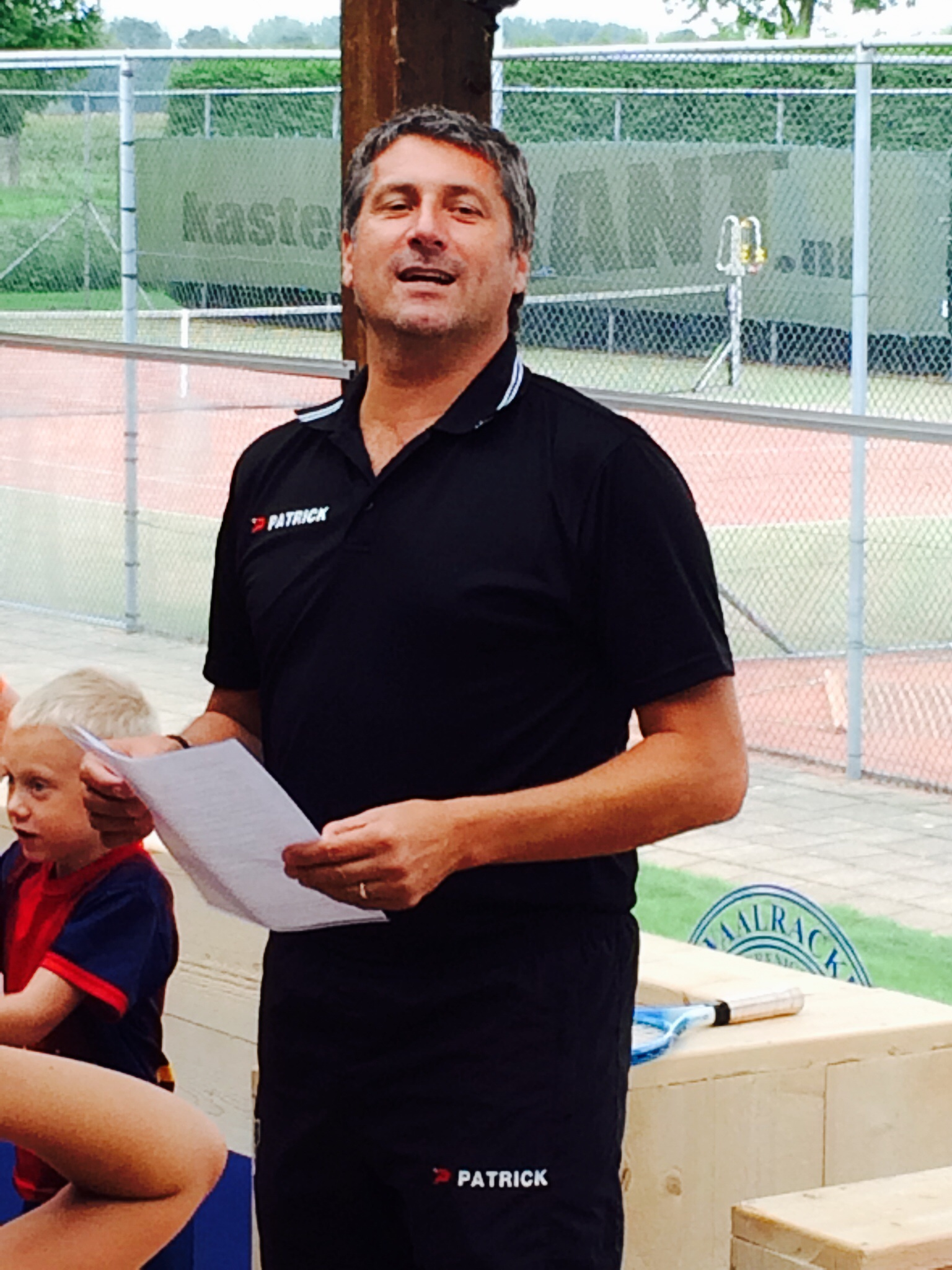
- Brood in 2014

Personal information
- Date of birth: 19 October 1962 (age 64)
- Place of birth: Gorinchem, Netherlands
- Position: Midfielder

Youth career
- SVW
- Unitas
- 1973–1983: Feyenoord

Senior career*
Years	Team	Apps	(Gls)
1983–1985	Feyenoord	0	(0)
1985–1987	RBC	68	(17)
1987–1989	Den Bosch	64	(5)
1989–1990	Willem II	22	(1)
1990–1998	NAC	153	(9)
Total		307	(32)

Managerial career
- 1997–2004: NAC (youth coach)
- 2004–2006: Helmond Sport
- 2006–2007: Heracles
- 2008–2012: RKC
- 2012–2013: Roda JC
- 2014–2015: NEC
- 2015–2018: PSV (assistant manager)
- 2019: NAC
- 2020–2022: ADO Den Haag
- 2023–2024: TOP Oss
- 2025: Kozakken Boys
- 2025–: Unitas
- * Club domestic league appearances and goals

Ruud Brood (born 19 October 1962) is a Dutch football manager and a former player who was most recently the manager of TOP Oss.

== Football career ==
=== Player ===
Brood was born in Gorinchem. After joining the Feyenoord youth academy from hometown amateur side Unitas, Brood was not able to break into Feyenoord's senior squad. He then served RBC (1985–1987), FC Den Bosch (1987–1989), Willem II Tilburg (1989–1990) and NAC Breda (1990–1998).

With Den Bosch, he finished 7th in the 1987–88 Eredivisie season and that won him a place in Rinus Michels' preliminary Euro 1988 squad. He did not make the final squad, which went on to win the Euro 1988 title.

=== Manager ===
He previously coached Helmond Sport, the second team of NAC Breda, Heracles Almelo, RKC Waalwijk and Roda JC Kerkrade. He was appointed manager of relegated NEC in 2014 and immediately led the club back to the Eredivisie. In summer 2015 he became assistant to Phillip Cocu at PSV Eindhoven.

On 22 June 2023, Brood was hired as a manager by TOP Oss in the Eerste Divisie with a one-year deal.

He returned to childhood club Unitas in summer 2025 after steering Kozakken Boys to the Tweede Divisie. He had succeeded Edwin Grünholz in February 2025 at the Werkendam club.

== Managerial honours ==
=== Club ===
RKC Waalwijk

- Eerste Divisie (1): 2010–11

NEC

- Eerste Divisie (1): 2014–15
