= Tim Breukers =

Dutch professional footballer

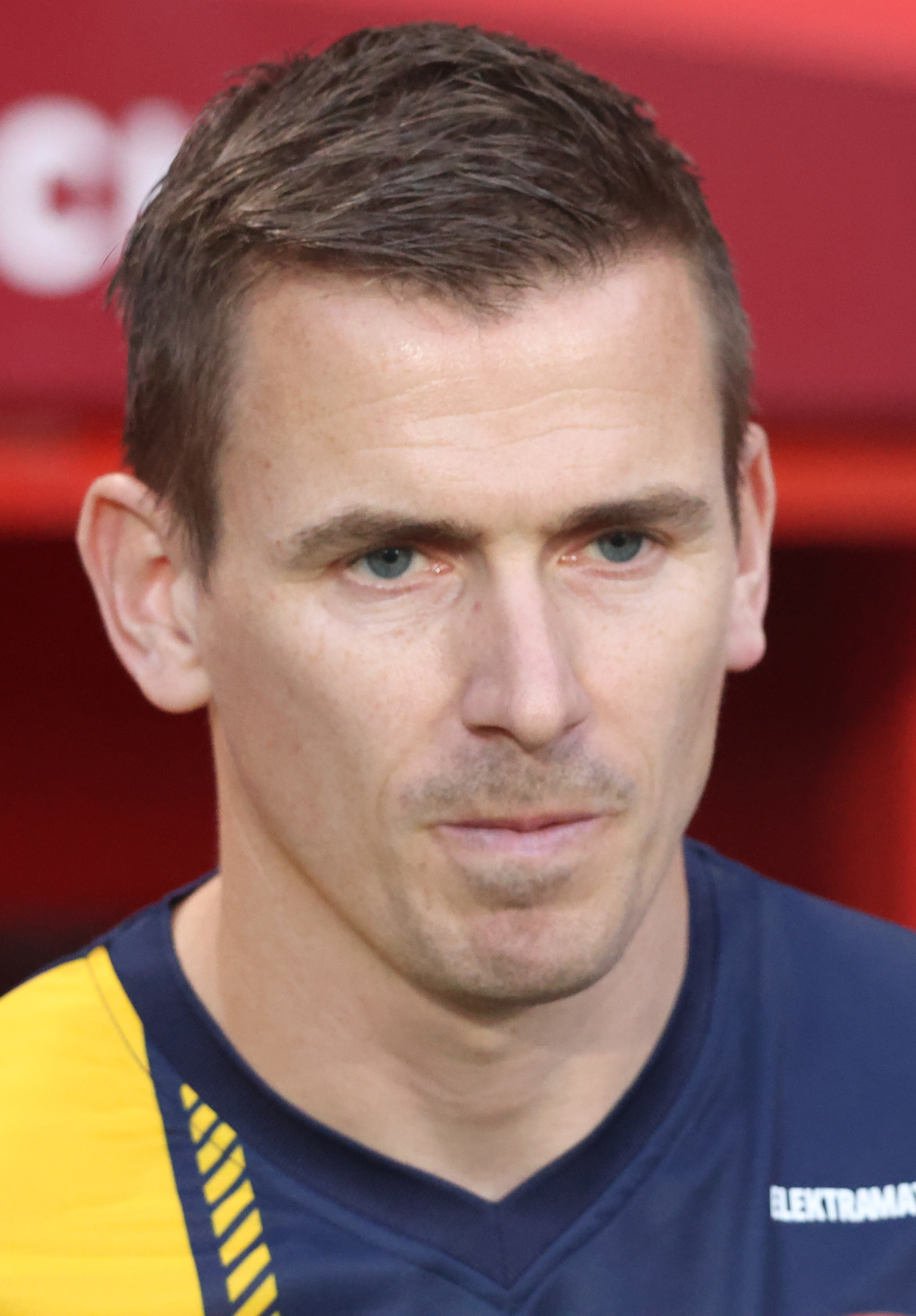
- Breukers in 2023

Personal information
- Full name: Tim Gerard Johan Breukers
- Date of birth: 4 November 1987 (age 39)
- Place of birth: Oldenzaal, Netherlands
- Height: 1.78 m (5 ft 10 in)
- Position: Right back

Youth career
- Quick '20
- Heracles Almelo

Senior career*
Years	Team	Apps	(Gls)
2007–2012	Heracles Almelo	134	(0)
2012–2015	Twente	23	(0)
2013–2015	→ Jong Twente	16	(0)
2015	→ Heracles Almelo (loan)	15	(0)
2015–2021	Heracles Almelo	133	(1)
Total		321	(1)
- * Club domestic league appearances and goals

Tim Gerard Johan Breukers (born 4 November 1987) is a Dutch former professional footballer who played as a right back.

== Club career ==
Breukers joined FC Twente from Heracles in 2012, before he returned to his former club. After spending half a season on loan with Heracles Almelo, he made a permanent transfer in June 2015.

== Career statistics ==
As of match played 21 January 2018

Appearances and goals by club, season and competition
Club	Season	League			KNVB Beker		Other		Total	
Club	Season	Division	Apps	Goals	Apps	Goals	Apps	Goals	Apps	Goals
Heracles Almelo	2007–08	Eredivisie	6	0	0	0	0	0	6	0
Heracles Almelo	2008–09	Eredivisie	27	0	0	0	0	0	27	0
Heracles Almelo	2009–10	Eredivisie	36	0	2	0	0	0	38	0
Heracles Almelo	2010–11	Eredivisie	34	0	2	0	0	0	36	0
Heracles Almelo	2011–12	Eredivisie	31	0	6	0	0	0	37	0
Heracles Almelo	Total		134	0	10	0	0	0	144	0
FC Twente	2012–13	Eredivisie	13	0	1	0	5 (Note: Appearances in the Europa League)	0	19	0
FC Twente	2013–14	Eredivisie	5	0	0	0	0	0	5	0
FC Twente	2014–15	Eredivisie	5	0	0	0	0	0	5	0
FC Twente	Total		23	0	1	0	5	0	29	0
Jong FC Twente	2013–14	Eerste Divisie	11	0	–		–		11	0
Jong FC Twente	2014–15	Eerste Divisie	5	0	–		–		5	0
Jong FC Twente	Total		16	0	–		0	0	16	0
Heracles Almelo (loan)	2014–15	Eredivisie	15	0	0	0	0	0	15	0
Heracles Almelo	2015–16	Eredivisie	5	0	1	1	2 (Note: Appearances in the Eredivisie European competition play-offs)	0	8	1
Heracles Almelo	2016–17	Eredivisie	25	0	2	0	2	0	29	0
Heracles Almelo	2017–18	Eredivisie	16	0	2	1	0	0	18	1
Heracles Almelo	Total		46	0	5	2	4	0	55	2
Career total			234	0	16	2	9	0	259	2
