= Dario Tanda =

Dutch-born footballer (born 1995)

Personal information
- Full name: Dario Tanda
- Date of birth: 2 January 1995 (age 31)
- Place of birth: Deventer, Netherlands
- Height: 1.73 m (5 ft 8 in)
- Position: Attacking midfielder

Team information
- Current team: SV Sportlust Glanerbrug

Youth career
- DVV Sallandia
- Koninklijke UD
- –2009: Go Ahead Eagles
- 2009–2013: FC Twente

Senior career*
Years	Team	Apps	(Gls)
2013–2015	FC Twente	2	(0)
2013–2015	→ Jong FC Twente	41	(1)
2015	Go Ahead Eagles	0	(0)
2016	PEC Zwolle	7	(0)
2017	Vendsyssel FF	0	(0)
2017	Montegiorgio Calcio	?	(?)
2017–	SV Sportlust Glanerbrug	?	(?)

International career
2011	Netherlands U-17	2	(0)
- * Club domestic league appearances and goals

Dario Tanda (born 2 January 1995) is a Dutch footballer who plays as an attacking midfielder for SV Sportlust Glanerbrug. He formerly played for FC Twente and Go Ahead Eagles.

Born to Italian parents, Tanda has Italian-Dutch dual citizenship.

Tanda played for Danish club Vendsyssel FF for 5 days.
