= 2012–13 Eredivisie =

57th season of the Eredivisie

Eredivisie
- Season: 2012–13
- Dates: 10 August 2012 – 5 May 2013
- Champions: Ajax (32nd title)
- Relegated: Willem II; VVV-Venlo
- Champions League: Ajax; PSV
- Europa League: Feyenoord; Vitesse Arnhem; AZ; Utrecht
- Matches: 306
- Goals: 964 (3.15 per match)
- Top goalscorer: Wilfried Bony (31 goals)
- Biggest home win: PSV 7–0 ADO Den Haag
- Biggest away win: VVV 0–6 PSV
- Highest scoring: Heracles Almelo 6–3 Heerenveen
- Longest winning run: 8 games PSV
- Longest unbeaten run: 14 games Ajax
- Longest winless run: 10 games NEC
- Longest losing run: 6 games VVV-Venlo
- Total attendance: 4,596,704
- Average attendance: 18,838

The 2012–13 Eredivisie was the 57th season of Eredivisie, since its establishment in 1955. It began on 10 August 2012 with the first match of the season and ended on 26 May 2013, with the last matches of the European competition and relegation play-offs. This is the first time VAR has been used for testing.

== Teams ==
Location of teams in Eredivisie 2012–13

A total of 18 teams took part in the league: The best fifteen teams from the 2011–12 season, two promotion/relegation playoff winners and the 2011–12 Eerste Divisie champions.

Club	Location	Venue	Capacity
ADO Den Haag	The Hague	Kyocera Stadion	15,000
Ajax	Amsterdam	Amsterdam Arena	52,651
AZ	Alkmaar	AFAS Stadion	17,023
Feyenoord	Rotterdam	Stadion Feijenoord	51,177
Groningen	Groningen	Euroborg	22,550
Heerenveen	Heerenveen	Abe Lenstra Stadion	26,100
Heracles	Almelo	Polman Stadion	8,500
NAC	Breda	Rat Verlegh Stadion	19,005
NEC	Nijmegen	Stadion de Goffert	12,500
PEC Zwolle	Zwolle	IJsseldelta Stadion	11,324
PSV	Eindhoven	Philips Stadion	35,000
RKC Waalwijk	Waalwijk	Mandemakers Stadion	7,508
Roda JC	Kerkrade	Parkstad Limburg Stadion	18,936
Twente	Enschede	De Grolsch Veste	30,014
Utrecht	Utrecht	Stadion Galgenwaard	23,750
Vitesse Arnhem	Arnhem	GelreDome	25,000
VVV-Venlo	Venlo	De Koel	8,000
Willem II	Tilburg	Koning Willem II Stadion	14,500

=== Personnel and kits ===
Note: Flags indicate national team as has been defined under FIFA eligibility rules. Players and managers may hold more than one non-FIFA nationality.

Team	Manager	Captain	Kit manufacturer	Shirt sponsor
ADO Den Haag	(Netherlands) Maurice Steijn	(Netherlands) Danny Holla	Erreà	Basic-Fit Fitness
Ajax	(Netherlands) Frank de Boer	(Netherlands) Siem de Jong	adidas	Aegon
AZ	(Netherlands) Gertjan Verbeek	(Netherlands) Nick Viergever	Macron	AFAS software
Feyenoord	(Netherlands) Ronald Koeman	(Netherlands) Stefan de Vrij	Puma	ASR
Groningen	(Netherlands) Robert Maaskant	(Netherlands) Kees Kwakman	Klupp	Essent
Heerenveen	(Netherlands) Marco van Basten	(Netherlands) Ramon Zomer	Jako	Univé
Heracles	(Netherlands) Peter Bosz	(Ghana) Kwame Quansah	Erima	TenCate
NAC	(Serbia) Nebojša Gudelj	(Netherlands) Jelle ten Rouwelaar	Patrick	SunWeb
NEC	(Netherlands) Alex Pastoor	(Hungary) Gábor Babos	Jako	Scholten Awater
PEC Zwolle	(Netherlands) Art Langeler	(Netherlands) Arne Slot	Patrick	Beaphar
PSV	(Netherlands) Dick Advocaat	(Netherlands) Mark van Bommel	Nike	Philips
RKC Waalwijk	(Netherlands) Erwin Koeman	(Netherlands) Ard van Peppen	Nike	Mandemakens Keukens
Roda JC	(Netherlands) Ruud Brood	(Syria) Sanharib Malki	Lotto	Toverland
Twente	(Netherlands) Alfred Schreuder (caretaker)	(Netherlands) Wout Brama	Nike	Arke
Utrecht	(Netherlands) Jan Wouters	(Ghana) Nana Akwasi Asare	hummel	HealthCity
Vitesse	(Netherlands) Fred Rutten	(Georgia (country)) Guram Kashia	Nike	—
VVV-Venlo	(Netherlands) Ton Lokhoff	(Netherlands) Jeffrey Leiwakabessy	Masita	Seacon Logistics
Willem II	(Netherlands) Jurgen Streppel	(Netherlands) Hans Mulder	Macron	Pondres

=== Managerial changes ===
Team	Outgoing manager	Manner of departure	Date of vacancy	Position in table	Replaced by	Date of appointment
SC Heerenveen	(Netherlands) Ron Jans	End of contract	1 July 2012	Pre-season	(Netherlands) Marco van Basten	1 July 2012
Roda JC Kerkrade	(Belgium) Harm van Veldhoven	End of contract	1 July 2012	Pre-season	(Netherlands) Ruud Brood	1 July 2012
RKC Waalwijk	(Netherlands) Ruud Brood	Signed by Roda JC Kerkrade	1 July 2012	Pre-season	(Netherlands) Erwin Koeman	1 July 2012
PSV	(Netherlands) Phillip Cocu	End of interim spell	1 July 2012	Pre-season	(Netherlands) Dick Advocaat	1 July 2012
FC Groningen	(Netherlands) Pieter Huistra	Sacked	10 May 2012	Pre-season	(Netherlands) Robert Maaskant	1 July 2012
Vitesse Arnhem	(Netherlands) John van den Brom	Signed by Anderlecht	1 July 2012	Pre-season	(Netherlands) Fred Rutten	1 July 2012
NAC Breda	(Netherlands) John Karelse	Sacked	23 October 2012	17th	(Netherlands) Adri Bogers (caretaker)	23 October 2012
NAC Breda	(Netherlands) Adri Bogers	End of caretaker spell	21 November 2012	15th	(Serbia) Nebojša Gudelj	21 November 2012
FC Twente	(England) Steve McClaren	Resigned	26 February 2013	5th	(Netherlands) Alfred Schreuder (caretaker)	26 February 2013

== League table ==
Pos	Team	Pld	W	D	L	GF	GA	GD	Pts	Qualification or relegation
1	Ajax (C)	34	22	10	2	83	31	+52	76	Qualification for the Champions League group stage
2	PSV	34	22	3	9	103	43	+60	69	Qualification for the Champions League third qualifying round
3	Feyenoord	34	21	6	7	64	38	+26	69	Qualification to Europa League play-off round
4	Vitesse Arnhem	34	19	7	8	68	42	+26	64	Qualification for the Europa League third qualifying round
5	Utrecht (O)	34	19	6	9	55	41	+14	63	Qualification to European competition play-offs
6	Twente	34	17	11	6	60	33	+27	62	Qualification to European competition play-offs
7	Groningen	34	12	7	15	36	53	−17	43	Qualification to European competition play-offs
8	Heerenveen	34	11	9	14	50	63	−13	42	Qualification to European competition play-offs
9	ADO Den Haag	34	9	13	12	49	63	−14	40	
10	AZ	34	10	9	15	56	54	+2	39	Qualification for the Europa League play-off round (Note: AZ qualified for the play-off of the 2013–14 UEFA Europa League after winning the 2012–13 KNVB Cup.)
11	PEC Zwolle	34	10	9	15	42	55	−13	39	
12	Heracles Almelo	34	9	11	14	58	71	−13	38	
13	NAC Breda	34	10	8	16	40	56	−16	38	
14	RKC Waalwijk	34	9	10	15	39	48	−9	37	
15	NEC Nijmegen	34	10	7	17	44	66	−22	37	
16	Roda JC (O)	34	7	12	15	51	69	−18	33	Qualification for the relegation play-offs
17	VVV-Venlo (R)	34	6	10	18	33	62	−29	28	Qualification for the relegation play-offs
18	Willem II (R)	34	5	8	21	33	76	−43	23	Relegation to Eerste Divisie

Source: Eredivisie
Rules for classification: 1) points; 2) goal difference; 3) number of goals scored.
(C) Champions; (O) Play-off winners; (R) Relegated

== Results ==
Home \ Away	ADO	AJX	AZ	FEY	GRO	HEE	HER	NAC	NEC	PEC	PSV	RKC	RJC	TWE	UTR	VIT	VVV	WIL
ADO Den Haag		1–1	2–2	2–0	0–1	2–1	3–1	2–1	2–0	1–1	1–6	2–2	2–2	1–3	1–2	0–4	1–1	2–0
Ajax	1–1		2–2	3–0	2–0	1–1	4–0	5–0	4–1	3–0	3–1	2–0	1–1	1–0	1–1	0–2	2–0	5–0
AZ	1–1	2–3		0–2	0–1	0–0	3–1	0–1	0–2	4–0	1–3	3–3	4–0	0–3	6–0	4–1	1–2	0–0
Feyenoord	3–2	2–2	3–1		2–1	1–1	6–0	1–0	5–1	2–0	2–1	2–0	5–2	0–0	2–1	2–0	1–0	3–0
Groningen	2–1	0–2	1–1	2–2		3–1	2–0	1–1	1–2	1–0	1–3	2–1	3–2	0–3	0–2	0–3	0–0	1–1
Heerenveen	1–3	2–2	0–4	2–0	3–0		0–1	2–0	0–2	2–1	2–1	0–2	4–4	2–1	2–4	2–1	2–2	3–2
Heracles	3–3	3–3	1–2	1–2	0–2	6–3		2–1	1–0	1–1	1–5	4–0	5–1	1–1	1–1	3–5	1–1	4–1
NAC Breda	0–3	0–2	2–1	2–2	0–1	1–2	1–1		2–0	3–0	1–6	2–1	5–3	0–1	1–1	0–3	1–0	4–0
N.E.C.	1–1	1–6	1–1	0–3	2–1	1–3	3–2	1–1		1–3	1–1	1–2	0–0	1–3	2–0	2–1	1–2	0–0
PEC Zwolle	4–2	2–4	1–2	3–2	1–2	1–1	0–3	2–0	0–4		1–2	1–1	3–2	1–1	1–2	0–1	0–0	2–0
PSV Eindhoven	7–0	2–3	5–1	3–0	5–2	5–1	4–0	4–0	4–2	1–3		2–0	5–0	3–0	2–1	1–2	2–0	3–2
RKC Waalwijk	4–0	0–2	2–1	1–1	1–1	0–1	1–1	0–4	2–0	1–2	3–2		1–0	0–1	4–0	3–2	1–1	0–0
Roda JC	0–0	1–2	2–2	0–1	4–1	1–0	3–3	0–0	2–0	1–1	2–2	3–1		1–1	0–1	3–3	3–0	3–0
Twente	2–0	0–2	3–0	3–0	4–1	1–0	3–2	1–1	5–2	2–2	3–1	0–0	2–0		2–4	0–1	1–0	1–1
Utrecht	1–0	0–0	2–1	0–1	1–0	3–1	3–0	3–0	0–3	1–1	1–0	1–0	4–0	1–1		1–2	2–1	3–1
Vitesse Arnhem	2–2	3–2	1–2	1–0	2–0	3–3	1–1	3–0	4–1	2–1	2–2	2–2	3–0	0–0	2–0		0–1	3–1
VVV-Venlo	2–4	0–3	1–4	2–3	0–0	1–1	0–2	1–4	2–2	0–2	0–6	1–0	2–4	2–2	1–3	3–1		4–1
Willem II	1–1	2–4	2–0	1–3	1–2	3–1	2–2	1–1	2–3	0–1	1–3	1–0	2–1	2–6	1–5	0–2	1–0	

Source: Eredivisie
Legend: Blue = home team win; Yellow = draw; Red = away team win.

== Play-offs ==
=== European competition ===
The teams placed fifth through eighth competed in a play-off tournament for one spot in the second qualifying round of the 2013–14 UEFA Europa League. Teams on the left played the first leg at home.

==== Semi-finals ====
The first legs were played on 16 May 2013, while the return legs were played on 19 May 2013.

Team 1	Agg.	Team 2	1st leg	2nd leg
Groningen	2–4	Twente	0–1	2–3
SC Heerenveen	1–3	Utrecht	0–1	1–2

==== Finals ====
Team 1	Agg.	Team 2	1st leg	2nd leg
Twente	2–3	Utrecht	0–2	2–1

=== Relegation ===
Roda JC and VVV-Venlo joined the Eerste Divisie-teams for the play-offs, after finishing 16th and 17th in the Eredivisie.

==== Round 1 ====
Team 1	Agg.	Team 2	1st leg	2nd leg
FC Dordrecht	3–6	Go Ahead Eagles	3–3	0–3
De Graafschap	5–2	Fortuna Sittard	2–1	3–1

==== Round 2 ====
Team 1	Agg.	Team 2	1st leg	2nd leg
Go Ahead Eagles	4–0	VVV-Venlo	1–0	3–0
MVV Maastricht	1–4	FC Volendam	0–1	1–3
Helmond Sport	3–5	Sparta Rotterdam	2–4	1–1
De Graafschap	2–7	Roda JC	1–1	1–6

==== Round 3 ====
Team 1	Agg.	Team 2	1st leg	2nd leg
Go Ahead Eagles	3–1	FC Volendam	3–0	0–1
Sparta Rotterdam	1–2	Roda JC	0–0	1–2

== Season statistics ==
=== Top scorers ===
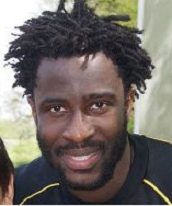
Wilfried Bony

Rank	Player	Club	Goals
1	(Ivory Coast) Wilfried Bony	Vitesse Arnhem	31
2	(Italy) Graziano Pellè	Feyenoord	27
3	(Iceland) Alfreð Finnbogason	Heerenveen	24
4	(United States) Jozy Altidore	AZ	23
5	(Syria) Sanharib Malki	Roda JC	17
6	(Belgium) Dries Mertens	PSV	16
7	(Netherlands) Jeremain Lens	PSV	15
8	(Zambia) Jacob Mulenga	Utrecht	14
8	(Netherlands) Georginio Wijnaldum	PSV	14
10	(Netherlands) Luc Castaignos	Twente	13

== Awards ==
=== Annual awards ===
Annual awards
Award	Winner	Club
Eredivisie Player of the Year	(Ivory Coast) Wilfried Bony	Vitesse
Rinus Michels Award — Trainer of the Year	(Netherlands) Frank de Boer	Ajax
Johan Cruyff Trophy — Talent of the Year	(Netherlands) Marco van Ginkel	Vitesse

Team of the Season
Goalkeeper	(Netherlands) Jeroen Zoet (RKC Waalwijk)			
Defenders	(Netherlands) Daryl Janmaat (Feyenoord)	(Netherlands) Stefan de Vrij (Feyenoord)	(Belgium) Toby Alderweireld (Ajax)	(Netherlands) Daley Blind (Ajax)
Midfielders	(Netherlands) Marco van Ginkel (Vitesse)	(Netherlands) Jordy Clasie (Feyenoord)	(Denmark) Christian Eriksen (Ajax)	
Forwards	(Belgium) Dries Mertens (PSV)	(Ivory Coast) Wilfried Bony (Vitesse)		(Italy) Graziano Pellè (Feyenoord)

== Attendances ==
No.	Club	Average	Change	Highest
1	AFC Ajax	50,490	0,7%	53,052
2	Feyenoord	45,324	1,6%	48,000
3	PSV	33,176	-0,6%	34,600
4	FC Twente	29,453	6,3%	30,000
5	sc Heerenveen	24,683	-2,5%	26,100
6	FC Groningen	21,077	-3,4%	22,505
7	SBV Vitesse	18,423	5,1%	22,315
8	FC Utrecht	17,512	-10,6%	19,566
9	NAC Breda	17,324	-2,0%	19,000
10	AZ	16,286	-0,5%	17,016
11	Roda JC	13,517	-5,8%	17,159
12	NEC	11,924	-1,9%	12,500
13	Willem II	11,313	18,5%	13,825
14	PEC Zwolle	10,762	25,8%	11,324
15	ADO Den Haag	10,503	-13,6%	14,009
16	Heracles Almelo	8,429	-0,3%	8,500
17	VVV-Venlo	6,765	-10,0%	8,000
18	RKC Waalwijk	6,178	-1,6%	7,508
