= Alfred Schreuder =

Dutch football player and manager (born 1972)

Personal information
- Date of birth: 2 November 1972 (age 54)
- Place of birth: Barneveld, Netherlands
- Height: 1.80 m (5 ft 11 in)
- Position: Midfielder

Team information
- Current team: Kasımpaşa (head coach)

Youth career
- SDV Barneveld
- Feyenoord

Senior career*
Years	Team	Apps	(Gls)
1991–1993	Feyenoord	1	(0)
1993–1997	RKC Waalwijk	117	(7)
1997–2003	NAC Breda	183	(8)
2003–2007	Feyenoord	36	(0)
2004–2005	→ RKC Waalwijk (loan)	20	(0)
2007–2008	Twente	3	(0)
2008	SDV Barneveld		
2008–2009	Vitesse	6	(0)

Managerial career
- 2013: Twente (caretaker)
- 2014–2015: Twente
- 2019–2020: 1899 Hoffenheim
- 2022: Club Brugge
- 2022–2023: Ajax
- 2023: Al Ain
- 2023–2025: Al Nasr
- 2025–2026: Al-Diriyah
- 2026–: Kasımpaşa
- * Club domestic league appearances and goals

Alfred Schreuder (Dutch pronunciation: [ˈɑlfrət (frɛt) ˈsxrøːdər]; born 2 November 1972) is a Dutch football coach and former player who is the head coach of Süper Lig club Kasımpaşa.

== Club career ==
During his career, Schreuder played for RKC Waalwijk, NAC Breda, Feyenoord, Twente and Vitesse. After he had stopped playing for Twente in March 2008, he joined SDV Barneveld on an amateur basis. After about three months, he returned as professional football player, signing a contract for one year at Vitesse. He retired in January 2009.

== Managerial career ==
Schreuder started his managerial career immediately after his retirement as assistant manager of Vitesse. In the summer of 2009, he signed with Twente to be the assistant manager of Steve McClaren. After McClaren resigned his position on 26 February 2013, Schreuder was appointed as interim manager. However, in March 2013, the club officially appointed Michel Jansen as head coach and Schreuder as his assistant, because Schreuder was not yet appropriately licensed as a manager. This arrangement continued for the 2013–14 season, while Schreuder was studying for the UEFA Pro Licence, which he obtained in May 2014. Subsequently, Schreuder was installed as manager of Twente, with Jansen as his assistant. On 30 August 2015, Schreuder was sacked after winning one point in the first four matches of the 2015–16 season.

On 26 October 2015, Schreuder was appointed the assistant manager of Huub Stevens at 1899 Hoffenheim. After Stevens' resignation on 10 February 2016, he remained at the club as the assistant of Julian Nagelsmann.

On 5 January 2018, it was announced that Ajax had reached an agreement with Hoffenheim to sign Schreuder as the assistant of their new head coach Erik ten Hag.

In March 2019, it was announced that Schreuder would succeed Julian Nagelsmann as head of Hoffenheim from 1 July 2019, after signing a contract until 2022. However he was sacked by the club on 9 June 2020, since his form was not up to the expectations of the board.

In August 2020, Schreuder joined Barcelona as assistant manager under Ronald Koeman, both signing a two-year deal with an escape-clause option after the first year.

On 3 January 2022, Schreuder was appointed as head coach of Club Brugge, replacing Philippe Clement who left to manage Monaco. After winning the Belgian League, he was appointed by Ajax on a two-year contract from the 2022–23 season onwards, replacing Erik ten Hag who left to manage Manchester United. On 26 January 2023, he was sacked from his position at Ajax due to poor results.

In May 2023, Schreuder was appointed as head coach of UAE Pro League club Al Ain. Six months later, although he managed to win 13 of his 15 games in charge, Schreuder was sacked, with Al Ain announcing that the decision had been taken "due to the lack of consistency between the coach and his coaching staff with the Company's institutional work system".

On 27 November 2023, Schreuder was appointed as manager of fellow UAE Pro League club Al Nasr SC.

On 6 December 2025, Schreuder was appointed as manager of Saudi First Division League club Al-Diriyah.

== Personal life ==
His brother Dick was also a footballer, and joined him in coaching at Hoffenheim.

== Career statistics ==
Appearances and goals by club, season and competition
Club	Season	League		
Club	Season	Division	Apps	Goals
Feyenoord	1991–92	Eredivisie	1	0
Feyenoord	1992–93	Eredivisie	0	0
Feyenoord	Total		1	0
RKC Waalwijk	1993–94	Eredivisie	29	1
RKC Waalwijk	1994–95	Eredivisie	30	3
RKC Waalwijk	1995–96	Eredivisie	29	1
RKC Waalwijk	1996–97	Eredivisie	29	2
RKC Waalwijk	Total		117	7
NAC Breda	1997–98	Eredivisie	28	0
NAC Breda	1998–99	Eredivisie	31	1
NAC Breda	1999–2000	Eerste Divisie	32	3
NAC Breda	2000–01	Eredivisie	24	2
NAC Breda	2001–02	Eredivisie	34	0
NAC Breda	2002–03	Eredivisie	34	2
NAC Breda	Total		183	8
Feyenoord	2003–04	Eredivisie	25	0
Feyenoord	2005–06	Eredivisie	1	0
Feyenoord	2006–07	Eredivisie	10	0
Feyenoord	Total		36	0
RKC Waalwijk (loan)	2004–05	Eredivisie	20	0
Twente	2007–08	Eredivisie	3	0
SDV Barneveld		Eerste Klasse		
Vitesse	2008–09	Eredivisie	6	0
Career total			366	15

== Managerial statistics ==
As of match played 22 November 2026

Managerial record by team and tenure
Team	Nat	From	To	Record								Ref
Team	Nat	From	To	G	W	D	L	GF	GA	GD	Win %	Ref
Twente (interim)	(Netherlands)	26 February 2013	1 April 2013	4	1	1	2	4	4	+0	25.00	
Twente	(Netherlands)	1 July 2014	30 August 2015	45	16	15	14	71	65	+6	35.56	
1899 Hoffenheim	(Germany)	1 July 2019	9 June 2020	33	13	8	12	50	57	−7	39.39	
Club Brugge	(Belgium)	3 January 2022	23 May 2022	21	15	4	2	40	14	+26	71.43	
Ajax	(Netherlands)	24 May 2022	26 January 2023	26	12	7	7	63	41	+22	46.15	
Al Ain	(United Arab Emirates)	27 May 2023	8 November 2023	14	12	0	2	41	15	+26	85.71	
Al Nasr	(United Arab Emirates)	27 November 2023	24 May 2025	63	31	13	19	111	97	+14	49.21	
Diriyah Club	(Saudi Arabia)	6 December 2025	13 May 2026	23	15	3	5	55	28	+27	65.22	
Kasımpaşa	(Turkey)	4 November 2026	present	2	2	0	0	4	1	+3	100.00	
Total				231	117	51	63	439	322	+117	50.65	—

== Honours ==
=== Player ===
NAC Breda

- Eerste Divisie: 1999–2000

Feyenoord

- Eredivisie: 1992–93
- KNVB Cup: 1991–92
- Johan Cruyff Shield: 1991

=== Manager ===
Club Brugge

- Belgian First Division A: 2021–22
