= 2014–15 Feyenoord season =

Feyenoord
2014–15 season
- Chairman: Dick van Well
- Manager: Fred Rutten
- Stadium: De Kuip
- Eredivisie: 4th
- European competition play-offs: Semi-finals
- KNVB Cup: Second round
- Champions League: Third qualifying round
- Europa League: Round of 32
- Top goalscorer: League: Colin Kazim-Richards (11); All: Colin Kazim-Richards (13)
- Highest home attendance: 50,000
- Lowest home attendance: 30,000
- Average home league attendance: 45,272
Home colours	Away colours	Third colours

The 2014–15 season was Feyenoord's 107th season of play, it marked its 59th season in the Eredivisie and its 93rd consecutive season in the top flight of Dutch football. It was first season with manager Fred Rutten. The club was busy during the summer transfer window, selling or releasing of 12 players and signing 13 new players. Feyenoord had a bad start of the season, dropping to 15th place in the league after losing three and drawing two of its first six league games. They played only the second round of the KNVB Cup; they were knocked out by Go Ahead Eagles. The club also lasted a single round in the Champions League; the third qualifying round consisted of two losses to Beşiktaş. They reached the Europa League group stage by beating Zorya Luhansk 4–3 at home after an away draw. The team improved after this early showing. A five-game winning streak catapulted them to third place in the Eredivisie by mid fall. They also reached the knockout phase of the Europa League by beating Standard Liège, HNK Rijeka and title holders Sevilla in the group phase. They went into the winter break placed third in the league.

The club started in mediocre form after the winter break, winning three out of six games, while remaining in third place. Their round of 32 match-up in the Europa League against Roma marked the end of their European campaign; they lost 2–3 on aggregate. This started off a strong showing in the Eredivisie in which they won five out of six games, solidifying their third position in the league. Their season turned sour after this; they only collected two points in the final five games of the season. This skid landed them in fourth place at the end of the season. They lost their play-off match-up with Heerenveen for the last remaining European ticket, which means they will only play domestically in the 2015–16 season.

== Background ==
Feyenoord is one of the Big Three football clubs in the Netherlands having played at the highest level of competition uninterrupted since 1921. The previous three seasons the club was coached by Ronald Koeman; he announced his intention to leave the club in February 2014. During these three seasons Feyenoord finished second, third and second in the league, they got ousted from the cup twice in the quarter-finals and once in the third round. Their European campaigns were short-lived with five losses and one draw during these three years. A month after Koeman's announcement, Fred Rutten was presented as the new manager.

The club started their 2013–14 season with three straight league losses and an immediate exit from European football. They got knocked out of the cup in the quarter-finals. The team managed to come back from their early 17th league position and climbed to fourth place by the halfway point. They stayed in this position for most of the second half of the season and went on a winning streak to finish the 2013–14 Eredivisie in second place. This position gave the club an entry berth in the 2014–15 UEFA Champions League. Five Feyenoord players from this season were selected for the Dutch squad for the 2014 FIFA World Cup – Feyenoord contributed the most players to the Dutch team. Nine out of all World Cup players were trained by Feyenoord; they were the club that contributed most worldwide to develop players for this event.

== Review and events ==
=== Pre-season ===
Feyenoord started the pre-season preparations with its first training session on 25 June 2014 in front of 5,000 fans. They beat amateur sides SV Honselersdijk, VOC, FC Horst and ASWH in pre-season friendlies. Graziano Pellè, the top goals scorer of the two previous seasons, transferred to Southampton, managed by Ronald Koeman who coached Feyenoord the previous three seasons, for eight million euros. The club announced they had acquired former international defender Khalid Boulahrouz on a free transfer several days later. On 15 July, the transfer of Daryl Janmaat to Newcastle United and Bruno Martins Indi to Porto was announced, both played as defensive backs the previous season and were bronze medalists in the Dutch squad at the 2014 FIFA World Cup. The club subsequently played a friendly game away at Emmen that resulted in a 2–0 win. They were supposed to play Fortuna Sittard in Echt-Susteren on 19 July, that game got banned in that municipality and was played behind closed doors in Rotterdam, resulting in a Feyenoord win. The last pre-season friendly ended in a 1–1 draw at home against Spanish side Real Sociedad; Mitchell te Vrede scored the lone Feyenoord goal. Before the game, a moment of silence commenced to remember the victims of Malaysia Airlines Flight 17. Stefan de Vrij, the best defender of the 2010 FIFA World Cup, was transferred to Lazio at the end of July, marking the fourth high-profile sale of a Feyenoord player this transfer window.

=== Summer ===
Feyenoord's second place in the previous season qualified them for the third qualifying round of the 2014–15 Champions League. They were drawn against Beşiktaş, who finished third in the 2013–14 Süper Lig. Feyenoord lost the first leg of the two-legged tie 1–2 at home on 30 July; Te Vrede converted a stoppage time penalty kick for the single Feyenoord goal. The club obtained two new players the next day, although they cannot play yet in the return against Beşiktaş. Luke Wilkshire came from Dynamo Moscow without transfer fee and Bilal Başaçikoğlu was obtained from Heerenveen for three and a half million euros.

The club played their return against Beşiktaş on 6 August without their new players and lost 3–1 in Istanbul, after Manu equalized the game with 16 minutes left to play. This loss knocked them out of the Champions league and into the play-off round of the 2014–15 Europa League, in which they were drawn against Ukrainian side Zorya Luhansk. Due to the War in Donbas fought in the clubs' hometown of Luhansk – the city is 100 km (62 mi) from the Malaysia Airlines Flight 17 crash site – Feyenoord's away game was not played at Avanhard Stadium, Zorya Luhansk's home grounds. Feyenoord opened their league campaign on the road against ADO Den Haag, they won this game 1–0 after a stoppage time goal by Te Vrede. On 15 August, Feyenoord announced they loaned forward Colin Kazim-Richards from Bursaspor for one season; the player did not yet play that evening when Feyenoord faced Heerenveen at home. This game saw two goals in three minutes, one by each team, and ended as a 1–1 draw after Te Vrede's equalizer levelled the score in the second half. Feyenoord's away game against Zorya Luhansk was played in Kyiv on 21 August, both teams scored in the first half; Luhansk got the first goal and Te Vrede equalized ten minutes later. The second half remained scoreless, the game ended in a one-all draw. The following Sunday, Feyenoord last their first game, it ended as 1–2 at home against Utrecht despite a first half lead from a Te Vrede goal. The next day Feyenoord announced they acquired midfielder Jens Toornstra from Utrecht for four years; he did not play against Feyenoord on his last day at Utrecht. Feyenoord secured their first European group stage appearance since 2008 on 28 August in a seven-goal home game against Luhansk. Feyenoord went up 2–0 at half time after goals by Te Vrede and Schaken. A Luhansk own goal led them to a comfortable 3–0 lead before conceding three successive goals brought them on the verge of elimination. Manu scored two minutes into stoppage time to give Feyenoord the 4–3 game win and 5–4 aggregate score that qualified them for the group stage of the Europa League. The next day the groups stage draw was held, placing Feyenoord with the Spanish title holder Sevilla, Belgian side Standard Liège and Croatian HNK Rijeka. On 31 August, Feyenoord sold midfielder Ruud Vormer to Club Brugge. Feyenoord ended August on the 31st with a scoreless away draw at Twente.

The club bought midfielder Karim El Ahmadi back from Aston Villa on 1 September, El Ahmadi played four seasons for Feyenoord before transferring to Aston Villa in 2012. Feyenoord acquired goalkeeper Kenneth Vermeer the same day from arch rival Ajax; Vermeer obtained four caps in the Netherlands national team prior to his arrival at Feyenoord. After an international break, Feyenoord played Willem II at home. Despite a late Kazim-Richards goal, Feyenoord lost 2–1, which led to a season-worst 14th position with five points from five games. Feyenoord opened their Europa League group stage with an away game against Sevilla on 18 September. The game resulted in a 2–0 loss with both goals coming from set pieces in the first half.

=== Fall ===
Feyenoord played De Klassieker at home on 21 September. They lost the game 1–0 after an early goal and dropped to the 15th position in the league table with 5 points from 6 matches. The club was knocked out of the 2014–15 KNVB Cup in the second round by Go Ahead Eagles the following Wednesday. They played the Eagles again in Deventer three days later, this time for a league match. They avenged their early cup exit by winning 4–0 with two goals a half; one was an Eagles own goal, Toornstra, Kazim-Richards and Te Vrede scored one each to reach this score line.

They played their second Europa League group game on 2 October against Standard Liège. Feyenoord scored first with a header of Van Beek shortly after half time. Standard equalized halfway through the second half before Manu's deciding goal shortly before the end of the game gave Feyenoord a 2–1 win. They had a second straight 4–0 league win, this time at home against groningen, the following Sunday with goals by four different players. Feyenoord climbed to the top half of the table on 18 October when they beat Heracles Almelo 2–1 at home after two goals by Manu. They played Rijeka away in the Europa League on 23 October, a game they lost 3–1, with all goals coming after half time. This placed them last in the group, two points from the leaders, at the half-way mark of the group matches. Feyenoord climbed to third place in the league table on 26 October with their fourth straight league win. They beat Cambuur 1–0 on the road with a first half Toornstra goal.

Feyenoord beat KNVB Cup holders PEC Zwolle, who had the same number of points going into the game, 2–0 at home on 1 November after second-half goals by both Van Beek and Boëtius. The following Thursday, Feyenoord played Rijeka at home. They arrived at the final 2–0 score quickly after an eight-minute goal by El Ahmadi and a 20th-minute header by Immers. The win led the club to the second place in the group with two matches left to play. Feyenoord played away at Vitesse Arnhem on 9 November, a game that ended in a scoreless draw. They played FC Dordrecht at home on 22 November. The game remained scoreless until deep in the second half when Toornstra and Schaken both scored to claim a 2–0 victory. They played their fifth Europa League group match at home against title holder Sevilla on 27 November. No goals were scored in the first half; 10 minutes into the second half Toornstra scored to give Feyenoord the lead, El Ahmadi doubled the score line shortly before full-time. The 2–0 win put them in first place in the group and secured their position in the knockout phase of the tournament.

Feyenoord played an away derby against Excelsior on 6 December. They won 5–2 after a pair of goals from Immers and additional scores by Kazim-Richards, Boëtius and Toornstra; Van Beek scored an own goal to add to Excelsior's total. They clinched first place in their Europa League group on 11 December by winning 3–0 in Liège against Standard, the win ended a ten-game drought without a win in European away games. Toornstra opened the score in the first half with a free kick; after half time Boëtius and Manu added to the score. They ended group play with four wins and two losses. As group winners they were seeded in the draw for the knockout phase. Sunday 14 December the club played AZ at home, Feyenoord outplayed AZ in the first half, but conceded two. They fought their way to a two-all draw in the second half with an early goal by Kazim-Richards and a stoppage time strike by Clasie. The next day, the round of 32 fixtures were drawn for the Europa League; Feyenoord was matched to Italian side Roma, Serie A runners-up in 2013–14. On 17 December Feyenoord played away against PSV; they lost the game 4–3 despite goals by Manu, El Ahmadi and Kazim-Richards.

=== Winter ===
Feyenoord played their last game of 2014 away at NAC Breda, a game they won due to a lone goal by Kazim-Richards in the first half. The winter break started after this game; Feyenoord had won nine out of 17 games, while drawing four and losing four, to claim third place at the halfway mark, 12 points behind the league leaders. The last day of the year the club announced they loaned Matthew Steenvoorden to FC Dordrecht for the rest of the season.

Several days into 2015, Ruben Schaken left the club before signing at Inter Baku. The club then went on a winter training camp in Dubai to prepare for the second half of the season. Feyenoord resumed play after the winter break with a home game against FC Twente on 18 January. Feyenoord won the game by a 3–1 margin after a first half goal by Immers and second half goals by Toornstra and Boëtius. The next Sunday, Feyenoord played De Klassieker away. The game ended in a scoreless draw, the first since 1978.

Feyenoord hosted ADO Den Haag on 1 February, a game that ended in a 2–1 win for Feyenoord with both goals coming in the first half. Feyenoord lost the following Wednesday 3–1 away at Heerenveen, despite Kazim-Richards scoring the first goal of the match. They got all three points the next Sunday after beating Cambuur 2–1 at home on 8 February due to El Ahmadi and Kazim-Richards goals just before and just after half time. Feyenoord dropped their second game of February the following Sunday with a 2–0 loss away at Heracles Almelo. Feyenoord played Roma in Rome on 19 February in the first leg of their round of 32 Europa League match-up. The game ended in a one-all draw, with Kazim-Richards scoring in the second half for Feyenoord. The following Sunday, they hosted Excelsior, also from Rotterdam, in De Kuip. Although they conceded twice before half time, Kazim-Richards, Toornstra and Immers scored after the break to give Feyenoord a 3–2 win.

Feyenoord played on 1 March; the game ended as a scoreless away draw against Utrecht. The lost point saw them drop to fourth place in the league standings. They regained the third league position the following week with a 3–0 home win over NAC Breda when Immers scored one and Te Vrede two goals. Feyenoord played their last game of the winter on 15 March away at FC Dordrecht. They won 2–1 because, with Achahbar scoring the winning goal in second half stoppage time.

=== Spring ===
Feyenoord took their winning streak into the spring. The team won their third straight game on 22 March at home against PSV by a 2–1 margin after two Achahbar goals two minutes apart.

Feyenoord further solidified their third position on 5 April when they visited fourth-placed AZ and beat them 4–1. Both teams got an own goal in the game, with Achabar (once) and Manu (twice) scoring in the right goal for Feyenoord. The following Sunday the club visited Willem II and drew the game 2–2 after goals by Manu and Kazim-Richards. On 19 April, Feyenoord hosted Go Ahead Eagles in their penultimate home game of the season. They lost 0–1 after conceding in the second half. Feyenoord played away at FC Groningen on 26 April; Clasie's first half goal led to a one-all draw.

Feyenoord played their penultimate league game of the season at home against Vitesse Arnhem on 11 May. They lost 4–1, keeping them in third position on goal differential going into the last matchday. Feyenoord lost their last league game of the season on 17 May away at PEC Zwolle 3–0. Feyenoord dropped to fourth place in the final standings, qualifying them for play-off games to clinch the last Dutch berth for the Europa League. They lost their semi-final game 3–2 on aggregate in the extra time of the second half against Heerenveen, which means they will not play European football in the 2015–16 season.

== Competitions ==
=== Overall ===
Competition	Round started	Final result	First match	Last match
Eredivisie	—	Fourth	10 August 2014	17 May 2015
European competition play-offs	Semi-finals	Semi-finals	21 May 2015	24 May 2015
KNVB Cup	Second round	Second round	24 September 2014	24 September 2014
UEFA Champions League	Third qualifying round	Third qualifying round	30 July 2014	6 August 2014
UEFA Europa League	Play-off round	Round of 32	21 August 2014	26 February 2015

Last updated: End of season. Source: Competitions

=== Eredivisie ===
==== League table ====
Pos	Team	Pld	W	D	L	GF	GA	GD	Pts	Qualification or relegation
2	Ajax	34	21	8	5	69	29	+40	71	Qualification for the Champions League third qualifying round
3	AZ	34	19	5	10	63	56	+7	62	Qualification for the Europa League third qualifying round
4	Feyenoord	34	17	8	9	56	39	+17	59	Qualification for the European competition play-offs
5	Vitesse (O)	34	16	10	8	66	43	+23	58	Qualification for the European competition play-offs
6	PEC Zwolle	34	16	5	13	59	43	+16	53	Qualification for the European competition play-offs

Source: NUsport
Rules for classification: 1) points; 2) goal difference; 3) number of goals scored
(O) Play-off winners

==== Results summary ====
Overall								Home						Away					
Pld	W	D	L	GF	GA	GD	Pts	W	D	L	GF	GA	GD	W	D	L	GF	GA	GD
34	17	8	9	56	39	+17	59	10	2	5	31	20	+11	7	6	4	25	19	+6

Source: Matches

==== League matches ====
10 August 2014 1	ADO Den Haag	0 – 1	Feyenoord	The Hague
		Report	Te Vrede 90+1'	Stadium: Kyocera Stadion; Attendance: 11,716; Referee: Makkelie

15 August 2014 2	Feyenoord	1 – 1	Heerenveen	Rotterdam
	Te Vrede 70'	Report	Ziyech 67'	Stadium: De Kuip; Attendance: 42,500; Referee: Liesveld

24 August 2014 3 (Note: Feyenoord–Utrecht was rescheduled from 23 August to 24 August 2014, because of Feyenoord's 21 August game in the play-off round of the UEFA Europa League.)	Feyenoord	1 – 2	Utrecht	Rotterdam
	Te Vrede 33'	Report	Barazite 45+1'; Antwi 72'	Stadium: De Kuip; Attendance: 42,500; Referee: Blom

31 August 2014 4	Twente	0 – 0	Feyenoord	Enschede
		Report		Stadium: De Grolsch Veste; Attendance: 28,900; Referee: Liesveld

13 September 2014 5	Feyenoord	1 – 2	Willem II	Rotterdam
	Kazim-Richards 75'	Report	Van der Struijk 8'; Armenteros 23'	Stadium: De Kuip; Attendance: 43,627; Referee: Braamhaar

21 September 2014 6	Feyenoord	0 – 1	Ajax	Rotterdam
		Report	Van Rhijn 4'	Stadium: De Kuip; Attendance: 47,000; Referee: Blom

27 September 2014 7	Go Ahead Eagles	0 – 4	Feyenoord	Deventer
		Report	Wijnaldum 28' (o.g.); Toornstra 41'; Kazim-Richards 58'; Te Vrede 89'	Stadium: De Adelaarshorst; Attendance: 7,978; Referee: Kuipers

5 October 2014 8	Feyenoord	4 – 0	Groningen	Rotterdam
	Kazim-Richards 24'; Immers 58'; Boëtius 84'; Te Vrede 89'	Report		Stadium: De Kuip; Attendance: 44,000; Referee: Van Sichem

18 October 2014 9	Feyenoord	2 – 1	Heracles Almelo	Rotterdam
	Manu 12', 19'	Report	Veldmate 63' (pen.)	Stadium: De Kuip; Attendance: 44,500; Referee: Makkelie

26 October 2014 10	Cambuur	0 – 1	Feyenoord	Leeuwarden
		Report	Toornstra 37'	Stadium: Cambuur Stadion; Attendance: 10,000; Referee: Braamhaar

1 November 2014 11	Feyenoord	2 – 0	PEC Zwolle	Rotterdam
	Van Beek 50'; Boëtius 62'	Report		Stadium: De Kuip; Attendance: 47,500; Referee: Vink

9 November 2014 12	Vitesse Arnhem	0 – 0	Feyenoord	Arnhem
		Report		Stadium: GelreDome; Attendance: 17,438; Referee: Gözübüyük

22 November 2014 13	Feyenoord	2 – 0	FC Dordrecht	Rotterdam
	Toornstra 86'; Schaken 90+4'	Report		Stadium: De Kuip; Attendance: 45,000; Referee: Wiedemeijer

6 December 2014 15	Excelsior	2 – 5	Feyenoord	Rotterdam
	Stans 51'; Van Beek 86' (o.g.)	Report	Kazim-Richards 6'; Boëtius 17'; Immers 26', 62'; Toornstra 57'	Stadium: Stadion Woudestein; Attendance: 3,600; Referee: Van Boekel

14 December 2014 16 (Note: Feyenoord–AZ was rescheduled from 13 December to 14 December 2014, because of Feyenoord's game on 11 December in the group stage of the UEFA Europa League.)	Feyenoord	2 – 2	AZ	Rotterdam
	Kazim-Richards 53'; Clasie 90+3'	Report	Hoedt 25'; Tanković 30'	Stadium: De Kuip; Attendance: 47,500; Referee: Gözübüyük

17 December 2014 14 (Note: PSV–Feyenoord was initially rescheduled from 30 November to 2 December 2014. The KNVB moved the PSV–Feyenoord game, because their regulations require at least two days off between matches. This would not have occurred otherwise, because the Europa League game Estoril–PSV was abandoned at half time and finished 28 November. This game was postponed again, because the NS could not provide sufficient trains for fan transportation on 2 December. The game rescheduled to 17 December to ensure it would be played before the winter break.)	PSV	4 – 3	Feyenoord	Eindhoven
	De Jong 22', 60', 63'; Depay 90+3'	Report	Manu 13'; El Ahmadi 42'; Kazim-Richards 89'	Stadium: Philips Stadion; Attendance: 35,000; Referee: Kuipers

21 December 2014 17	NAC Breda	0 – 1	Feyenoord	Breda
		Report	Kazim-Richards 32'	Stadium: Rat Verlegh Stadion; Attendance: 18,500; Referee: Blom

18 January 2015 18	Feyenoord	3 – 1	Twente	Rotterdam
	Immers 37'; Toornstra 59'; Boëtius 62'	Report	Engelaar 51'	Stadium: De Kuip; Attendance: 46,000; Referee: Van Boekel

25 January 2015 19	Ajax	0 – 0	Feyenoord	Amsterdam
		Report		Stadium: Amsterdam Arena; Attendance: 52,472; Referee: Nijhuis

1 February 2015 20	Feyenoord	2 – 1	ADO Den Haag	Rotterdam
	Immers 10'; Derijck 20' (o.g.)	Report	Van Duinen 48'	Stadium: De Kuip; Attendance: 46,500; Referee: Wiedemeijer

4 February 2015 21	Heerenveen	3 – 1	Feyenoord	Heerenveen
	Thern 43'; Larsson 58', 77'	Report	Kazim-Richards 29'	Stadium: Abe Lenstra Stadion; Attendance: 25,155; Referee: Liesveld

8 February 2015 22	Feyenoord	2 – 1	Cambuur	Rotterdam
	El Ahmadi 43'; Kazim-Richards 47'	Report	Barto 62'	Stadium: De Kuip; Attendance: 45,000; Referee: Blom

14 February 2015 23	Heracles Almelo	2 – 0	Feyenoord	Almelo
	Linssen 45+2'; Bruns 85'	Report		Stadium: Polman Stadion; Attendance: 8,312; Referee: Van Boekel

22 February 2015 24	Feyenoord	3 – 2	Excelsior	Rotterdam
	Kazim-Richards 50' (pen.); Toornstra 77'; Immers 79'	Report	Van Weert 7', 30'	Stadium: De Kuip; Attendance: 45,500; Referee: Gözübüyük

1 March 2015 25	Utrecht	0 – 0	Feyenoord	Utrecht
		Report		Stadium: Stadion Galgenwaard; Attendance: 18,030; Referee: Kuipers

8 March 2015 26	Feyenoord	3 – 0	NAC Breda	Rotterdam
	Immers 10'; Te Vrede 62', 75'	Report		Stadium: De Kuip; Attendance: 44,000; Referee: Vink

15 March 2015 27	FC Dordrecht	1 – 2	Feyenoord	Dordrecht
	Fortes 62'	Report	Manu 19'; Achahbar 90+2'	Stadium: Riwal Hoogwerkers Stadion; Attendance: 4,088; Referee: Liesveld

22 March 2015 28	Feyenoord	2 – 1	PSV	Rotterdam
	Achahbar 59', 63'	Report	Depay 68'	Stadium: De Kuip; Attendance: 45,000; Referee: Van Boekel

5 April 2015 29	AZ	1 – 4	Feyenoord	Alkmaar
	Van Beek 87' (o.g.)	Report	Luckassen 3' (o.g.); Achahbar 40'; Manu 45', 59'	Stadium: AFAS Stadion; Attendance: 16,503; Referee: Kuipers

12 April 2015 30	Willem II	2 – 2	Feyenoord	Tilburg
	Heerkens 37'; Andrade 74'	Report	Manu 30'; Kazim-Richards 82'	Stadium: Koning Willem II Stadion; Attendance: 14,400; Referee: Braamhaar

19 April 2015 31	Feyenoord	0 – 1	Go Ahead Eagles	Rotterdam
		Report	Reimerink 71'	Stadium: De Kuip; Attendance: 47,000; Referee: Blom

26 April 2015 32	Groningen	1 – 1	Feyenoord	Groningen
	Chery 44'	Report	Clasie 26'	Stadium: Euroborg; Attendance: 21,815; Referee: Higler

11 May 2015 33 (Note: Feyenoord-Vitesse was rescheduled from 10 May to 11 May, because of a police strike on 10 May.)	Feyenoord	1 – 4	Vitesse Arnhem	Rotterdam
	Toornstra 38'	Report	Kazaishvili 12'; Van der Heijden 31'; Achenteh 43'; Labyad 90+1'	Stadium: De Kuip; Attendance: 46,500; Referee: Kuipers

17 May 2015 34	PEC Zwolle	3 – 0	Feyenoord	Zwolle
	Rienstra 52'; Necid 72' (pen.), 90+1'	Report		Stadium: IJsseldelta Stadion; Attendance: 12,420; Referee: Nijhuis

Source: Royal Dutch Football Association

==== European competition play-offs ====
Four teams play for a spot in the 2015–16 UEFA Europa League third qualifying round.

21 May 2015 Semi-final first leg	Heerenveen	1 – 0	Feyenoord	Heerenveen
	Thern 83'	Report		Stadium: Abe Lenstra Stadion; Attendance: 15,123; Referee: Makkelie

24 May 2015 Semi-final second leg	Feyenoord	2 – 2 (a.e.t.) (2 – 3 agg.)	Heerenveen	Rotterdam
	Achahbar 41'; Kazim-Richards 110'	Report	Uth 100', 105'	Stadium: De Kuip; Attendance: 38,000; Referee: Blom

=== KNVB Cup ===
24 September 2014 Second round	Go Ahead Eagles	2 – 0	Feyenoord	Deventer
	Reimerink 2'; Van der Linden 76'	Report		Stadium: De Adelaarshorst; Attendance: 6,478; Referee: Nijhuis

=== Champions League ===
==== Third qualifying round ====
30 July 2014 First leg	Feyenoord (Netherlands)	1 – 2	(Turkey) Beşiktaş	Rotterdam, Netherlands
	Te Vrede 90+5' (pen.)	Report	Pektemek 13'; Koyunlu 71'	Stadium: De Kuip; Attendance: 50,000; Referee: Luca Banti

6 August 2014 Second leg	Beşiktaş (Turkey)	3 – 1 (5 – 2 agg.)	(Netherlands) Feyenoord	Istanbul, Turkey
	Ba 28', 80', 86'	Report	Manu 74'	Stadium: Atatürk Olympic Stadium; Attendance: 45,000; Referee: Zwayer

=== Europa League ===
==== Play-off round ====
21 August 2014 First leg	Zorya Luhansk (Ukraine)	1 – 1	(Netherlands) Feyenoord	Kyiv, Ukraine
	Bilyi 27'	Report	Te Vrede 38'	Stadium: Valeriy Lobanovskyi Dynamo Stadium; Attendance: 3,700; Referee: Gil

28 August 2014 Second leg	Feyenoord (Netherlands)	4 – 3 (5 – 4 agg.)	(Ukraine) Zorya Luhansk	Rotterdam, Netherlands
	Te Vrede 18'; Schaken 26'; Bilyi 48' (o.g.); Manu 90+2'	Report	Malinovskyi 56', 80'; Bilyi 71'	Stadium: De Kuip; Attendance: 42,500; Referee: Hansen

==== Group stage ====
===== Group G table =====
Pos	Team	Pld	W	D	L	GF	GA	GD	Pts	Qualification	FEY	SEV	RIJ	STA
1	(Netherlands) Feyenoord	6	4	0	2	10	6	+4	12	Advance to knockout phase	—	2–0	2–0	2–1
2	(Spain) Sevilla	6	3	2	1	8	5	+3	11	Advance to knockout phase	2–0	—	1–0	3–1
3	(Croatia) Rijeka	6	2	1	3	7	8	−1	7		3–1	2–2	—	2–0
4	(Belgium) Standard Liège	6	1	1	4	4	10	−6	4		0–3	0–0	2–0	—

Source: Soccerway
Rules for classification: Group stage tiebreakers

===== Group matches =====
18 September 2014 Matchday 1	Sevilla (Spain)	2 – 0	(Netherlands) Feyenoord	Seville, Spain
	Krychowiak 8'; Mbia 31'	Report		Stadium: Ramón Sánchez Pizjuán Stadium; Attendance: 27,604; Referee: Buquet

2 October 2014 Matchday 2	Feyenoord (Netherlands)	2 – 1	(Belgium) Standard Liège	Rotterdam, Netherlands
	Van Beek 47'; Manu 84'	Report	Viera 65'	Stadium: De Kuip; Attendance: 33,000; Referee: Sousa

23 October 2014 Matchday 3	Rijeka (Croatia)	3 – 1	(Netherlands) Feyenoord	Rijeka, Croatia
	Kramarić 63', 71', 76' (pen.)	Report	Toornstra 66'	Stadium: Stadion Kantrida; Attendance: 9,326; Referee: Hagen

6 November 2014 Matchday 4	Feyenoord (Netherlands)	2 – 0	(Croatia) Rijeka	Rotterdam, Netherlands
	El Ahmadi 9'; Immers 20'	Report		Stadium: De Kuip; Attendance: 30,000; Referee: Thomson

27 November 2014 Matchday 5	Feyenoord (Netherlands)	2 – 0	(Spain) Sevilla	Rotterdam, Netherlands
	Toornstra 56'; El Ahmadi 83'	Report		Stadium: De Kuip; Attendance: 38,000; Referee: Vinčić

11 December 2014 Matchday 6	Standard Liège (Belgium)	0 – 3	(Netherlands) Feyenoord	Liège, Belgium
		Report	Toornstra 16'; Boëtius 60'; Manu 88'	Stadium: Stade Maurice Dufrasne; Attendance: 11,913; Referee: Yefet

==== Knockout phase ====
===== Round of 32 =====
19 February 2015 First leg	Roma (Italy)	1 – 1	(Netherlands) Feyenoord	Rome, Italy
	Gervinho 22'	Report	Kazim-Richards 55'	Stadium: Stadio Olimpico; Attendance: 29,292; Referee: Hațegan

26 February 2015 Second leg	Feyenoord (Netherlands)	1 – 2 (2 – 3 agg.)	(Italy) Roma	Rotterdam, Netherlands
	Manu 57'	Report	Ljajić 45+2'; Gervinho 60'	Stadium: De Kuip; Attendance: 45,000; Referee: Turpin

=== Friendlies ===
28 June 2014	SV Honselersdijk	0 – 8	Feyenoord	Westland
		Report	Immers 10', 34'; Schaken 12'; Sleegers 52'; Te Vrede 57', 74'; Karsdorp 62'; Achahbar 88'	Stadium: Sportpark De Strijphorst; Referee: Van Elswijk

4 July 2014	VOC	0 – 1	Feyenoord	Rotterdam
		Report	Vormer 30'	Stadium: Sportpark VOC; Attendance: 3,000; Referee: Luinge

8 July 2014	FC Horst	0 – 8	Feyenoord	Ermelo
		Report	Vilhena 5'; Pellè 15', 32'; Vormer 35' (pen.); Te Vrede 61', 77'; Dammers 67', 68'	Stadium: Sportpark de Adelaar; Referee: Van Beek

11 July 2014	ASWH	1 – 6	Feyenoord	Hendrik-Ido-Ambacht
	Pot 85'	Report	Boëtius 5', 11' (pen.); Te Vrede 38', 60'; Goossens 79'; Manu 90'	Stadium: Sportpark Schildman; Referee: Blom

16 July 2014	Emmen	0 – 2	Feyenoord	Emmen
		Report	Achahbar 29'; Te Vrede 82'	Stadium: JenS Vesting; Referee: Mulder

19 July 2014 (Note: This game was banned as originally planned, because the mayor of Echt-Susteren feared hooliganism. The location was subsequently changed and the game was played in its new location the same day.)	Fortuna Sittard	Cancelled	Feyenoord	Susteren
				Stadium: Sportpark Suëstra

19 July 2014	Feyenoord	1 – 0	Fortuna Sittard	Rotterdam
	Manu 79'	Report		Stadium: Sportcomplex Varkenoord; Attendance: Closed to spectators

23 July 2014	Feyenoord	1 – 1	Real Sociedad	Rotterdam
	Te Vrede 40'	Report	Prieto 9'	Stadium: De Kuip; Referee: Wiedemeijer

4 September 2014	Feyenoord	2 – 0	Volendam	Rotterdam
	Manu 25' (pen.); Toornstra 71'	Report		Stadium: Sportcomplex Varkenoord; Attendance: Closed to spectators Referee: Martens

4 January 2015	Feyenoord	2 – 1	Emmen	Rotterdam
	Boëtius 24'; Kazim-Richards 27'	Report	Tarvajärvi 82'	Stadium: De Kuip; Referee: Manschot

8 January 2015	Feyenoord	1 – 1	Bunyodkor	Nad Al Sheba
	Vilhena 64'	Report	Urinboev 44'	Stadium: Nad Al Sheba sport complex Referee: Al Balushi

== Player details ==
No.	Pos	Nat	Player	Total		Eredivisie (Note: Main competition + play-offs)		KNVB Cup		Champions League		Europa League (Note: Qualifying phase + tournament phase)	
No.	Pos	Nat	Player	Apps	Goals	Apps	Goals	Apps	Goals	Apps	Goals	Apps	Goals
1	GK	(Netherlands) NED	Erwin Mulder	9	0	4+0	0+0	0	0	2	0	2+1	0+0
2	DF	(Australia) AUS	Luke Wilkshire	27	0	16+2	0+0	1	0	0	0	2+6	0+0
4	DF	(Netherlands) NED	Joris Mathijsen	13	0	8+0	0+0	0	0	2	0	2+1	0+0
5	DF	(Netherlands) NED	Terence Kongolo	45	0	31+2	0+0	1	0	2	0	2+7	0+0
6	MF	(Netherlands) NED	Jordy Clasie	46	2	31+2	2+0	1	0	2	0	2+8	0+0
7	FW	(Netherlands) NED	Jean-Paul Boëtius	42	5	31+2	4+0	1	0	2	0	1+5	0+1
8 (Note: Vormer played four games with number 8 before being traded to Club Brugge. The next day El Ahmadi was acquired from Aston Villa and received number 8 as well. They did not play for Feyenoord at the same time in the 2014–15 season.)	MF	(Netherlands) NED	Ruud Vormer	4	0	2+0	0+0	0	0	1	0	1+0	0+0
8	MF	(Morocco) MAR	Karim El Ahmadi	38	4	29+2	2+0	0	0	0	0	0+7	0+2
10	MF	(Netherlands) NED	Lex Immers	40	8	30+0	7+0	0	0	2	0	2+6	0+1
11	FW	(Netherlands) NED	Wesley Verhoek	1	0	0+0	0+0	0	0	1	0	0+0	0+0
13	GK	(Netherlands) NED	Ronald Graafland	0	0	0+0	0+0	0	0	0	0	0+0	0+0
14	FW	(Netherlands) NED	Bilal Başaçikoğlu	18	0	11+2	0+0	1	0	0	0	2+2	0+0
15	FW	(Turkey) TUR	Colin Kazim-Richards	37	13	27+2	11+1	1	0	0	0	0+7	0+1
16	GK	(Netherlands) NED	Kenneth Vermeer	41	0	30+2	0+0	1	0	0	0	0+8	0+0
17	FW	(Netherlands) NED	Elvis Manu	37	12	26+1	7+0	1	0	2	1	1+6	1+3
18	DF	(Netherlands) NED	Miquel Nelom	42	0	30+2	0+0	1	0	1	0	1+7	0+0
19	FW	(Netherlands) NED	Mitchell te Vrede	28	10	20+0	7+0	1	0	2	1	2+3	2+0
21	MF	(Netherlands) NED	Tonny Vilhena	31	0	21+0	0+0	1	0	2	0	2+5	0+0
22	DF	(Netherlands) NED	Sven van Beek	44	2	31+2	1+0	1	0	2	0	2+6	0+1
23	DF	(Netherlands) NED	Khalid Boulahrouz	18	0	12+0	0+0	0	0	1	0	0+5	0+0
24	DF	(Netherlands) NED	Matthew Steenvoorden	2	0	1+0	0+0	0	0	0	0	0+1	0+0
25	DF	(Netherlands) NED	Lucas Woudenberg	3	0	2+0	0+0	0	0	0	0	0+1	0+0
26	MF	(Netherlands) NED	Rick Karsdorp	25	0	19+1	0+0	0	0	1	0	1+3	0+0
27	FW	(Netherlands) NED	Ruben Schaken	12	1	6+0	0+0	1	0	2	0	2+1	1+0
28	MF	(Netherlands) NED	Jens Toornstra	40	10	29+2	7+0	1	0	0	0	0+8	0+3
29	FW	(Netherlands) NED	Anass Achahbar	16	5	12+2	4+1	0	0	0	0	1+1	0+0
31	FW	(Netherlands) NED	Wessel Dammers	1	0	0+0	0+0	0	0	0	0	0+1	0+0
32	DF	(Netherlands) NED	Rodney Lopes Cabral	0	0	0+0	0+0	0	0	0	0	0+0	0+0
34	DF	(Netherlands) NED	Calvin Verdonk	1	0	1+0	0+0	0	0	0	0	0+0	0+0

Sources: Squad numbers, Eredivisie stats, Champions League statistics, Europa League statistics

== Transfers ==
=== In ===
Date	Name	From	Fee	Ref
1 July 2014	(Netherlands) Warner Hahn	FC Dordrecht	Free	
1 July 2014	(Netherlands) Stef Gronsveld	Youth Academy	Free	
1 July 2014	(Netherlands) Jari Schuurman	Youth Academy	Free	
1 July 2014	(Netherlands) Gustavo Hamer	Youth Academy	Free	
1 July 2014	(Netherlands) Bart Nieuwkoop	Youth Academy	Free	
1 July 2014	(Netherlands) Shurendo Janga	Youth Academy	Free	
4 July 2014	(Netherlands) Rashaan Fernandes	Youth Academy	Free	
14 July 2014	(Netherlands) Khalid Boulahrouz	Brøndby	Free	
31 July 2014	(Australia) Luke Wilkshire	Dynamo Moscow	Free	
31 July 2014	(Netherlands) Bilal Başaçikoğlu	Heerenveen	€3,500,000	
25 August 2014	(Netherlands) Jens Toornstra	Utrecht	€3,500,000	
1 September 2014	(Morocco) Karim El Ahmadi	Aston Villa	€700,000	
1 September 2014	(Netherlands) Kenneth Vermeer	Ajax	€1,000,000	

=== Out ===
Date	Name	To	Fee	Ref
1 July 2014	(Netherlands) Otman Bakkal	Unattached	Free	
1 July 2014	(Netherlands) Guyon Fernandez	NAC Breda	Free	
1 July 2014	(Netherlands) Jordy van Deelen	FC Dordrecht	Free	
1 July 2014	(Netherlands) Mats van Huijgevoort	Den Bosch	Free	
1 July 2014	(Netherlands) Boy de Jong	PEC Zwolle	Free	
1 July 2014	(Netherlands) Kaj Ramsteijn	Marítimo	Free	
12 July 2014	(Italy) Graziano Pellè	Southampton	€8,000,000	
15 July 2014	(Netherlands) Daryl Janmaat	Newcastle United	€7,500,000	
15 July 2014	(Netherlands) Bruno Martins Indi	Porto	€7,500,000	
30 July 2014	(Netherlands) Stefan de Vrij	Lazio	€8,000,000	
27 August 2014	(Netherlands) John Goossens	Pune City	Free	
31 August 2014	(Netherlands) Ruud Vormer	Club Brugge	?	
5 January 2015	(Netherlands) Ruben Schaken	Inter Baku	Free	

=== Loans in ===
Date	Name	From	Fee	Ref
15 August 2014	(Turkey) Colin Kazim-Richards	Bursaspor	Loan	

=== Loans out ===
Date	Name	To	Fee	Ref
3 July 2014	(Greece) Kostas Lamprou	Willem II	Loan	
31 August 2014	(Netherlands) Warner Hahn	PEC Zwolle	Loan	
1 September 2014	(Netherlands) Joey Sleegers	FC Eindhoven	Loan	
31 December 2014	(Netherlands) Matthew Steenvoorden	FC Dordrecht	Loan	
22 January 2015	(Netherlands) Wesley Verhoek	Go Ahead Eagles	Loan	

== Club ==
=== Coaching staff ===
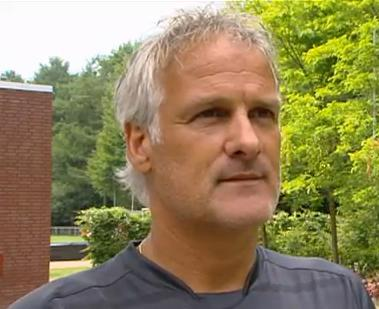
This is first season Fred Rutten manages Feyenoord.

Position	Staff
Manager	Fred Rutten
Assistant manager	Jean-Paul van Gastel
Assistant manager	Giovanni van Bronckhorst
Assistant manager	Patrick Greveraars
Goalkeeping coach	Patrick Lodewijks
Fitness coach	Arno Philips
Team manager	Bas van Noortwijk

Last updated: 25 August 2014
Source: Feyenoord

=== Kit ===
Supplier: Adidas
Sponsor(s): Opel

Home	Home alt.	Home alt. 2	Away	Away alt.	Goalkeeper 1	Goalkeeper 2

Last updated: 30 June 2014.
Source: Feyenoord
Feyenoord signed a four-year sponsorship contract with Opel in 2013. Opel will be the main sponsor, and appear on the kit, for the second consecutive season and the seventh season overall for the 2014–15 campaign. In September 2013, the club announced Adidas would return as kit supplier for Feyenoord for five years starting July 2014.
