= Mitchell te Vrede =

Surinamese footballer

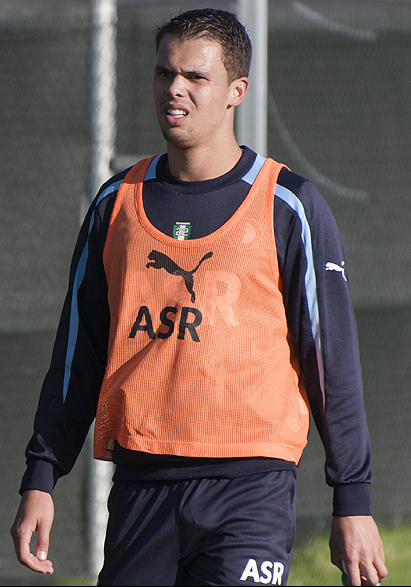
- Te Vrede with Feyenoord in 2014

Personal information
- Full name: Mitchell te Vrede
- Date of birth: 7 August 1991 (age 35)
- Place of birth: Amstelveen, Netherlands
- Height: 1.91 m (6 ft 3 in)
- Position: Forward

Youth career
- 1998–2008: AFC
- 2008–2011: AZ

Senior career*
Years	Team	Apps	(Gls)
2011–2012	Excelsior	19	(2)
2012–2015	Feyenoord	35	(11)
2015–2016	Heerenveen	28	(10)
2017	Boluspor	9	(0)
2018–2019	NAC Breda	41	(13)
2019–2021	Al-Fateh	48	(25)
2021–2022	Abha	28	(5)
2022–2023	Al Dhafra	10	(2)
2023	Hatta	26	(10)
2023–2024	Gol Gohar	8	(0)

International career^{‡}
2009	Netherlands U18	1	(0)
2021–	Suriname	6	(2)
- * Club domestic league appearances and goals as of 16:52, 22 January 2024 (UTC) ‡ National team caps and goals as of 16:52, 22 January 2024 (UTC)

Mitchell te Vrede (born 7 August 1991) is a professional footballer who plays as a striker for Persian Gulf Pro League club Gol Gohar. Born in the Netherlands, he plays for the Suriname national team.

He formerly played for Excelsior, Feyenoord, Heerenveen, Boluspor, NAC Breda, Al-Fateh, Abha, Al Dhafra and Hatta.

== Club career ==
Te Vrede started playing football for AFC in Amsterdam and joined the AZ youth academy in 2008. In the 2010–11 season, he was part of the first-team squad, but did not make his debut. In 2011 he signed a two-year deal with Excelsior.

He moved to Feyenoord ahead of the 2012–13 season, where he signed a two-year contract with an option for another two years. He mostly acted as a backup to starting striker Graziano Pellè during his time at the club. In 2014, the option was triggered by Feyenoord, keeping him at the club for another two years. He was a part of Feyenoord's successful 2014–15 UEFA Europa League campaign, where the club would become the group winner in that tournament, partly by winning 2–0 at home against defending title holders Sevilla, after goals from Jens Toornstra and Karim El Ahmadi, and winning 0–3 in the other match against Standard Liège. In the knockout phase, Feyenoord managed a 1–1 draw away against Roma. Feyenoord lost 1–2 at home, after Te Vrede was sent off.

In August 2015, Te Vrede signed a two-year contract with Heerenveen, with an option for an extra year. It was reported that the Frisian club paid around €500,000 to secure his services.

In January 2017, he exchanged Heerenveen for Turkish club Boluspor, where he signed a one-and-a-half-year contract. On 17 October 2017, it was announced that his contract with Boluspor had been terminated. In the winter break of the 2017–18 season, he signed with NAC Breda where he would compete for a starting position with loanee Sadiq Umar. In the 2018–19 season, he suffered relegation as a part of the NAC team. He afterwards signed with Saudi Arabian club Al-Fateh in June 2019.

On 11 August 2021, te Vrede joined Abha. On 30 July 2022, te Vrede joined Al Dhafra on a free transfer.

== International career ==
Born in the Netherlands, Te Vrede is of Surinamese descent. Te Vrede gained one cap for the Netherlands U18 team; a friendly against Turkey on 1 April 2009, where he came on as a substitute for Rick ten Voorde in the 65th minute in a 3–0 win.

In May 2021, it was announced that he was eligible for the Suriname national team, and would make himself available for a call-up from national team coach Dean Gorré. He debuted with the Suriname national team in a 6–0 2022 FIFA World Cup qualification win over Bermuda on 4 June 2021.

== Personal life ==
Various Turkish media reported on 3 April 2017 that Te Vrede was suffering from cancer. Later that evening, he responded to Dutch newspaper De Telegraaf that he had had a tumor in his testicle, but it had been surgically removed, as there had been no metastases yet.

== Career statistics ==
=== Club ===
As of match played 3 January 2024

Appearances and goals by club, season and competition
Club	Season	League			National Cup		Other		Total	
Club	Season	Division	Apps	Goals	Apps	Goals	Apps	Goals	Apps	Goals
Excelsior	2011–12	Eredivisie	19	2	2	1	0	0	21	3
Feyenoord	2012–13	Eredivisie	1	0	0	0	0	0	1	0
Feyenoord	2013–14	Eredivisie	14	4	1	1	0	0	15	5
Feyenoord	2014–15	Eredivisie	20	7	1	0	7 (Note: 2 appearances and 1 goal in UEFA Champions League, 5 appearances and 2 goals in UEFA Europa League)	3	28	10
Feyenoord	Total		35	11	2	1	7	3	44	15
Heerenveen	2015–16	Eredivisie	28	10	0	0	0	0	28	10
Boluspor	2016–17	TFF First League	5	0	2	1	0	0	7	1
Boluspor	2017–18	TFF First League	4	0	1	1	0	0	5	1
Boluspor	Total		9	0	3	1	0	0	12	2
NAC Breda	2017–18	Eredivisie	11	3	0	0	0	0	11	3
NAC Breda	2018–19	Eredivisie	30	10	1	0	0	0	31	10
NAC Breda	Total		41	13	1	0	0	0	42	13
Al Fateh	2019–20	Saudi Pro League	26	12	2	1	0	0	28	13
Al Fateh	2020–21	Saudi Pro League	22	13	3	0	0	0	25	13
Al Fateh	Total		48	25	5	1	0	0	53	26
Abha	2021–22	Saudi Pro League	28	5	1	0	0	0	29	5
Al Dhafra	2022–23	UAE Pro League	10	2	4	0	0	0	14	2
Gol Gohar Sirjan	2023–24	Persian Gulf Pro League	8	0	0	0	0	0	8	0
Career total			226	68	18	5	7	3	251	76

=== International ===
As of match played 12 September 2023

Appearances and goals by national team and year
National team	Year	Apps	Goals
Suriname	2021	2	0
Suriname	2022	1	1
Suriname	2023	3	1
Total		6	2

As of match played 8 September 2023
Suriname score listed first, score column indicates score after each te Vrede goal

List of international goals scored by Mitchell te Vrede
No.	Date	Venue	Cap	Opponent	Score	Result	Competition
1	22 September 2022	Yanmar Stadion, Almere, Netherlands	3	Nicaragua	1–0	2–1	Friendly
2	8 September 2023	Kirani James Athletic Stadium, St. George's, Grenada	5	Grenada	1–1	1–1	2023–24 CONCACAF Nations League
