= 2013–14 Feyenoord season =

Feyenoord
2013–14 season
- Chairman: Dick van Well
- Manager: Ronald Koeman
- Stadium: De Kuip
- Eredivisie: 2nd
- KNVB Cup: Quarter-final
- Europa League: Play-off round
- Top goalscorer: League: Graziano Pellè (23); All: Graziano Pellè (26)
- Highest home attendance: 47,500 (Multiple sell-out crowds)
- Lowest home attendance: 21,000 (vs HSV Hoek, 30 October 2013)
- Average home league attendance: 45,757
Home colours	Away colours	Third colours

The 2013–14 season was Feyenoord's 106th season of play, it marked its 58th season in the Eredivisie and its 92nd consecutive season in the top flight of Dutch football. They ended their league campaign as runners-up. They entered the KNVB Cup in the second round and reached the quarter-final. Their Europa League appearance consisted of the play-off round. It was the third straight season with manager Ronald Koeman, who did not renew his contract at the conclusion of the season.

The club had one of their worst season starts ever; they lost three straight in the league – reaching a season-worst 17th position after three rounds – and both their European appearances against FC Kuban Krasnodar. Because they only lost two more games in the first half of the season, they climbed to fourth place in the table at the halfway mark. They won three KNVB Cup games to eventually succumb to the eventual runners-up in the quarter-finals. The team ended the season on a high note with a seven-game winning streak before drawing the last game of the season. This led to a second-place finish in the 2013–14 Eredivisie, a place that qualified Feyenoord for the third qualifying round in the 2014–15 UEFA Champions League. Overall Feyenoord won 23 matches, drew 7 and lost 10 during the season. Graziano Pellè was the season topscorer with 26 goals, of which 23 occurred in the Eredivisie.

== Background ==
The 2013–14 season marked the third year of Ronald Koeman's tenure as manager at Feyenoord. In his first year Feyenoord finished second in the league table and in the 2012–13 season they took third place, which qualified the club for the play-off round of the Europa League in 2013–14. In January 2013 they signed Graziano Pellè for four years after he played for the club on loan for the 2012–13 season and after he ended the season as the club's top scorer.

== Review and events ==
=== Pre-season ===
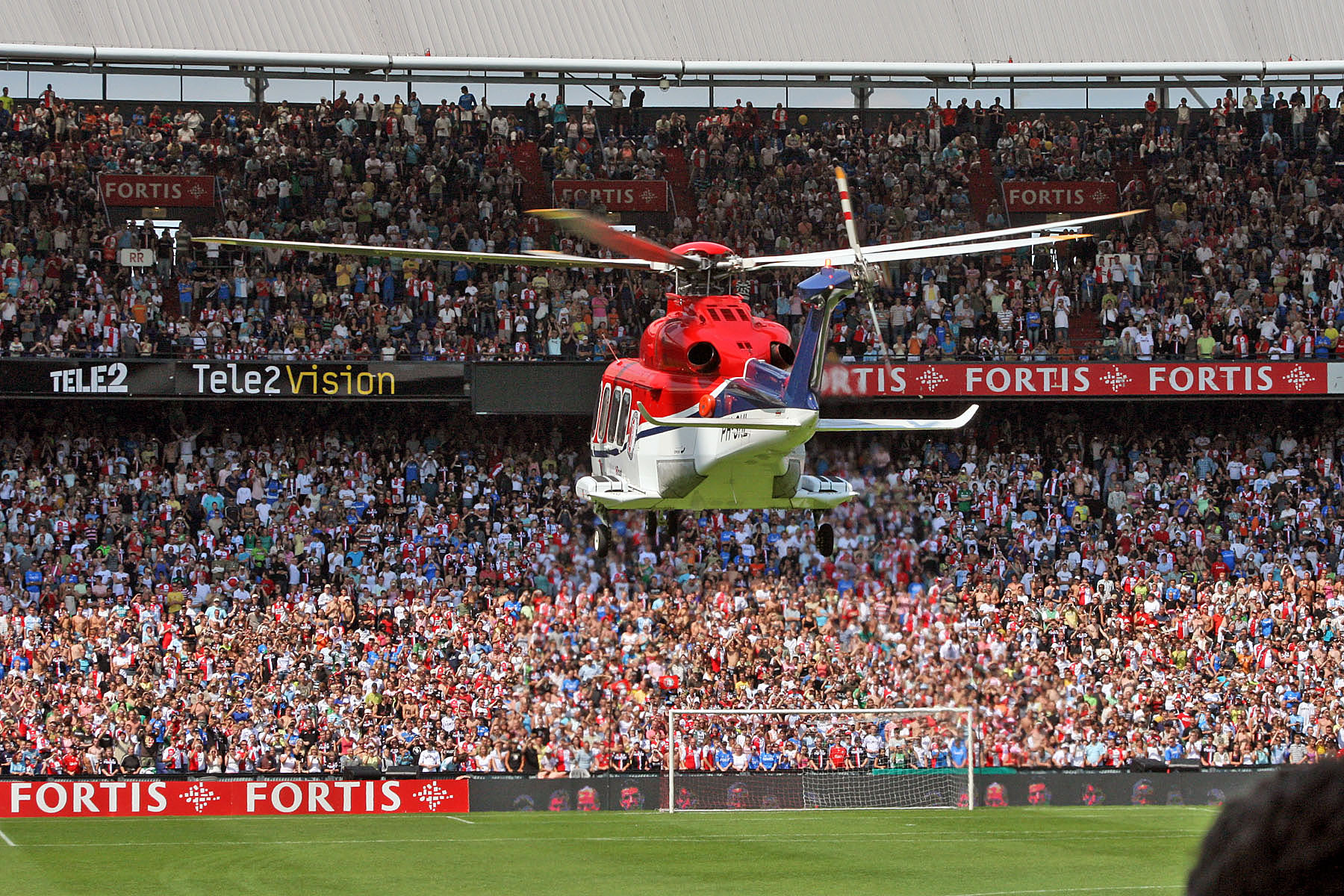
New players are traditionally flown into De Kuip per helicopter during the open day. This season Steenvoorden, Manu, Sleegers and Van Deelen arrived this way.

Feyenoord had its first training session in the Kuip on 26 June 2013 in front of 5,000 fans. In the first half of July they played and won four friendly games against amateur sides. Feyenoord played Eerste Divisie side FC Dordrecht to close out their Dutch summer friendlies and drew the game away in Dordrecht. On 21 July Feyenoord had its annual Open Dag (Open Day) which was visited by 40,000 fans. Four new players were flown into the Kuip per helicopter and the full team was officially presented to the fans. Feyenoord then went on a training camp in Levico Terme and played the Italian side Hellas Verona there, a game that ended in a defeat. Feyenoord ended the pre-season preparation with a 3–1 home win over Getafe.

=== August–October ===
Feyenoord started the 2013–14 Eredivisie campaign on the road against PEC Zwolle on 4 August 2013 with a stoppage time loss. Later that week Feyenoord was drawn against European debutant FC Kuban Krasnodar from Russia for the play-off round of the Europa league. They finished their home opener on 11 August with nine men, which resulted in a three-goal loss against FC Twente. Later that week the club announced it had loaned forward Samuel Armenteros for one season from Anderlecht. The following Sunday they played De Klassieker away and lost by one goal after an early lead. Feyenoord opened their European season 22 August 2013 in Russia and lost to FC Kuban Krasnodar, with Ibrahima Baldé scoring the only goal of the match. Feyenoord won their second home game of the season 25 August against NAC, due to a hattrick by Graziano Pellè of which two goals were scored in two consecutive minutes. The second leg of the Europa League play-off round was played 29 August at home in De Kuip, where they lost 1–2 and were eliminated from the tournament.

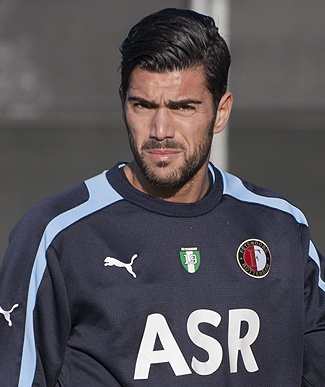
Graziano Pellè was Feyenoord's top goalscorer this season; including four league goals and one cup goal in September.

Feyenoord opened September with a 4–0 home win on the first day of the month against Roda JC. Four different Feyenoord players scored in the game; Vormer and Pellè in the first half and Nelom and Goossens after half time. The club announced halfway through the month they had signed Otman Bakkal without transfer fee. Bakkal had played for Feyenoord in the 2011–12 season as well before joining Russian club Dynamo Moscow for the 2012–13 season. On 15 September Feyenoord played the second game of the month in Nijmegen against N.E.C., the game ended in a 3-all draw after a last-minute equalizer by Bruno Martins Indi. The club got their third win in four league matches on 22 September at home due to the lone goal in the 35th minute from Tonny Vilhena against FC Utrecht. After a bye in the first round, Feyenoord started the 2013–14 KNVB Cup on the 26th at home against FC Dordrecht in the second round. They won the game 3–0; Pellè put the first goal on the board after 36 minutes, Schaken and Armenteros added a goal each to the scoreline in the second half. Feyenoord won the last match of September 4–2 at home against ADO Den Haag. They got up by four goals 18 minutes into the second half after a hattrick by Pellè and first half goal by Martins Indi; ADO got two goals on the board in the last ten minutes. From the five games in September, four league games and one cup game, Feyenoord drew one and won the other four.

Feyenoord started October on the road against Vitesse Arnhem on 6 October with a 1–2 win after two first half goals by De Vrij and Pellè. Pellè's goal marked his tenth league goal this season. Their second match in October was played away in Deventer against Go Ahead Eagles on the 19th. The game ended in a 2–2 draw after Feyenoord gained the lead twice by goals of De Vrij and Immers. The team played Heracles Almelo at home on the 27th resulting in a 1–2 loss after a first half own goal by Nelom and second half red card for Pellè. Jean-Paul Boëtius scored the lone home goal at the end of the first half in Feyenoord's first ever home defeat against Heracles. Feyenoord played their last game of the month in the KNVB Cup against HSV Hoek at home on the 30th. They won this third round match 3–0 against the Hoofdklasse side due to a Vandepitte own goal and further goals by Bakkal and Te Vrede.

=== November–February ===
Feyenoord headed to Cambuur Leeuwarden in the beginning of November, resulting in a 0–2 win with goals by Immers and Te Vrede. The win moved Feyenoord back into fourth place in the league table. The club hosted AZ in the second week of November for a 2–2 draw. Te Vrede and Immers scored 3 minutes apart just after half time; the final score was reached after Jóhannsson successfully converted a penalty. During the international match break Feyenoord played a friendly behind closed doors against FC Groningen, a game they won 4–1. Feyenoord closed out the month of November with a road game against RKC Waalwijk. They lost the game due to a lone 93rd-minute goal by their opponent.

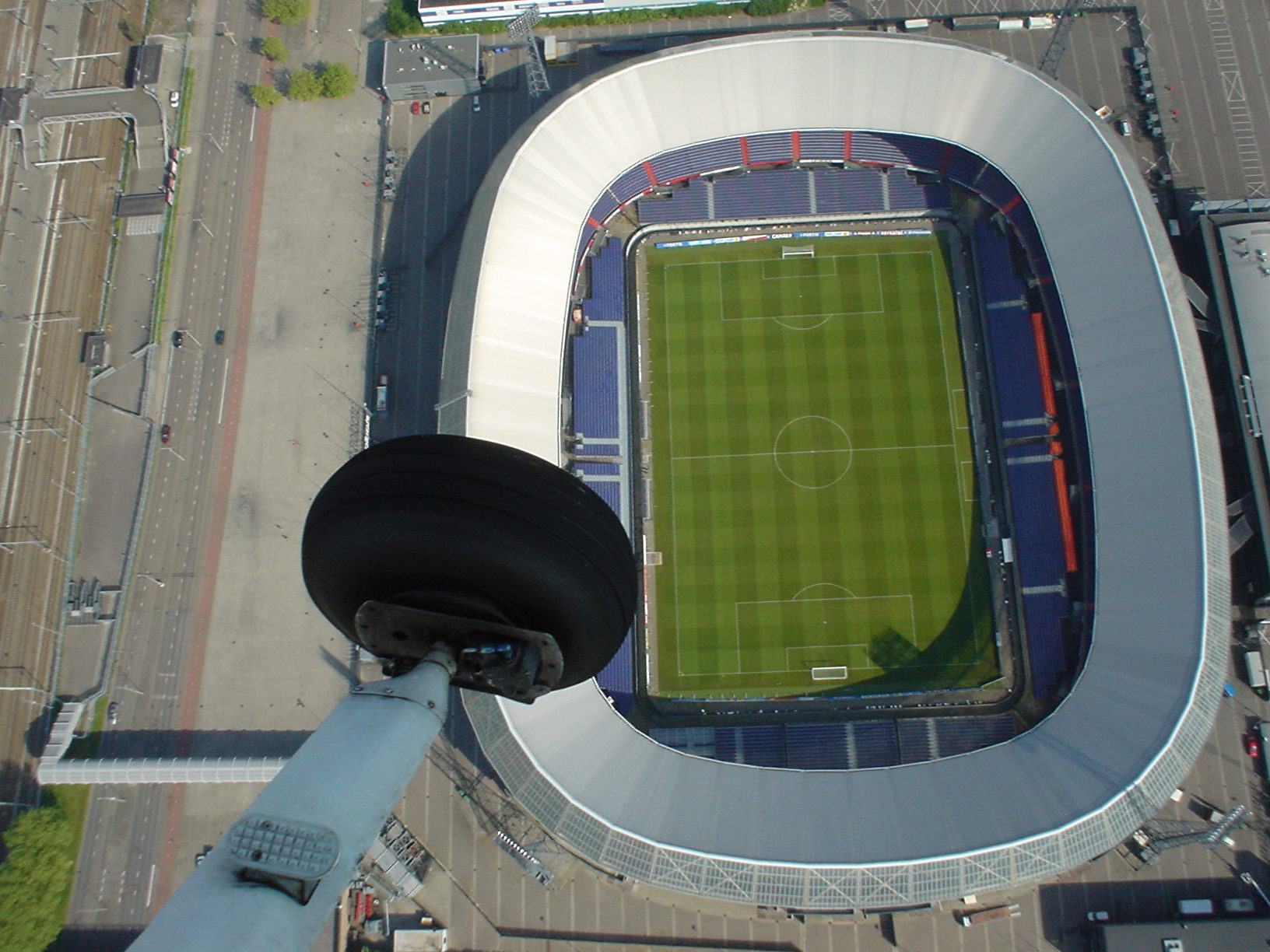
Feyenoord played its 2000th professional league game at home in De Kuip against PEC Zwolle.

Feyenoord opened December with a home game against PSV. The visitors took an early lead but Boëtius scored an equalizer in the first half stoppage time. Pellè added a penalty goal in the second half; several minutes later he got another attempt which he missed. Pellè later added another goal to the tally for a 3–1 Feyenoord win. The team moved back into fourth place in the league table after the first 15 games of the season. On 8 December Feyenoord played SC Heerenveen on the road. Feyenoord scored twice within the first quarter of an hour; Boëtius opened the score and Immers doubled the lead. The game ended as a 2–1 win after Heerenveen got on the board at the stroke of half-time. The win kept Feyenoord in fourth place in the Eredivisie standings. On 15 December, Feyenoord played FC Groningen at home. Pellè scored the lone goal of the game in the seventh minute of play. This third consecutive win kept Feyenoord in fourth place at the halfway mark of the season with 30 points from 17 matches. Feyenoord played their fourth round KNVB cup match in Almelo against Heracles Almelo on 18 December. Pellè scored after 11 minutes, Heracles equalized midway through the first half. Three minutes into extra time De Vrij received a second yellow card; Feyenoord kept the 1–1 score throughout extra time with ten men. In the penalty shootout all initial ten shooters scored. Clasie scored the sixth Feyenoord penalty before Heracles' Rienstra missed, sending Feyenoord to the quarter-finals of the KNVB Cup. Feyenoord's last game of 2013, at home against PEC Zwolle, marked their 2000th professional league game. They won the game 3–0 due to two first half goals in a seven-minute span by Immers and an early second half goal by Boëtius. This marked the last game before the winter break. Their five-game winning streak led them to fourth place in the league and the quarter-finals of the cup heading into the new year.

Early in January Feyenoord announced they parted ways with Cissé. On 5 January, the club played a charity match in De Kuip against Excelsior to support cancer research. They won 1–0 after a late goal by Vilhena. After this friendly they went to Marbella for a one-week training camp which ended with the second and last friendly of the winter break. They lost this game 0–1 against reigning Swiss champion FC Basel. Feyenoord resumed the season on 19 January with a 5–2 away win against FC Utrecht in a game in which the club trailed twice. Schaken scored both in the first and second half; Pellè, De Vrij and Vilhena all added to the scoreline once. On 22 January, Feyenoord got knocked out of the KNVB Cup in the quarter-finals in a 3–1 loss to Ajax. The following Saturday Feyenoord lost 3–2 away at ADO Den Haag. Feyenoord's last match of the month was played at home on the 31st against Vitesse Arnhem. The match ended in a 1–1 draw after a first half goal by Pellè.

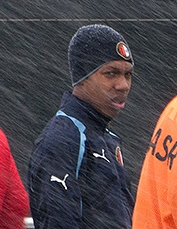
Jean-Paul Boëtius scored twice in Feyenoord's 5–1 win over NEC Nijmegen.

A day after the draw against Vitesse, Ronald Koeman announced he would end his tenure as manager of Feyenoord at the end of the 2013–14 season. On 4 February the team beat Roda JC away 2–1. Immers and Armenteros scored to take a two-goal lead at half time, Roda got on the board near the end of the game. The win moved Feyenoord to two points behind Vitesse. The following Saturday Feyenoord played N.E.C. at home. The visitors took an early lead, before Immers and Pellè gave Feyenoord a one-goal advantage at half time. An additional goal by Pellè and two scores from Boëtius led to a 5–1 win that led Feyenoord to third place in the league table. On 16 February the club played away at NAC Breda. The game ended in a 1–1 draw; Janmaat scored the lone Feyenoord goal in the first half before NAC equalized from a penalty kick. Feyenoord played their last February match on the 23rd away against FC Twente. They created a two-goal lead halfway in the second half from goals by Pellè and Boëtius before Twente scored twice to lead to a 2–2 draw. The last goal came after 5 minutes of stoppage time and was controversial as it was even considered to be offside by Twente player Castaignos. The club ended February fourth in the league table.

=== March–May ===
On 2 March Feyenoord played Ajax at home, where they lost 1–2 despite taking a first-half lead. On 3 March, the club announced Fred Rutten would succeed Ronald Koeman as manager per 1 July 2014 for the 2014–15 season. Feyenoord played FC Groningen away the following Sunday. They took an early lead in the first half with a Schaken goal, De Vrij doubled the scoreline shortly after halftime leading to a 2–0 victory. On 16 March, Feyenoord played SC Heerenveen at home. Vormer and Immers both scored in the second half to give Feyenoord a 2–0 win. They went on to win their third match in a row on 30 March in a 5–0 home match against Go Ahead Eagles. Feyenoord took an early lead in De Kuip with a 13th minute Immers goal; they added four more in the second half with Vilhena, Boëtius, Te Vrede and Nelom getting on the score sheet. This win, the largest margin of victory of the season, moved Feyenoord to second place in the league table with five matches to play.

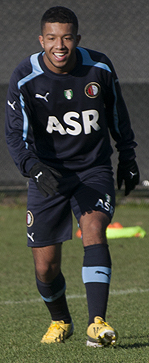
Tonny Vilhena made two goals in Feyenoord's 5–1 win over Cambuur. This win secured a Champions League qualifying spot.

Feyenoord opened April away in Almelo against Heracles Almelo on Wednesday 2 April, a game that was moved due to the 2014 Nuclear Security Summit. The home team opened the score early; Feyenoord took the lead later in the first half with goals by Te Vrede and Vilhena. The game ended in a 2–1 win, Feyenoord's fourth consecutive, and solidified the second place with a four-point lead and four games to play. Feyenoord won their fifth consecutive game on 6 April at home against RKC Waalwijk with 2–0. Pellè scored both goals in his return from a four-game suspension. A week later Feyenoord won its sixth game in a row away at PSV 2–0. Mathijsen scored his first of the season in the first half and Janmmaat scored after the break. They kept their second place staying four points clear of third place FC Twente. Feyenoord secured the second place in the league, and the associated berth to the third qualifying round of the 2014–15 UEFA Champions League on 27 April with a 5–1 home win against SC Cambuur. Vormer scored in the first half before Cambuur equalized just before halftime; Vilhena scored twice and Pellè and Boëtius one each to arrive at the final scoreline in Feyenoord's seventh consecutive win.

Feyenoord played its last game of the season on 3 May away at AZ. The game ended in a 1–1 draw, with Immers scoring the Feyenoord goal. Feyenoord finished in second place after the 34-game season with 20 wins, seven draws and seven losses for a total of 67 points. They scored a grand total of 76 goals, the most in the league, and conceded 40, third-lowest league-wide; Pellè was the second most productive player in the Eredivisie with 23 goals.

== Competitions ==
=== Overall ===
Competition	Started round	Final position / round	First match	Last match
Eredivisie	—	Runners-up	4 August 2013	3 May 2014
KNVB Cup	Second round	Quarter-final	26 September 2013	22 January 2014
UEFA Europa League	Play-off round	Play-off round	22 August 2013	29 August 2013

Source: Competitions

=== Eredivisie ===
==== League table ====
Pos	Team	Pld	W	D	L	GF	GA	GD	Pts	Qualification or relegation
1	Ajax (C)	34	20	11	3	69	28	+41	71	Qualification for the Champions League group stage
2	Feyenoord	34	20	7	7	76	40	+36	67	Qualification for the Champions League third qualifying round
3	Twente	34	17	12	5	72	37	+35	63	Qualification for the Europa League play-off round
4	PSV	34	18	5	11	60	45	+15	59	Qualification for the Europa League third qualifying round
5	Heerenveen	34	16	9	9	72	51	+21	57	Qualification for the European competition play-offs

Source: Eredivisie
Rules for classification: 1) points; 2) goal difference; 3) number of goals scored
(C) Champions

==== Results summary ====
Overall								Home						Away					
Pld	W	D	L	GF	GA	GD	Pts	W	D	L	GF	GA	GD	W	D	L	GF	GA	GD
34	20	7	7	76	40	+36	67	12	2	3	44	17	+27	8	5	4	32	23	+9

Source: Matches

==== Matches ====
4 August 2013 1	PEC Zwolle	2–1	Feyenoord	Zwolle
	Klich 65'; Fernandez 90+2'	Report	87' Schaken	Stadium: IJsseldelta Stadion; Attendance: 11,324; Referee: Gözübüyük

11 August 2013 2	Feyenoord	1–4	FC Twente	Rotterdam
	Pellè 29'; Van Deelen (red card) 57'; De Vrij (yellow card) 66' (red card)	Report	37' Ebecilio; 58' (pen.), 73' (pen.) Tadić; 79' Castaignos	Stadium: De Kuip; Attendance: 43,000; Referee: Liesveld

18 August 2013 3	Ajax	2–1	Feyenoord	Amsterdam
	Sigþórsson 31' (pen.), 37'	Report	6' Pellè	Stadium: Amsterdam Arena; Attendance: 52,581; Referee: Kuipers

25 August 2013 4	Feyenoord	3–1	NAC Breda	Rotterdam
	Pellè 37', 38', 53'	Report	59' Suk	Stadium: De Kuip; Attendance: 45,000; Referee: Makkelie

1 September 2013 5	Feyenoord	4–0	Roda JC	Rotterdam
	Vormer 31' (pen.); Pellè 44'; Nelom 68'; Goossens 85'	Report		Stadium: De Kuip; Attendance: 41,000; Referee: Wiedemeijer

15 September 2013 6	N.E.C.	3–3	Feyenoord	Nijmegen
	Štefánik 30', 77'; Pálsson 69'	Report	26' Immers; 67' Boëtius; 90' Martins Indi	Stadium: Stadion de Goffert; Attendance: 9,118; Referee: Blom

22 September 2013 7	Feyenoord	1–0	FC Utrecht	Rotterdam
	Vilhena 35'	Report		Stadium: De Kuip; Attendance: 46,000; Referee: Kuipers

29 September 2013 8	Feyenoord	4–2	ADO Den Haag	Rotterdam
	Pellè 7', 54', 63' (pen.); Martins Indi 45'	Report	84' Van Haaren; 88' (o.g.) Clasie	Stadium: De Kuip; Attendance: 41,000; Referee: Gözübüyük

6 October 2013 9	Vitesse Arnhem	1–2	Feyenoord	Arnhem
	Havenaar 83'	Report	18' De Vrij; 20' Pellè	Stadium: GelreDome; Attendance: 18,200; Referee: Vink

19 October 2013 10	Go Ahead Eagles	2–2	Feyenoord	Deventer
	Amevor 48'; Kolder 89'	Report	17'De Vrij; 63' Immers	Stadium: De Adelaarshorst; Attendance: 7,681; Referee: Makkelie

27 October 2013 11	Feyenoord	1–2	Heracles Almelo	Rotterdam
	Boëtius 43'; Pellè (red card) 89'	Report	41' (o.g.) Nelom; 63' Rosheuvel	Stadium: De Kuip; Attendance: 46,000; Referee: Blom

3 November 2013 12	SC Cambuur	0–2	Feyenoord	Leeuwarden
		Report	45+1' Immers; 73' Te Vrede	Stadium: Cambuur Stadion; Attendance: 10,000; Referee: Van Boekel

10 November 2013 13	Feyenoord	2–2	AZ	Rotterdam
	Te Vrede 48'; Immers 51'	Report	17', 57' (pen.) Jóhannsson	Stadium: De Kuip; Attendance: 46,000; Referee: Nijhuis

24 November 2013 14	RKC Waalwijk	1–0	Feyenoord	Waalwijk
	Joachim 90+3'	Report		Stadium: Mandemakers Stadion; Attendance: 7,500; Referee: Vink

1 December 2013 15	Feyenoord	3–1	PSV	Rotterdam
	Boëtius 45+1'; Pellè 54' (pen.), 65'	Report	21' Maher; (yellow card) 57' (yellow-red card) Bruma	Stadium: De Kuip; Attendance: 47,500; Referee: Makkelie

8 December 2013 16	SC Heerenveen	1–2	Feyenoord	Heerenveen
	Van Beek 45+2' (o.g.)	Report	9' Boëtius; 16' Immers	Stadium: Abe Lenstra Stadion; Attendance: 25,700; Referee: Kuipers

15 December 2013 17	Feyenoord	1–0	FC Groningen	Rotterdam
	Pellè 7'	Report		Stadium: De Kuip; Attendance: 42,800; Referee: Blom

21 December 2013 18	Feyenoord	3–0	PEC Zwolle	Rotterdam
	Immers 33', 39'; Boëtius 55'	Report		Stadium: De Kuip; Attendance: 47,500; Referee: Gözübüyük

19 January 2014 19	FC Utrecht	2–5	Feyenoord	Utrecht
	Toornstra 12', 22'	Report	17', 72' Schaken; 18' Pellè; 33' De Vrij; 89' Vilhena	Stadium: Stadion Galgenwaard; Attendance: 22,134; Referee: Vink

25 January 2014 20	ADO Den Haag	3–2	Feyenoord	The Hague
	Beugelsdijk 36'; Bakker 45+3'; Alberg 77'	Report	68' Clasie; 74' Pellè	Stadium: Kyocera Stadion; Attendance: 12,789; Referee: Kuipers

31 January 2014 21	Feyenoord	1–1	Vitesse Arnhem	Rotterdam
	Pellè 39'	Report	57' Kashia	Stadium: De Kuip; Attendance: 47,000; Referee: Gözübüyük

4 February 2014 22	Roda JC	1–2	Feyenoord	Kerkrade
	Kali 77' (pen.)	Report	13' Immers; 45' Armenteros	Stadium: Parkstad Limburg Stadion; Attendance: 13,793; Referee: Makkelie

8 February 2014 23	Feyenoord	5–1	N.E.C.	Rotterdam
	Immers 26'; Pellè 35', 59'; Boëtius 55', 78'	Report	11' Rieks	Stadium: De Kuip; Attendance: 47,000; Referee: Wiedemeijer

16 February 2014 24	NAC Breda	1–1	Feyenoord	Breda
	Poepon 37' (pen.); Perica (red card) 84'	Report	25' Janmaat	Stadium: Rat Verlegh Stadion; Attendance: 18,551; Referee: Nijhuis

23 February 2014 25	FC Twente	2–2	Feyenoord	Enschede
	Castaignos 68'; Martina 90+5'	Report	14' Pellè; 55' Boëtius	Stadium: De Grolsch Veste; Attendance: 29,900; Referee: Gözübüyük

2 March 2014 26	Feyenoord	1–2	Ajax	Rotterdam
	Pellè 30'	Report	45' Sigþórsson; 72' Veltman	Stadium: De Kuip; Attendance: 48,000; Referee: Kuipers

9 March 2014 27	FC Groningen	0–2	Feyenoord	Groningen
		Report	15' Schaken; 49' De Vrij	Stadium: Euroborg; Attendance: 21,674; Referee: Braamhaar

16 March 2014 28	Feyenoord	2–0	SC Heerenveen	Rotterdam
	Vormer 49'; Immers 64'	Report	(red card) 73' Kum	Stadium: De Kuip; Attendance: 47,500; Referee: Vink

30 March 2014 30 (Note: Heracles–Feyenoord of round 29 was rescheduled from the original date of 23 March 2014 to 2 April 2014, because the necessary police presence could not be met due to the 2014 Nuclear Security Summit.)	Feyenoord	5–0	Go Ahead Eagles	Rotterdam
	Immers 14'; Vilhena 49'; Boëtius 64'; Te Vrede 77'; Nelom 89'	Report		Stadium: De Kuip; Attendance: 45,000; Referee: Liesveld

2 April 2014 29	Heracles Almelo	1–2	Feyenoord	Almelo
	Bel Hassani 14'; Cziommer (yellow card) 87' (yellow-red card)	Report	30' Te Vrede; 41' Vilhena	Stadium: Polman Stadion; Attendance: 7,985; Referee: Makkelie

6 April 2014 31	Feyenoord	2–0	RKC Waalwijk	Rotterdam
	Pellè 38', 65'	Report		Stadium: De Kuip; Attendance: 47,500; Referee: Blom

13 April 2014 32	PSV	0–2	Feyenoord	Eindhoven
		Report	29' Mathijsen; 76' Janmaat	Stadium: Philips Stadion; Attendance: 34,300; Referee: Kuipers

27 April 2014 33	Feyenoord	5–1	SC Cambuur	Rotterdam
	Vormer 23'; Vilhena 49', 87'; Pellè 72'; Boëtius 90'	Report	43' Barto	Stadium: De Kuip; Attendance: 47,500; Referee: Braamhaar

3 May 2014 34	AZ	1–1	Feyenoord	Alkmaar
	Guðmundsson 88'	Report	54' Immers	Stadium: AFAS Stadion; Attendance: 16,749; Referee: Van Sichem

Source: Feyenoord

=== KNVB Cup ===
26 September 2013 Second round	Feyenoord	3–0	FC Dordrecht	Rotterdam
	Pellè 36'; Schaken 64'; Armenteros 90+2'	Report		Stadium: De Kuip; Attendance: 28,000; Referee: Higler

30 October 2013 Third round	Feyenoord	3–0	HSV Hoek	Rotterdam
	Vandepitte 31' (o.g.); Bakkal 63'; Te Vrede 67'	Report		Stadium: De Kuip; Attendance: 21,000; Referee: Janssen

18 December 2013 Fourth round	Heracles Almelo	1–1 (a.e.t.) (5–6 p)	Feyenoord	Almelo
	Linssen 27'	Report	12' Pellè; (yellow card) 93' (yellow-red card) De Vrij	Stadium: Polman Stadion; Attendance: 6,012; Referee: Nijhuis
	Penalties
	Quansah (penalty scored); Uth (penalty scored); Bruns (penalty scored); Te Wierik (penalty scored); Pasveer (penalty scored); Rienstra (penalty missed)		(penalty scored) Pellè; (penalty scored) Vormer; (penalty scored) Goossens; (penalty scored) Mathijsen; (penalty scored) Janmaat; (penalty scored) Clasie

22 January 2014 Quarter-final	Ajax	3–1	Feyenoord	Amsterdam
	Fischer 34'; Bojan 68'; Serero 90+2'	Report	7' Boëtius	Stadium: Amsterdam Arena; Attendance: 50,340; Referee: Blom

=== Europa League ===
==== Play-off round ====
22 August 2013 First leg	FC Kuban Krasnodar	1–0	Feyenoord	Krasnodar
	Baldé 60'	Report		Stadium: Kuban Stadium; Attendance: 32,275; Referee: Turpin

29 August 2013 Second leg	Feyenoord	1–2 (1–3 agg.)	FC Kuban Krasnodar	Rotterdam
	Graziano Pellè 7'	Report	19' Popov; 50' Bucur	Stadium: De Kuip; Attendance: 45,000; Referee: Oliver

=== Friendlies ===
6 July 2013	SC Feyenoord	0–7	Feyenoord	Rotterdam
		Report	21' Verhoek; 49', 64', 90' Pellè; 63' Vormer; 68' Manu; 85' Immers	Stadium: Sportcomplex Varkenoord; Referee: Van de Graaf

9 July 2013	FC Horst	0–10	Feyenoord	Ermelo
		Report	5', 11', 29' Manu; 7' Immers; 24' (o.g.); 36' Pellè; 70', 71', 75', 79' Te Vrede	Stadium: Sportpark de Adelaar; Referee: Luinge

11 July 2013	HHC Hardenberg	0–6	Feyenoord	Hardenberg
		Report	15', 22', 41' Te Vrede; 59' Goossens; 80' Vilhena; 87' Singh	Stadium: De Boshoek

13 July 2013	ASWH	0–5	Feyenoord	Hendrik-Ido-Ambacht
		Report	40' Pellè; 45' (pen.) Vilhena; 56' Manu; 70' Vormer; 80'Steenvoorden	Stadium: Sportpark Schildman; Referee: Makkelie

20 July 2013	FC Dordrecht	1–1	Feyenoord	Dordrecht
	Lima 84'	Report	8' (pen.) Pellè	Stadium: GN Bouw Stadion; Referee: Van Sichem

24 July 2013	Hellas Verona	1–0	Feyenoord	Trento
	Toni 8'	Report		Stadium: Stadio Briamasco; Referee: Tommasi

28 July 2013	Feyenoord	3–1	Getafe CF	Rotterdam
	Immers 19'; Moyà 49' (o.g.); Verhoek 76'	Report	52' Gavilán	Stadium: De Kuip; Referee: Nijhuis

5 September 2013	RKC Waalwijk	2–0	Feyenoord	Waalwijk
	Ubbink; Lemke	Report		Stadium: Mandemakers Stadion

15 October 2013	Feyenoord	4–1	Excelsior	Rotterdam
	Immers 5'; Manu 11'; Verhoek 50'; Te Vrede 54'	Report	38' Janga	Stadium: Sportcomplex Varkenoord

19 November 2013	Feyenoord	4–1	FC Groningen	Rotterdam
	Immers 26'; Armenteros 30'; Manu 57'; Vormer 67'	Report	77' (pen.) Hateboer	Stadium: De Kuip; Referee: Janssen

5 January 2014 Erasmus MC charity match	Feyenoord	1–0	Excelsior	Rotterdam
	Vilhena 88'	Report		Stadium: De Kuip; Attendance: 40,000; Referee: Kamphuis

11 January 2014	FC Basel	1–0	Feyenoord	Marbella
	Streller 16'	Report		Stadium: Marbella Football Centre

== Player details ==
No.	Pos	Nat	Player	Total		Eredivisie		KNVB Cup		Europa League	
No.	Pos	Nat	Player	Apps	Goals	Apps	Goals	Apps	Goals	Apps	Goals
1	GK	(Netherlands) NED	Erwin Mulder	37	0	32	0	3	0	2	0
2	DF	(Netherlands) NED	Daryl Janmaat	35	2	30	2	4	0	1	0
3	DF	(Netherlands) NED	Stefan de Vrij	35	4	32	4	1	0	2	0
4	DF	(Netherlands) NED	Joris Mathijsen	25	1	20	1	4	0	1	0
5	DF	(Netherlands) NED	Bruno Martins Indi	31	2	26	2	3	0	2	0
6	MF	(Netherlands) NED	Jordy Clasie	37	1	32	1	3	0	2	0
7	FW	(Netherlands) NED	Jean-Paul Boëtius	32	11	29	10	3	1	0	0
8	MF	(Netherlands) NED	Ruud Vormer	21	3	16	3	3	0	2	0
9	FW	(Italy) ITA	Graziano Pellè	33	26	28	23	3	2	2	1
10	MF	(Netherlands) NED	Lex Immers	37	12	32	12	3	0	2	0
11	FW	(Netherlands) NED	Wesley Verhoek	8	0	6	0	1	0	1	0
13	GK	(Netherlands) NED	Ronald Graafland	1	0	1	0	0	0	0	0
14	FW	(Sweden) SWE	Samuel Armenteros	23	2	19	1	2	1	2	0
15	DF	(Netherlands) NED	Terence Kongolo	18	0	17	0	1	0	0	0
16	MF	(Norway) NOR	Harmeet Singh	0	0	0	0	0	0	0	0
17	MF	(Netherlands) NED	Otman Bakkal	9	1	8	0	1	1	0	0
18	DF	(Netherlands) NED	Miquel Nelom	22	2	18	2	3	0	1	0
19	FW	(Netherlands) NED	Mitchell te Vrede	15	5	14	4	1	1	0	0
20	MF	(Netherlands) NED	John Goossens	23	1	20	1	3	0	0	0
21	MF	(Netherlands) NED	Tonny Vilhena	38	6	33	6	3	0	2	0
22	DF	(Netherlands) NED	Sven van Beek	15	0	10	0	4	0	1	0
23	FW	(Ivory Coast) CIV	Sekou Cissé	1	0	1	0	0	0	0	0
24	DF	(Netherlands) NED	Matthew Steenvoorden	0	0	0	0	0	0	0	0
25	DF	(Netherlands) NED	Lucas Woudenberg	0	0	0	0	0	0	0	0
27	FW	(Netherlands) NED	Ruben Schaken	38	5	32	4	4	1	2	0
28	FW	(Netherlands) NED	Elvis Manu	4	0	1	0	1	0	2	0
29	FW	(Netherlands) NED	Anass Achahbar	0	0	0	0	0	0	0	0
30	MF	(Netherlands) NED	Joey Sleegers	0	0	0	0	0	0	0	0
32	DF	(Netherlands) NED	Jordy van Deelen	1	0	1	0	0	0	0	0
33	GK	(Greece) GRE	Kostas Lamprou	3	0	2	0	1	0	0	0
34	MF	(Netherlands) NED	Rick Dekker	0	0	0	0	0	0	0	0
35	DF	(Netherlands) NED	Rodney Lopes Cabral	0	0	0	0	0	0	0	0
35	DF	(Netherlands) NED	Jeff Hardeveld	0	0	0	0	0	0	0	0

Sources: Squad numbers, Eredivisie and KNVB Cup stats, Europa League statistics

== Transfers ==
=== In ===
Date	Name	To	Fee	Ref
5 January 2013	Graziano Pellè	Sampdoria	€3,000,000	
16 September 2013	Otman Bakkal	Unattached	Free	

=== Out ===
Date	Name	To	Fee	Ref
10 May 2013	Kamohelo Mokotjo	PEC Zwolle	Free	
1 July 2013	Kelvin Leerdam	Vitesse Arnhem	Free	
3 January 2014	Sekou Cissé	Unattached	Free	
14 January 2014	Harmeet Singh	Unattached	Free	

=== Loans in ===
Date	Name	To	Fee	Ref
15 August 2013	Samuel Armenteros	RSC Anderlecht	Loan	

=== Loans out ===
Date	Name	To	Fee	Ref
25 June 2013	Mats van Huijgevoort	Willen II	Loan	
15 July 2013	Guyon Fernandez	PEC Zwolle	Loan	
5 August 2013	Kaj Ramsteijn	Sparta Rotterdam	Loan	
22 August 2013	Anass Achahbar	Arminia Bielefeld	Loan	
2 September 2013	Lucas Woudenberg	Excelsior Rotterdam	Loan	
2 September 2013	Matthew Steenvoorden	FC Dordrecht	Loan	
9 January 2014	Elvis Manu	Cambuur Leeuwarden	Loan	
16 January 2014	Jordy van Deelen	FC Dordrecht	Loan	

== Club ==
=== Coaching staff ===
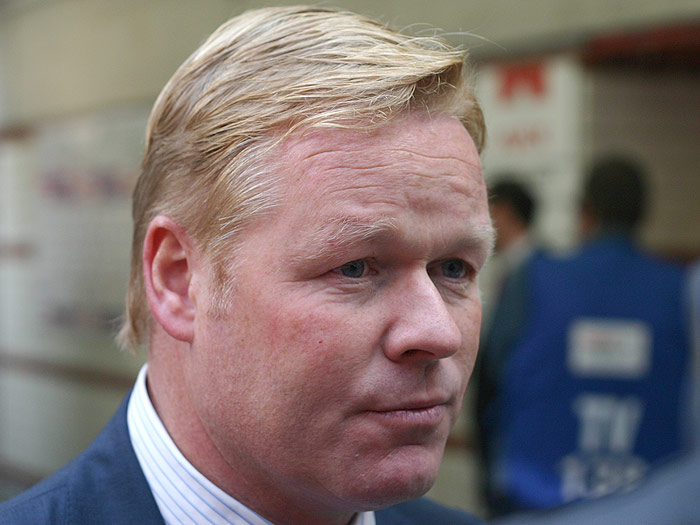
This was Ronald Koeman's third and final season as manager of Feyenoord.

Position	Staff
Manager	Ronald Koeman
Assistant manager	Jean-Paul van Gastel
Assistant manager	Giovanni van Bronckhorst
Goalkeeping coach	Patrick Lodewijks
Fitness coach	Jan Kluitenberg
Team manager	Bas van Noortwijk

Last updated: 15 April 2014
Source: Feyenoord

=== Kit ===
Supplier: Puma
Sponsor(s): Opel

Home	Away	Goalkeeper (1)	Goalkeeper (2)	Goalkeeper (3)

Last updated: 23 July 2013.
Source: Feyenoord
In March 2013 it was announced that Feyenoord signed a four-year deal which would make Opel the club's main sponsor and would return the name Opel to its match kit beginning at the start of the 2013–14 season. It marks a return for Opel as Feyenoord's main sponsor, a position it held from 1984 to 1989. The match kits for the new season were presented in April 2013. The home jersey was similar to the previous season version with an updated sponsor name. The away kit took design cues from the white and green colours of the flag of Rotterdam and incorporates the coat of arms of Rotterdam on the side of the jersey.
