= 2011–12 Feyenoord season =

Feyenoord
2011–12 season
- Chairman: Dick van Well
- Manager: Ronald Koeman
- Stadium: De Kuip
- Eredivisie: 2nd
- KNVB Cup: Third round
- Top goalscorer: League: John Guidetti (20); All: John Guidetti (20)
Home colours	Away colours

The 2011–12 season was Feyenoord's 104th season of play, it was their 56th season in the Eredivisie and its 90th consecutive season in the highest Dutch football division. They ended their league campaign in second place, after winning ten of the last eleven games of the season. They reached the third round of the KNVB Cup. It was the first season with Ronald Koeman, who signed as manager of Feyenoord after former manager Mario Been resigned on 13 July 2011 due to a lack of trust from the squad.

== Competitions ==
=== Overall ===
Competition	Started round	Final position / round	First match	Last match
Eredivisie	—	Runner-up	5 August 2011	6 May 2012
KNVB Cup	2nd round	3rd round	20 September 2011	27 October 2011

Source: Competitions

=== Eredivisie ===
==== League table ====
Pos	Team	Pld	W	D	L	GF	GA	GD	Pts	Qualification or relegation
1	Ajax (C)	34	23	7	4	93	36	+57	76	Qualification to Champions League group stage
2	Feyenoord	34	21	7	6	70	37	+33	70	Qualification to Champions League third qualifying round
3	PSV	34	21	6	7	87	47	+40	69	Qualification to Europa League play-off round (Note: PSV qualified for the play-off round of the 2012–13 UEFA Europa League after winning the 2011–12 KNVB Cup. As they finished third in the league, all Europa League berths and play-off places were moved down one spot from the original scheme.)
4	AZ	34	19	8	7	64	35	+29	65	Qualification to Europa League play-off round
5	Heerenveen	34	18	10	6	79	59	+20	64	Qualification to Europa League third qualifying round

Source: Eredivisie (official site) (in Dutch)
Rules for classification: 1) points; 2) goal difference; 3) number of goals scored.
(C) Champions

==== Results summary ====
Overall								Home						Away					
Pld	W	D	L	GF	GA	GD	Pts	W	D	L	GF	GA	GD	W	D	L	GF	GA	GD
34	21	7	6	70	37	+33	70	12	3	2	39	15	+24	9	4	4	31	22	+9

Source: Matches

==== Results by round ====
Round	1	2	3	4	5	6	7	8	9	10	11	12	13	14	15	16	17	18	19	20	21	22	23	24	25	26	27	28	29	30	31	32	33	34
Ground	A	H	A	H	A	H	A	H	H	A	A	H	A	A	H	A	H	A	H	A	H	H	A	H	H	A	A	H	A	H	A	H	H	A
Result	W	W	D	D	W	W	L	L	W	D	L	L	W	W	W	D	W	L	W	W	W	D	L	W	D	W	W	W	D	W	W	W	W	W
Position	3	2	3	5	4	4	5	5	4	4	6	8	5	5	5	6	5	6	6	5	5	5	6	6	6	5	5	5	4	3	3	2	2	2

Source: worldfootball.net
A = Away; H = Home; W = Win; D = Draw; L = Loss

==== Matches ====
5 August 2011	Excelsior	0 – 2	Feyenoord	Rotterdam
		Report	55' Fernandez; 71' (o.g.) Van Steensel	Stadium: Stadion Woudestein; Attendance: 3,518; Referee: Vink

13 August 2011	Feyenoord	3 – 0	Roda JC	Rotterdam
	Cabral 12', 54'; Fer 48'	Report		Stadium: De Kuip; Attendance: 42,000; Referee: Kuipers

21 August 2011	Heracles Almelo	1 – 1	Feyenoord	Almelo
	Plet 63'	Report	78' Fernandez	Stadium: Polman Stadion; Attendance: 8,500; Referee: Wiedemeijer

28 August 2011	Feyenoord	2 – 2	SC Heerenveen	Rotterdam
	Fer 33'; Cabral 57'	Report	26' (pen.) Dost; 47' Assaidi	Stadium: De Kuip; Attendance: 41,000; Referee: Braamhaar

11 September 2011	NAC Breda	1 – 3	Feyenoord	Breda
	Schilder 7'	Report	37' Bakkal; 60' El Ahmadi; 87' (pen.) Guidetti	Stadium: Rat Verlegh Stadion; Attendance: 17,800; Referee: Van Hulten

17 September 2011	Feyenoord	4 – 0	De Graafschap	Rotterdam
	Schaken 47'; Guidetti 59' (pen.); Leerdam 67'; Fernandez 79' (pen.)	Report		Stadium: De Kuip; Attendance: 41,000; Referee: Wiedemeijer

25 September 2011	AZ	2 – 1	Feyenoord	Alkmaar
	Elm 60'; Holman 85'	Report	36' Bakkal	Stadium: AFAS Stadion; Attendance: 16,733; Referee: Van Boekel

2 October 2011	Feyenoord	0 – 3	ADO Den Haag	Rotterdam
		Report	15', 45' Verhoek; 53' Chery	Stadium: De Kuip; Attendance: 41,000; Referee: Vink

16 October 2011	Feyenoord	4 – 0	VVV-Venlo	Rotterdam
	Guidetti 31' (pen.), 50' (pen.); El Ahmadi 52'; Van Haaren 83'	Report		Stadium: De Kuip; Attendance: 47,000; Referee: Gözübüyük

23 October 2011	Ajax	1 – 1	Feyenoord	Amsterdam
	Vertonghen 67'	Report	61' De Vrij	Stadium: Amsterdam Arena; Attendance: 52,316; Referee: Nijhuis

30 October 2011	FC Groningen	6 – 0	Feyenoord	Groningen
	Tadić 1'; Kieftenbeld 16'; Andersson 18'; Bacuna 57'; Van Dijk 89'; Suk 90'	Report		Stadium: Euroborg; Attendance: 21,000; Referee: Kuipers

5 November 2011	Feyenoord	0 – 1	N.E.C.	Rotterdam
		Report	7' Van der Velden	Stadium: De Kuip; Attendance: 44,000; Referee: Van Sichem

20 November 2011	Vitesse Arnhem	0 – 4	Feyenoord	Arnhem
		Report	4', 42' Guidetti; 32' Clasie; 56' Cissé	Stadium: GelreDome; Attendance: 19,039; Referee: Nijhuis

27 November 2011	RKC Waalwijk	1 – 2	Feyenoord	Waalwijk
	Ten Voorde 36'	Report	76' Guidetti; 83' Cabral	Stadium: Mandemakers Stadion; Attendance: 7,400; Referee: Blom

4 December 2011	Feyenoord	2 – 0	PSV	Rotterdam
	Cissé 41'; Schaken 50'	Report		Stadium: De Kuip; Attendance: 46,000; Referee: Kuipers

11 December 2011	FC Utrecht	2 – 2	Feyenoord	Utrecht
	Bovenberg 31'; Duplan 51'	Report	2' Guidetti; 66' Cabral	Stadium: Stadion Galgenwaard; Attendance: 22,000; Referee: Vink

18 December 2011	Feyenoord	3 – 2	FC Twente	Rotterdam
	Guidetti 8', 43', 44'	Report	56' Chadli; 66' De Jong	Stadium: De Kuip; Attendance: 44,000; Referee: Liesveld

22 January 2012	VVV-Venlo	2 – 1	Feyenoord	Venlo
	Linssen 40'; Vorstermans 45'	Report	12' Martins Indi	Stadium: De Koel; Attendance: 8,000; Referee: Makkelie

29 January 2012	Feyenoord	4 – 2	Ajax	Rotterdam
	Guidetti 30' (pen.), 41', 83'; Bakkal 50'	Report	18' Eriksen; 80' Bulykin	Stadium: De Kuip; Attendance: 48,000; Referee: Kuipers

5 February 2012	N.E.C.	0 – 2	Feyenoord	Nijmegen
		Report	6' Bakkal; 48' Fernandez	Stadium: Stadion de Goffert; Attendance: 11,687; Referee: Boucaut

12 February 2012	Feyenoord	3 – 1	Vitesse Arnhem	Rotterdam
	Guidetti 12', 31' (pen.), 83'	Report	41' (pen.) Hofs	Stadium: De Kuip; Attendance: 43,000; Referee: Gözübüyük

18 February 2012	Feyenoord	1 – 1	RKC Waalwijk	Rotterdam
	Guidetti 77' (pen.)	Report	87' Braber	Stadium: De Kuip; Attendance: 44,500; Referee: Makkelie

26 February 2012	PSV	3 – 2	Feyenoord	Eindhoven
	Toivonen 44'; Mertens 66'; Labyad 85'	Report	71', 79' Fernandez	Stadium: Philips Stadion; Attendance: 33,000; Referee: Liesveld

4 March 2012	Feyenoord	1 – 0	FC Groningen	Rotterdam
	Clasie 44'	Report		Stadium: De Kuip; Attendance: 43,000; Referee: Van Hulten

11 March 2012	Feyenoord	1 – 1	FC Utrecht	Rotterdam
	Bakkal 6'	Report	59' Van der Gun	Stadium: De Kuip; Attendance: 46,000; Referee: Van Boekel

18 March 2012	FC Twente	0 – 2	Feyenoord	Enschede
		Report	Röseler 49' (o.g.); Cissé 86'	Stadium: De Grolsch Veste; Attendance: 30,000; Referee: Blom

25 March 2012	De Graafschap	0 – 3	Feyenoord	Doetinchem
		Report	71' Guidetti; 77' Schaken; 90+3' Cissé	Stadium: De Vijverberg; Attendance: 12,600; Referee: Kuipers

31 March 2012	Feyenoord	3 – 1	NAC Breda	Rotterdam
	Bakkal 3'; Schaken 32'; Cissé 43'	Report	19' Bayram	Stadium: De Kuip; Attendance: 48,000; Referee: Nijhuis

11 April 2012	Roda JC	0 – 0	Feyenoord	Kerkrade
		Report		Stadium: Parkstad Limburg Stadion; Attendance: 17,029; Referee: Liesveld

14 April 2012	Feyenoord	3 – 0	Excelsior	Rotterdam
	Guidetti 8'; Clasie 49'; Cabral 58'	Report		Stadium: De Kuip; Attendance: 48,000; Referee: Van Boekel

22 April 2012	ADO Den Haag	1 – 2	Feyenoord	The Hague
	Immers 89' (pen.)	Report	46' Schaken; 70' Fernandez	Stadium: Kyocera Stadion; Attendance: 13,248; Referee: Vink

29 April 2012	Feyenoord	1 – 0	AZ	Rotterdam
	Bakkal 54'	Report		Stadium: De Kuip; Attendance: 48,000; Referee: Braamhaar

2 May 2012	Feyenoord	4 – 1	Heracles Almelo	Rotterdam
	Bakkal 11'; Cabral 53'; Cissé 64'; Schaken 65'	Report	72' Overtoom	Stadium: De Kuip; Attendance: 51,777; Referee: Bossen

6 May 2012	SC Heerenveen	2 – 3	Feyenoord	Heerenveen
	Dost 56'; Van La Parra 85'	Report	60' Bakkal; 69' Cissé; 71' Manu	Stadium: Abe Lenstra Stadion; Attendance: 26,100; Referee: Kuipers

=== KNVB Cup ===
20 September 2011 Second round	Feyenoord	4 – 0	AGOVV	Rotterdam
	Cissé 14'; El Ahmadi 39'; Bakkal 51'; Achahbar 68'	Report		Stadium: De Kuip; Attendance: 24,000; Referee: Liesveld

27 October 2011 Third round	Go Ahead Eagles	2 – 1	Feyenoord	Deventer
	Suk 7'; Kolder 58' (pen.)	Report	88' Vlaar	Stadium: De Adelaarshorst; Attendance: 6,493; Referee: Braamhaar

== Player details ==
No.	Pos	Nat	Player	Total		Eredivisie		KNVB Cup		Friendly	
No.	Pos	Nat	Player	Apps	Goals	Apps	Goals	Apps	Goals	Apps	Goals
17	GK	(Netherlands) NED	Erwin Mulder	41	0	34	0	0	0	7	0
1	GK	(Brazil) BRA	Darley	3	0	0	0	0	0	3	0
25	GK	(Greece) GRE	Kostas Lamprou	9	0	0	0	2	0	7	0
29	GK	(Netherlands) NED	Ronald Graafland	1	0	0	0	0	0	1	0
2	DF	(Belgium) BEL	Gill Swerts	5	0	3	0	0	0	2	0
3	DF	(Netherlands) NED	Stefan de Vrij	33	2	22	1	2	0	9	1
4	DF	(Netherlands) NED	Ron Vlaar	38	2	26	0	2	1	10	1
5	DF	(Netherlands) NED	Bruno Martins Indi	31	2	21	1	2	0	8	1
7	DF	(Netherlands) NED	Kelvin Leerdam	34	3	23	1	1	0	10	2
14	DF	(Netherlands) NED	Kaj Ramsteijn	15	0	6	0	1	0	8	0
18	DF	(Netherlands) NED	Miquel Nelom	22	1	13	0	0	0	9	1
21	DF	(Spain) ESP	Daniel Fernández	9	0	5	0	1	0	3	0
24	DF	(Netherlands) NED	Mats van Huijgevoort	2	0	1	0	0	0	1	0
24	DF	(Netherlands) NED	Bart Schenkeveld	2	0	0	0	0	0	2	0
30	DF	(Netherlands) NED	Matthew Steenvoorden	2	0	0	0	0	0	2	0
32	DF	(Netherlands) NED	Terence Kongolo	2	0	0	0	0	0	2	0
6	MF	(Morocco) MAR	Karim El Ahmadi	34	7	24	2	2	1	8	4
8	MF	(Netherlands) NED	Otman Bakkal	25	6	21	5	2	1	2	0
8	MF	(Netherlands) NED	Leroy Fer	7	3	0	0	0	0	7	3
15	MF	(South Africa) RSA	Kamohelo Mokotjo	28	2	18	0	2	0	8	2
16	MF	(Netherlands) NED	Jordy Clasie	35	2	25	2	0	0	10	0
26	MF	(Netherlands) NED	Ricky van Haaren	17	4	8	1	1	0	8	3
33	MF	(Netherlands) NED	Tonny Vilhena	5	0	3	0	0	0	2	0
28	MF	(Netherlands) NED	Adil Auassar	6	2	0	0	0	0	6	2
9	FW	(Netherlands) NED	Guyon Fernandez	27	12	15	6	2	0	10	6
10	FW	(Sweden) SWE	John Guidetti	25	23	23	20	0	0	2	3
11	FW	(Netherlands) NED	Jerson Cabral	35	7	23	5	2	0	10	2
20	FW	(Netherlands) NED	Anass Achahbar	8	1	4	0	2	1	2	0
22	FW	(Netherlands) NED	Diego Biseswar	8	4	0	0	1	0	7	4
23	FW	(Ivory Coast) CIV	Sekou Cissé	23	7	15	3	2	1	6	3
27	FW	(Netherlands) NED	Ruben Schaken	42	9	32	6	1	0	9	3
28	FW	(Netherlands) NED	Elvis Manu	6	2	4	1	0	0	2	1
30	FW	(Netherlands) NED	Shabir Isoufi	4	3	0	0	0	0	4	3
