= Bruno Martins Indi =

Dutch footballer (born 1992)

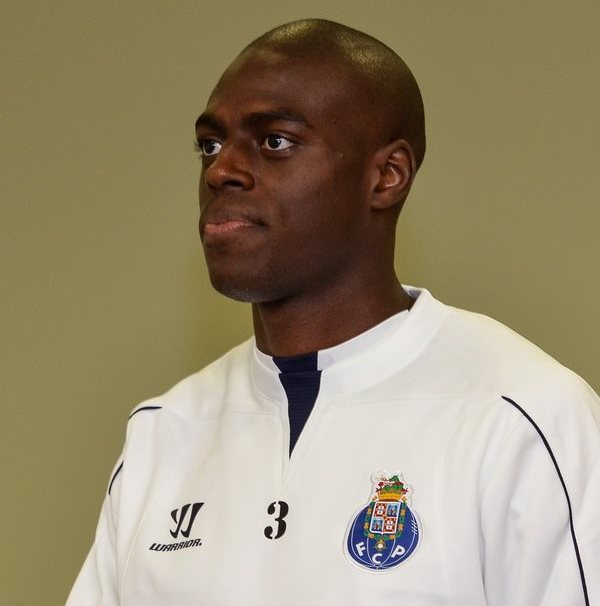
- Martins Indi with Porto in 2014

Personal information
- Full name: Rolando Maximiliano Martins Indi
- Date of birth: 8 February 1992 (age 34)
- Place of birth: Barreiro, Portugal
- Height: 1.85 m (6 ft 1 in)
- Position: Defender

Team information
- Current team: Sparta Rotterdam
- Number: 4

Youth career
- 2000–2005: Spartaan '20
- 2005–2010: Feyenoord

Senior career*
Years	Team	Apps	(Gls)
2010–2014	Feyenoord	102	(5)
2014–2017	Porto	47	(2)
2016–2017	→ Stoke City (loan)	35	(1)
2017–2021	Stoke City	89	(1)
2020–2021	→ AZ (loan)	27	(1)
2021–2025	AZ	59	(3)
2025–	Sparta Rotterdam	36	(1)

International career
2009	Netherlands U17	3	(0)
2010–2011	Netherlands U19	16	(1)
2012–2013	Netherlands U21	8	(0)
2012–2022	Netherlands	36	(2)
Medal record
Men's football
Representing Netherlands
FIFA World Cup
Third place	2014
- * Club domestic league appearances and goals as of 18:42, 25 October 2026 (UTC)

Rolando Maximiliano "Bruno" Martins Indi (born 8 February 1992) is a professional footballer who plays as a defender for Eredivisie club Sparta Rotterdam. Born in Portugal, he played for the Netherlands national team.

Martins Indi began his career with Dutch club Feyenoord, after progressing through the club's youth teams. He spent four seasons at De Kuip, making 120 appearances before moving back to Portugal in July 2014 and signing for Porto for a fee of €7.7 million. In August 2016, Martins Indi joined Premier League side Stoke City on loan for the 2016–17 season. A year later, he signed a permanent contract with Stoke for a fee of £7 million. After 137 games for the club, he returned to the Eredivisie with AZ in 2021, initially on loan. He departed in 2025, joining Sparta Rotterdam.

A full international for the Netherlands since 2012, he has gained over 30 caps and was part of their squad which finished third at the 2014 FIFA World Cup.

== Early life ==
Born in Barreiro, Portugal, to parents from Guinea-Bissau, Martins Indi moved to Rotterdam, Netherlands, with his family, at the age of three months. He began playing football with youth teams at amateur club Spartaan '20 before joining the Feyenoord Academy at the age of 13.

== Club career ==
=== Feyenoord ===
Martins Indi joined Feyenoord's first team squad as an academy graduate at the start of the 2010–11 season. He made his professional debut for Feyenoord on 19 August 2010, when he was part of the starting line-up in the Europa League home match against Gent (1–0). Three days later, on 22 August 2010, he also made his Eredivisie debut in a 1–1 draw against Heracles Almelo. On 12 September 2010, Martins Indi received a red card for the first time in his club career during stoppage time in a 2–0 loss against NAC Breda. On 17 April 2011, Martins Indi scored his first Eredivisie goal, heading in from a corner during a 6–1 win over Willem II. He, along with Ryo Miyaichi and Georginio Wijnaldum, was praised after the match for a strong overall performance.

In the 2011–12 season, Martins Indi became a regular starter under Feyenoord's new manager Ronald Koeman. On 22 October 2011, he scored his first league goal of the season in a 2–1 loss against VVV-Venlo. On 22 February 2012, Martins Indi signed a new contract that would keep him contracted at De Kuip until the summer of 2016. He played 31 times in 2011–12 as Feyenoord finished in 2nd position behind Ajax. He remained a key player under Koeman in the 2012–13 and 2013–14 campaigns, playing in 39 and 31 games respectively.

=== Porto ===
On 15 July 2014, Martins Indi transferred to Primeira Liga side Porto for €7.7 million. He scored his first goal for Porto in a 2–1 home win over Braga on 5 October 2014. Martins Indi played 37 times in the for Porto as they finished runners-up to Benfica in the league whilst they were also eliminated by Bayern Munich at the quarter-final stage of the UEFA Champions League. In 2015–16, he made 33 appearances as the side finished third and at the end of the campaign he was told by new manager Nuno Espírito Santo he was free to leave the Estádio do Dragão.

=== Stoke City ===
On 31 August 2016, Martins Indi joined Premier League side Stoke City on loan for the 2016–17 season. He made his debut for Stoke on 10 September 2016 against Tottenham Hotspur. Martins Indi formed a defensive partnership with Ryan Shawcross which helped Stoke recover from a poor start to the season. On 31 December 2016, he scored this first goal in English football in a 4–2 defeat away to Chelsea. In May 2017 Martins Indi stated that he wants to turn his loan move into a permanent transfer in the summer. However Mark Hughes admitted that a deal with Porto for Martins Indi had hit an "impasse" and at the end of the season he returned to Porto.

After lengthy negotiations between Stoke and Porto, Martins Indi eventually joined Stoke on 11 August 2017, signing a five-year contract for a fee of £7 million. Martins Indi struggled with injuries in 2017–18, making 19 appearances as Stoke suffered relegation to the EFL Championship. He remained with Stoke in the second tier in 2018–19 playing 41 times as the side finished in 16th position. He scored a rare goal in a 2–0 win against Bolton Wanderers on 2 October 2018. During the season Martins Indi was played out of position at left back by both Gary Rowett and Nathan Jones. Towards the end of the season with Stoke having failed to mount a promotion challenge, Martins Indi admitted that he was contemplating leaving as he looks for a return to the top level.

Martins Indi was linked with a move away from the club in the summer of 2019, but a transfer failed to happen, and he remained with Stoke. Stoke began the season a poor form which saw Jones replaced by Michael O'Neill in November and he moved Martins Indi to left back again. He kept his place in the team for the rest of the 2019–20 season, making 35 appearances helping Stoke avoid relegation and finish in 15th position.

=== AZ ===
On 6 October 2020 Martins Indi joined AZ Alkmaar on loan for the 2020–21 season. Martins Indi played 33 times for AZ helping them finish in third place, qualifying for the UEFA Europa League. He made his move to AZ permanent on 5 July 2021.

In 2021–22, Martins Indi played 45 games in all competitions, scoring twice, as AZ came fifth. The team reached the last 16 of the UEFA Europa Conference League and beat Vitesse in a playoff to qualify for the next season's edition.

=== Sparta Rotterdam ===
On 15 July 2025, Martins Indi joined Eredivisie club Sparta Rotterdam on a two-year deal.

== International career ==
Martins Indi was eligible to play for either Portugal or the Netherlands as he has a dual passport; additionally, he was also eligible for Guinea-Bissau, his parents' nationality. Martins Indi favoured the Dutch team. On 25 October 2009, Martins Indi made his debut for the Netherlands under-17 squad in a 2–1 loss to Colombia at the 2009 U-17 World Cup before coming off for Ouasim Bouy in the 79th minute. This was his only appearance for the Dutch U17 team. On 23 May 2010, Martins Indi was called up to the Netherlands under-19 squad and played the full 90 minutes in a 3–0 victory over Germany.

On 15 August 2012, he played his first full international game against Belgium. Despite the Netherlands losing 4–2, Martins Indi made an impressive debut and helped create both Dutch goals. He became a regular player during qualification for the 2014 FIFA World Cup, scoring his first international goals in 4–1 defeats of Hungary and Romania. In 2013, Martins Indi represented the Netherlands under-21 team at the UEFA Under-21 Championship. His performances saw him included in UEFA's all-star squad for the tournament.

On 13 June 2014, Martins Indi made his World Cup debut in a 5–1 victory over reigning champions Spain. On 18 June, in his second World Cup game against Australia, he was knocked unconscious by Tim Cahill and taken to hospital with a suspected concussion. He recovered faster than expected, and he missed only the final group stage fixture against Chile. The Netherlands eventually finished third in the tournament.

Martins Indi was sent off after 10 minutes of an eventual 2–0 friendly defeat away to Italy on 4 September 2014 after conceding a penalty by fouling Simone Zaza and denying him a goalscoring opportunity. In a UEFA Euro 2016 qualifying match on 3 September the following year, he was again dismissed for striking Kolbeinn Sigþórsson, as the Dutch lost 1–0 at the Amsterdam Arena in Danny Blind's first game in charge.

After five years away, Martins Indi was recalled for UEFA Nations League games against Wales and Poland in June 2022.

== Personal life ==
On 23 March 2012, Martins Indi became a father after his girlfriend, Mecia, gave birth to a daughter. Martins Indi is fluent in Portuguese and still speaks it with his parents. He is an observant Muslim.

== Career statistics ==
=== Club ===
As of match played 25 October 2026

Appearances and goals by club, season and competition
Club	Season	League			National cup		League cup		Europe		Other		Total	
Club	Season	Division	Apps	Goals	Apps	Goals	Apps	Goals	Apps	Goals	Apps	Goals	Apps	Goals
Feyenoord	2010–11	Eredivisie	15	1	2	0	—		2 (Note: Appearances in UEFA Europa League)	0	—		19	1
Feyenoord	2011–12	Eredivisie	29	1	2	0	—		—		—		31	1
Feyenoord	2012–13	Eredivisie	32	1	3	0	—		4 (Note: Appearances in UEFA Champions League)	0	—		39	1
Feyenoord	2013–14	Eredivisie	26	2	3	0	—		2	0	—		31	2
Feyenoord	Total		102	5	10	0	—		8	0	—		120	5
Porto	2014–15	Primeira Liga	24	2	0	0	2	0	11	0	—		37	2
Porto	2015–16	Primeira Liga	23	0	4	0	0	0	7 (Note: One appearance in UEFA Champions League, six appearances in UEFA Europa League)	0	—		34	0
Porto	Total		47	2	4	0	2	0	18	0	—		71	2
Stoke City (loan)	2016–17	Premier League	35	1	1	0	1	0	—		—		37	1
Stoke City	2017–18	Premier League	17	0	0	0	2	0	—		—		19	0
Stoke City	2018–19	Championship	37	1	2	0	2	0	—		—		41	1
Stoke City	2019–20	Championship	33	0	1	0	1	0	—		—		35	0
Stoke City	2020–21	Championship	2	0	0	0	3	0	—		—		5	0
Stoke City	Total		124	2	4	0	9	0	—		—		137	2
Stoke City U23	2017–18	—	—		—		—		—		1 (Note: Appearances in EFL Trophy)	0	1	0
AZ (loan)	2020–21	Eredivisie	27	1	1	0	—		5	1	—		33	2
AZ	2021–22	Eredivisie	31	2	3	0	—		10 (Note: Two appearances in UEFA Europa League, eight appearances in UEFA Europa Conference League)	0	4 (Note: Appearances in Eredivisie European play-offs)	0	48	2
AZ	2022–23	Eredivisie	4	0	0	0	—		7 (Note: Appearances in UEFA Europa Conference League)	0	—		11	0
AZ	2023–24	Eredivisie	14	1	2	0	—		5	0	—		21	1
AZ	2024–25	Eredivisie	10	0	2	0	—		1	0	—		13	0
AZ	Total		86	4	8	0	—		28	1	4	0	126	5
Sparta Rotterdam	2025–26	Eredivisie	27	1	3	1	—		—		—		30	2
Sparta Rotterdam	2026–27	Eredivisie	9	0	0	0	—		—		—		9	0
Sparta Rotterdam	Total		36	1	3	1	—		—		—		39	2
Career total			395	14	29	1	11	0	54	1	5	0	493	16

=== International ===
As of match played 14 June 2022

Appearances and goals by national team and year
National team	Year	Apps	Goals
Netherlands	2012	6	2
Netherlands	2013	6	0
Netherlands	2014	14	0
Netherlands	2015	5	0
Netherlands	2017	3	0
Netherlands	2018	0	0
Netherlands	2019	0	0
Netherlands	2020	0	0
Netherlands	2021	0	0
Netherlands	2022	2	0
Total		36	2

Scores and results list the Netherlands' goal tally first, score column indicates score after each Martins Indi goal.

List of international goals scored by Bruno Martins Indi
No.	Date	Venue	Opponent	Score	Result	Competition
1	11 September 2012	Ferenc Szusza Stadium, Budapest, Hungary	Hungary	2–1	4–1	2014 FIFA World Cup qualification
2	16 October 2012	Arena Națională, Bucharest, Romania	Romania	2–0	4–1	2014 FIFA World Cup qualification

== Honours ==
Netherlands

- FIFA World Cup third place: 2014
