= Ruben Schaken =

Dutch footballer (born 1982)

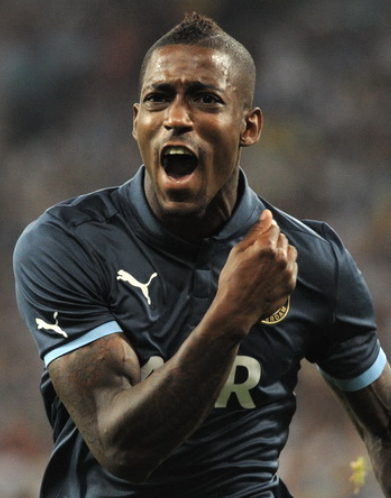
- Schaken with Feyenoord in 2012

Personal information
- Full name: Ruben Schaken
- Date of birth: 3 April 1982 (age 44)
- Place of birth: Amsterdam, Netherlands
- Height: 1.72 m (5 ft 7 1/2 in)
- Position: Right winger

Youth career
- VVA/Spartaan
- Ajax
- DCG
- AZ

Senior career*
Years	Team	Apps	(Gls)
2002–2005	Cambuur	75	(4)
2005–2008	Veendam	103	(34)
2008–2010	VVV-Venlo	64	(11)
2010–2015	Feyenoord	113	(18)
2015	Inter Baku	4	(0)
2015–2017	ADO Den Haag	54	(3)
2018	HBS Craeyenhout	20	(4)
Total		433	(74)

International career^{‡}
2012–2013	Netherlands	7	(2)
- * Club domestic league appearances and goals as of 12 June 2017 ‡ National team caps and goals as of 10 September 2013 (UTC)

Ruben Schaken (Dutch pronunciation: [ˈrybə(n) ˈsxaːkə(n)]; born 3 April 1982) is a Dutch former professional footballer who played as a right winger. He has represented the Netherlands national team on seven occasions between 2012 and 2013, scoring two goals in the process.

== Career ==
=== Early career ===
Having previously trained in the academies of Ajax Amsterdam and AZ Alkmaar, Schaken started his professional career with SC Cambuur where he played 75 matches before being signed by Eerste Divisie side BV Veendam. He spent three seasons with Veendam, making over 100 appearances for the club, and won the Jupiler League Best Player award in the 2007–2008 season. The following season, following the expiration of his contract with Veendam, Schaken was signed by VVV-Venlo on a 2-year contract. In his debut season he helped the team to the league title, thereby earning the club promotion to the Eredivisie.

=== Feyenoord ===
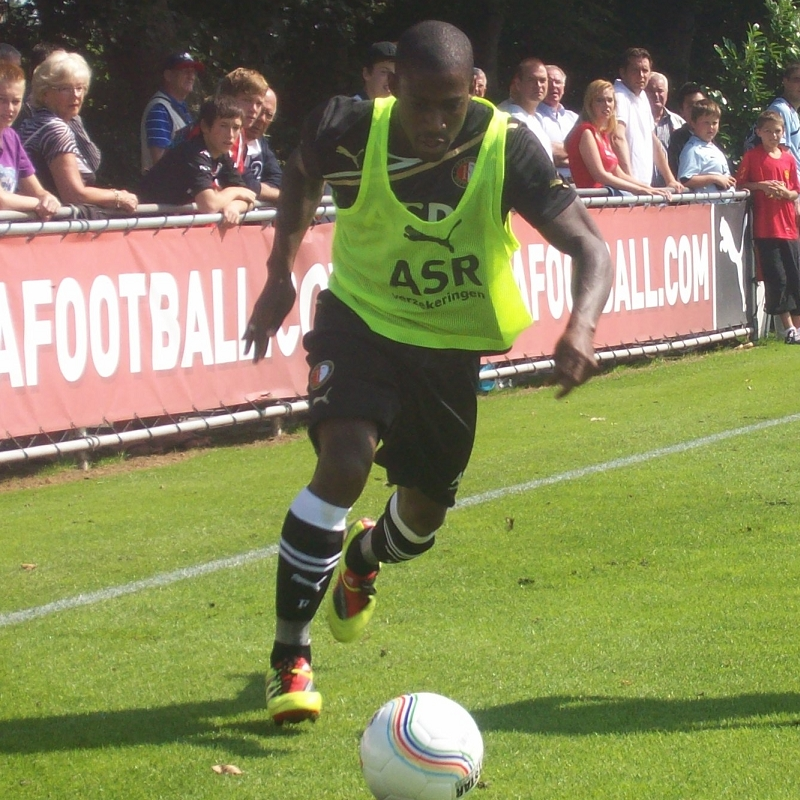
Schaken in an open training session with Feyenoord

Schaken was signed by Feyenoord in March 2010, and he joined the squad on 1 July 2010. The winger made his debut for the club, in the Eredivisie, on 15 August 2010 in a 3–2 defeat to Excelsior. His debut season with Feyenoord was riddled with injuries, preventing him from making a breakthrough into the first eleven.

Prior to the 2011-12 season, Schaken changed his squad number from 7 to 27. He had to wait over a year to score his first goal for the club, opening the scoring in a 4–0 defeat of De Graafschap on 17 September 2011. On 4 December 2011, Schaken scored Feyenoord's second, after Sekou Cissé opened the scoring, in a 2–0 defeat of PSV Eindhoven at De Kuip. Schaken scored goals in four of the last five games of the Eredivisie campaign, against De Graafschap, NAC Breda, Den Haag and Heracles respectively, as Feyenoord secured runners-up spot and entry into the Champions League.

In the third qualifying round for entrance into the group stages of the Champions League, Schaken opened the scoring for Feyenoord at Dynamo Kyiv in the first leg on 31 July 2012; Feyenoord eventually fell 2–1 in the game and 3–1 on aggregate after a 0–1 loss in the Netherlands. Schaken scored his first goal of the Eredivisie campaign on the opening matchday on 18 August, netting a late equalizer against Heerenveen, who had taken the lead from the penalty spot following a red card from Joris Mathijsen. On 25 November, Schaken scored a late goal for Feyenoord, as the Rotterdam club secured a 2–0 away victory at AZ Alkmaar.

On 24 February 2013, Schaken equalized for Feyenoord after Jeremain Lens had put PSV in front; and a 68th-minute strike from Graziano Pellè completed the comeback, securing a 2–1 victory for the Rotterdam-based club. He scored Feyenoord's fifth goal against Heracles on 28 April, receiving the ball from John Goossens and slotting it home past back-up 'keeper Brian van Loo; Feyenoord would eventually win the game 6–0.

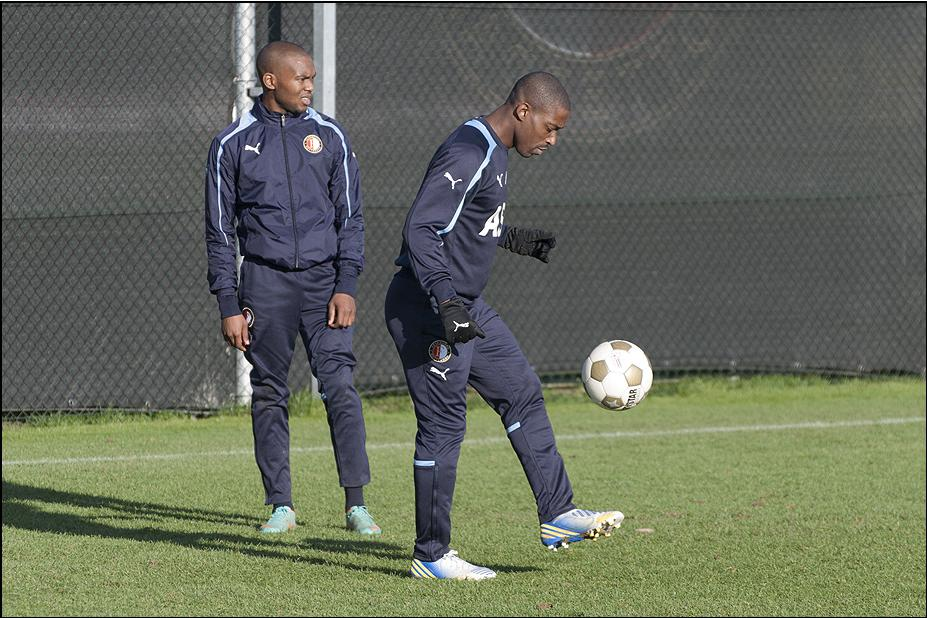
Ruben Schaken (right) with Feyenoord

After a bye in the first round, Feyenoord started the 2013–14 KNVB Cup on 26 September 2013, at home against FC Dordrecht in the second round. They won the game 3–0; Graziano Pellè scored first as Schaken and Samuel Armenteros added a goal each to the scoreline in the second half. In the first Eredivisie game following the winter break, Schaken scored two goals in a 5–2 away win against FC Utrecht 19 January 2014.

On 28 August 2014, Schaken scored Feyenoord's second goal as the Dutch side defeated FC Zorya Luhansk 4–3 in the second-leg of their UEFA Europa League play-off round and won 5–4 on aggregate to advance to the group stage.

On 5 January 2015, Schaken dissolved his contract with Feyenoord after having lost prospect with the club.

=== Inter Baku ===
On 16 January 2015, Azerbaijani side Inter Baku announced the signing of Schaken on an 18-month contract. He made his debut on 30 January in a 0–0 draw with Sumgayit. It was one of only four appearances Schaken made for Inter before the club's main sponsor withdrew sponsorship, resulting in the club being unable to pay the salaries of a number of its players. Inter's failure to pay players' salaries resulted in Schaken leaving the club after just six months to join ADO Den Haag. He later successfully approached FIFA in order to recover the monies owed to him by Inter.

=== ADO Den Haag ===
After only six-months in Azerbaijan, Schaken signed a two-year contract with ADO Den Haag on 22 July 2015.

=== Retirement ===
Schaken moved to lower league side HBS Craeyenhout in January 2018 after having been a free agent for six months. He made his debut in a 4–0 away win over RKVV Westlandia.

Schaken announced his retirement on 17 December 2018, six months before his contract with HBS expired, and said that he would look to obtain his coaching qualifications directly after retiring. He is now a happy owner of surinamese restaurant "Juliaantje" in Almere Buiten.

== International career ==
Born in the Netherlands, Schaken is of Surinamese descent. On 22 August 2012, he was selected for the 2014 World Cup qualifiers for the Dutch squad. Schaken made his debut for Oranje, aged 30, on 12 October 2012 against Andorra, scoring a goal in the Netherlands' 3–0 home win. With this appearance, he became the 725th player to represent the Netherlands at international level. He played the full game in the Netherlands disappointing 0–0 draw with rivals Germany on 14 November 2012. Schaken ensured the Netherlands continued their perfect record for World Cup qualification, netting the final goal in a 3–0 defeat of Estonia on 22 March 2013. Schaken's goal against Estonia was the 1500th scored by an Oranje player at the senior international level.

== Playing style ==
The Feyenoord website describes Schaken as "a speedy winger who can provide tempting crosses from either flank"; while former Feyenoord manager Ronald Koeman regularly judged Schaken "to be his most exciting attacker."

== Outside football ==
=== Personal life ===
In September 2011, Schaken started a football school in Lelystad for children between the ages of 8 and 16, focusing on the development of technique and having fun.

=== Biography ===
In November 2017, Schaken published his biography, Ruben Schaken: einde aan de bullshit, ghost-written by journalist Peter van Drunen.

== Statistics ==
=== Club ===
Club performance			League		Cup		Continental		Total	
Season	Club	League	Apps	Goals	Apps	Goals	Apps	Goals	Apps	Goals
Netherlands			League		KNVB Cup		Europe		Total	
2002–03	Cambuur Leeuwarden	Eerste Divisie	13	3	0	0	–		13	3
2003–04	Cambuur Leeuwarden	Eerste Divisie	33	1	0	0	–		33	1
2004–05	Cambuur Leeuwarden	Eerste Divisie	29	0	0	0	–		29	0
2005–06	BV Veendam	Eerste Divisie	38	6	0	0	–		38	6
2006–07	BV Veendam	Eerste Divisie	33	4	0	0	–		33	4
2007–08	BV Veendam	Eerste Divisie	32	6	0	0	–		32	6
2008–09	VVV-Venlo	Eerste Divisie	32	8	0	0	–		32	8
2009–10	VVV-Venlo	Eredivisie	32	3	2	0	–		34	3
2010–11	Feyenoord	Eredivisie	11	0	1	0	2	0	14	0
2011–12	Feyenoord	Eredivisie	32	6	1	0	–		33	6
2012–13	Feyenoord	Eredivisie	31	4	3	0	4	1	38	5
2013–14	Feyenoord	Eredivisie	32	4	4	1	2	0	38	5
2014–15	Feyenoord	Eredivisie	7	1	1	0	5	1	13	2
Azerbaijan			League		Azerbaijan Cup		Europe		Total	
2014–15	Inter Baku	Premyer Liqası	4	0	0	0	-		4	0
Netherlands			League		KNVB Cup		Europe		Total	
2015–16	ADO Den Haag	Eredivisie	8	1	0	0	–		8	1
Total	Netherlands		363	47	12	1	13	2	388	50
Total	Azerbaijan		4	0	0	0	0	0	4	0
Career total			359	46	12	1	13	2	384	49

Statistics accurate as of last match played on 3 October 2015.

=== International performance ===
Dutch national team
Year	Apps	Goals
2012	2	1
2013	5	1
Total	7	2

Statistics accurate as of matches played on 10 September 2013.

=== International goals ===
Scores and results list Netherlands' goal tally first.

#	Date	Venue	Opponent	Score	Result	Competition
1.	12 October 2012	De Kuip, Rotterdam, Netherlands	Andorra	3–0	3–0	2014 World Cup qualifier
2.	22 March 2013	Amsterdam Arena, Amsterdam, Netherlands	Estonia	3–0	3–0	2014 World Cup qualifier

== Honours ==
=== Club ===
- VVV-Venlo
  - Eerste Divisie: 2008–09

=== Individual ===
- Eerste Divisie Player of the Year: 2007–08
