= Karim El Ahmadi =

Footballer (born 1985)

Karim El-Ahmadi
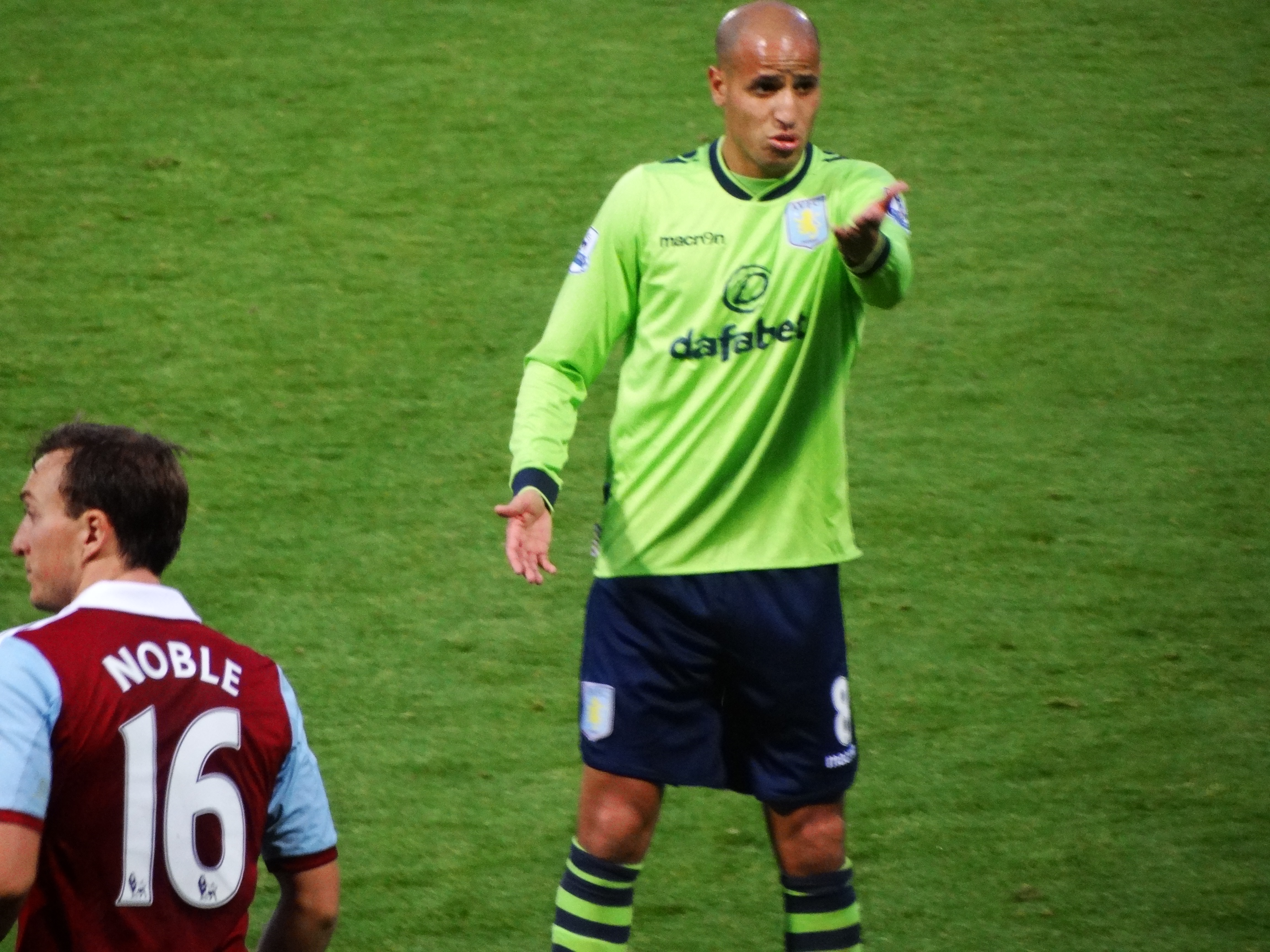
- El Ahmadi with Aston Villa in 2013

Personal information
- Full name: Karim El Ahmadi Aroussi
- Date of birth: 27 January 1985 (age 41)
- Place of birth: Enschede, Netherlands
- Height: 1.80 m (5 ft 11 in)
- Position: Defensive midfielder

Youth career
- UDI Enschede
- Twente

Senior career*
Years	Team	Apps	(Gls)
2004–2008	Twente	89	(3)
2008–2012	Feyenoord	94	(4)
2011	→ Al Ahli (loan)	10	(1)
2012–2014	Aston Villa	51	(3)
2014–2018	Feyenoord	122	(10)
2018–2022	Al-Ittihad	90	(0)
Total		456	(21)

International career^{‡}
2008–2019	Morocco	66	(1)
- * Club domestic league appearances and goals as of 12:14, 2 May 2021 (UTC) ‡ National team caps and goals as of 15:18, 12 July 2019 (UTC)

Karim El-Ahmadi Aroussi (Arabic: كريم الأحمدي; born 27 January 1985) is a former professional footballer who played as a defensive midfielder. El-Ahmadi was born in the Netherlands and played for FC Twente and Feyenoord before moving to the Premier League with Aston Villa in 2012 and subsequently returning to Feyenoord in September 2014 and before moving to the Al-Ittihad in the Saudi Professional League in 2018. Born in the Netherlands, he represented Morocco internationally.

== Early life ==
El Ahmadi was born and raised in Enschede, Overijssel, Netherlands. His parents are both Moroccan, making him eligible to acquire the Moroccan citizenship and represent the Morocco national football team.

== Club career ==
=== UDI ===
At the age of 9, El Ahmadi started playing football at local Enschede club UDI. He got noticed quickly by scouts from Twente and was invited to join their academy.

=== FC Twente ===
On 21 March 2004, El Ahmadi made his official debut in Twente's first team in the away match against FC Utrecht (2–0), where he played 90 minutes. El Ahmadi able to play 2 more games against Groningen and RBC Roosendaal but with the return of On the last match of the season in a match against RKC Waalwijk on 9 May 2004, El Ahmadi provided as assist for Kim Christensen to make it 3–2 but RKC Waalwijk scored in the late minutes to make 3–3.

The following season 2004–05, El Ahmadi began coming on as a substitute for the next two games against Ajax and RKC Waalwijk at the start of the season. In a match against Heerenveen on 28 August 2004, El Ahmadi played for 90 minutes and setting up a goal for Blaise Nkufo in a 4–1 victory. On 13 November 2004, El Ahmadi scored his first goal for the club in a 2–0 win over N.E.C. At the end of the season, El Ahmadi played 16 league games, playing mostly on the wing positions.

The following 2005–06 season, El Ahmadi found himself out of the first team and made 8 appearances following the arrival of Kennedy Bakırcıoğlu and Patrick Gerritsen. In the following 2006–07 season, El Ahmadi suffered a knee injury in a UEFA Cup match against Estonian side Levadia Tallinn in a 1–1 draw. After recovering, El Ahmadi returned to the reserve and by mid-November, El Ahmadi played his first match of the season, coming on as a substitute for Wout Brama in a 7–1 win over Groningen. After the match, El Ahmadi began establishing himself in the starting eleven, playing in the right side of the support. In late-October, El Ahmadi signed a contract with the club, until 2009, with an options to extend until 2011. On 3 February 2007, El Ahmadi scored the first goal in a match with Twente won 2–1 over Excelsior. On 8 April 2007, El Ahmadi scored Twente's only goal in the game in a 1–1 draw against Heracles. El Ahmadi played a single game for the club from 13 November 2006 to 29 April 2007. At the end of season 2006–07, the club finished fourth which resulted in entering the UEFA Cup.

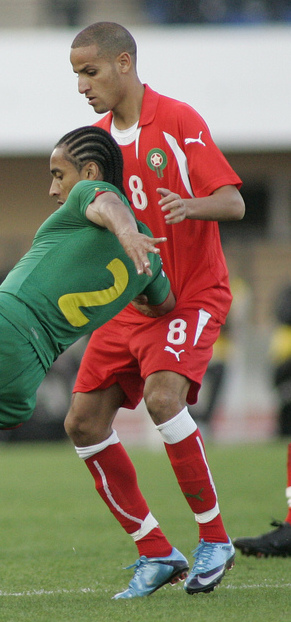
El Ahmadi attempted tackling on Benoît Assou-Ekotto during a match against Cameroon.

The following 2007–08 season, Twente began suffering after the club sold Bakırcıoğlu to Ajax and Sharbel Touma sold to German side Borussia Mönchengladbach. Even worse, Patrick Gerritsen suffered a leg injury, leading El Ahmadi to get more playing time in the starting line-up. In late July, El Ahmadi signed a contract extension which will keep him until 2011. At the end of 2007–08 season, El Ahmadi made 33 appearances, primarily playing as a defender. At the end of the season FC Twente qualified for the UEFA Champions League.

=== Feyenoord ===
On 16 April 2008, it was announced that El Ahmadi signed a five-year deal with Dutch club Feyenoord for a transfer fee of €5 million (£4.3 million).

After a groin injury had initially kept him from playing he made his debut on 2 October 2008, coming on as a substitute for Luigi Bruins in the UEFA Cup-match against Kalmar FF, which Feyenoord won 2–1. He made his debut in the starting line-up against NEC before coming off after 58 minutes, and the game ended in a 0–2 home defeat on 5 October 2008. On 9 November 2008, El Ahmadi scored his first goal for the club in a 5–2 win over Utrecht. On 22 February 2009, El Ahmadi scored his second goal for the club in a 2–0 win over De Graafschap. Since making his debut, he played regularly in the starting line-up which led to interest from a German team Hamburger SV. In early April El Ahmadi, suffered an ankle injury before making his return in the last game of the season, a 3–2 loss against Roda JC. At the end of the season, he was linked to league rivals PSV Eindhoven, however, no offer was made from the club.

In the following 2009–10 season under manager Mario Been, El Ahmadi was deployed in central midfield with the rise of youngsters Leroy Fer and Jonathan de Guzmán. Playing in this position, he played 26 league games. In the quarter-final of the KNVB Cup, he scored a brace and set up a goal for captain Giovanni van Bronckhorst in a 3–0 win over PSV Eindhoven on 27 January 2010. Feyenoord would later on reach the final of the KNVB Cup, which they lost 6–1 on aggregate to Ajax.

After a loan spell at Al Ahli Club, El Ahmadi returned to feyenoord. Under manager Ronald Koeman he managed to become a regular in the starting line-up as a midfielder forming a partnership with Jordy Clasie and Otman Bakkal. On 11 September 2011, he scored his first goal since 2009 in a 3–1 win over NAC Breda. On 16 October 2011, El Ahmadi scored again this season in a 4–0 win over VVV-Venlo.

==== Loan to Al Ahli Club ====
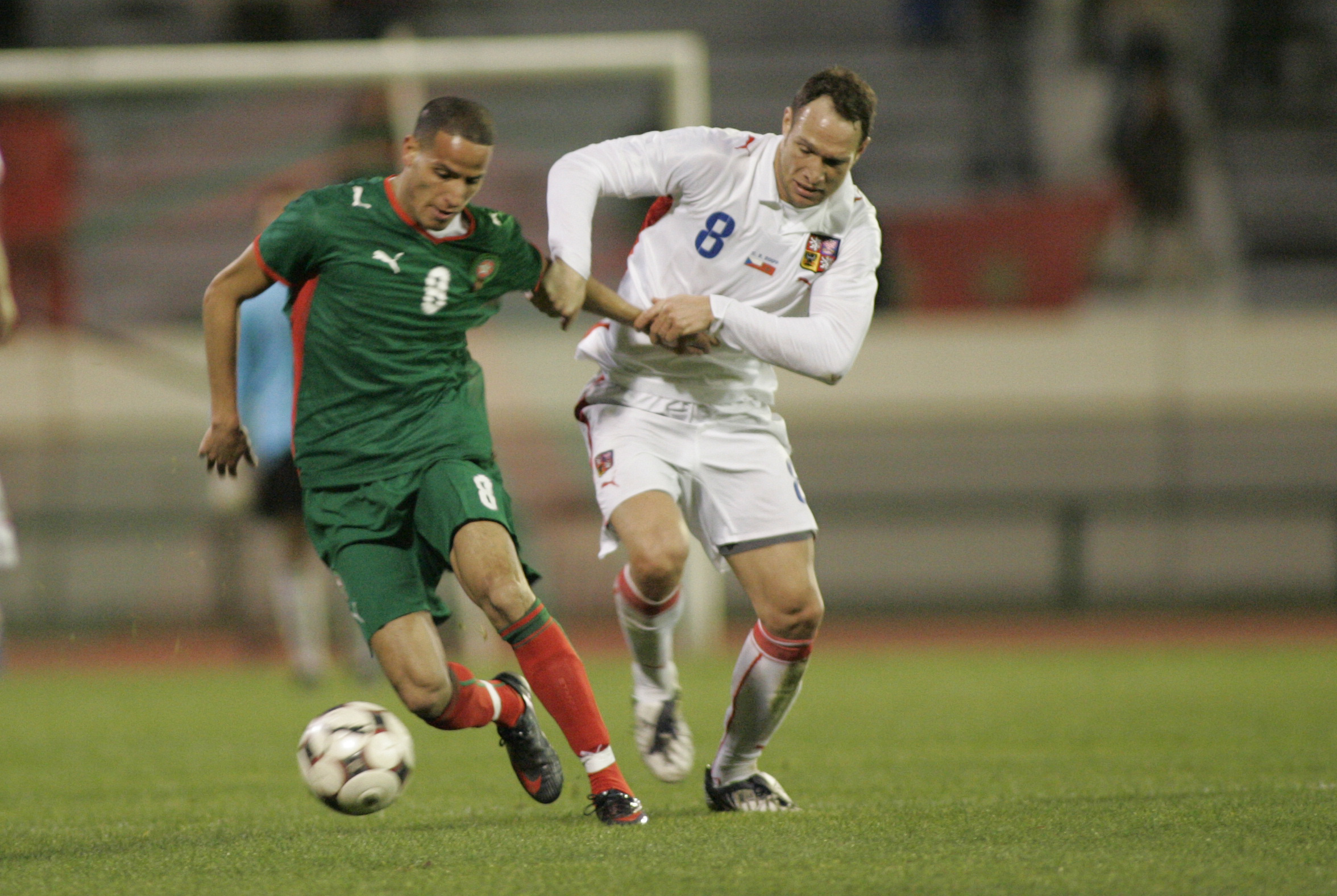
El Ahmadi clashing with Jan Polák during a match against Czech Republic.

After making 15 league appearances in the 2010–11 season at Feyenoord, El Ahmadi joined an UAE team Al Ahli Club on a six-month loan deal in order for the club to boost funds required to sign a new striker on 25 January 2011. On 4 February 2011, he made his debut for the club in a 0–0 draw against Al Dhafra S.C.C. On 24 March 2011, he scored his first goal in the UAE League with a 2–2 draw against Ittihad Kalba. During his loan El Ahmadi appeared in 10 games and scored one goal. At the end of the season, he stated he wanted to play European Football again next season and that the level of competition at Al Ahli was 'too low' compared to the 'weakest teams in the Dutch league'. The chairman of Al Ahli football club, Abdullah Saeed Al Naboudah, said the club wanted to sign El Ahmadi on a permanent basis, however, the two clubs failed to reach an agreement.

=== Aston Villa ===
On 26 June 2012, both the British and Dutch media strongly linked El Ahmadi with a transfer to Aston Villa of England's Premier League. Soon after, new Villa manager Paul Lambert confirmed his interest in the player. On 2 July 2012, El Ahmadi completed his transfer from Feyenoord to Aston Villa for an undisclosed fee believed to be around £2,000,000. This made him Lambert's first signing as Aston Villa manager, and Aston Villa's second signing of the summer (following Australia international Brett Holman's move from AZ). On 14 July 2012, El Ahmadi made his debut in a 2–1 win against Burton Albion at the Pirelli Stadium, demonstrating a man of the match performance. On 25 August, he made his home debut and scored a spectacular strike in the 74th minute, in Aston Villa's 3–1 defeat to Everton. Having made a good start despite losing opening two Premier League games of the season, El Ahmadi was voted the club's player of the month of August. Later in the season, El Ahmadi was left out of the squad due to injury and made 24 appearances across all competitions. El Ahmadi started the 2013–14 season in midfield, including a goal in a 3–2 win against Manchester City.

=== Return to Feyenoord ===
On 1 September 2014, El Ahmadi returned to Feyenoord for an undisclosed transfer fee, signing a contract that would keep him at De Kuip until 2017.

On 22 April 2018 he played as Feyenoord won the 2017–18 KNVB Cup final 3–0 against AZ Alkmaar.

=== Al-Ittihad ===
On 9 July 2018, El Ahmadi signed a two-year contract with Saudi Arabian side Al-Ittihad.

== International career ==
El Ahmadi played for the Dutch national youth teams, but opted to represent Morocco at the 2005 FIFA World Youth Championship in the Netherlands.

In May 2018 he was named in Morocco's 23-man squad for the 2018 World Cup in Russia.

== Personal life ==
El Ahmadi is a practicing Muslim.

== Career statistics ==
=== Club ===
As of match played 16 April 2021

Appearances and goals by club, season and competition
Club	Season	League			National cup		Continental		Other		Total	
Club	Season	Division	Apps	Goals	Apps	Goals	Apps	Goals	Apps	Goals	Apps	Goals
Twente	2003–04	Eredivisie	7	0	0	0	0	0			7	0
Twente	2004–05	Eredivisie	19	1	2	0	0	0			21	1
Twente	2005–06	Eredivisie	8	0	1	0	0	0			9	0
Twente	2006–07	Eredivisie	22	2	2	0	2 (Note: Appearance(s) in UEFA Europa League)	0			26	2
Twente	2007–08	Eredivisie	33	0	1	0	2	0			36	0
Twente	Total		89	3	6	0	4	0			99	3
Feyenoord	2008–09	Eredivisie	22	2	2	0	5	0	0	0	29	2
Feyenoord	2009–10	Eredivisie	26	0	6	2	0	0	0	0	32	2
Feyenoord	2010–11	Eredivisie	15	0	0	0	1	0	0	0	16	0
Feyenoord	2011–12	Eredivisie	31	2	2	1	0	0	0	0	33	3
Feyenoord	Total		94	4	10	3	6	0	0	0	110	7
Al-Ahli FC (loan)	2010–11	UAE Pro-League	10	1	0	0	0	0	0	0	10	1
Aston Villa	2012–13	Premier League	20	1	3	0	–		–		23	1
Aston Villa	2013–14	Premier League	31	2	2	0	–		–		33	2
Aston Villa	Total		51	3	5	0	–		–		56	3
Feyenoord	2014–15	Eredivisie	29	2	0	0	7	2	0	0	36	2
Feyenoord	2015–16	Eredivisie	32	1	6	0	0	0	–		38	1
Feyenoord	2016–17	Eredivisie	30	5	2	1	4	0	1 (Note: Appearance in Johan Cruyff Shield)	0	37	6
Feyenoord	2017–18	Eredivisie	31	2	5	0	4 (Note: Appearances in UEFA Champions League)	0	1	0	41	2
Feyenoord	Total		122	10	13	1	15	2	2	0	152	11
Al-Ittihad	2018–19	Saudi Pro League	24	0	5	0	2 (Note: Appearance(s) in Arab Club Champions Cup)	1	1 (Note: Appearance(s) in Saudi Super Cup)	1	32	2
Al-Ittihad	2019–20	Saudi Pro League	26	0	2	1	5	0	0	0	33	1
Al-Ittihad	2020–21	Saudi Pro League	22	0	2	0	1	0	0	0	25	0
Al-Ittihad	Total		72	0	9	1	8	1	1	1	90	3
Career total			438	21	43	5	33	3	3	1	507	28

=== International ===
As of match played 12 July 2019

Morocco
Year	Apps	Goals
2008	6	0
2009	7	1
2010	4	0
2011	2	0
2012	4	0
2013	2	0
2014	3	0
2015	4	0
2016	6	0
2017	10	0
2018	12	0
2019	6	0
Total	66	1

=== International goals ===
Scores and results list Morocco's goal tally first.

No.	Date	Venue	Opponent	Score	Result	Competition
1.	12 August 2009	Prince Moulay Abdellah Stadium, Rabat, Morocco	Congo	1–1	1–1	Friendly

== Honours ==
Twente

- KNVB Cup runner-up: 2003–04

Feyenoord

- Eredivisie: 2016–17
- KNVB Cup: 2015–16, 2017–18; runner-up: 2009–10
- Johan Cruijff Shield: 2017

Al Ittihad

- King's Cup runner-up: 2019
- Saudi Super Cup runner-up: 2019

Individual

- Dutch Footballer of the Year: 2016–17
