= 2010–11 Feyenoord season =

Feyenoord
2010–11 season
- Chairman: Dick van Well
- Manager: Mario Been
- Stadium: De Kuip
- Eredivisie: 10th
- KNVB Cup: Third round
- Europa League: Play-off round
- Top goalscorer: League: Luc Castaignos (15); All: Luc Castaignos (15)
- Average home league attendance: 42,124
Home colours	Away colours	Third colours

The 2010–11 season is Feyenoord's fifty-fifth consecutive season in the Dutch Eredivisie. This season, Feyenoord competes in three competitions; the Eredivisie, the KNVB Cup and the Europa League.

== Competitions ==
=== Overall ===
Competition	Started round	Final position / round	First match	Last match
Eredivisie	—	Tenth	8 August 2010	15 May 2011
KNVB Cup	Third round	Third round	22 September 2010	22 September 2010
UEFA Europa League	Play-off round	Play-off round	19 August 2010	26 August 2010

Source: Competitions

=== Eredivisie ===
==== League table ====
Pos	Team	Pld	W	D	L	GF	GA	GD	Pts	Qualification or relegation
8	Heracles	34	14	7	13	65	56	+9	49	Qualification to European competition play-offs
9	Utrecht	34	13	8	13	55	51	+4	47	
10	Feyenoord	34	12	8	14	53	54	−1	44	
11	NEC	34	10	13	11	57	56	+1	43	
12	Heerenveen	34	10	11	13	60	54	+6	41	

Source: eredivisie.nl (in Dutch)
Rules for classification: 1) points; 2) goal difference; 3) number of goals scored.

==== Results summary ====
Overall								Home						Away					
Pld	W	D	L	GF	GA	GD	Pts	W	D	L	GF	GA	GD	W	D	L	GF	GA	GD
34	12	8	14	53	54	−1	44	10	3	4	36	16	+20	2	5	10	17	38	−21

Source: Matches

==== Results by round ====
Round	1	2	3	4	5	6	7	8	9	10	11	12	13	14	15	16	17	18	19	20	21	22	23	24	25	26	27	28	29	30	31	32	33	34
Ground	H	A	A	H	A	H	A	A	H	A	H	A	H	H	A	H	A	H	A	H	A	A	H	A	H	A	H	A	H	A	H	H	A	H
Result	W	L	D	W	L	L	L	D	L	L	W	L	D	D	L	W	D	W	L	L	L	D	W	D	W	W	W	L	L	W	W	W	L	D
Position	3	6	9	5	8	10	13	13	15	15	15	15	14	14	16	15	14	13	13	14	15	15	14	15	13	13	11	12	13	11	10	10	10	10

Source: worldfootball.net
A = Away; H = Home; W = Win; D = Draw; L = Loss; P = Postponed

==== Matches ====
8 August 2010 1	Feyenoord	3–1	Utrecht	Rotterdam
14:30	Biseswar (yellow card) 49'; Schut 52' (o.g.); Bruins 64'; Fer 75'	Report	Van Wolfswinkel 12'; Wuytens (yellow card) 73'	Stadium: De Kuip; Attendance: 35,000; Referee: Kevin Blom

15 August 2010 2	Excelsior	3–2	Feyenoord	Rotterdam
12:30	Fernandez 29', 90+3'; Bovenberg 77'	Report	Vlaar 41'; Nelom 74' (o.g.)	Stadium: Woudestein; Attendance: 3,600; Referee: Richard Liesveld

22 August 2010 3	Heracles Almelo	1–1	Feyenoord	Almelo
14:30	Looms 15'	Report	Wijnaldum 71'	Stadium: Polman Stadion; Attendance: 8,500; Referee: Pol van Boekel

29 August 2010 4	Feyenoord	4–0	Vitesse Arnhem	Rotterdam
14:30	Leerdam 20'; Fer 31'; Castaignos 74'; Wijnaldum 83' (pen.)	Report		Stadium: De Kuip; Attendance: 43,000; Referee: Reinold Wiedemeijer

12 September 2010 5	NAC Breda	2–0	Feyenoord	Breda
12:30	Schilder 84', 90+2'		Martins Indi (red card) 90+1'	Stadium: Rat Verlegh Stadion; Attendance: 17,850; Referee: Ruud Bossen

19 September 2010 6	Feyenoord	1–2	Ajax	Rotterdam
12:30	Bahia 80'		de Jong 40'; El Hamdaoui 56'	Stadium: De Kuip; Attendance: 43,000; Referee: Kevin Blom

26 September 2010 7	NEC	3–0	Feyenoord	Nijmegen
14:30	Schøne 19' ten Voorde 83'; Nuytinck 90+2'			Stadium: McDOS Goffertstadion; Attendance: 12,400; Referee: Björn Kuipers

3 October 2010 8	De Graafschap	1–1	Feyenoord	Doetinchem
14:30	Bargas 20'		Bruins 31' (pen.)	Stadium: De Vijverberg; Attendance: 12,550; Referee: Eric Braamhaar

16 October 2010 9	Feyenoord	0–1	FC Twente	Rotterdam
20:45			Landzaat 78'	Stadium: De Kuip; Attendance: 43,000; Referee: Ruud Bossen

24 October 2010 10	PSV	10–0	Feyenoord	Eindhoven
14:30	Reis 24', 47', 59'; Martins Indi 39' (o.g.); Toivonen 49'; Lens 55', 87'; Dzsudzsák 62', 77' (pen.); Engelaar 69'		Leerdam (yellow card) 27' (yellow-red card) 34'	Stadium: Philips Stadion; Attendance: 33,900; Referee: Bas Nijhuis

27 October 2010 11	Feyenoord	3–0	VVV-Venlo	Rotterdam
21:00	Wijnaldum 65', 90+1'; Bahia 83'			Stadium: De Kuip; Attendance: 41,600; Referee: Ed Janssen

31 October 2010 12	AZ	2–1	Feyenoord	Alkmaar
14:30	Holman 45'; Pellè 61'		Castaignos 69'	Stadium: AFAS Stadion; Attendance: 16,576; Referee: Danny Makkelie

7 November 2010 13	Feyenoord	1–1	Roda JC Kerkrade	Rotterdam
14:30	Castaignos 87'		Junker 24'	Stadium: De Kuip; Attendance: 43,000; Referee: Pieter Vink

21 November 2010 14	Feyenoord	2–2	SC Heerenveen	Rotterdam
16:30	Castaignos 11'; Cabral 81'		Väyrynen 53'; Elm 75'	Stadium: De Kuip; Attendance: 42,000; Referee: Richard Liesveld

28 November 2010 15	FC Groningen	2–0	Feyenoord	Groningen
14:30	Matavž 13', 84'			Stadium: Euroborg; Attendance: 21,905; Referee: van Hulten

5 December 2010 16	Feyenoord	2–1	ADO Den Haag	Rotterdam
12:30	Radosavljević 47' (o.g.); Castaignos 59'		Bulykin 45+2'	Stadium: De Kuip; Attendance: 42,000; Referee: Wiedemeijer

12 December 2010 17	Willem II	1–1	Feyenoord	Tilburg
12:30	van Haaren 84' (o.g.)		Leerdam 37'	Stadium: Koning Willem II Stadion; Attendance: 11,600; Referee: Bossen

18 December 2010 18	Feyenoord	1–0	Excelsior	Rotterdam
14:30	Castaignos 22'			Stadium: De Kuip; Attendance: 42,000; Referee: Makkelie

15 January 2011 19	Ajax	2–0	Feyenoord	Amsterdam
20:45	Alderweireld 31'; Sulejmani 77' (pen.)			Stadium: Amsterdam ArenA; Attendance: 51,322; Referee: Vink

22 January 2011 20	Feyenoord	0–1	De Graafschap	Rotterdam
20:45			Broekhof 88'	Stadium: De Kuip; Attendance: 41,000; Referee: van Sichem

30 January 2011 21	FC Twente	2–1	Feyenoord	Enschede
14:30	Brama 76'; Ruiz 90+1'		Swerts 51'	Stadium: De Grolsch Veste; Attendance: 23,800; Referee: Liesveld

6 February 2011 22	Vitesse	1–1	Feyenoord	Arnhem
12:30	Aissati 63' (pen.)		Castaignos 56'	Stadium: GelreDome; Attendance: 15,441; Referee: Kuipers

12 February 2011 23	Feyenoord	2–1	Heracles Almelo	Rotterdam
19:45	Miyaichi 18'; Biseswar 33'		Fledderus 45+1'	Stadium: de Kuip; Attendance: 47,000; Referee: Wiedemeijer

20 February 2011 24	ADO Den Haag	2–2	Feyenoord	The Hague
12:30	Vicento 81'; Bulykin 85'		Castaignos 30', 38'	Stadium: Kyocera Stadion; Attendance: 15,000; Referee: Makkelie

27 February 2011 25	Feyenoord	5–1	FC Groningen	Rotterdam
14:30	Wijnaldum 23', 31', 48' (pen.), 83' (pen.); Vlaar 87'		Pedersen 41'	Stadium: De Kuip; Attendance: 43,000; Referee: Nijhuis

6 March 2011 26	SC Heerenveen	0–1	Feyenoord	Heerenveen
14:30			Castaignos 78'	Stadium: Abe Lenstra Stadion; Attendance: 26,000; Referee: Liesveld

13 March 2011 27	Feyenoord	2–1	NAC Breda	Rotterdam
14:30	Castaignos 29' de Vrij 88'		Jenner 59'	Stadium: De Kuip; Attendance: 41,000; Referee: Braamhaar

20 March 2011 28	Roda JC Kerkrade	3–0	Feyenoord	Kerkrade
14:30	Hadouir 7'; Junker 43'; Biseswar 90' (o.g.)			Stadium: Parkstad Limburg Stadion; Attendance: 17,155; Referee: Blom

2 April 2011 29	Feyenoord	0–1	AZ	Rotterdam
20:45	Swerts (red card) 59'		Benschop 44'	Stadium: De Kuip; Attendance: 47,500; Referee: Vink

10 April 2011 30	FC Utrecht	0–4	Feyenoord	Utrecht
14:30			Fer 8'; Leerdam 32'; Biseswar 58'; Wijnaldum 65'	Stadium: Stadion Galgenwaard; Attendance: 19,000; Referee: Nijhuis

17 April 2011 31	Feyenoord	6–1	Willem II	Rotterdam
16:30	Wijnaldum 27', 74'; Miyaichi 29', 81'; Martins Indi 55'; Castaignos 57' (pen.)		Lasnik 20'	Stadium: De Kuip; Attendance: 47,000; Referee: (Belgium) Dierick

24 April 2011 32	Feyenoord	3–1	PSV	Rotterdam
14:30	Wijnaldum 27', 63'; Castaignos 79'		Engelaar (red card) 53'; Toivonen 60'	Stadium: De Kuip; Attendance: 46,000; Referee: Kuipers

1 May 2011 33	VVV-Venlo	3–2	Feyenoord	Venlo
14:30	Musa 34', 71'; Uchebo 78'		Wijnaldum 65'; Castaignos 75'	Stadium: De Koel; Attendance: 8,000; Referee: Liesveld

15 May 2011 34	Feyenoord	1–1	NEC	Rotterdam
14:30	Castaignos 43'		Schöne 12'	Stadium: De Kuip; Attendance: 39,500; Referee: van Boekel

=== KNVB Cup ===
22 September 2010	Feyenoord	1 – 1 (a.e.t) (3 – 4 p)	Roda JC Kerkrade	Rotterdam, Netherlands
20:45	Cissé 83'		Delorge 63'	Stadium: De Kuip; Attendance: 35,000; Referee: Bas Nijhuis
	Penalties
	Wijnaldum (penalty scored); Smolov (penalty scored); Bruins (penalty missed); Leerdam (penalty missed); Fer (penalty scored); Schaken (penalty missed)		(penalty scored) Vormer; (penalty scored) Janssen; (penalty missed) Sutchuin; (penalty missed) Delorge; (penalty scored) Junker; (penalty scored) Huysegems

=== Europa League ===
19 August 2010	Feyenoord (Netherlands)	1–0	(Belgium) Gent	Rotterdam, Netherlands
19:15	Fer 78'	Report		Stadium: De Kuip; Attendance: 34,000; Referee: Bruno Paixão

26 August 2010	Gent (Belgium)	2–0 (2–1 agg.)	(Netherlands) Feyenoord	Ghent, Belgium
20:00	Yaya 34'; Coulibaly 61'	Report		Stadium: Jules Ottenstadion; Attendance: 10,000; Referee: Eduardo Iturralde González

=== Friendlies ===
3 July 2010	VVSB (Netherlands)	0–10	(Netherlands) Feyenoord	Noordwijkerhout, Netherlands
16:00		Report	El Ahmadi 21'; Cabral 27'; Wijnaldum 30', 38'; Schaken 43', 45', 78'; Mokotjo 57', 85'; Castaignos 70'	Stadium: Sportpark de Boekhorst; Attendance: 3,000; Referee: Pieter Vink

6 July 2010	Voorschoten '97 (Netherlands)	0–11	(Netherlands) Feyenoord	Voorschoten, Netherlands
17:00		Report	Wijnaldum 16'; Smolov 31', 36'; Biseswar 54'; Bruins 59', 63', 74', 78', 83', 85'; Van Haaren 70'	Stadium: Sportpark Adegeest; Attendance: 2,000; Referee: Danny Makkelie

10 July 2010	Feyenoord (Netherlands)	3–0	(Netherlands) Sportclub Feyenoord	Rotterdam, Netherlands
15:00	Bruins 7'; El Ahmadi 19'; Bahia 37'	Report		Stadium: De Kuip; Attendance: 30,000; Referee: Raymond van Meenen

14 July 2010	Zeeuws Elftal (Netherlands)	0–0	(Netherlands) Feyenoord	Hoek, Netherlands
19:00		Report		Stadium: Sportpark Denoek; Attendance: 3,200; Referee: A.L. van de Ketterij

17 July 2010	BVV Barendrecht (Netherlands)	1–4	(Netherlands) Feyenoord	Barendrecht, Netherlands
16:00	De Borst 30'	Report	Wijnaldum 18'; Bruins 33', 68'; Schaken 87'	Stadium: De Bongerd; Attendance: 3,000; Referee: Kees van Duijn

20 July 2010	FC Dordrecht (Netherlands)	0–4	(Netherlands) Feyenoord	Dordrecht, Netherlands
20:00		Report	Bahia 31', 53'; Mokotjo 64'; Vlaar 75'	Stadium: GN Bouw Stadion; Attendance: 3,500; Referee: Danny Makkelie

25 July 2010	Feyenoord (Netherlands)	0–1	(Spain) RCD Mallorca	Rotterdam, Netherlands
14:30		Report	De Vrij 34' (o.g.)	Stadium: De Kuip; Attendance: 35,000; Referee: Ed Janssen

==== Guadiana Trophy ====
As part of the pre-season preparations, Feyenoord participated in the Guadiana Trophy. All matches were played at the Complexo Desportivo de Vila Real de Santo António in Vila Real de Santo António, Portugal. As there were only three teams in this year's edition of the Guadiana Trophy, a penalty shootout was carried out at the end of each fixture to make sure that a clear winner could be selected. Feyenoord lost both matches against Aston Villa and Benfica and finished on the last third place in the tournament.

30 July 2010	Benfica (Portugal)	4–1 (5–4 p)	(Netherlands) Feyenoord	Vila Real de Santo António, Portugal
21:15	Cardozo 50', 72'; Menezes 75'; Amorim 85'	Report	Smolov 3'	Stadium: Complexo Desportivo de Vila Real de Santo António; Attendance: 8,000; Referee: Duarte Gomes
	Penalties
	Cardozo (penalty scored); Menezes (penalty scored); Amorim (penalty scored); Luiz (penalty scored); Coentrão (penalty scored)		Vlaar (penalty missed); Fernández (penalty scored); De Cler (penalty scored); Wijnaldum (penalty scored); Fer (penalty scored)

31 July 2010	Feyenoord (Netherlands)	1–3 (4–4 p)	(England) Aston Villa	Vila Real de Santo António, Portugal
21:15	Castaignos 14'	Report	Albrighton 4'; Heskey 73'; Sidwell 79'	Stadium: Complexo Desportivo de Vila Real de Santo António; Attendance: 8,000; Referee: Bruno Paixão
	Penalties
	Martins Indi (penalty scored); Smolov (penalty scored); Van Haaren (penalty missed); Cabral (penalty scored); De Vrij (penalty scored)		Carew (penalty scored); Bannan (penalty scored); Sidwell (penalty scored); Shorey (penalty scored); Lichaj (penalty missed)

== Players ==
=== First team squad ===
Feyenoord's first team squad for the season 2010–11 consists of three goalkeepers and 23 field players. In total, eleven academy graduates are part of the first team squad.

Feyenoord's first eleven.

Note: Flags indicate national team as defined under FIFA eligibility rules; some limited exceptions apply. Players may hold more than one non-FIFA nationality.

No.	Pos.	Nation	Player
2	DF	NED	Stefan de Vrij
3	DF	BEL	Gill Swerts (on loan from AZ Alkmaar)
4	DF	BRA	André Bahia
5	DF	NED	Tim de Cler
6	MF	NED	Marcel Meeuwis (on loan from Gladbach)
7	FW	NED	Ruben Schaken
8	MF	NED	Leroy Fer
9	DF	IDN	Jhon van Beukering
10	MF	NED	Luigi Bruins
11	FW	DEN	Jon Dahl Tomasson
14	MF	NED	Adil Auassar
15	MF	RSA	Kamohelo Mokotjo
16	GK	BRA	Darley
17	GK	NED	Erwin Mulder
18	GK	NED	Rob van Dijk

No.	Pos.	Nation	Player
19	DF	HUN	Krisztián Simon (on loan from Újpest)
20	DF	NED	Ron Vlaar (captain)
21	DF	ESP	Dani Fernández
22	FW	NED	Diego Biseswar
23	FW	CIV	Sekou Cissé
24	FW	DEN	Søren Larsen (on loan from Toulouse FC)
25	MF	NED	Georginio Wijnaldum
26	MF	NED	Ricky van Haaren
27	MF	NED	Kelvin Leerdam
28	DF	NED	Bart Schenkeveld
30	FW	NED	Luc Castaignos
31	FW	NED	Jerson Cabral
32	DF	NED	Bruno Martins Indi
33	GK	GRE	Kostas Lamprou
34	FW	JPN	Ryo Miyaichi (on loan from Arsenal FC)

== Transfers ==
=== Summer transfer window ===
In: Note: Flags indicate national team as defined under FIFA eligibility rules; some limited exceptions apply. Players may hold more than one non-FIFA nationality.

No.	Pos.	Nation	Player
7	MF	NED	Ruben Schaken (from VVV-Venlo)
14	MF	NED	Adil Auassar (from VVV-Venlo)
15	MF	RSA	Kamohelo Mokotjo (loan return from Excelsior)
19	DF	DEN	Michael Lumb (on loan from (Russia) Zenit St. Petersburg)
24	FW	RUS	Fyodor Smolov (on loan from (Russia) Dynamo Moscow)

Out: Note: Flags indicate national team as defined under FIFA eligibility rules; some limited exceptions apply. Players may hold more than one non-FIFA nationality.

No.	Pos.	Nation	Player
3	DF	NED	Kevin Hofland (on loan to (Cyprus) AEK Larnaca)
7	MF	NED	Denny Landzaat (to FC Twente)
8	DF	NED	Giovanni van Bronckhorst (retired)
9	FW	NED	Roy Makaay (retired)
15	MF	SRB	Stefan Babović (loan return to (France) FC Nantes)
24	FW	NED	Mitchell Schet (to RKC Waalwijk)
29	FW	RSA	Kermit Erasmus (to (South Africa) SuperSport United, was on loan to Excelsior)
33	MF	NED	Jonathan de Guzmán (to (Spain) Real Mallorca)

=== Winter transfer window ===
In: Note: Flags indicate national team as defined under FIFA eligibility rules; some limited exceptions apply. Players may hold more than one non-FIFA nationality.

No.	Pos.	Nation	Player
3	DF	BEL	Gill Swerts (on loan from AZ Alkmaar)
6	MF	NED	Marcel Meeuwis (on loan from (Germany) Borussia Mönchengladbach)
9	FW	IDN	Jhon van Beukering (free agent)
19	MF	HUN	Krisztián Simon (on loan from (Hungary) Újpest)
24	FW	DEN	Søren Larsen (on loan from (France) Toulouse FC)
33	GK	GRE	Kostas Lamprou (loan return from Excelsior)
34	FW	JPN	Ryo Miyaichi (on loan from (England) Arsenal FC)

Out: Note: Flags indicate national team as defined under FIFA eligibility rules; some limited exceptions apply. Players may hold more than one non-FIFA nationality.

No.	Pos.	Nation	Player
6	MF	MAR	Karim El Ahmadi (on loan to (United Arab Emirates) Al Ahli)
19	DF	DEN	Michael Lumb (on loan to (Denmark) Aalborg, was on loan from (Russia) Zenit St. Petersburg)
24	FW	RUS	Fyodor Smolov (loan return to (Russia) Dynamo Moscow)

=== Out on loan ===
Note: Flags indicate national team as defined under FIFA eligibility rules; some limited exceptions apply. Players may hold more than one non-FIFA nationality.

No.	Pos.	Nation	Player
3	DF	NED	Kevin Hofland (on loan to AEK Larnaca)
6	MF	MAR	Karim El Ahmadi (on loan to Al-Ahli Dubai)
