= 2009–10 Feyenoord season =

Feyenoord
2009–10 season
- Chairman: Dick van Well
- Manager: Mario Been
- Stadium: De Kuip
- Eredivisie: 4th
- KNVB Cup: Runner-up
- Top goalscorer: League: Jon Dahl Tomasson (11 goals); All: Jon Dahl Tomasson (16 goals)
- Highest home attendance: 47,000 vs Ajax (Eredivisie)
- Lowest home attendance: 10,000 vs Den Bosch (KNVB Cup Third Round)
Home colours	Away colours

The 2009–10 season was the first season under new coach Mario Been. The former Feyenoord striker was manager of NEC, and has been assistant-coach of Bert van Marwijk at Feyenoord in the past. Feyenoord welcomed five new players: Dani Fernández joined on a free transfer from NEC; Sekou Cissé signed a four-year deal after his transfer from Roda JC, Kamohelo Mokotjo came over from SuperSport United; and loan agreements were made with Borac Čačak for Aleksandar Ignjatović and with Nantes for Stefan Babović.

== Pre-season ==
Feyenoord began the pre-season with a 5–0 win against the amateurs of SC Feyenoord. Feyenoord then played the amateurs of BVV Wit-Rood-Wit (1–10 win), BVV Barendrecht (0–2 win) and BSV Limburgia (0–12 win). The first serious test came against VVV-Venlo on July 11 for the Herman Teeuwen Bokaal. The game ended in a 2–2 draw, but VVV-Venlo proved the better at the penalty-shoot-out and claimed the trophy. Feyenoord won a friendly against Sporting CP in Lisbon with 1–2, before ending their pre-season preparations with a 3–0 home win against Italian side Sampdoria.

== Competitions ==
=== Overall ===
Competition	Started round	Final position / round	First match	Last match
Eredivisie	—	Fourth	2 August 2009	2 May 2010
KNVB Cup	2nd round	Runner-up	24 September 2009	6 May 2010

Source: Competitions

=== Eredivisie ===
==== League table ====
Pos	Team	Pld	W	D	L	GF	GA	GD	Pts	Qualification or relegation
2	Ajax	34	27	4	3	106	20	+86	85	Qualification to Champions League third qualifying round
3	PSV	34	23	9	2	72	29	+43	78	Qualification to Europa League play-off round
4	Feyenoord	34	17	12	5	54	31	+23	63	Qualification to Europa League play-off round
5	AZ	34	19	5	10	64	34	+30	62	Qualification to Europa League third qualifying round
6	Heracles	34	17	5	12	54	49	+5	56	Qualification to European competition play-offs

Source: eredivsie.nl (in Dutch)
Rules for classification: 1) points; 2) goal difference; 3) number of goals scored.

==== Results summary ====
Overall								Home						Away					
Pld	W	D	L	GF	GA	GD	Pts	W	D	L	GF	GA	GD	W	D	L	GF	GA	GD
34	17	12	5	54	31	+23	63	9	6	2	32	14	+18	8	6	3	22	17	+5

Source: Matches

==== Matches ====
2 August 2009 1	Feyenoord	2–0	NEC	Rotterdam
	Tomasson 10'; Fer 77' (pen.)	Report		Stadium: Stadion Feijenoord; Attendance: 44,000; Referee: Pieter Vink

9 August 2009 2	Vitesse	0–0	Feyenoord	Arnhem
		Report		Stadium: GelreDome; Attendance: 16,485; Referee: Björn Kuipers

16 August 2009 3	Heracles	0–1	Feyenoord	Almelo
		Report	Tomasson 10'	Stadium: Polman Stadion; Attendance: 8,500; Referee: Ruud Bossen

23 August 2009 4	Feyenoord	4–0	Roda JC	Rotterdam
	Cissé 4'; Tomasson 33'; De Guzmán 39', 86'	Report		Stadium: Stadion Feijenoord; Attendance: 44,000; Referee: van Sichem

30 August 2009 5	Feyenoord	1–1	Twente	Rotterdam
	Makaay 90+4' (pen.)	Report	Kuiper 74'	Stadium: Stadion Feijenoord; Attendance: 45,000; Referee: Luinge

13 September 2009 6	Willem II	2–3	Feyenoord	Tilburg
	Boutahar 2'; Biemans 33'	Report	Tomasson 9', 18'; De Guzmán 69'	Stadium: Willem II Stadion; Attendance: 13,000; Referee: Serge Gumienny

20 September 2009 7	Feyenoord	1–3	PSV	Rotterdam
	Slory 23'	Report	11', 20' Koevermans; 37' Bakkal	Stadium: De Kuip; Attendance: 45,000; Referee: Eric Braamhaar

27 September 2009 8	NAC Breda	0–2	Feyenoord	Breda
		Report	64' Slory; 90+3' Fer; (yellow card) 52' (yellow-red card) 89' Landzaat	Stadium: Rat Verlegh Stadion; Attendance: 17,750; Referee: Pieter Vink

3 October 2009 9	Feyenoord	3–0	RKC Waalwijk	Rotterdam
	Slory 28'; Varela 73' (o.g.); Wijnaldum 90'	Report		Stadium: De Kuip; Attendance: 45,000; Referee: Kevin Blom

18 October 2009 10	Sparta Rotterdam	2–1	Feyenoord	Rotterdam
	Poepon 57', (yellow card) 37' (yellow-red card) 69'; Strootman 84'	Report	37' Bahia; (red card) 51' Cissé; (red card) 59' Tomasson	Stadium: Het Kasteel; Attendance: 10,894; Referee: Bas Nijhuis

24 October 2009 11	Feyenoord	1–0	VVV-Venlo	Rotterdam
	Landzaat 27'	Report		Stadium: De Kuip; Attendance: 44,000; Referee: Roelof Luinge

1 November 2009 12	Ajax	5–1	Feyenoord	Amsterdam
	De Zeeuw 42', 82'; Emanuelson 47'; Van der Wiel 58'; Suárez 90+1' (pen.)	Report	(red card) 43' Babović; 43' Landzaat; (red card) 89' Van Dijk	Stadium: Amsterdam Arena; Attendance: 51,000; Referee: Kevin Blom

8 November 2009 13	AZ	1–1	Feyenoord	Alkmaar
	Holmann 55'	Report	5' Cissé	Stadium: Stadion Alkmaar; Attendance: 16,700; Referee: Björn Kuipers

22 November 2009 14	Feyenoord	0–0	Utrecht	Rotterdam
		Report		Stadium: De Kuip; Attendance: 44,500; Referee: Pieter Vink

29 November 2009 15	ADO Den Haag	0–2	Feyenoord	The Hague
		Report	23' Vlaar; 90+4' Slory	Stadium: ADO Den Haag Stadion; Attendance: 13,800; Referee: Bas Nijhuis

6 December 2009 16	Feyenoord	3–1	Groningen	Rotterdam
	Babović 53'; Makaay 57'; Tomasson 83'	Report	4' Van der Laak	Stadium: De Kuip; Attendance: 42,500; Referee: Eric Braamhaar

12 December 2009 17	Heerenveen	0–2	Feyenoord	Heerenveen
		Report	68' Hofland; 82' Tomasson	Stadium: Abe Lenstra Stadion; Attendance: 26,100; Referee: Ruud Bossen

19 December 2009 18	Feyenoord	1–0	Willem II	Rotterdam
	Cissé 12'	Report		Stadium: De Kuip; Attendance: 42,000; Referee: Dick van Egmond

24 January 2010 19	VVV-Venlo	1–1	Feyenoord	Venlo
	De Regt 85'	Report	65' (o.g.) Paauwe	Stadium: Stadion de Koel; Attendance: 7,500; Referee: Luc Wouters

31 January 2010 20	Feyenoord	1–1	Ajax	Rotterdam
	Wijnaldum 67'	Report	25' Pantelić	Stadium: Stadion Feijenoord; Attendance: 47,000; Referee: Pieter Vink

4 February 2010 21	RKC Waalwijk	0–1	Feyenoord	Waalwijk
		Report	48' Tomasson; (red card) 84' Landzaat	Stadium: Mandemakers Stadion; Attendance: 7,000; Referee: Pol van Boekel

7 February 2010 22	Feyenoord	1–2	AZ	Rotterdam
	Wernbloom 38' (o.g.)	Report	28' El Hamdaoui; 87' Moreno	Stadium: De Kuip; Attendance: 45,000; Referee: Eric Braamhaar

14 February 2010 23	Utrecht	0–0	Feyenoord	Utrecht
		Report		Stadium: Stadion Galgenwaard; Attendance: 23,000; Referee: Tom van Sichem

21 February 2010 24	Feyenoord	2–2	ADO Den Haag	Rotterdam
	Wijnaldum 23'; Tomasson 76'	Report	10' (o.g.) Van Bronckhorst; 90+3' Buijs	Stadium: De Kuip; Attendance: 42,000; Referee: Bossen

28 February 2010 25	Groningen	2–3	Feyenoord	Groningen
	Matavž 83'; Granqvist 88'	Report	57' Bahia; 80' Bisewar; 90+2' Vlaar	Stadium: Euroborg; Attendance: 21,959; Referee: Kevin Blom

7 March 2010 26	Roda JC	2–4	Feyenoord	Kerkrade
	Vormer (red card) 20'; Yulu Matondo 62'; Bodor 85'	Report	14', 60' Cissé; 71' Bruins; 82' Makaay; (red card) 84' Darley	Stadium: Parkstad Limburg Stadion; Attendance: 17,300; Referee: Roelof Luinge

14 March 2010 27	Feyenoord	1–1	Heracles	Rotterdam
	Vlaar 90+3'	Report	82' Everton	Stadium: De Kuip; Attendance: 46,500; Referee: Dick van Egmond

20 March 2010 28	Feyenoord	2–1	Vitesse	Rotterdam
	Vlaar 13'; Makaay 55'	Report	45' Pluim	Stadium: De Kuip; Attendance: 45,000; Referee: Serge Gumienny

28 March 2010 29	NEC	0–0	Feyenoord	Nijmegen
		Report		Stadium: McDOS Goffertstadion; Attendance: 12,500; Referee: Bas Nijhuis

4 April 2010 30	Feyenoord	0–0	NAC Breda	Rotterdam
		Report		Stadium: De Kuip; Attendance: 38,000; Referee: Vink

10 April 2010 31	PSV	0–0	Feyenoord	Eindhoven
		Report		Stadium: Philips Stadion; Attendance: 34,400; Referee: Kevin Blom

14 April 2010 32	Feyenoord	3–0	Sparta Rotterdam	Rotterdam
	Wijnaldum 27'; Bruins 46'; Tomasson 75'	Report		Stadium: De Kuip; Attendance: 46,500; Referee: Björn Kuipers

18 April 2010 33	Twente	2–0	Feyenoord	Enschede
	Nkufo 40'; Stoch 68'	Report		Stadium: De Grolsch Veste; Attendance: 24,000; Referee: Jack van Hulten

2 May 2010 34	Feyenoord	6–2	Heerenveen	Rotterdam
	Makaay 13', 58', 75'; De Vrij 32'; Tomasson 51'; Bahia 86'	Report	12' Grindheim; 23' Elm	Stadium: De Kuip; Attendance: 43,000; Referee: Danny Makkelie

=== KNVB Cup ===
24 September 2009 Second round	Harkemase Boys	0–5	Feyenoord	Harkema
		Report	27' Biseswar; 29' Fer; 32' Vlaar; 56', 67' Makaay	Stadium: Sportpark de Bosk; Attendance: 5,500; Referee: Pol van Boekel

27 October 2009 Third round	Feyenoord	2–0	Den Bosch	Rotterdam
	Bahia 25'; Babović 90'	Report		Stadium: Stadion Feijenoord; Attendance: 10,000; Referee: Makkelie

22 December 2009 Fourth Round	Feyenoord	1–0	AZ	Rotterdam
	Wijnaldum 41'	Report		Stadium: De Kuip; Attendance: 40,000; Referee: Jack van Hulten

27 January 2010 Quarter-finals	PSV	0–3	Feyenoord	Eindhoven
		Report	20', 87' El Ahmadi; 34' Van Bronckhorst	Stadium: Philips Stadion; Attendance: 22,000; Referee: Kevin Blom

24 March 2010 Semi-finals	Feyenoord	2–1	Twente	Rotterdam
	Van Bronckhorst 53'; Makaay 84'	Report	42' Ruiz	Stadium: De Kuip; Attendance: 45,000; Referee: Ruud Bossen

25 April 2010 Final, first leg	Ajax	2–0	Feyenoord	Amsterdam
	De Jong 6', 7'	Report		Stadium: Amsterdam Arena; Attendance: 37,283; Referee: Eric Braamhaar

6 May 2010 Final, return	Feyenoord	1–4	Ajax	Rotterdam
	Tomasson 72'	Report	4', 82' Suárez; 64', 77' De Jong	Stadium: De Kuip; Attendance: 33,500; Referee: Roelof Luinge

=== Friendlies ===
27 June 2009	SC Feyenoord	0–5	Feyenoord	Rotterdam
		Report	45', 79' Bruins; 50' Pattinama; 53' (o.g.) Unknown; 85' De Cler	Stadium: Sportcomplex Varkenoord; Attendance: Unknown; Referee: Unknown

30 June 2009	BVV Wit Rood Wit	1–10	Feyenoord	Vierpolders
	Hassel 66'	Report	4' Makaay; 28' Bruins; 29' Slory; 30' Tomasson; 42' Fernández; 58' Hofs; 64', 69' (pen.) Landzaat; 71', 77' (pen.) Pattinama	Stadium: Sportpark Geuzenpark; Attendance: Unknown; Referee: Unknown

4 July 2009	BVV Barendrecht	0–2	Feyenoord	Barendrecht
		Report	23', 29' Tomasson	Stadium: Sportpark de Bongerd; Attendance: 5,000; Referee: Unknown

8 July 2009	BSV Limburgia	0–12	Feyenoord	Brunssum
		Report	11' Tomasson; 29' De Cler; 41' (pen.) Landzaat; 70' Wijnaldum; 73', 81', 89' Biseswar; 76', 85' Vlaar; 83' Pedro; 87' Leerdam; 90' Fer	Stadium: Sportpark Houserveld; Attendance: 2,000; Referee: Frank Franssen

11 July 2009	VVV-Venlo	2–2	Feyenoord	Venlo
	Honda 41', 83'		56' Fer; 58' Bruins	Stadium: Stadion de Koel; Attendance: 5,850; Referee: Richard Liesveld

18 July 2009	Sporting CP	1–2	Feyenoord	Lisbon
	Postiga 31'		46' De Guzmán; 49' Makaay	Stadium: Estádio José Alvalade; Attendance: 30,000; Referee: Hélder Malheiro

26 July 2009	Feyenoord	3–0	Sampdoria	Rotterdam
	Fer 19'; Bruins 40' (pen.); De Guzmán 88'	Report		Stadium: De Kuip; Attendance: 30,000; Referee: Reinold Wiedemeijer

6 January 2010	VV Hierden	0–7	Feyenoord	Hierden
			26' Babović; 38' Makaay; 50' Bruins; 56', 74', 80' Castaignos; 72' Biseswar	Stadium: Sportpark Mheenzicht; Attendance: 500; Referee: unknown

== Player details ==
No.	Pos	Nat	Player	Total		Eredivisie		KNVB Cup		Friendly	
No.	Pos	Nat	Player	Apps	Goals	Apps	Goals	Apps	Goals	Apps	Goals
17	GK	(Netherlands) NED	Erwin Mulder	14	0	10	0	3	0	1	0
18	GK	(Netherlands) NED	Rob van Dijk	30	0	23	0	4	0	3	0
16	GK	(Brazil) BRA	Darley	11	0	5	0	0	0	6	0
2	DF	(Serbia) SRB	Aleksandar Ignjatović	2	0	0	0	0	0	2	0
3	DF	(Netherlands) NED	Kevin Hofland	19	2	8	1	4	0	7	1
4	DF	(Brazil) BRA	André Bahia	45	4	32	3	6	1	7	0
5	DF	(Netherlands) NED	Tim de Cler	15	2	7	0	3	0	5	2
20	DF	(Netherlands) NED	Ron Vlaar	44	8	32	4	7	1	5	3
21	DF	(Spain) ESP	Dani Fernández	10	0	5	0	0	0	5	0
28	DF	(Netherlands) NED	Bart Schenkeveld	9	0	5	0	2	0	2	0
29	DF	(Netherlands) NED	Stefan de Vrij	23	1	17	1	5	0	1	0
31	DF	(Netherlands) NED	Bruno Martins Indi	1	0	0	0	0	0	1	0
34	DF	(Netherlands) NED	Kaj Ramsteijn	1	0	0	0	0	0	1	0
28	DF	(Netherlands) NED	Norichio Nieveld	2	0	0	0	0	0	2	0
	DF	(Netherlands) NED	Dwight Tiendalli	2	0	0	0	0	0	2	0
	DF	(Suriname) SUR	Sigourney Bandjar	2	0	0	0	0	0	2	0
8	MF	(Netherlands) NED	Giovanni van Bronckhorst	39	2	29	0	4	2	6	0
27	MF	(Netherlands) NED	Kelvin Leerdam	24	1	17	0	3	0	4	1
6	MF	(Morocco) MAR	Karim El Ahmadi	36	2	26	0	6	2	4	0
7	MF	(Netherlands) NED	Denny Landzaat	34	3	20	2	7	0	7	1
10	MF	(Netherlands) NED	Luigi Bruins	30	5	21	2	2	0	7	3
14	MF	(Netherlands) NED	Leroy Fer	45	6	31	2	7	1	7	3
15	MF	(Serbia) SRB	Stefan Babović	15	3	10	1	3	1	2	1
25	MF	(Netherlands) NED	Giorginio Wijnaldum	44	6	31	4	7	1	6	1
26	MF	(Netherlands) NED	Ricky van Haaren	2	0	1	0	0	0	1	0
33	MF	(Netherlands) NED	Jonathan de Guzmán	19	7	13	3	2	0	4	4
32	MF	(Netherlands) NED	Shabir Isoufi	1	0	0	0	0	0	1	0
9	FW	(Netherlands) NED	Roy Makaay	36	14	24	7	4	3	8	4
11	FW	(Denmark) DEN	Jon Dahl Tomasson	32	16	24	11	4	1	4	4
22	FW	(Netherlands) NED	Andwélé Slory	21	4	13	4	1	0	7	0
23	FW	(Ivory Coast) CIV	Sekou Cissé	30	5	24	5	1	0	5	0
24	FW	(Netherlands) NED	Mitchell Schet	3	0	2	0	0	0	1	0
26	FW	(Netherlands) NED	Jordao Pattinama	2	0	0	0	0	0	2	0
30	FW	(Netherlands) NED	Luc Castaignos	6	3	3	0	2	0	1	3
32	FW	(Netherlands) NED	Luís Pedro	2	1	0	0	0	0	2	1
37	FW	(Netherlands) NED	Diego Biseswar	41	5	29	1	5	1	7	3
	FW	(Netherlands) NED	Hanne Hagary	1	0	0	0	0	0	1	0
	FW	(Poland) POL	Michał Janota	2	0	0	0	0	0	2	0
29	FW	(Netherlands) NED	Tim Vincken	2	0	0	0	0	0	2	0
30	FW	(Netherlands) NED	Nicky Hofs	2	0	0	0	0	0	2	0

== Transfers ==
In: Note: Flags indicate national team as defined under FIFA eligibility rules; some limited exceptions apply. Players may hold more than one non-FIFA nationality.

No.	Pos.	Nation	Player
—	DF	ESP	Dani Fernández (from NEC)
—	FW	NED	Sekou Cissé (from Roda JC)
—	MF	RSA	Kamohelo Mokotjo (from SuperSport United)
—	DF	SRB	Aleksandar Ignjatović (on loan from (Serbia) Borac Čačak)
—	MF	SRB	Stefan Babović (on loan from (France) Nantes)

Out: Note: Flags indicate national team as defined under FIFA eligibility rules; some limited exceptions apply. Players may hold more than one non-FIFA nationality.

No.	Pos.	Nation	Player
—	MF	NED	Nick Hofs (free to Vitesse)
—	MF	NED	Danny Buijs (free to ADO Den Haag)
—	GK	EGY	Sherif Ekramy (free to El Gouna)
—	MF	KOR	Lee Chun-soo (sold to Al Nassr)
—	MF	NED	Glen Kobussen (free to Go Ahead Eagles)
—	MF	NED	Jeffrey Altheer (free to Helmond Sport)
—	DF	NED	Dwight Tiendalli (free to Twente)
—	DF	NED	Serginho Greene (free to Vitesse)
—	MF	NED	Theo Lucius (free to Den Bosch)
—	FW	NED	Michael Mols (retired)
—	GK	NED	Henk Timmer (free to Heerenveen)
—	DF	NED	Aleksandar Ignjatović (end of loan Borac Čačak*)
—	FW	NED	Andwélé Slory (free to West Bromwich Albion)
—	FW	RSA	Kermit Erasmus (loan to SBV Excelsior)
—	MF	NED	Kevin Wattamaleo (loan to SBV Excelsior)
—	DF	NED	Tobias Waisapy (loan to SBV Excelsior)
—	MF	CZE	Vojtech Machek (loan to SBV Excelsior)
—	DF	NED	Norichio Nieveld (loan to SBV Excelsior)
—	FW	NED	Jordao Pattinama (loan to SBV Excelsior)
—	MF	POL	Michał Janota (loan to SBV Excelsior)
—	MF	NED	Kamohelo Mokotjo (loan to SBV Excelsior)
—	FW	NED	Tim Vincken (loan to SBV Excelsior)
—	FW	BRA	Manteiga (loan to Ponte Preta)
—	FW	NED	Luís Pedro (loan to SBV Excelsior)

== Club ==
=== Coaching staff ===
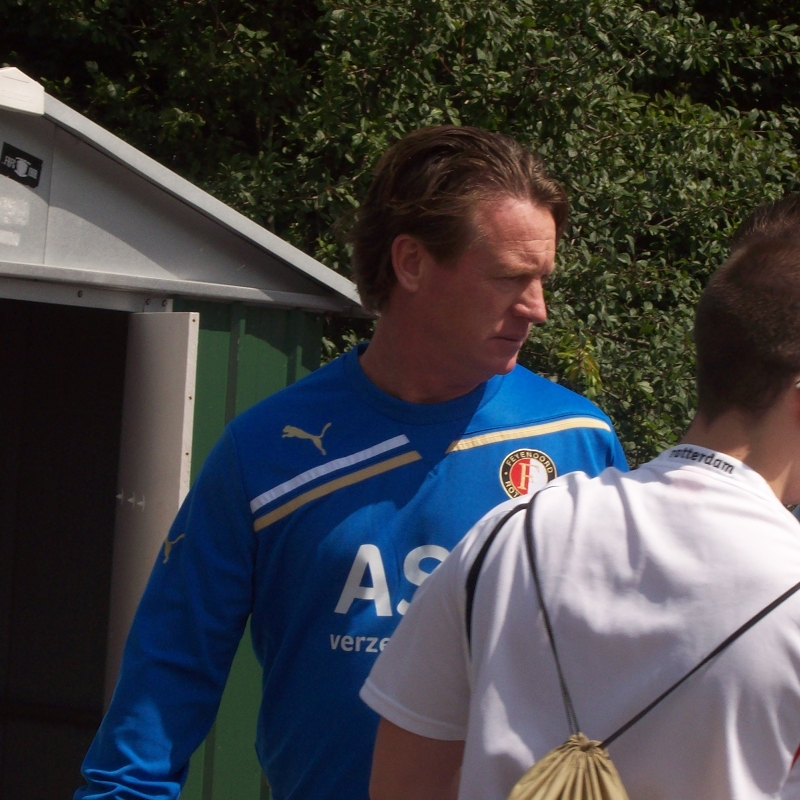
This was Mario Been's first season as manager of Feyenoord.

Position	Staff
Manager	(Netherlands) Mario Been
Assistant manager	(Netherlands) Leon Vlemmings
Assistant manager / Goalkeeping coach	(Netherlands) Patrick Lodewijks
Fitness coach	(Netherlands) Toine van de Goolberg

Last updated: 22 July 2012

=== Kit ===
Supplier: Puma
Sponsor(s): ASR Verzekeringen

Home	Away	Third	Goalkeeper (1)	Goalkeeper (2)

Last updated: 23 July 2013.
Source: Feyenoord
