= 2012–13 Feyenoord season =

Feyenoord
2012–13 season
- Chairman: Dick van Well
- Manager: Ronald Koeman
- Stadium: De Kuip
- Eredivisie: 3rd
- KNVB Cup: Quarter-finals
- Champions League: Third qualifying round
- Europa League: Play-off round
- Top goalscorer: League: Graziano Pellè (27); All: Graziano Pellè (29)
Home colours	Away colours

The 2012–13 season was Feyenoord's 105th season of play. It was their 57th season in the Eredivisie and its 91st consecutive season in the highest Dutch football division. The club ended its league campaign in third place, being undefeated at home, and reached the quarter-finals of the KNVB Cup. Their European campaign ended after four matches, two each in the UEFA Champions League and UEFA Europa League. It was the club's second season under manager Ronald Koeman.

== Competitions ==
=== Overall ===
Competition	Started round	Final position / round	First match	Last match
Eredivisie	—	Third	12 August 2012	12 May 2013
KNVB Cup	2nd round	Quarter-final	26 September 2012	30 January 2013
UEFA Champions League	Third qualifying round	Third qualifying round	31 July 2012	7 August 2012
UEFA Europa League	Play-off round	Play-off round	23 August 2013	30 August 2013

Source: Competitions

=== Eredivisie ===
==== League table ====
Pos	Team	Pld	W	D	L	GF	GA	GD	Pts	Qualification or relegation
1	Ajax (C)	34	22	10	2	83	31	+52	76	Qualification for the Champions League group stage
2	PSV	34	22	3	9	103	43	+60	69	Qualification for the Champions League third qualifying round
3	Feyenoord	34	21	6	7	64	38	+26	69	Qualification to Europa League play-off round
4	Vitesse Arnhem	34	19	7	8	68	42	+26	64	Qualification for the Europa League third qualifying round
5	Utrecht (O)	34	19	6	9	55	41	+14	63	Qualification to European competition play-offs

Source: Eredivisie
Rules for classification: 1) points; 2) goal difference; 3) number of goals scored.
(C) Champions; (O) Play-off winners

==== Results summary ====
Overall								Home						Away					
Pld	W	D	L	GF	GA	GD	Pts	W	D	L	GF	GA	GD	W	D	L	GF	GA	GD
34	21	6	7	64	38	+26	69	14	3	0	42	12	+30	7	3	7	22	26	−4

Source: Matches

==== Matches ====
12 August 2012	FC Utrecht	0 – 1	Feyenoord	Utrecht
		Report	39' Cissé	Stadium: Stadion Galgenwaard; Attendance: 18,048; Referee: Van Boekel

18 August 2012	Feyenoord	1 – 1	SC Heerenveen	Rotterdam
	Schaken 83'	Report	77' (pen.) Đuričić	Stadium: De Kuip; Attendance: 42,500; Referee: Kuipers

26 August 2012	Heracles Almelo	1 – 2	Feyenoord	Almelo
	Duarte 52'	Report	4' Janmaat; 43' Immers	Stadium: Polman Stadion; Attendance: 8,500; Referee: Vink

2 September 2012	Vitesse Arnhem	1 – 0	Feyenoord	Arnhem
	Bony 90+1'	Report		Stadium: GelreDome; Attendance: 18,043; Referee: Blom

15 September 2012	Feyenoord	2 – 0	PEC Zwolle	Rotterdam
	Broerse 46' (o.g.); Immers 73' (pen.)	Report		Stadium: De Kuip; Attendance: 46,000; Referee: Wiedemeijer

23 September 2012	PSV	3 – 0	Feyenoord	Eindhoven
	Toivonen 63'; Wijnaldum 73'; Narsingh 76'	Report		Stadium: Philips Stadion; Attendance: 34,600; Referee: Liesveld

29 September 2012	Feyenoord	5 – 1	NEC	Rotterdam
	Pellè 16', 44'; Immers 47' (pen.), 63', 85'	Report	49' Rieks	Stadium: De Kuip; Attendance: 42,000; Referee: Nijhuis

7 October 2012	FC Groningen	2 – 2	Feyenoord	Groningen
	Bacuna 14'; Van Dijk 45+3'	Report	9' Cissé; 90' Martins Indi	Stadium: Euroborg; Attendance: 22,174; Referee: Gözübüyük

21 October 2012	VVV-Venlo	2 – 3	Feyenoord	Venlo
	Türk 19'; Joppen 21'	Report	45+2' (pen.) Immers; 47' Verhoek; 64' Pellè	Stadium: De Koel; Attendance: 7,000; Referee: Kuipers

28 October 2012	Feyenoord	2 – 2	Ajax	Rotterdam
	Boëtius 23'; Pellè 90'	Report	12' Eriksen; 48' De Jong	Stadium: De Kuip; Attendance: 48,000; Referee: Nijhuis

4 November 2012	FC Twente	3 – 0	Feyenoord	Enschede
	Chadli 9'; Castaignos 17'; Tadić 78'	Report		Stadium: De Grolsch Veste; Attendance: 30,000; Referee: Vink

11 November 2012	Feyenoord	5 – 2	Roda JC	Rotterdam
	Pellè 1', 25'; Immers 35'; Clasie 54'; Janmaat 73'	Report	12' Malki; 40' Biemans	Stadium: De Kuip; Attendance: 44,500; Referee: Braamhaar

18 November 2012	Feyenoord	3 – 0	Willem II	Rotterdam
	Immers 33'; Pellè 53', 60'	Report		Stadium: De Kuip; Attendance: 45,000; Referee: Delferiere

25 November 2012	AZ	0 – 2	Feyenoord	Alkmaar
		Report	66' Vilhena; 88' Schaken	Stadium: AFAS Stadion; Attendance: 17,000; Referee: Blom

1 December 2012	Feyenoord	2 – 0	RKC Waalwijk	Rotterdam
	Pellè 45+1', 57'	Report		Stadium: De Kuip; Attendance: 44,000; Referee: Makkelie

9 December 2012	NAC Breda	2 – 2	Feyenoord	Breda
	Luijckx 23'; Gudelj 76'	Report	5' Pellè; 74' (pen.) Immers	Stadium: Rat Verlegh Stadion; Attendance: 18,400; Referee: Gözübüyük

16 December 2012	Feyenoord	3 – 2	ADO Den Haag	Rotterdam
	Pellè 15'; Immers 45+1' (pen.); Chery 86' (o.g.)	Report	16' Van Duinen; 57' (pen.) Holla	Stadium: De Kuip; Attendance: 42,000; Referee: Bossen

23 December 2012	Feyenoord	2 – 1	FC Groningen	Rotterdam
	Pellè 58', 87'	Report	77' Van Dijk	Stadium: De Kuip; Attendance: 45,000; Referee: Kuipers

20 January 2013	Ajax	3 – 0	Feyenoord	Amsterdam
	Fischer 7', 40'; Eriksen 62'	Report		Stadium: Amsterdam Arena; Attendance: 53,052; Referee: Van Boekel

27 January 2013	Feyenoord	0 – 0	FC Twente	Rotterdam
		Report		Stadium: De Kuip; Attendance: 47,500; Referee: Vink

3 February 2013	Willem II	1 – 3	Feyenoord	Tilburg
	Misidjan 38' (pen.)	Report	10' Pellè; 49', 58' Vilhena	Stadium: Koning Willem II Stadion; Attendance: 12,300; Referee: Liesveld

10 February 2013	Feyenoord	3 – 1	AZ	Rotterdam
	Boëtius 24'; Clasie 72'; Vilhena 90+3'	Report	63' Beerens	Stadium: De Kuip; Attendance: 45,000; Referee: Nijhuis

17 February 2013	PEC Zwolle	3 – 2	Feyenoord	Zwolle
	Pellè 2' (o.g.); Lachman 6'; Avdić 75'	Report	33', 34' Pellè	Stadium: IJsseldelta Stadion; Attendance: 11,324; Referee: Braamhaar

24 February 2013	Feyenoord	2 – 1	PSV	Rotterdam
	Schaken 47'; Pellè 68'	Report	34' Lens	Stadium: De Kuip; Attendance: 47,000; Referee: Kuipers

3 March 2013	NEC	0 – 3	Feyenoord	Nijmegen
		Report	11', 83' Boëtius; 42' Pellè	Stadium: Stadion de Goffert; Attendance: 12,500; Referee: Makkelie

10 March 2013	Roda JC	0 – 1	Feyenoord	Kerkrade
		Report	30' Pellè	Stadium: Parkstad Limburg Stadion; Attendance: 16,200; Referee: Vink

17 March 2013	Feyenoord	2 – 1	FC Utrecht	Rotterdam
	Pellè 32'; Janmaat 61'	Report	59' Van der Gun	Stadium: De Kuip; Attendance: 47,000; Referee: Liesveld

30 March 2013	SC Heerenveen	2 – 0	Feyenoord	Heerenveen
	Finnbogason 85'; El Ghanassy 89'	Report		Stadium: Abe Lenstra Stadion; Attendance: 26,100; Referee: Blom

5 April 2013	Feyenoord	1 – 0	VVV-Venlo	Rotterdam
	Pellè 71'	Report		Stadium: De Kuip; Attendance: 47,000; Referee: Makkelie

14 April 2013	RKC Waalwijk	1 – 1	Feyenoord	Waalwijk
	Duits 55'	Report	13' (pen.) Pellè	Stadium: Mandemakers Stadion; Attendance: 7,508; Referee: Gözübüyük

21 April 2013	Feyenoord	2 – 0	Vitesse Arnhem	Rotterdam
	Pellè 39' (pen.); Immers 50'	Report		Stadium: De Kuip; Attendance: 45,000; Referee: Nijhuis

28 April 2013	Feyenoord	6 – 0	Heracles Almelo	Rotterdam
	Goossens 19', 68'; Pellè 30', 45+2' (pen.); Immers 33'; Schaken 55'	Report		Stadium: De Kuip; Attendance: 47,000; Referee: Van Boekel

5 May 2013	ADO Den Haag	2 – 0	Feyenoord	The Hague
	Van Duinen 10'; Holla 37' (pen.)	Report		Stadium: Kyocera Stadion; Attendance: 11,231; Referee: Liesveld

12 May 2013	Feyenoord	1 – 0	NAC Breda	Rotterdam
	Pellè 59'	Report		Stadium: De Kuip; Attendance: 47,000; Referee: Janssen

=== KNVB Cup ===
26 September 2012 Second round	NEC	2 – 3 (a.e.t.)	Feyenoord	Nijmegen
	Kongolo 1' (o.g.); George 60'	Report	43' Kongolo; 59' Cissé; 120+1' Immers	Stadium: Stadion de Goffert; Attendance: 9,446; Referee: Van Boekel

1 November 2012 Third round	XerxesDZB	0 – 4	Feyenoord	Rotterdam
		Report	60' (o.g.) Bentem; 69' Kongolo; 72' Vormer; 85' (pen.) Immers	Stadium: Sparta Stadion Het Kasteel; Attendance: 8,500; Referee: Kamphuis

19 December 2012 Fourth round	SC Heerenveen	2 – 2 (a.e.t.) (6 – 7 p)	Feyenoord	Heerenveen
	Gouweleeuw 55'; Đuričić 90+1'	Report	28' Pellè; 66' Immers	Stadium: Abe Lenstra Stadion; Attendance: 18,800; Referee: Nijhuis
	Penalties
	Finnbogason (penalty missed); Đuričić (penalty scored); Lukáš Mareček (penalty missed); Van Anholt (penalty scored); Kums (penalty scored); De Ridder (penalty scored); Kruiswijk (penalty scored); Kum (penalty missed); Van La Parra (penalty scored); Otigba (penalty missed)		(penalty missed) Immers; (penalty scored) Verhoek; (penalty scored) Vilhena; (penalty scored) Vormer; (penalty missed) Boëtius; (penalty scored) Mathijsen; (penalty scored) Pellè; (penalty missed) Martins Indi; (penalty scored) De Vrij; (penalty scored) Janmaat

30 January 2013 Quarter-finals	PSV	2 – 1	Feyenoord	Eindhoven
	Mertens 20'; Van Bommel 78'	Report	29' Pellè	Stadium: Philips Stadion; Attendance: 15,000; Referee: Blom

=== Champions League ===
==== Third qualifying round ====
31 July 2012 First leg	Dynamo Kyiv (Ukraine)	2 – 1	(Netherlands) Feyenoord	Kyiv
19:00	Immers 56' (o.g.); Ideye 69'	Report	Schaken 49'	Stadium: Olympic Stadium; Attendance: 53,612; Referee: Andre Marriner (England)

7 August 2012 Second leg	Feyenoord (Netherlands)	0 – 1 (1 – 3 agg.)	(Ukraine) Dynamo Kyiv	Rotterdam
20:00		Report	Ideye 90+6'	Stadium: De Kuip; Attendance: 45,000; Referee: Antony Gautier (France)

=== Europa League ===
==== Third qualifying round ====
23 August 2012 First leg	Feyenoord (Netherlands)	2 – 2	(Czech Republic) Sparta Prague	Rotterdam
20:00	Nelom 60'; Achahbar 90+3'	Report	V. Kadlec 23', 27'	Stadium: De Kuip; Attendance: 34,000; Referee: Peter Rasmussen (Denmark)

30 August 2012 Second leg	Sparta Prague (Czech Republic)	2 – 0 (4 – 2 agg.)	(Netherlands) Feyenoord	Prague
19:30	Kadlec 61' (pen.); Jarošík 70'	Report		Stadium: Generali Arena; Attendance: 17,036; Referee: Ivan Bebek (Croatia)

== Player details ==
No.	Pos	Nat	Player	Total		Eredivisie		KNVB Cup		Europa League		Friendly	
No.	Pos	Nat	Player	Apps	Goals	Apps	Goals	Apps	Goals	Apps	Goals	Apps	Goals
1	GK	(Netherlands) NED	Erwin Mulder	34	0	22	0	2	0	4	0	6	0
2	DF	(Netherlands) NED	Daryl Janmaat	47	3	33	3	2	0	4	0	8	0
3	DF	(Netherlands) NED	Stefan de Vrij	39	0	26	0	3	0	3	0	7	0
4	DF	(Netherlands) NED	Joris Mathijsen	36	0	29	0	3	0	2	0	2	0
4	DF	(Netherlands) NED	Ron Vlaar	2	0	0	0	0	0	0	0	2	0
5	DF	(Netherlands) NED	Bruno Martins Indi	46	1	32	1	3	0	4	0	7	0
6	MF	(Netherlands) NED	Jordy Clasie	46	2	33	2	2	0	4	0	7	0
7	MF	(Netherlands) NED	Kelvin Leerdam	23	0	11	0	1	0	4	0	7	0
8	MF	(Netherlands) NED	Ruud Vormer	27	1	12	0	4	1	4	0	7	0
9	FW	(Netherlands) NED	Guyon Fernandez	20	3	9	0	1	0	3	0	7	3
10	MF	(Netherlands) NED	Lex Immers	43	16	30	12	3	3	4	0	6	1
11	FW	(Netherlands) NED	Jerson Cabral	8	0	1	0	0	0	1	0	6	0
11	FW	(Netherlands) NED	Wesley Verhoek	28	1	25	1	3	0	0	0	0	0
13	GK	(Netherlands) NED	Ronald Graafland	3	0	0	0	0	0	0	0	3	0
14	FW	(Netherlands) NED	Kaj Ramsteijn	3	0	0	0	0	0	0	0	3	0
15	MF	(South Africa) RSA	Kamohelo Mokotjo	4	0	1	0	0	0	0	0	3	0
16	MF	(Norway) NOR	Harmeet Singh	19	0	8	0	2	0	2	0	7	0
17	MF	(Norway) NOR	Omar Elabdellaoui	9	0	5	0	1	0	1	0	2	0
18	DF	(Netherlands) NED	Miquel Nelom	32	1	20	0	2	0	4	1	6	0
19	FW	(Italy) ITA	Graziano Pellè	35	29	29	27	4	2	0	0	2	0
20	MF	(Netherlands) NED	John Goossens	12	2	10	2	1	0	0	0	1	0
21	MF	(Netherlands) NED	Tonny Vilhena	39	5	27	4	4	0	1	0	7	1
22	FW	(Netherlands) NED	Mitchell te Vrede	7	1	1	0	0	0	0	0	6	1
23	FW	(Ivory Coast) CIV	Sekou Cissé	19	6	10	2	2	1	3	0	4	3
24	DF	(Netherlands) NED	Bart Schenkeveld	2	0	0	0	0	0	0	0	2	0
24	DF	(Netherlands) NED	Lucas Woudenberg	1	0	0	0	0	0	0	0	1	0
25	DF	(Netherlands) NED	Terence Kongolo	13	3	5	0	2	2	1	0	5	1
26	DF	(Netherlands) NED	Matthew Steenvoorden	4	1	0	0	0	0	0	0	4	1
27	FW	(Netherlands) NED	Ruben Schaken	43	7	31	4	3	0	4	1	5	2
28	FW	(Netherlands) NED	Jean-Paul Boëtius	24	5	20	4	2	0	0	0	2	1
28	FW	(Netherlands) NED	Elvis Manu	4	4	0	0	0	0	0	0	4	4
29	FW	(Netherlands) NED	Anass Achahbar	19	3	7	0	3	0	2	1	7	2
31	GK	(Netherlands) NED	Michel Franken	0	0	0	0	0	0	0	0	0	0
32	DF	(Netherlands) NED	Sven van Beek	4	0	0	0	2	0	0	0	2	0
33	GK	(Greece) GRE	Kostas Lamprou	18	0	12	0	2	0	0	0	4	0
