= Erwin Mulder =

Dutch footballer (born 1989)

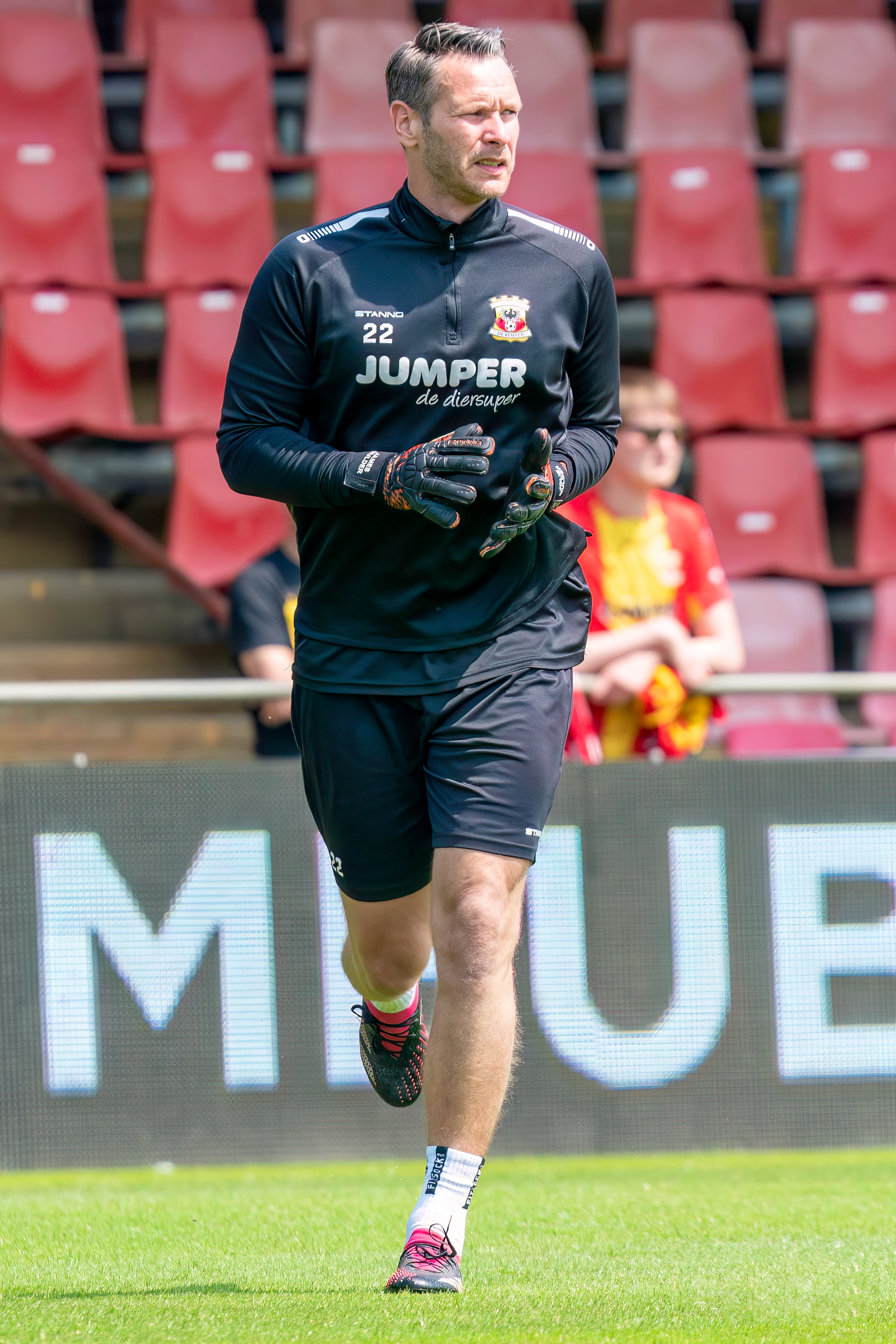
- Mulder in 2023

Personal information
- Full name: Erwin Gerardus Theodorus Franc Mulder
- Date of birth: 3 March 1989 (age 37)
- Place of birth: Pannerden, Netherlands
- Height: 1.93 m (6 ft 4 in)
- Position: Goalkeeper

Youth career
- R.K.P.S.C.
- Vitesse
- Feyenoord

Senior career*
Years	Team	Apps	(Gls)
2007–2015	Feyenoord	120	(0)
2008–2009	→ Excelsior (loan)	36	(0)
2015–2017	SC Heerenveen	68	(0)
2017–2020	Swansea City	29	(0)
2020–2022	SC Heerenveen	53	(0)
2022–2024	Go Ahead Eagles	0	(0)
Total		306	(0)

International career
2007–2008	Netherlands U19	1	(0)
2008–2009	Netherlands U20	3	(0)
2008–2009	Netherlands B	1	(0)
- * Club domestic league appearances and goals

Erwin Gerardus Theodorus Franc Mulder (born 3 March 1989) is a Dutch former professional footballer who played as a goalkeeper.

A Feyenoord academy graduate, he made more than 100 first-team appearances for the club between 2007 and 2015 and established himself as first choice in the early 2010s under Ronald Koeman. After a loan at Excelsior, he later played in the Eredivisie for Heerenveen and Go Ahead Eagles, and spent five seasons in England with Swansea City.

A youth international for the Netherlands at under-17, under-19, under-20 and under-21 level, he received a senior call-up in 2012. After retiring in 2024 he moved into coaching with Vitesse, becoming the club's first-team team manager in 2025.

== Early life ==
Mulder was born and raised in Pannerden, Gelderland, the Netherlands, a small village close to the German border halfway between Arnhem and Emmerich where footballer Robin Gosens was born. Mulder's father was a talented goalkeeper, making his first team debut at the age of 16 in the second highest amateur level. Mulder has two older brothers.

== Club career ==
=== Youth career ===
Mulder started playing football at local Pannerden club R.K.P.S.C. At the age of ten, he made the switch from field player to goalkeeper. After being a goalkeeper for one year, Mulder received his first invitation for the KNVB district team: "From that moment on I realized I had talent. I really enjoyed it as well, diving in the mud, loved it."

When Mulder went to secondary school around the age of 12, the goalkeeper joined the Vitesse Arnhem youth academy, a professional Eredivisie club from Arnhem. After playing for Vitesse for three seasons, he was asked to join the Feyenoord youth academy. At Feyenoord, Mulder was seen as one of the biggest goalkeeping talents. Feyenoord's former goalkeeping coach Pim Doesburg predicted him to be the first goalkeeper to reach Feyenoord's first team coming directly from the Feyenoord youth academy since Joop Hiele in the late seventies.

=== Feyenoord (2006–2015) ===
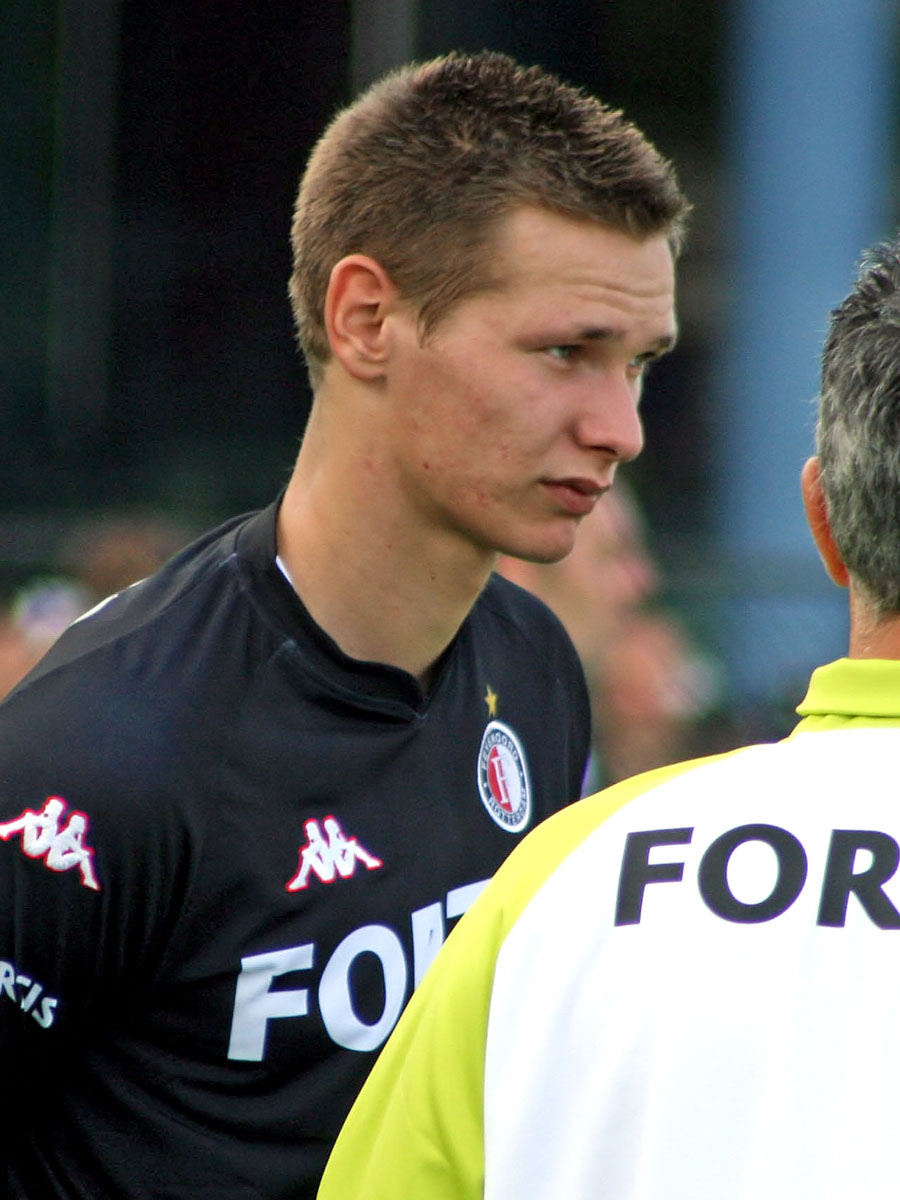
Mulder listening to the coach in training at Feyenoord.

==== Small steps (2006–2008) ====
In November 2006, at the age of 17, Mulder was invited to Feyenoord's first team squad by Feyenoord coach Erwin Koeman. As the reserve goalkeepers Patrick Lodewijks and Sherif Ekramy were both facing injuries, the teenager was Henk Timmer's first stand-in. He was on the bench for over ten matches during the season 2006–07, but did not make his official first team debut. In January 2007, Mulder was one of the few talents to join the first team on training camp in Belek, Turkey, but returned to the Feyenoord U19 squad afterwards.

On 5 May 2007, Feyenoord said he was expected to be among six players to be included in the first team the following month on 3 June 2007, the club announced that Mulder had been officially promoted to Feyenoord's first team squad for the 2007–08 season and extended his contract until summer 2011 on 28 September 2007. As Lodewijks retired, Mulder became third goalkeeper behind Timmer and Ekramy. Due to injuries of the first two goalkeepers, he made his official Eredivisie debut on 2 December 2007, in a home match against Heracles, which saw them win 6–0, and giving him his first clean sheet in his professional career. This turned out to be his first appearance in the 2007–08 season.

==== Loan spell (2008–2009) ====
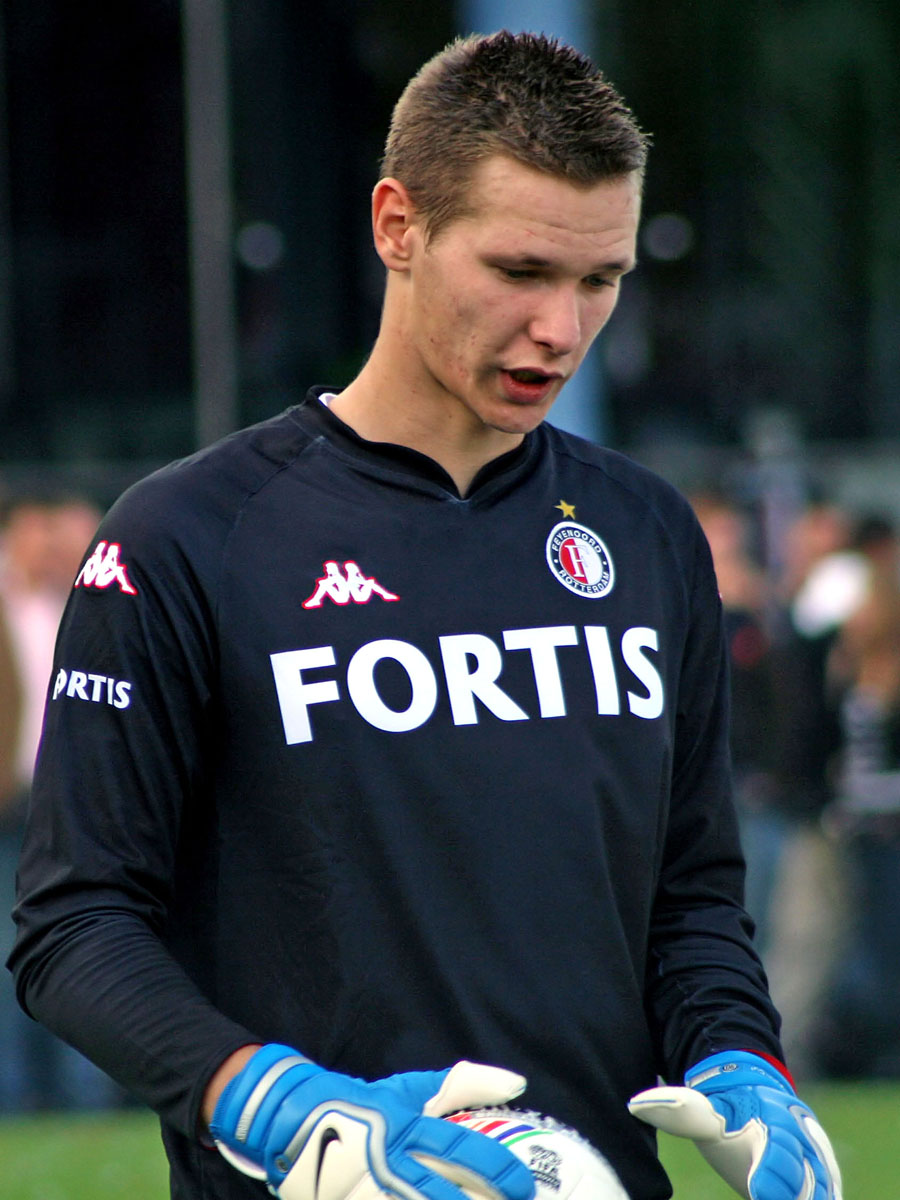
Mulder preparing to drop the ball in training at Feyenoord.

To gain experience, Mulder joined Excelsior on loan for the season 2008–09 under manager Ton Lokhoff. Excelsior had just been relegated to the Eerste Divisie and were in need of a first team goalkeeper after Ronald Graafland left the club to join Vitesse Arnhem.

On 8 August 2008, Mulder made his debut for Excelsior in a 1–0 loss against Telstar. Since making his debut for the club, he had established himself as the first choice goalkeeper at Excelsior. On 6 March 2009, Mulder received a straight red card, just a few minutes before half-time, for a professional foul in the penalty box, resulting in a penalty to FC Oss. After being sent off, Arjan van Dijk replaced him in goal. van Dijk could not save the penalty. The match finished with FC Oss beating Excelsior 3–1, in a game that saw three penalties awarded, (two for the home side and one to Excelsior). After a two-match ban because of his sending off, Mulder made his return in goal on 27 March 2009 against SC Cambuur in a 1–1 draw. At Excelsior, he played 36 matches for the third club from Rotterdam, finishing in fifth place in the Eerste Divisie.

His performance was strong at Excelsior that he was the only player in the Eerste Divisie selected by Johan Neeskens for the Netherlands B squad.

==== Return to Feyenoord (2009–2010) ====
When Feyenoord decided not to renew first team goalkeeper Henk Timmer's contract, Mulder returned to Feyenoord for the 2009–10 season, having previously stated that he was ready for the first team. During pre-season, he had to battle with reserve goalkeeper Rob van Dijk and Feyenoord U19's Darley Ramon Torres for a regular place under the bar.

Mulder was close to another season-long loan spell at Excelsior when Feyenoord decided to test the Slovak goalkeeper Kamil Čontofalský. He trained with the Excelsior squad for a week, but returned to Feyenoord when Čontofalský's trial had ended. However, Mulder pulled a muscle during a training session, causing him to be sidelined for up to four to six weeks.

After his recovery, he remained at Feyenoord after rumours of re-joining Excelsior on loan for the second time this season. However, Mulder spent most of the 2009–10 season as third choice goalkeeper behind Rob van Dijk and Derley. Nevertheless, he became first choice goalkeeper for the rest of the season after Derley was sent-off in a 4–2 win against Roda JC on 7 March 2010 and van Dijk's injury in a 1–1 draw against Heracles on 14 March 2010. Mulder went on to make ten appearances later in the 2009–10 season and gained four clean sheets in ten league appearances. For his performance, the club began talks over a new contract. Then it was announced on 22 April 2010, that he had signed a new contract with the club, taking him up to 2013.

==== Becoming the first choice goalkeeper (2010–2014) ====
In the 2010–11 season, Mulder became the first choice goalkeeper at the club at the start of the season for several matches until he injured his hand during a match against Vitesse on 29 August 2010. After spending a month on the sidelines and having returned to fitness, he made his return from injury in a 1–1 draw against N.E.C. reserves on 25 October 2010. Though, it was not until 19 January 2011, when he made his league return in the De Klassieker, in a 2–0 loss against Ajax. Despite missing out several matches, due to personal reason and injury, Mulder remained first choice goalkeeper and finished the 2010–11 season, making nineteen appearances in all competitions.

The 2011–12 season saw the departure of Rob van Dijk to FC Utrecht on a free transfer, leaving Mulder to compete with Darley, Kostas Lambrou and Ronald Graafland to become Feyenoord's first choice keeper. He began in the starting line-up in goal and established himself in the starting eleven under new manager Ronald Koeman. Mulder made his first appearance of the 2011–12 season, in the opening game of the season, in a 2–0 win against Excelsior. As the 2011–12 season progressed, his form soon led to the club's technical director Martin van Geel commenting on his plans to offer the shot-stopper a new contract at the club, in hopes of helping him develop much further. Eventually, he signed a contract with the club, tying him until 2015. He also was an ever-present goalkeeper in the 2011–12 season, having made thirty-four appearances despite suffering a wrist injury.

In the 2012–13 season, Mulder continued to be the first choice goalkeeper at the start of the season until he suffered a toe injury during a match against Heracles on 26 August 2012. On 16 December 2012, he made his return from injury, in a 3–2 win over ADO Den Haag. Three days later, on 19 December 2012, he helped the club go through to the KNVB Cup when they beat Heerenveen 7–6 in the penalty–shootout, with Mulder saving two penalties. Following this, Mulder remained as first choice goalkeeper for the rest of the 2012–13 season, making thirty appearances in all competitions.

In the 2013–14 season, he continued to be the first choice keeper and in the De Klassieker against Ajax on 18 August 2013, he was at fault when he conceded a penalty in the 31st minute, which resulted in his being booked in the game, leading the opposition's team to successfully convert the penalty, in a 2–1 loss. He kept his place in the first-team despite facing competition from new signing Warner Hahn and helped the club go back to the winning ways in the first half of the season. Mulder then made his 100th league appearance for the club against Heerenveen on 9 December 2013, which saw them lose 2–1. Although he conceded two goals, he was named in the Team of the Week. In a match against Heracles Almelo on 18 December 2013 in the last 16 of the KNVB Cup, Mulder saved the only penalty from Ben Rienstra to send them through to the next round. As the 2013–14 season progressed, he continued to do so until he suffered a shoulder injury. He previously suffered a bruise on his metacarpal in early 2016. Despite this, Mulder finished the season, making thirty-seven appearances in all competitions.

==== Decline (2014–2015) ====
In the 2014–15 season, he played the first four matches at the start of the season and earned two clean sheets, one against ADO Den Haag and the other against Twente.

However, the arrival of Kenneth Vermeer on 31 August 2014, led to Mulder losing his spot in the first eleven and he spent most of the season on the substitutes' bench. It was because of this, that he trained alone In the Europa League game against Roma in the second leg, which saw them lose and eliminated from the tournament, Mulder received a red card, even though he was not playing, for an 'unacceptable gesture' "towards the linesman".

With his contract set to expire at the end of the 2014–15 season, it was soon announced that he would be leaving Feyenoord, making him a free agent.

=== Heerenveen ===
After leaving Feyenoord, Mulder signed for Heerenveen as a free agent, signing a two-year contract with the club on 11 July 2015, replacing outgoing keeper Kristoffer Nordfeldt, who left for Premier League side Swansea City, as well as, receiving the number one shirt.

He made his Heerenveen debut, in the opening game of the season, in a 3–1 win over De Graafschap. In a match against PEC Zwolle on 29 August 2015, Mulder captained the club for the first time, following the absence of Joey van den Berg, which saw the game finish level at 1–1. In a match against his former club, Feyenoord, on 18 October 2015, he played against them for the whole game, but conceded five goals, as Heereveen lost 5–2. In the next game against Willem II on 24 October 2015, Mulder made amends from his mistake in the previous game when he saved a penalty from Stijn Wuytens in a 2–2 draw. He went on to captain the club on eight occasions and in his first season at the club, he made thirty-seven appearances (playing all the matches in the league).

=== Swansea City ===
After leaving Heerenveen on 29 June 2017, Mulder joined Swansea as a free agent, signing a three-year contract with the club.

=== Go Ahead Eagles ===
On 2 August 2022, Mulder signed with Go Ahead Eagles for one season.

== International career ==
Having previously been called up by Netherlands U17 and Netherlands U19, Mulder was called up to be in the Netherlands B squad.

Following this, he was further called up for the Netherlands U20 squad. He made his debut against Argentina on 3 June 2009 and was then called up to the Netherlands U21 squad.

On 7 May 2012, Mulder was named in the provisional list of 36 players for the Euro 2012 tournament, one of nine uncapped players to be chosen by Netherlands manager Bert van Marwijk as part of the preliminary squad. After training with the national team, it was announced that Mulder was cut from the squad ahead of Euro 2012.

== Coaching career ==
In October 2024, Mulder began coaching goalkeepers in the Vitesse academy. In June 2025, he was appointed first-team team manager while continuing his academy goalkeeping duties.

== Personal life ==
On 4 March 2011, Mulder's father died of a heart attack, at age 56, and as a result, Mulder took bereavement leave, meaning he would miss several matches.

== Career statistics ==
Appearances and goals by club, season and competition
Club	Season	League			National cup		League cup		Other		Total	
Club	Season	Division	Apps	Goals	Apps	Goals	Apps	Goals	Apps	Goals	Apps	Goals
Feyenoord	2007–08	Eredivisie	1	0	0	0	—		—		1	0
Feyenoord	2008–09	Eredivisie	0	0	—		—		—		0	0
Feyenoord	2009–10	Eredivisie	10	0	3	0	—		—		13	0
Feyenoord	2010–11	Eredivisie	17	0	0	0	—		2 (Note: Appearance(s) in UEFA Europa League)	0	19	0
Feyenoord	2011–12	Eredivisie	34	0	0	0	—		—		34	0
Feyenoord	2012–13	Eredivisie	22	0	2	0	—		4 (Note: Two appearances in UEFA Champions League; two appearances in UEFA Europa League)	0	28	0
Feyenoord	2013–14	Eredivisie	32	0	3	0	—		2	0	37	0
Feyenoord	2014–15	Eredivisie	4	0	0	0	—		4	0	8	0
Feyenoord	Total		120	0	8	0	—		12	0	140	0
Excelsior (loan)	2008–09	Eerste Divisie	36	0	3	0	—		2 (Note: Appearance(s) in Eerste Divisie promotion play-offs)	0	41	0
SC Heerenveen	2015–16	Eredivisie	34	0	3	0	—		—		37	0
SC Heerenveen	2016–17	Eredivisie	34	0	4	0	—		2 (Note: Appearance(s) in Eredivisie european competition play-offs)	0	40	0
SC Heerenveen	Total		68	0	7	0	—		2	0	77	0
Swansea City	2017–18	Premier League	0	0	0	0	0	0	—		0	0
Swansea City	2018–19	Championship	25	0	2	0	0	0	—		27	0
Swansea City	2019–20	Championship	4	0	0	0	0	0	2 (Note: Appearance(s) in Championship play-offs)	0	6	0
Swansea City	Total		29	0	2	0	0	0	2	0	33	0
SC Heerenveen	2020–21	Eredivisie	34	0	4	0	—		—		38	0
SC Heerenveen	2021–22	Eredivisie	19	0	0	0	—		2	0	21	0
SC Heerenveen	Total		53	0	4	0	—		2	0	59	0
Go Ahead Eagles	2022–23	Eredivisie	0	0	1	0	—		—		1	0
Go Ahead Eagles	2023–24	Eredivisie	0	0	1	0	—		—		1	0
Go Ahead Eagles	Total		0	0	2	0	—		—		2	0
Career total			306	0	26	0	0	0	20	0	352	0

== Honours ==
Feyenoord

- KNVB Cup: 2007–08
