= Miquel Nelom =

Dutch footballer

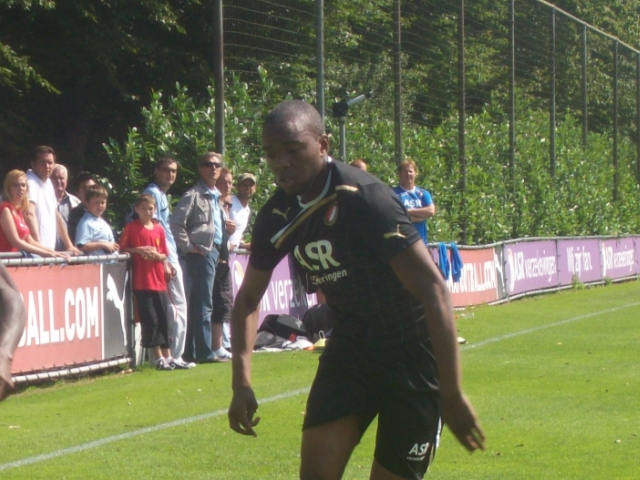
- Nelom in training

Personal information
- Full name: Paddy Miquel Nelom
- Date of birth: 22 September 1990 (age 36)
- Place of birth: Spijkenisse, Netherlands
- Height: 1.74 m (5 ft 9 in)
- Position: Left back

Youth career
- VV Spijkenisse
- Feyenoord

Senior career*
Years	Team	Apps	(Gls)
2009–2011	Excelsior	36	(0)
2011–2018	Feyenoord	125	(2)
2018	→ Sparta (loan)	10	(0)
2018–2019	Hibernian	3	(0)
2019–2022	Willem II	27	(0)

International career^{‡}
2012	Netherlands U20	4	(0)
2012	Netherlands U21	1	(0)
2013	Netherlands	2	(0)
- * Club domestic league appearances and goals as of 15 May 2022 ‡ National team caps and goals as of 20 May 2019

Miquel Nelom (born 22 September 1990) is a Dutch professional footballer who plays as a left back. Nelom has previously played in his homeland for Excelsior, Feyenoord, Sparta Rotterdam and Willem II, and for Scottish club Hibernian. He represented the Netherlands in two full international matches, both in 2013.

== Club career ==
Nelom made his professional debut for Excelsior on 9 October 2009. He replaced Tobias Waisapy in the 90th minute of an Eerste Divisie away match against HFC Haarlem (0–1). With Excelsior's surprising promotion in the season 2010–11, Nelom managed to make his Eredivisie debut on 7 August 2010. However, he couldn't prevent Excelsior losing the season opening match against De Graafschap (3–0).

Nelom moved to Feyenoord in 2011. He played in over 100 Eredivisie matches for the club, helping them win the league championship in 2016–17 and the Dutch Cup in 2015–16. After a loan spell with Sparta Rotterdam in the early part of 2018, Nelom left Feyenoord at the end of the 2017–18 season.

Nelom signed a one-year contract with Scottish Premiership club Hibernian on 20 September 2018. He was released by Hibernian in May 2019.

He signed for Willem II in September 2019.

== International career ==
Born in the Netherlands, Nelom is of Surinamese descent. In May 2013, Nelom was part of the Netherlands national team for a mini-tour of Asia. Nelom made his full international debut in a friendly against Indonesia.

== Career statistics ==
=== Club ===
As of 06:58, 12 May 2019 (UTC)

Club	Season	League			Cup		Continental		Other		Total	
Club	Season	Division	Apps	Goals	Apps	Goals	Apps	Goals	Apps	Goals	Apps	Goals
Excelsior	2009–10	Eerste Divisie	4	0	—		—		—		4	0
Excelsior	2010–11	Eredivisie	32	0	2	0	—		4	0	38	0
Excelsior	Total		36	0	2	0	0	0	4	0	42	0
Feyenoord	2011–12	Eredivisie	18	0	—		—		—		18	0
Feyenoord	2012–13	Eredivisie	20	0	2	0	4	1	—		26	1
Feyenoord	2013–14	Eredivisie	18	2	3	0	1	0	—		22	2
Feyenoord	2014–15	Eredivisie	30	0	1	0	9	0	2	0	42	0
Feyenoord	2015–16	Eredivisie	16	0	3	0	0	0	–		19	0
Feyenoord	2016–17	Eredivisie	17	0	1	0	3	0	1	0	22	0
Feyenoord	2017–18	Eredivisie	6	0	1	0	1	0	—		8	0
Feyenoord	Total		125	2	11	0	18	1	3	0	157	3
Sparta Rotterdam	2017–18	Eredivisie	10	0	—		—		—		10	0
Hibernian	2018–19	Scottish Premiership	3	0	—		—		—		3	0
Career total			174	2	13	0	18	1	7	0	212	3

=== International ===
As of matches played on 11 June 2013.

Dutch national team
Year	Apps	Goals
2013	2	0
Total	2	0

== Honours ==
Feyenoord

- Eredivisie: 2016–17
- KNVB Cup: 2015–16
- Johan Cruijff Shield: 2017
