= Stefan Babović =

Serbian footballer (born 1987)

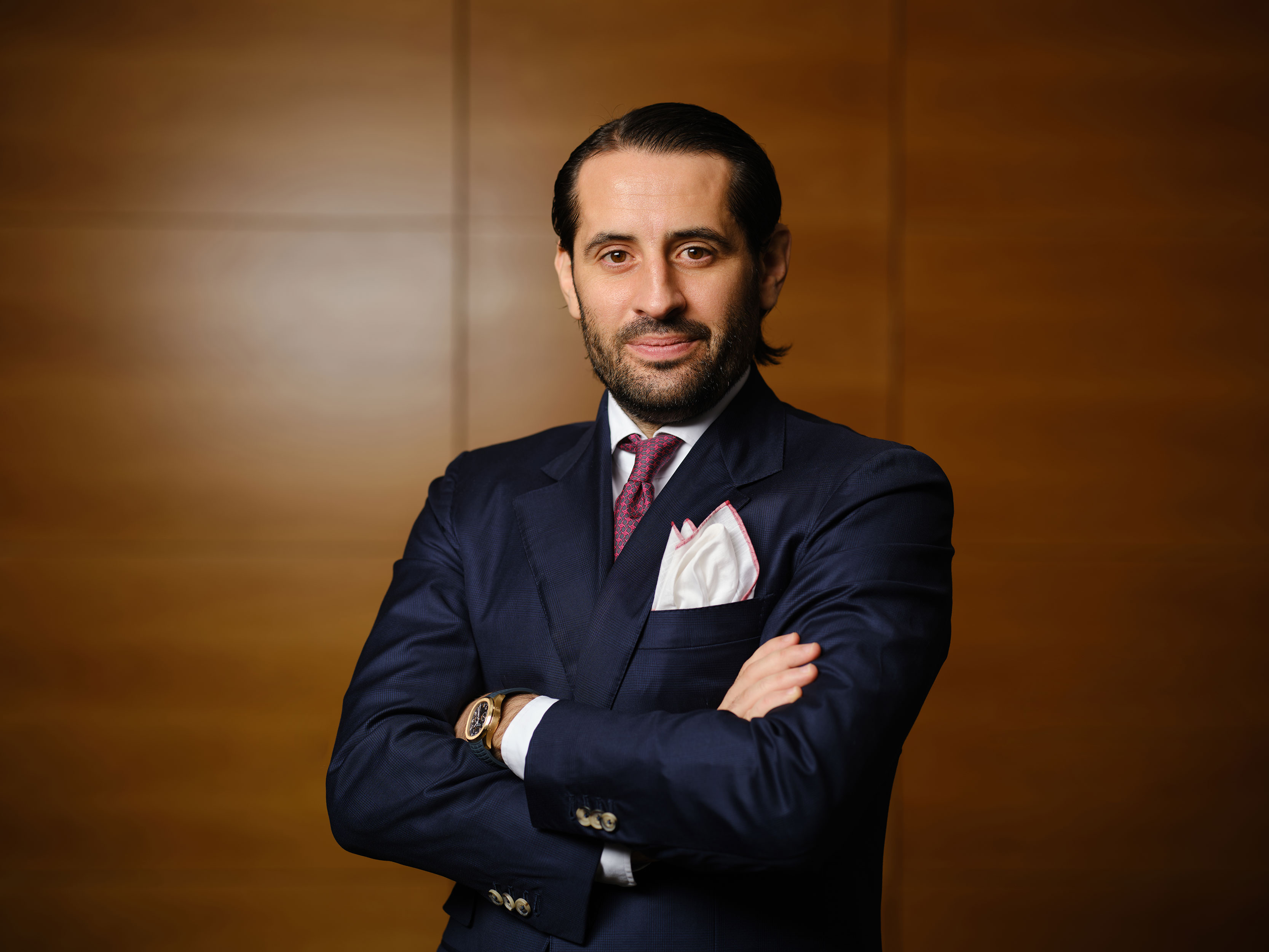
- Babović

Personal information
- Full name: Stefan Babović
- Date of birth: 7 January 1987 (age 39)
- Place of birth: Ivangrad, SR Montenegro, SFR Yugoslavia

Youth career
- 1995–2004: Partizan

Senior career*
Years	Team	Apps	(Gls)
2004–2006	Partizan	36	(4)
2006–2008	OFK Beograd	42	(9)
2008–2010	Nantes	33	(0)
2009–2010	→ Feyenoord (loan)	10	(1)
2010–2012	Partizan	51	(12)
2012–2013	Zaragoza	9	(0)
2013–2015	Voždovac	31	(7)
2015–2016	Partizan	26	(5)
Total		238	(38)

International career
2003	Serbia and Montenegro U17 (Note: Only official UEFA matches included)	3	(1)
2004–2006	Serbia and Montenegro U19	5	(0)
2006–2008	Serbia U21	15	(5)
2007–2008	Serbia	4	(0)
Medal record
Silver medal – second place	UEFA Under-21 Championship	2007
- * Club domestic league appearances and goals

Stefan Babović (Serbian Cyrillic: Стефан Бабовић; born 7 January 1987) is a Serbian former professional footballer who played as a deep-lying playmaker. He is the current (CEO) of Fashion Company.

During his footballing career, Babović represented seven clubs, most notably Partizan with 157 appearances and 26 goals across all competitions in three separate spells. He also played abroad in France, the Netherlands, and Spain.

After representing his country at all youth levels, Babović made his full international debut for Serbia in late 2007. He earned three more caps the following year, his last national team appearances at only 21 years of age.

== Club career ==
=== Partizan and OFK Beograd ===
Babović was born in Ivangrad, SFR Yugoslavia (present-day Berane, Montenegro) but grew up in Belgrade where he came through the youth ranks at Partizan and made his senior debut at the age of 17, coming on as a substitute in a 3–0 home win over Sutjeska Nikšić on 17 March 2004. He also spent some time with affiliated club Teleoptik on dual registration. On 8 January 2005, a day after his 18th birthday, Babović signed his first professional contract with Partizan, on a five-year deal. He was also a member of the team that won the league title in 2005. After the retirement of Dragan Ćirić, Babović was given the number 10 shirt. He played 23 league matches and scored three goals in the 2005–06 season. In August 2006, Babović eventually left Partizan after a disagreement with manager Miodrag Ješić.

After parting ways with Partizan, Babović joined OFK Beograd as a free agent, penning a four-year contract. He quickly fit into a talented team and played great for the club, which coincided with his prolific performances for the youth national team.

=== Nantes and Feyenoord ===
On 13 December 2007, it was announced that Babović moved to France to join Ligue 2 club Nantes. The transfer officially went through on 1 January 2008. During his first six months at the Stade de la Beaujoire, Babović made 15 league appearances, scoring no goals, as the club won promotion to the Ligue 1. He repeated the same performances in the next season, but the club failed to avoid relegation.

On 1 September 2009, after featuring in Nantes' first three league matches of the campaign, Babović was sent on loan to Feyenoord until the end of the 2009–10 season, with a buyout clause. He was given the number 15 shirt. On 1 November 2009, Babović was sent off during the Klassieker in Amsterdam for elbowing Ajax defender Jan Vertonghen.

After serving his suspension, Babović returned to the lineup for the match against Groningen and scored his first Eredivisie goal, an equalizer in a 3–1 victory. At the end of the season, it was announced that Feyenoord would not offer Babović a new contract. Eventually, Babović returned to France and terminated his contract with Nantes by mutual agreement in June 2010.

=== Return to Partizan ===
On 16 August 2010, after almost two months of training with his parent club, Babović eventually signed a two-year contract with Partizan. He scored eight league goals in his comeback season with the Crno-beli, being named in the 2010–11 SuperLiga Team of the Season, thus helping them win their fourth title in a row. In European competitions, Babović recorded four appearances in the group stage of the UEFA Champions League, as the club finished bottom of the table. He also scored two goals in four games in the Serbian Cup, helping Partizan win the trophy.

In the following 2011–12 season, Babović won his second consecutive championship with Partizan, while earning a place in the SuperLiga Team of the Season for the second time in a row.

=== Zaragoza and Voždovac ===
In August 2012, Babović signed a three-year deal with Zaragoza. He made his official debut for the club in a 0–2 away loss to Real Sociedad on 16 September 2012. Over the course of the 2012–13 season, Babović made nine league appearances, only to have his contract annulled in the summer of 2013, following the club's relegation from the Primera División.

On the last day of the 2013 summer transfer window, Babović signed with Voždovac on a free transfer. He made 21 league appearances and scored three times in the 2013–14 season, as the club finished in 7th place in their comeback season in the top flight. Despite transfer speculation in the summer of 2014, Babović eventually stayed and spent another six months at Voždovac.

=== Third stint at Partizan ===
On 14 January 2015, Babović officially returned to his former club Partizan. He signed a three-year contract and was given the number 10 shirt, previously worn by the departing Ismaël Béko Fofana. On 21 February 2015, Babović made his third debut for Partizan, playing the full 90 minutes in a home league fixture against his former club Voždovac; the game ended in a 3–3 draw. He scored his first goal for the club in a 2–2 away draw with Čukarički on 22 March 2015. Babović recorded a total of 12 league appearances and scored two goals in the second part of the 2014–15 season, as the club won the title. He was again named in the competition's best eleven due to his performances throughout the season for both Voždovac and Partizan.

On 14 July 2015, Babović netted his first goal in UEFA competitions, scoring from a free kick to give his team a 1–0 win over Dila Gori. He also scored the opener in a 4–2 home victory over Steaua București on 5 August 2015.

On 14 January 2016, Babović terminated his contract with Partizan by mutual consent.

== International career ==
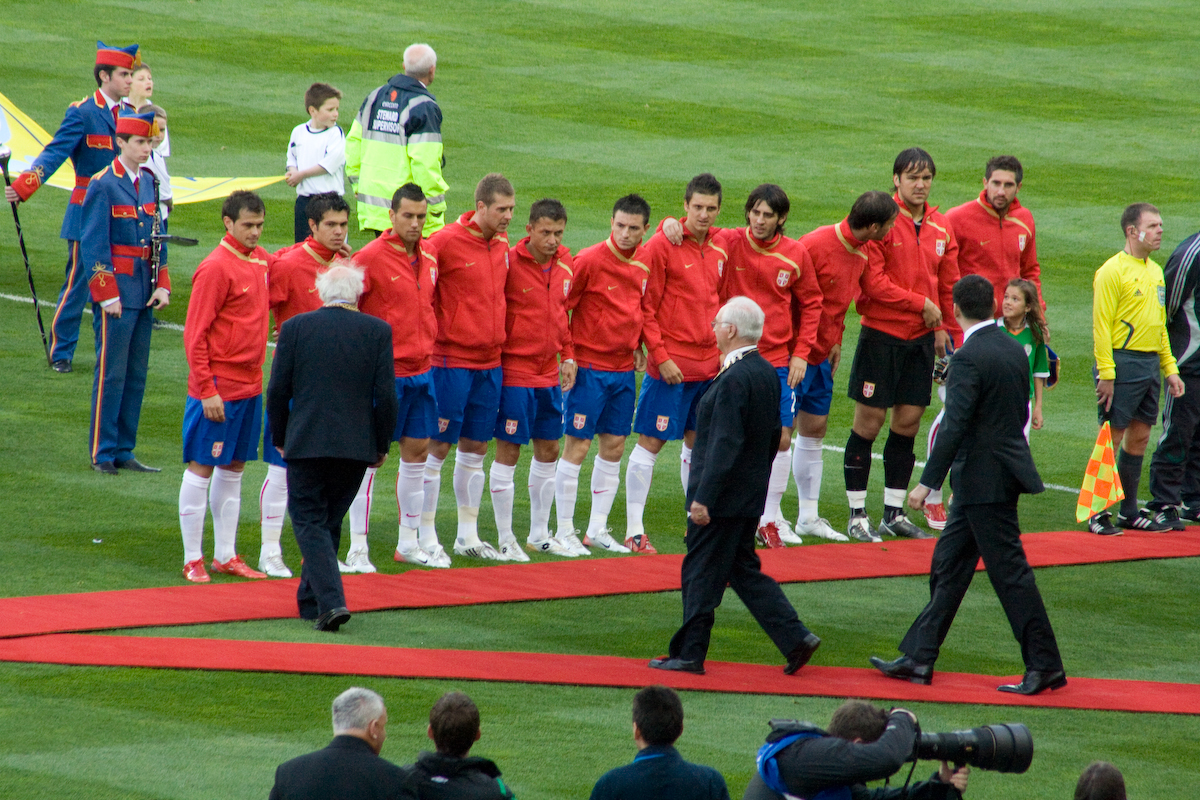
Babović (fourth from right) lining up for Serbia before a friendly against Republic of Ireland in May 2008

A former Serbia and Montenegro U17 and U19 international, Babović was unused substitute in the 2006 UEFA European Under-21 Championship in Portugal. He was subsequently Serbia's top scorer during the 2007 Championship qualifying stage; two of his three goals came in the stunning play-off comeback against Sweden. In the summer of 2007, Babović was named in the 23-man squad for the final tournament held in the Netherlands. Serbia ended the tournament as a runner-up, losing 1–4 to the hosts in the final.

After appearing in an unofficial friendly against the Basque Country in December 2006, Babović made his official debut for the senior national team under Javier Clemente in a rescheduled UEFA Euro 2008 qualifier against Kazakhstan on 24 November 2007. The match ended with a 1–0 victory for Serbia. He later appeared in three friendlies under newly appointed manager Miroslav Đukić in 2008. His final international was a May 2008 friendly match away against Germany.

Following the end of his professional football career, Babović transitioned into the business sector.

== Statistics ==
=== Club ===
Appearances and goals by club, season and competition
Club	Season	League		Cup		League Cup		Continental		Total	
Club	Season	Apps	Goals	Apps	Goals	Apps	Goals	Apps	Goals	Apps	Goals
Partizan	2003–04	4	0	0	0	—		0	0	4	0
Partizan	2004–05	9	1	1	0	—		1	0	11	1
Partizan	2005–06	23	3	2	0	—		2	0	27	3
Partizan	Total	36	4	3	0	—		3	0	42	4
OFK Beograd	2006–07	27	6	2	0	—		0	0	29	6
OFK Beograd	2007–08	15	3	0	0	—		—		15	3
OFK Beograd	Total	42	9	2	0	—		0	0	44	9
Nantes	2007–08	15	0	1	0	0	0	—		16	0
Nantes	2008–09	15	0	1	0	0	0	—		16	0
Nantes	2009–10	3	0	0	0	1	0	—		4	0
Nantes	Total	33	0	2	0	1	0	—		36	0
Feyenoord (loan)	2009–10	10	1	3	1	—		—		13	2
Partizan	2010–11	22	8	4	2	—		4	0	30	10
Partizan	2011–12	29	4	4	1	—		5	0	38	5
Partizan	2012–13	0	0	0	0	—		5	0	5	0
Partizan	Total	51	12	8	3	—		14	0	73	15
Zaragoza	2012–13	9	0	2	0	—		—		11	0
Voždovac	2013–14	21	3	1	0	—		—		22	3
Voždovac	2014–15	10	4	2	3	—		—		12	7
Voždovac	Total	31	7	3	3	—		—		34	10
Partizan	2014–15	12	2	3	0	—		0	0	15	2
Partizan	2015–16	14	3	2	0	—		11	2	27	5
Partizan	Total	26	5	5	0	—		11	2	42	7
Career total		238	38	28	7	1	0	28	2	295	47

=== International ===
National team	Year	Apps	Goals
Serbia	2007	1	0
Serbia	2008	3	0
Total		4	0

== Honours ==
=== Club ===
Partizan

- Serbian SuperLiga: 2004–05, 2010–11, 2011–12, 2014–15
- Serbian Cup: 2010–11

=== International ===
Serbia

- UEFA Under-21 Championship: Runner-up 2007

=== Individual ===
- Serbian SuperLiga Team of the Season: 2010–11, 2011–12, 2014–15

== Business career ==
In January 2023, Babović was appointed Chief Executive Officer of Fashion Company. In this role, he is responsible for managing the company's operations and implementing its strategic objectives across Southeast European markets.

The company represents more than 80 international fashion brands and operates across several regional markets. At Fashion Company, Babović is involved in business development activities and the expansion of the company's retail network in Serbia and the region.

In mid-2016, he joined Victoria Group., where he served as Deputy Chief Executive Officer. He was later appointed . chief operations officer (COO) of Serbian holding company with responsibility for coordinating business activities and overseeing operational management across the group

=== Memberships and Positions ===
Babović served as Vice President of OFK Beograd.

He has also participated in the work of business organizations and associations in Serbia, including the American Chamber of Commerce in Serbia (AmCham), the Foreign Investors Council (FIC), and the National Alliance for Local Economic Development (NALED).
