= Darley (footballer) =

Brazilian footballer (born 1989)

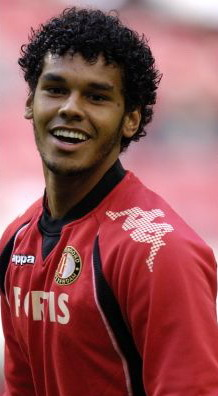

Personal information
- Full name: Darley Ramon Torres
- Date of birth: 15 December 1989 (age 36)
- Place of birth: Pedro Leopoldo, Brazil
- Height: 1.87 m (6 ft 2 in)
- Position: Goalkeeper

Team information
- Current team: Retrô
- Number: 1

Youth career
- –2007: Atlético Mineiro
- 2007–2009: Feyenoord U-19

Senior career*
Years	Team	Apps	(Gls)
2007	Atlético Mineiro	7	(0)
2007–2012	Feyenoord	5	(0)
2012	Náutico	0	(0)
2013	Criciúma	0	(0)
2014–2019	Tombense	137	(0)
2014	→ América-MG (loan)	0	(0)
2018	→ Boa Esporte (loan)	2	(0)
2019	→ Botafogo-SP (loan)	44	(0)
2020–2021	Botafogo-SP	44	(0)
2021	CSA	13	(0)
2022–2023	Mirassol	32	(0)
2024–	Retrô	11	(0)
- * Club domestic league appearances and goals as of 29 September 2024

Darley Ramon Torres (born 15 December 1989), commonly known as Darley, is a Brazilian footballer. He currently plays as a goalkeeper for Retrô.

== Early life ==
Darley was born in Pedro Leopoldo, Minas Gerais, Brazil.

== Club career ==
=== Atlético Mineiro (2007) ===
Darley started his professional career at Atlético Mineiro. At the age of 17, Darley made his debut on the highest level, playing a total of seven matches for the club from Belo Horizonte. On 13 December 2007, Darley had a successful trial period at the Dutch Eredivisie club Feyenoord. One month later, Feyenoord officially announced the arrival of the goalkeeper.

=== Feyenoord (2007–2012) ===
On 19 February 2008, Darley signed a four-and-a-half-year contract with Feyenoord. To slowly adapt to a new culture and lifestyle, Darley first joined the Feyenoord U19 squad for the seasons 2007–08 and 2008–09.

For the season 2009–10, Feyenoord decided not to renew first team goalkeeper Henk Timmer's contract. During pre-season, Darley had to battle with reserve goalkeeper Rob van Dijk and the returning Erwin Mulder, who came back from a season loan spell at Excelsior, for a regular place under the bar. After solid performances in the pre-season friendly wins against Sporting Clube de Portugal (1–2) and Sampdoria (3–0), Darley came out as winner. On 2 August 2009, Darley made his official Feyenoord debut in the Eredivisie home match against N.E.C. (2–0). Unfortunately, Darley had to be substituted during half time due to a knee injury, causing Darley to be sidelined for almost two months. Van Dijk replaced the youngster and has remained first team goalkeeper since. Darley's second appearance came on 8 November 2009 against AZ Alkmaar following Van Dijk's red card against Ajax Amsterdam the week before.

Following his persistent hip injury which restricted his first team appearances at Feyenoord, Darley was allowed to return to Brazil before his contract ended.

== Statistics ==
Club performance			League		Cup		Continental		Total	
Season	Club	League	Apps	Goals	Apps	Goals	Apps	Goals	Apps	Goals
Brazil			League		Copa do Brasil		South America		Total	
2007	Atlético Mineiro	Série A	7	0	0	0	0	0	7	0
Netherlands			League		KNVB Cup		Europe		Total	
2007–08	Feyenoord	Eredivisie	0	0	0	0	0	0	0	0
2008–09	Feyenoord	Eredivisie	0	0	0	0	0	0	0	0
2009–10	Feyenoord	Eredivisie	2	0	0	0	0	0	2	0
Total	Brazil		7	0	0	0	0	0	7	0
Total	Netherlands		2	0	0	0	0	0	2	0
Career total			9	0	0	0	0	0	9	0

Statistics accurate as of last match played on 8 November 2009.

== Honours ==
Tombense

- Campeonato Brasileiro Série D: 2014

CSA

- Campeonato Alagoano: 2021

Mirassol

- Campeonato Brasileiro Série C: 2022

Retrô

- Campeonato Brasileiro Série D: 2024
