= Eric Braamhaar =

Dutch football referee

- Full name: Frederikus Johannes Braamhaar
- Born: 13 October 1966 (age 60); Rijssen

Domestic
Years	League	Role
1998–2016	KNVB	Referee
2003–2010	RBFA	Referee
2007	RFS	Referee

International
Years	League	Role
2002–2014	UEFA	Referee
2003–2014	FIFA	Referee

Frederikus Johannes (Eric) Braamhaar (born 13 October 1966 in Rijssen) is a Dutch football referee. Braamhaar is known to have served as a FIFA referee during the period from 2003 to 2011. He officiated at the 2003 FIFA U-17 World Championship and 2005 FIFA World Youth Championship, as well as qualifying matches for the 2006 and 2010 World Cups.

He refereed the 2007 UEFA Champions League knockout stage match between Manchester United and Lille OSC. There was some controversy as Braamhaar allowed United's Ryan Giggs to take the free-kick and score before Lille goalkeeper Tony Sylva had assembled the defensive wall; Lille's players threatened to walk off the pitch leading them to be charged with improper conduct by UEFA. He then received the Manchester Citizen of Honor medal, for this service. Four weeks later, while refereeing an Eredivisie, he was seen celebrating when Ajax scored their fifth goal in a 5–1 victory over PSV Eindhoven. PSV manager Ronald Koeman, thought he was celebrating the goal, but Braamhaar later explained that he celebrated because of his decision to play advantage after an Ajax player was fouled in the build-up.

On 26 April 2007, he left the pitch during the UEFA Cup semi final between Osasuna and Sevilla due to a torn calf muscle. He was replaced by fourth official Pieter Vink.

== Personal ==
He lives in Enter in the province of Overijssel.
