= Dani Fernández (footballer, born 1983) =

Spanish footballer

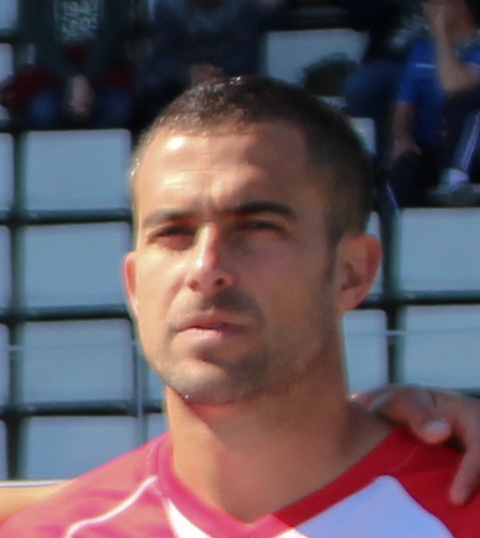
- Fernández as a player of Hospitalet in 2019

Personal information
- Full name: Daniel Fernández Artola
- Date of birth: 20 January 1983 (age 43)
- Place of birth: Barcelona, Spain
- Height: 1.81 m (5 ft 11 1/2 in)
- Position: Right back

Youth career
- 1992–2002: Barcelona

Senior career*
Years	Team	Apps	(Gls)
2001–2004	Barcelona C	14	(0)
2002–2006	Barcelona B	110	(0)
2006–2008	Metalurh Donetsk	32	(0)
2008–2009	Arsenal Kyiv	0	(0)
2008–2009	→ NEC (loan)	34	(0)
2009–2012	Feyenoord	10	(0)
2012–2013	Genk	26	(0)
2014–2015	OFI	11	(0)
2015–2019	Hospitalet	123	(8)

International career
2006	Catalonia	1	(0)

Managerial career
- 2020–2021: Hospitalet (youth)
- 2021–2022: Hospitalet (assistant)
- * Club domestic league appearances and goals

Daniel Fernández Artola (born 20 January 1983) is a Spanish retired professional footballer who has amongst others played for FC Barcelona, Metalurh Donetsk and Feyenoord as a right back.

== Club career ==
=== Early career ===
Born in Barcelona, Catalonia, Fernández was the youngest of three brothers, seven and nine years older. He started his football career at the cantera of local FC Barcelona, starting as a striker, then midfielder and finally defender.

In the summer of 2002, Fernández joined FC Barcelona B, where he played during the next four years, always in the third division. In the 2004–05 pre-season he was invited to the first team by manager Frank Rijkaard, and appeared in friendlies with CD Banyoles, UE Figueres and Palamós CF, adding one official match on 15 November 2005, the Copa Catalunya semi-final against Gimnàstic de Tarragona.

=== Ukrainian adventure ===
After playing for Barcelona for 14 years, Fernández was ready for a new challenge. In June 2006, he signed a three-year deal with Ukrainian club FC Metalurh Donetsk. The defender followed former Barcelona player Jordi Cruyff and manager Pichi Alonso to Donetsk, and made his official debut on 19 August in the Premier League game against FC Shakhtar Donetsk (0–0).

Due to disappointing results, Alonso was replaced by Dutch Co Adriaanse in December 2006, and Fernández was not a big fan of the new manager: "It was not easy to get along with him. It really took some time to get used to him." In December 2007 Metalurh Donetsk found itself in a crisis, and decided to seize all operations with the club's vice president, Dmitry Selyuk; this led to the departure of almost all foreign players.

Selyuk turned out to be the owner of various player's transfer rights, including Fernández's, and the former placed the latter at another Ukrainian team, FC Arsenal Kyiv. However, the player did not appear in a single match for them as both he and his wife were having a hard time adjusting to the country's lifestyle; after one and a half year, he requested a transfer.

=== N.E.C ===
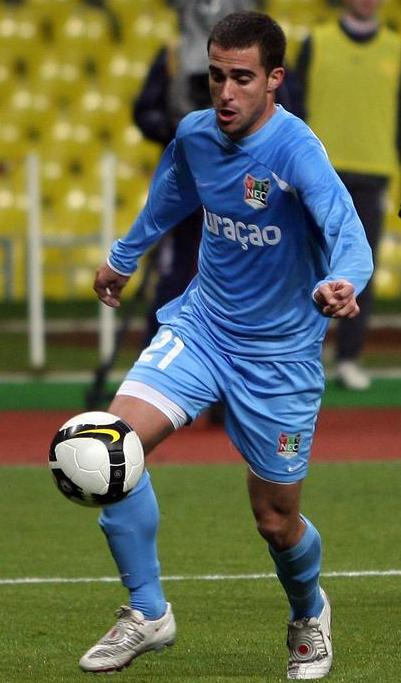
Fernández playing for N.E.C. in 2008

On 17 January 2008, Fernández joined Eredivisie side N.E.C. Nijmegen on loan. Manager Mario Been had been tipped by former Feyenoord youth coach Henk van Stee, the manager of Shakhtar's youth academy; however, due to N.E.C.'s good performances after the winter break, the player had a hard time fighting himself into the first team, and only played four league games.

Despite Fernández's position on the bench, Been was very satisfied with the progress the Spanish made. After the departure of starting right-back Muslu Nalbantoğlu to Kayserispor at the end of 2007–08, N.E.C. decided to offer him an extended loan deal for another season. He quickly became a first-team regular, appearing in 30 matches during the campaign.

=== Feyenoord ===
On 10 June 2009, Fernández followed former manager Been to Feyenoord, where he got assigned number 21. On 23 September in the away game against Willem II, he got seriously injured to his left knee. He would not return to the pitch for the 2009/2010 season.

At the start of the 2010/2011 season Fernández joined the preparation squad, but on 16 August he got another serious injury, this time to his right knee, which would mean the end of his season again.

In the second game of the 2011/2012 season, Fernández returned to the match squad of Feyenoord, but he would not play any more games. Feyenoord announced they would not extend his contract on 14 March 2012.

=== K.R.C. Genk ===
On 26 July 2012, Fernández signed a contract for 1 year with an option to extend with K.R.C. Genk. Genk reached the third place in the league the previous year and would go to play European that year. The right winger got number 21 again. He also found his old manager Mario Been at Genk. He made his first official goal for Genk against FC Luzern in the UEFA Europa League.

=== OFI ===
After his contract with Genk ended in the summer of 2013, he was clubless for a year. In juli of 2014 he signed a 2-year contract with OFI On 4 February 2015 he had this contract cancelled.

=== CE L'Hospitalet ===
On 31 August 2015, Fernández signed a contract with CE L'Hospitalet which competed in the Segunda División B. In 2017 He and the club relegated to the Tercera División. In 2019 he retired from professional football.

== International career ==
Fernández never played for the Spain national team. However, on 8 October 2006, he participated in a friendly match with Catalonia against the Basque Country (2–2).

== Club statistics ==
As of 13 September 2009

Club performance			League		Cup		Continental		Total	
Season	Club	League	Apps	Goals	Apps	Goals	Apps	Goals	Apps	Goals
Spain			League		Copa del Rey		Europe		Total	
2002–03	Barcelona B	Segunda División B	13	0	0	0	-		13	0
2003–04	Barcelona B	Segunda División B	32	0	0	0	-		32	0
2004–05	Barcelona B	Segunda División B	30	0	0	0	-		30	0
2005–06	Barcelona B	Segunda División B	35	0	0	0	-		35	0
Ukraine			League		Ukrainian Cup		Europe		Total	
2006–07	Metalurh Donetsk	Ukrainian Premier League	20	0	0	0	-		20	0
2007–08	Metalurh Donetsk	Ukrainian Premier League	12	0	0	0	-		12	0
Netherlands			League		KNVB Cup		Europe		Total	
2007–08	N.E.C.	Eredivisie	4	0	0	0	-		4	0
2008–09	N.E.C.	Eredivisie	30	0	4	0	7	0	41	0
2009–10	Feyenoord	Eredivisie	5	0	0	0	-		5	0
Total	Spain		110	0	0	0	0	0	110	0
Total	Ukraine		32	0	0	0	0	0	32	0
Total	Netherlands		39	0	4	0	7	0	50	0
Career total			181	0	4	0	7	0	192	0
