= Mario Been =

Dutch footballer and manager

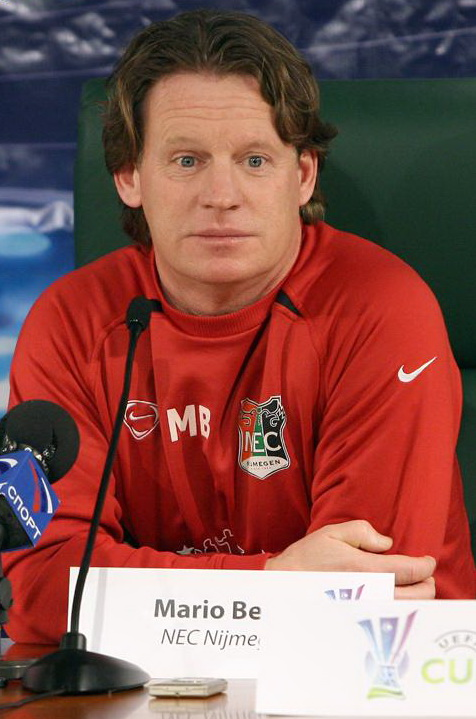
- Been with N.E.C. in 2008

Personal information
- Full name: Marinus Antonius Been
- Date of birth: 11 December 1963 (age 62)
- Place of birth: Rotterdam, Netherlands
- Height: 1.78 m (5 ft 10 in)
- Position: Midfielder

Youth career
- 1971–1972: FC Rotterdam
- 1972–1982: Feyenoord

Senior career*
Years	Team	Apps	(Gls)
1982–1988	Feyenoord	137	(53)
1988–1990	Pisa	62	(6)
1990–1991	Roda JC	12	(1)
1991–1992	Heerenveen	24	(3)
1992–1993	Tirol Innsbruck	14	(1)
1993–1995	Excelsior	44	(14)
Total		293	(78)

International career
1984	Netherlands	1	(0)

Managerial career
- 1996–2000: Excelsior (youth)
- 2000–2004: Feyenoord (assistant)
- 2005–2006: Excelsior
- 2006–2009: N.E.C.
- 2009–2011: Feyenoord
- 2011–2014: Genk
- 2016–2017: Fenerbahçe (assistant)
- 2017: APOEL
- * Club domestic league appearances and goals

Marinus Antonius Been (born 11 December 1963) is a Dutch football manager and former professional player.

As a footballer, Been played for Feyenoord, Pisa, Roda JC, Heerenveen, Tirol Innsbruck and Excelsior. He played in an attacking midfield position and was nicknamed "Mariodona" for his dribbling skills, after Diego Maradona and his first name.

== Playing career ==
=== Club ===
Born in Rotterdam, South Holland, Been made his professional career debut for Feyenoord on 5 September 1982, in a 1–0 win over N.E.C. Been spent six years at Feyenoord from 1982 to 1988, before moving to Italian side Pisa in July 1988. During his time in Italy, the club played in Serie A (first) and Serie B (second). After three years in Italy, Been returned to Netherlands, where he joined Roda JC and then Heerenveen. After one season at Heerenveen, Been moved to Austria, joining Tirol Innsbruck in 1992. Following his stint at Tirol Innsbruck, he returned to Excelsior where he stayed for three years before announcing his retirement. Been played his last competitive match on 17 September 1995, when Haarlem defeated Excelsior 4–0.

=== International ===
Been was a member of the Dutch squad at the 1983 FIFA World Youth Championship and played one official international match for the Netherlands, against Austria on 14 November 1984 as substitute for Ton Lokhoff in the 73rd minute.

== Managerial career ==
Been started his coaching career as assistant manager to Bert van Marwijk at Feyenoord in 2000. He held this position until the summer of 2004 when Bert van Marwijk choose to leave Feyenoord and head to Germany to manage Borussia Dortmund. Been headed across Rotterdam to join Feyenoord's sister club Excelsior in 2005 and in his sole season in-charge of the club got them promoted from the Eerste Divisie to the Eredivisie. Along the way his team played attractive football and eventually finished seven points clear of second placed VVV Venlo.

=== Trinidad and Tobago ===
After his successful promotion season with Excelsior, Been moved to become the assistant manager to Leo Beenhakker at Trinidad and Tobago for the 2006 FIFA World Cup. After the World Cup, he left Trinidad and Tobago.

=== NEC ===
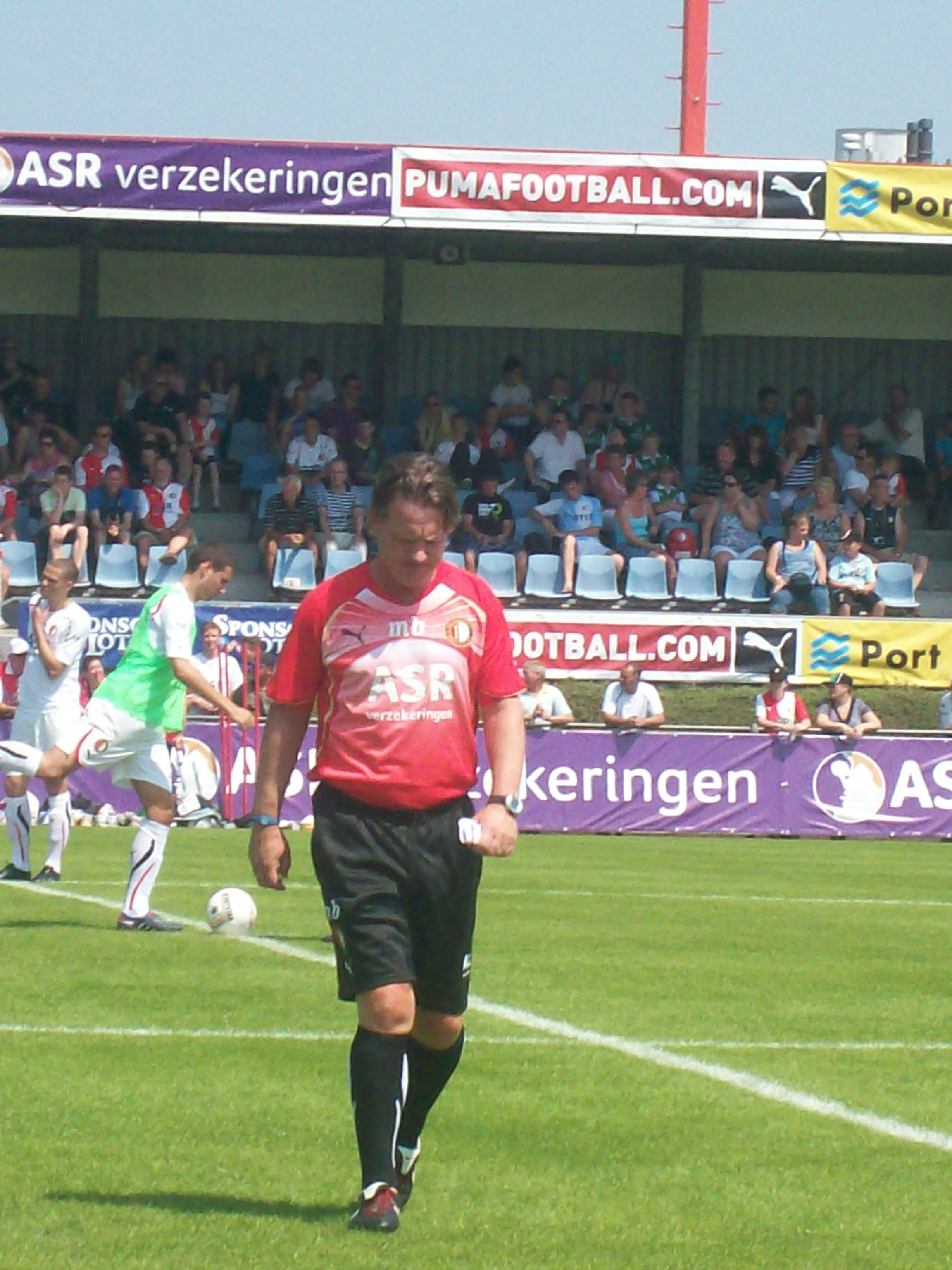
Mario Been during the first practice of Feyenoord.

Been moved to NEC, taking over from Ron de Groot. De Groot resumed his original position as an assistant-coach. Been came with ambition to return the glory years back to the club. In his first season, in 2006–07, he led the club to a tenth-place finish in the Eredivisie. With the signing of a few players during the summer of 2007, he molded a competitive and attractive team. However, the first half of the 2007–08 season did not go well for Been, as his side were sitting bottom of the league at the start of the new year. However, Been managed to remarkably change the fortunes of his team, as they went on a run which saw them eventually end eighth in the league standings. This earned the club a UEFA Cup Play-off berth against three other Dutch teams. Been got his team to play very attractive football, which resulted in plenty of goals. In the final play-off round against NAC Breda, his side won 6–0 at home, and 1–0 away. For the first time, Been had qualified a team for European competition.

The season of 2008–09 would be the finest season to date for Been as professional manager. His side were drawn in a tough group in the UEFA Cup with away games at Spartak Moscow and Dinamo Zagreb, while Tottenham Hotspur and Udinese would come to Nijmegen. At the start of the European campaign, his side were labeled the whipping boys of the group. However, after two losses in the group (3–2 against Dinamo Zagreb and 1–0 against Tottenham Hotspur), NEC managed to beat Spartak Moscow in Russia with a scoreline of 2–1. Lasse Schöne scoring the all-important goal in that match. The final and decisive game for Been would be against Udinese; on a wonderful night for the club, he managed to get the team to a 2–0 scoreline and secure progression to the next round. They eventually lost 4–0 on aggregate to Hamburger SV in the following round, but Been had already written himself into the club's history. On 28 January 2009, NEC Nijmegen and Feyenoord had reached an agreement to let Been move to Rotterdam to become the head coach there for the next season. On the occasion of his final match as manager for NEC, Been was applauded by a full Goffert Stadium, with fans singing his name and the players, board and fans giving him the honour of being one of the best managers the club has ever had. Been's farewell speech was filled with tears, however, his last words to the fans epitomized his legendary status at the club.

=== Feyenoord ===
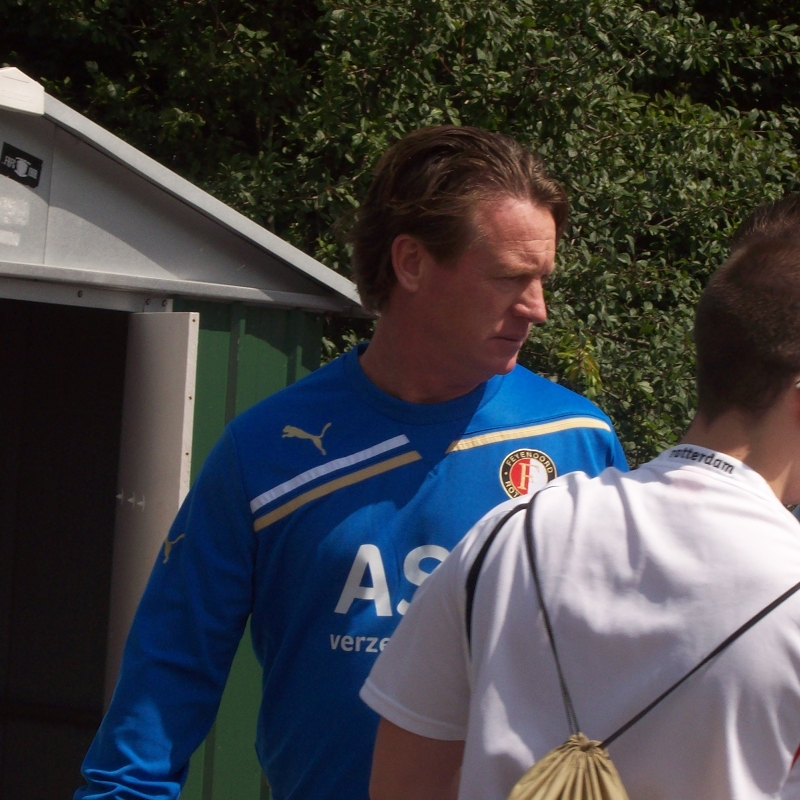
Been during his time with Feyenoord as manager

Been joined his boyhood club Feyenoord in the summer of 2009 in the hope of repairing the financially stricken club. He was given a very youthful squad to work with, which did have some experienced heads in the form of Roy Makaay, Denny Landzaat and Giovanni van Bronckhorst. His first signing was from his old club, where he signed Dani Fernández for the right-back position. Been's first season for Feyenoord was immediately a success, as he led them to a fourth-place finish in the league and thus a place in the Europa League for the 2010–11 season. This was also the club's highest finish for a few years. In a turbulent summer, which saw all his experienced heads retire, he signed only a handful of players on free transfers or on loan. Feyenoord started the campaign in mixed form. On the opening day, they beat Utrecht 3–1 to kick off a good start to the campaign. However, the club failed to qualify for the group stages of the Europa League, after they lost 2–1 to Gent on aggregate.

Up until 2011, Been had a contract that ran until 2012 with the club. On 24 October 2010, he oversaw his team losing 10–0 against PSV at the Philips Stadion, the biggest defeat in the history of Feyenoord. Despite that, and a rather disappointing final outcome that saw Feyenoord failing to qualify for European football and even in danger of relegation at some point in the season, he was confirmed at the helm of Feyenoord for the new season.

On 13 July 2011, Been was confirmed to have left his post as head coach of Feyenoord, citing lack of trust and confidence from his players as the main reason for his surprise choice.

=== Genk ===
In late August 2011, Been was appointed as a new manager of Genk, signing a two-year deal with them and succeeding Franky Vercauteren, who left the club to join United Arab Emirates side Al-Jazira (who led the club winning the Belgian League and 2011 Belgian Supercup and Vercauteren led his club into play-off for UEFA Champions League). A day after being named the new Coach for Genk, Been held his first training session with the club on Wednesday 31 August. Been would join-up with Thomas Buffel at Genk, who coached Buffel from his time as assistant manager at Feyenoord.

His first match as a Genk manager was a win, with Genk beating their rival Sint-Truidense 4–3. In the Champions League, Genk was placed fourth place in Group E and got three points with no win, three draws and three losses at the group stage of Champions League. Genk's first Champions League game against Valencia was a 0–0 draw, clinched their first Champions League point.

On 9 May 2013, he won the Belgian Cup with Genk. On 23 February 2014, he was sacked.

=== APOEL ===
On 26 May 2017, Been was appointed as the new manager of the reigning Cypriot champions APOEL, signing a one-year contract with the club.

On 28 July 2017, after three competitive games in charge, Been was sacked by APOEL following a 1–0 away European defeat to Viitorul Constanta.

== Managerial statistics ==
As of 26 July 2017.

Team	From	To	Competition	Record							
Team	From	To	Competition	G	W	D	L	GF	GA	GD	Win %
Excelsior	2005	2006	Eerste Divisie	38	22	9	7	68	25	+43	57.89
Excelsior	2005	2006	KNVB Cup	2	1	0	1	6	6	+0	50.00
Excelsior	2005	2006	Total	40	23	9	8	74	31	+43	57.50
N.E.C.	July 2006	9 June 2009	Eredivisie	102	35	30	37	126	134	−8	34.31
N.E.C.	July 2006	9 June 2009	KNVB Cup	9	6	0	3	19	11	+8	66.67
N.E.C.	July 2006	9 June 2009	Europe	8	3	1	4	7	9	−2	37.50
N.E.C.	July 2006	9 June 2009	Other (Note: Includes Johan Cruijff Shield and Eredivisie UEFA and Intertoto play-offs.)	10	7	1	2	17	6	+11	70.00
N.E.C.	July 2006	9 June 2009	Total	129	51	32	46	169	160	+9	39.53
Feyenoord	24 January 2009	13 July 2011	Eredivisie	68	29	20	19	107	85	+22	42.65
Feyenoord	24 January 2009	13 July 2011	KNVB Cup	8	5	1	2	15	8	+7	62.50
Feyenoord	24 January 2009	13 July 2011	Europe	2	1	0	1	1	2	−1	50.00
Feyenoord	24 January 2009	13 July 2011	Total	78	35	21	22	123	95	+28	44.87
Genk	30 August 2011	23 February 2014	Belgian Pro League	82	40	18	24	161	118	+43	48.78
Genk	30 August 2011	23 February 2014	Belgian Cup	9	6	0	3	21	6	+15	66.67
Genk	30 August 2011	23 February 2014	Europe	21	9	7	5	27	29	−2	42.86
Genk	30 August 2011	23 February 2014	Other (Note: Includes Belgian Super Cup.)	1	0	0	1	0	1	−1	0.00
Genk	30 August 2011	23 February 2014	Total	113	55	25	33	209	154	+55	48.67
APOEL	26 May 2017	28 July 2017	Cypriot First Division	0	0	0	0	0	0	+0	—
APOEL	26 May 2017	28 July 2017	Cypriot Cup	0	0	0	0	0	0	+0	—
APOEL	26 May 2017	28 July 2017	Europe	3	2	0	1	2	1	+1	66.67
APOEL	26 May 2017	28 July 2017	Other (Note: Includes Cypriot Super Cup.)	0	0	0	0	0	0	+0	—
APOEL	26 May 2017	28 July 2017	Total	3	2	0	1	2	1	+1	66.67
Career totals			League	290	126	77	87	462	362	+100	43.45
Career totals			Cup	28	18	1	9	61	31	+30	64.29
Career totals			Europe	34	15	8	11	37	41	−4	44.12
Career totals			Other	11	7	1	3	17	7	+10	63.64
Career totals			Total	363	166	87	110	577	441	+136	45.73

== Personal life ==
His son Gianluca (born in 1990) also played football for Feyenoord, Excelsior Rotterdam, Deltasport Vlaardingen, VV Oude Maas and BVV Barendrecht; the two of them also co-own a Tapasvine bar called La Hermana in Barendrecht.

== Honours ==
Genk

- Belgian Cup: 2012–13
