= Tobias Waisapy =

Dutch footballer

Personal information
- Date of birth: 26 January 1989 (age 37)
- Place of birth: Capelle aan den IJssel, Netherlands
- Height: 1.84 m (6 ft 1/2 in)
- Position: Defender

Youth career
- Feyenoord

Senior career*
Years	Team	Apps	(Gls)
2009–2011	Excelsior	14	(0)
2014–2016	XerxesDZB		
- * Club domestic league appearances and goals

Tobias Waisapy (born 8 January 1989) is a Dutch former professional footballer who played as a defender.

== Career ==
Born in Capelle aan den IJssel, Waisapy began his career as a youth at Feyenoord, and played senior football for Excelsior. In July 2012 he was linked with Go Ahead Eagles. He later played for XerxesDZB.

== Personal life ==
He is of Indonesian descent.
