= Pieter Vink =

Dutch football referee

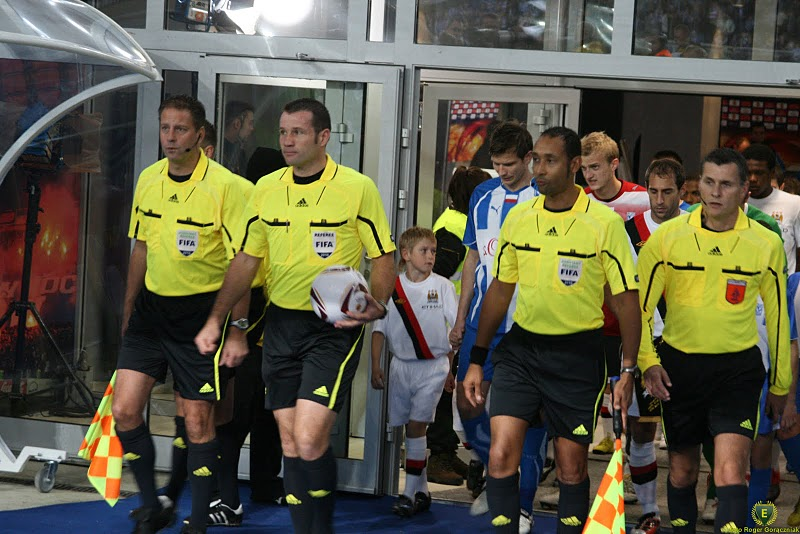
- Pieter Vink and his assistants
- Born: 13 March 1967 (age 59); Noordwijkerhout, South Holland, Netherlands
- Other occupation: Ex-police officer

Domestic
Years	League	Role
1993–1996	Eredivisie C-List	Referee
1996–2001	Eredivisie B-List	Referee
2001–2017	Eredivisie A-List	Referee

International
Years	League	Role
2004–2010	FIFA and UEFA listed	Referee
2007–2010	UEFA Elite listed	Referee

Pieter Vink (Dutch pronunciation: [ˈpitər ˈvɪŋk]; born 13 March 1967) is a former Dutch football referee, who also officiated for FIFA and UEFA. He was the first referee to take charge of a match at the "New Wembley Stadium" in 2007. His other occupation was as a police officer, eventually giving this up to become a full-time referee. His main other hobby is golf.

== Career ==
Vink began refereeing in 1987, and was elected to the Eredivisie C-List in 1993, progressing to the competition's B-List in 1996 and then becoming a referee on the country's A-List in 2001. dec.

Internationally, he has been a FIFA referee since 2004, also debuting as a referee in the UEFA Cup in the same year, and then being appointed to the 2005 UEFA European Under-19 Football Championship Final at Windsor Park, Belfast, on 29 July 2005, when France defeated England 3–1.

He was given the considerable honour of handling the first official match to be played at the newly rebuilt Wembley Stadium on 24 March 2007, a 'friendly' between England Under-21 and Italy Under-21 which finished 3–3.

In 2007, he refereed his first match in the UEFA Champions League, a qualifying tie between Steaua Bucharest of Romania and BATE Borisov of Belarus, having been promoted to UEFA's Elite list in July. He went on to handle three more games in the Group stage of the competition in that year. Vink was referee for the Euro 2008 qualifying match between Scotland and Ukraine on 13 October 2007 at Hampden Park, Glasgow, when the Ukrainians were effectively eliminated after a 3–1 defeat. Subsequently, he took charge of Northern Ireland's 2–1 win over Denmark at Windsor Park, Belfast, on 17 November 2007.

Vink refereed the all-English Champions League quarter final first leg between Arsenal and Liverpool at the Emirates Stadium on 2 April 2008.

=== Euro 2008 ===
On 19 December 2007 it was announced that Vink would head the Dutch team of officials selected for the Euro 2008 competition proper, held in Austria and Switzerland in summer 2008. He refereed the third match of the competition between hosts Austria and Croatia.
