= Rob van Dijk =

Dutch footballer (born 1969)

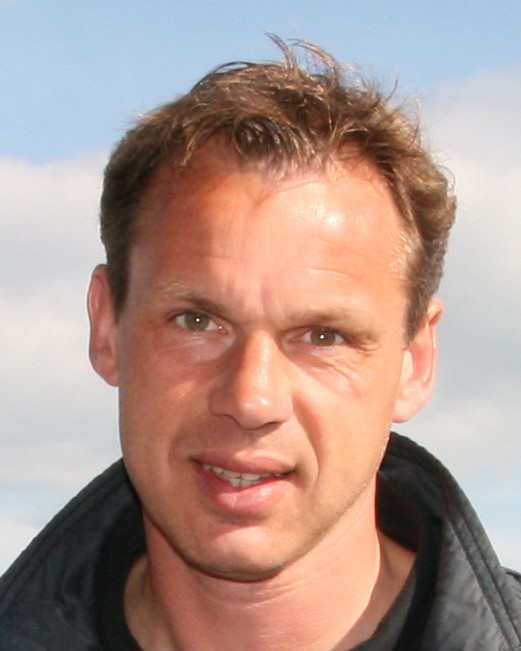

Personal information
- Full name: Robert van Dijk
- Date of birth: 15 January 1969 (age 57)
- Place of birth: Voorhout, Netherlands
- Height: 1.91 m (6 ft 3 in)
- Position: Goalkeeper

Youth career
- Foreholte
- vv Noordwijk

Senior career*
Years	Team	Apps	(Gls)
1992–1996	Feyenoord	4	(0)
1996–2003	RKC	214	(0)
2003–2004	PSV	1	(0)
2004–2005	De Graafschap	14	(0)
2005–2007	RKC	53	(0)
2007–2008	Heerenveen	15	(0)
2008–2011	Feyenoord	47	(0)
2011–2012	Utrecht	18	(0)
Total		364	(0)
- * Club domestic league appearances and goals

Robert van Dijk (born 15 January 1969) is a Dutch retired footballer who played as a goalkeeper.

Over the course of exactly 20 seasons as a professional, he appeared in 364 Eredivisie games, mainly with RKC (nine years) and Feyenoord (seven). He retired at the age of 43.

== Early life ==
Van Dijk was born in Voorhout, South Holland. In his youth, he never thought he would make it to become a professional footballer. He only enjoyed playing football with his friends on amateur level, while his dream was to become a physical education teacher.

== Club career ==
=== Youth ===
Van Dijk started his career at local team Foreholte, as a meritorious sweeper, who 'roamed' around the back line. Goalkeeper in his team was two-year younger Edwin van der Sar: "I was the last man to kick all the balls away, while Edwin did the rest. It was a nice time. I still talk to him occasionally."

At the age of 19, van Dijk started playing futsal with some friends in a recreational team. As someone had to be the goalkeeper, he made the sacrifice, which went well above expectation. When van der Sar left Foreholte for vv Noordwijk, van Dijk switched his position on the field and became the goalkeeper of the club's reserves, being promoted to the first team after one season.

Quickly various professional sides were interested in the talented goalkeeper, and van Dijk had a short trial at Ajax Amsterdam, who were in need of a third goalkeeper. However, Ajax decided to pick his former teammate van der Sar, while van Dijk went on to have a short spell at vv Noordwijk as van der Sar's successor, but soon grabbed the chance to become reserve goalkeeper at Feyenoord.

=== Professionals ===
Only three years after the playing position switch, van Dijk made his goalkeeping debut in Feyenoord's first team. On 5 December 1992, he replaced Dean Gorré in the 59th minute of the first division match against Vitesse Arnhem (2–2), after starting keeper Ed de Goey was sent off after a foul in the penalty area. Phillip Cocu scored the penalty kick and became the first player to score against van Dijk on professional level. Van Dijk had his highlight two years after his debut: on 30 November 1994, he replaced the injured de Goey in the cup contest against Willem II (1–1 aet), performing well enough to earn Man of the match accolades, after a penalty shootout.

After four seasons playing only four league matches for Feyenoord, van Dijk decided to request a transfer: "De Goey wasn't going to leave. That was pretty much it. I've been a substitute behind Ed for four years. At the moment I had the chance, it didn't look like De Goey would leave any time soon. At RKC Waalwijk I could become the first goalkeeper."

Van Dijk stayed at RKC Waalwijk for seven consecutive seasons, playing a total of 214 Eredivisie matches for the club. Just before the final fixture of 2002–03, it was announced the goalkeeper would strengthen PSV Eindhoven's squad during the next season.

At PSV, van Dijk signed a two-year deal with the reigning champions of the Netherlands, backing up experienced Ronald Waterreus for the entire campaign, with only one appearance to his credit: on 16 May 2004, he was placed in goal when PSV traveled to AZ and recorded a 2–4 win. For 2004–05, he would become fourth-choice, behind Heurelho Gomes, Edwin Zoetebier and Nathan Coe.

Van Dijk had one year left of his contract in Eindhoven, but was able to leave the club on a free transfer by mutual agreement. On 9 July 2004, he left the club and signed with De Graafschap.

Van Dijk signed for two years at De Graafschap, but missed the majority of his first year, due to a knee injury; the full recovery took months, as the doctors discovered severe cartilage wear. De Graafschap finished on the 17th place and relegated to the second level.

Subsequently, van Dijk returned to RKC in the summer of 2005, becoming first choice and not missing one single match during his first season. However, he had a less successful season 2006–07 as, due to bad results, RKC Waalwijk coach Adrie Koster was fired on 27 November 2006. The new coach, Mark Wotte, started experimenting with reserve goalkeeper Jurgen Wevers, who eventually became first-choice.

On 30 January 2007, SC Heerenveen announced the arrival of van Dijk as their new reserve, behind Brian Vandenbussche. He stayed at the club for two years, amassing a total of 15 first division games.

On 1 September 2008, 39-year-old van Dijk returned to Feyenoord. He was promoted to starter in his second year, following the retirement of another veteran, Henk Timmer.

On 24 October 2010, 41-year-old van Dijk was in goal as Feyenoord lost 0–10 at former team PSV, the club's heaviest defeat ever. He retired from football at the end of the season, having appeared 18 times in the league; on 9 August 2011, however, it was announced that the player had signed a one-year contract with FC Utrecht, as Michel Vorm signed for Swansea City and Roberto Fernández was out for three months with an injury.

== Honours ==
Feyenoord

- Eredivisie: 1992–93
- KNVB Cup: 1993–94, 1994–95

== Club statistics ==
Club performance			League		Cup		Continental		Total	
Season	Club	League	Apps	Goals	Apps	Goals	Apps	Goals	Apps	Goals
Netherlands			League		KNVB Cup		Europe		Total	
1992–93	Feyenoord	Eredivisie	2	0	0	0	0	0	2	0
1993–94	Feyenoord	Eredivisie	0	0	0	0	0	0	0	0
1994–95	Feyenoord	Eredivisie	2	0	0	0	0	0	2	0
1995–96	Feyenoord	Eredivisie	0	0	0	0	0	0	0	0
1996–97	RKC	Eredivisie	33	0	0	0	0	0	33	0
1997–98	RKC	Eredivisie	34	0	0	0	0	0	34	0
1998–99	RKC	Eredivisie	32	0	0	0	0	0	32	0
1999–00	RKC	Eredivisie	34	0	0	0	0	0	34	0
2000–01	RKC	Eredivisie	32	0	0	0	0	0	32	0
2001–02	RKC	Eredivisie	24	0	0	0	0	0	24	0
2002–03	RKC	Eredivisie	23	0	0	0	0	0	23	0
2003–04	PSV	Eredivisie	1	0	0	0	0	0	1	0
2004–05	De Graafschap	Eredivisie	14	0	0	0	0	0	14	0
2005–06	RKC	Eredivisie	34	0	0	0	0	0	34	0
2006–07	RKC	Eredivisie	19	0	0	0	0	0	19	0
2006–07	Heerenveen	Eredivisie	0	0	0	0	0	0	0	0
2007–08	Heerenveen	Eredivisie	15	0	0	0	0	0	15	0
2008–09	Heerenveen	Eredivisie	0	0	0	0	0	0	0	0
2008–09	Feyenoord	Eredivisie	6	0	0	0	0	0	6	0
2009–10	Feyenoord	Eredivisie	23	0	0	0	0	0	23	0
2010–11	Feyenoord	Eredivisie	18	0	0	0	0	0	18	0
2011–12	Utrecht	Eredivisie	18	0	0	0	0	0	18	0
Total	Netherlands		364	0	0	0	0	0	364	0
Career total			364	0	0	0	0	0	364	0
