= 2008–09 Feyenoord season =

Feyenoord
2008–09 season
- Chairman: Dick van Well
- Manager: Gertjan Verbeek (until 14 January 2009); Leon Vlemmings (caretaker; from 14 January 2009)
- Stadium: De Kuip
- Eredivisie: 7th
- Johan Cruyff Shield: Runner-up
- KNVB Cup: Round of 16
- UEFA Cup: Group stage
- Top goalscorer: League: Roy Makaay (16); All: Roy Makaay (20)
- Highest home attendance: 46,000 Feyenoord–Vitesse
- Lowest home attendance: 13,000 Feyenoord–CSKA Moscow
- Average home league attendance: 43,750 Eredivisie; 20,100 KNVB Cup; 19,333 UEFA cup
- Biggest win: Feyenoord 5–0 Volendam
- Biggest defeat: Feyenoord 0–4 NAC
Home colours	Away colours	Third colours

The 2008–09 season was Feyenoord, in Dutch Eredivisie. the first season under new coach Gertjan Verbeek. On 14 January 2009, the bigger part of the players group declared they did not have any confidence in Gertjan Verbeek. Although the board and the supporters completely backed up Verbeek, the choice was made to sack the trainer because of financial considerations. The rest of the season Leon Vlemmings, who was Verbeek's assistant from the start of the season, was the manager.

== Competitions ==
=== Overall ===
Competition	Started round	Final position / round	First match	Last match
Eredivisie	—	7th	9 August 2008	10 May 2009
KNVB Cup	2nd round	Round of 16	24 September 2008	20 January 2009
Johan Cruyff Shield	Final	Runner-up	23 August 2008	
UEFA Cup	1st Round	Group stage	18 September 2008	17 December 2008
Playoff UEFA Cup	1/2 final	1/2 final	16 May 2009	24 May 2009

Source: Competitions

=== Eredivisie ===
==== League table ====
Pos	Team	Pld	W	D	L	GF	GA	GD	Pts	Qualification or relegation
5	Heerenveen	34	17	9	8	66	57	+9	60	Qualification to Europa League play-off round (Note: Heerenveen qualified for the play-off round of the UEFA Europa League 2009–10 by winning the 2008–09 KNVB Cup.)
6	Groningen	34	17	5	12	53	36	+17	56	Qualification to European competition play-offs
7	Feyenoord	34	12	9	13	54	46	+8	45	Qualification to European competition play-offs
8	NAC Breda (O)	34	13	6	15	44	54	−10	45	Qualification to European competition play-offs
9	Utrecht	34	11	11	12	41	44	−3	44	Qualification to European competition play-offs

Source: ESPN Eredivisie Table
Rules for classification: 1) points; 2) goal difference; 3) number of goals scored.
(O) Play-off winners

==== Results summary ====
Overall								Home						Away					
Pld	W	D	L	GF	GA	GD	Pts	W	D	L	GF	GA	GD	W	D	L	GF	GA	GD
34	12	9	13	54	46	+8	45	8	5	4	34	21	+13	4	4	9	20	25	−5

Source: Matches

==== Matches ====
31 August 2008 1	Heracles	3–1	Feyenoord	Almelo
14:30 CEST (UTC+02:00)	Douglas 38'; Dost (yellow card) 49'; Klavan 60'; Bridji 90'	Report	Bahia 1', (yellow card) 59'; De Guzmán (red card) 30'; Bruins (yellow card) 64'	Stadium: Polman Stadion; Attendance: 8,500; Referee: Roelof Luinge

13 September 2008 2	Feyenoord	5–0	Volendam	Rotterdam
14:30 CEST (UTC+02:00)	Tomasson 14' (pen.), 30' (pen.); De Cler (yellow card) 56'; Biseswar 74', 82'; Mols 90+2'	Report	Boots (yellow card) 14'; Maynard (yellow card) 29'	Stadium: De Kuip; Attendance: 42,500; Referee: Ruud Bossen

21 September 2008 3	Feyenoord	2–2	Ajax	Rotterdam
12:30 CEST (UTC+02:00)	Biseswar (yellow card) 2'; De Cler (yellow card) 39'; Timmer (yellow card) 42'; Tomasson 50', 84' (pen.); Hofland (yellow card) 69'; Bruins (yellow card) 88'	Report	Van der Wiel (yellow card) 28'; Sarpong 39', (yellow card) 45'; Suárez (yellow card) 40'; Huntelaar 70'; Emanuelson (yellow card) 85'	Stadium: De Kuip; Attendance: 42,000; Referee: Eric Braamhaar

28 September 2008 4	Groningen	3–1	Feyenoord	Groningen
14:30 CEST (UTC+02:00)	Lovre (yellow card) 8'; De Roover 21'; Van de Laak (yellow card) 33'; Berg (yellow card) 49', (goal) 81', 90'	Report	Hofland (red card) 10'; Bahia (yellow card) 41', (goal) 88'; Wijnaldum (yellow card) 55'	Stadium: Euroborg; Attendance: 22,329; Referee: Kevin Blom

5 October 2008 5	Feyenoord	0–2	NEC	Rotterdam
14:30 CEST (UTC+02:00)	El Ahmadi (yellow card) 14'; Greene (yellow card) 63'	Report	Zomer (yellow card) 45'; Janssen 49'; Ntibazonkiza 56', (yellow card) 59'	Stadium: De Kuip; Attendance: 44,000; Referee: Björn Kuipers

19 October 2008 6	Willem II	1–0	Feyenoord	Tilburg
14:30 CEST (UTC+02:00)	Demouge 23', (yellow card) 41'	Report		Stadium: Koning Willem II Stadion; Attendance: 13,750; Referee: Reinold Wiedemeijer

26 October 2008 7	Feyenoord	2–2	Heerenveen	Rotterdam
16:30 CEST (UTC+02:00)	Van Bronckhorst (yellow card) 11'; Bahia (yellow card) 14'; Fer (yellow card) 66'; Makaay 69'; Mols 90'	Report	Paulo Henrique 35'; Väyrynen (yellow card) 37'; Pranjić 48'; Vandenbussche (yellow card) 66'; Breuer (yellow card) 71'	Stadium: De Kuip; Attendance: 45,500; Referee: Roelof Luinge

29 October 2008 8	Sparta Rotterdam	2–1	Feyenoord	Rotterdam
20:00 CEST (UTC+02:00)	Vermes (yellow card) 31'; Slot 42'; Knol (yellow card) 71'; Slijngard (yellow card) 73'; Poepon 87'	Report	Fer 40'; Greene (yellow card) 45'	Stadium: Het Kasteel; Attendance: 10,894; Referee: Pieter Vink

2 November 2008 9	Roda JC	0–4	Feyenoord	Kerkrade
12:30 CEST (UTC+02:00)	Kah (yellow card) 81'	Report	Hofland (yellow card) 50'; Wijnaldum 53'; Fer 57'; Makaay 67'; Biseswar 70'	Stadium: Parkstad Limburg; Attendance: 16,095; Referee: Kevin Blom

9 November 2008 10	Feyenoord	5–2	Utrecht	Rotterdam
14:30 CEST (UTC+02:00)	Van Bronckhorst 5', (yellow card) 85'; Biseswar 27', 31'; El Ahmadi (yellow card) 66', (goal) 89'; Hofland (yellow card) 78'; Makaay 90'	Report	Schut 33'; Neșu 57'; Cornelisse (yellow card) 58'; Van Dijk (yellow card) 72'	Stadium: De Kuip; Attendance: 43,000; Referee: Eric Braamhaar

23 November 2008 11	Twente	1–1	Feyenoord	Enschede
14:30 CEST (UTC+02:00)	Nkufo 13' (pen.); Douglas (yellow card) 78'	Report	Tiendalli (yellow card) 12'; Makaay 53' (pen.); Van Bronckhorst (yellow card) 61'; El Ahmadi (yellow card) 75'	Stadium: De Grolsch Veste; Attendance: 23,028; Referee: Ruud Bossen

30 November 2008 12	Feyenoord	3–1	ADO Den Haag	Rotterdam
12:30 CEST (UTC+02:00)	Derijck (yellow card) 8'; Makaay 16'; Fer 43'; Bruins 54'	Report	Knopper 10', (yellow card) 12'; Tillema (yellow card) 32'; Caracciolo (yellow card) 60'	Stadium: De Kuip; Attendance: 41,500; Referee: Bas Nijhuis

7 December 2008 13	Vitesse	1–1	Feyenoord	Arnhem
12:30 CEST (UTC+02:00)	Verhaegh 77'	Report	Makaay 3'	Stadium: GelreDome; Attendance: 17,345; Referee: Kevin Blom

14 December 2008 14	Feyenoord	1–3	De Graafschap	Rotterdam
14:30 CEST (UTC+02:00)	Bahia (yellow card) 56'; Hofland 79'	Report	Oost 11' (yellow card) 72'; Den Ouden 51', 69'	Stadium: De Kuip; Attendance: 44,500; Referee: Pol van Boekel

20 December 2008 15	Feyenoord	0–1	AZ	Rotterdam
20:45 CEST (UTC+02:00)	El Ahmadi (yellow card) 76'	Report	De Zeeuw (yellow card) 36'; Ari 56'	Stadium: De Kuip; Attendance: 45,500; Referee: Pieter Vink

10 January 2009 16	PSV	1–0	Feyenoord	Eindhoven
14:30 CEST (UTC+02:00)	Afellay 78'	Report	Tiendalli (yellow card) 19'; El Ahmadi (yellow card) 50'; Bruins (yellow card) 62'; Lucius (yellow card) 83'; Bahia (yellow card) 90'	Stadium: Philips Stadion; Attendance: 35,000; Referee: Eric Braamhaar

13 January 2009 17	Feyenoord	3–1	NAC Breda	Rotterdam
14:30 CEST (UTC+02:00)	Biseswar 33'; Fer 44', 63'; Wattamaleo (yellow card) 88'	Report	De Graaf (yellow card) 32'; Amoah 86'; Zwaanswijk (yellow card) 88'	Stadium: De Kuip; Attendance: 41,500; Referee: Jack van Hulten

16 January 2009 18	Heerenveen	3–1	Feyenoord	Heerenveen
20:45 CEST (UTC+02:00)	Nielsen 4'; Väyrynen (yellow card) 34'; Pranjić 43'; Smárason 71'	Report	Makaay 38'	Stadium: Abe Lenstra Stadion; Attendance: 26,100; Referee: Bas Nijhuis

24 January 2009 19	Feyenoord	1–1	Willem II	Rotterdam
20:45 CEST (UTC+02:00)	De Cler (yellow card) 44'; Slory 90'	Report	Janse 51'; Zijler (yellow card) 53'; Boutahar (yellow card) 60'	Stadium: De Kuip; Attendance: 44,250; Referee: Roelof Luinge

1 February 2009 20	NEC	1–0	Feyenoord	Nijmegen
14:30 CEST (UTC+02:00)	Sibum (yellow card) 53'; Davids (yellow card) 80'; Koenders 90'	Report	Slory (yellow card) 79'	Stadium: De Goffert; Attendance: 12,500; Referee: Eric Braamhaar

4 February 2009 21	Feyenoord	1–0	Sparta Rotterdam	Rotterdam
20:00 CEST (UTC+02:00)	Biseswar 18'; Tiendalli (yellow card) 81'	Report	Promes (yellow card) 5'; Strootman (yellow card) 18'; Vermes (yellow card) 51'; Slijngard (yellow card) 64'; Godee (yellow card) 65'	Stadium: De Kuip; Attendance: 45,000; Referee: Bas Nijhuis

8 February 2009 22	Feyenoord	0–0	Groningen	Rotterdam
14:30 CEST (UTC+02:00)	Slory (yellow card) 38'; Nieveld (red card) 42'; Hofland (yellow card) 85'	Report		Stadium: De Kuip; Attendance: 43,000; Referee: Björn Kuipers

15 February 2009 23	Ajax	2–0	Feyenoord	Amsterdam
12:30 CEST (UTC+02:00)	Vermaelen 51'; Leonardo (yellow card) 59'; Emanuelson 90'	Report	Fer (yellow card) 22'; Bahia (yellow card) 26'; Tiendalli (red card) 82'; Lucius (yellow card) 50'	Stadium: Amsterdam Arena; Attendance: 50,136; Referee: Pieter Vink

22 February 2009 24	De Graafschap	0–2	Feyenoord	Doetinchem
14:30 CEST (UTC+02:00)	Meijer (yellow card) 23'	Report	El Ahmadi 54'; Van Bronckhorst (yellow card) 66'; Tomasson 90'	Stadium: De Vijverberg; Attendance: 12,600; Referee: Kevin Blom

1 March 2009 25	Feyenoord	2–2	Vitesse	Rotterdam
14:30 CEST (UTC+02:00)	Wijnaldum 41'; Fer (yellow card) 52'; Makaay 72'	Report	Hofs 17'; Sansoni (yellow card) 36'; Velthuizen (yellow card) 52'; Stevanović (yellow card) 39', (goal) 60'	Stadium: De Kuip; Attendance: 46,000; Referee: Richard Liesveld

8 March 2009 26	NAC Breda	1–2	Feyenoord	Breda
14:30 CEST (UTC+02:00)	Gorter 42' (pen.); Penders (yellow card) 68'; Van der Leegte (yellow card) 87'; Loran (yellow card) 88'	Report	Leerdam (yellow card) 42'; Wijnaldum 50'; Tomasson 82', (yellow card) 86'; Pattinama (yellow card) 88'	Stadium: Rat Verlegh; Attendance: 17,254; Referee: Reinold Wiedemeijer

15 March 2009 27	Feyenoord	1–0	PSV	Rotterdam
12:30 CEST (UTC+02:00)	Van Bronckhorst (yellow card) 34'; Fer 73'; Wijnaldum (yellow card) 90'	Report	Lazović (yellow card) 63'	Stadium: De Kuip; Attendance: 42,500; Referee: Kevin Blom

22 March 2009 28	AZ	0–0	Feyenoord	Alkmaar
14:30 CEST (UTC+02:00)		Report	El Ahmadi (yellow card) 90'	Stadium: DSB-Stadion; Attendance: 17,067; Referee: Roelof Luinge

5 April 2009 29	Volendam	2–1	Feyenoord	Volendam
14:30 CEST (UTC+02:00)	Van Dijk 57', 82'; De Wit (yellow card) 78'	Report	Makaay 10'; Fer (yellow card) 74'; Bahia (yellow card) 89'	Stadium: Kras Stadion; Attendance: 6,002; Referee: Bas Nijhuis

12 April 2009 30	Feyenoord	5–1	Heracles	Rotterdam
14:30 CEST (UTC+02:00)	Makaay 3', 23', 59' (pen.); Fer (yellow card) 43'; Landzaat 63'; Leerdam 68'; Slory (yellow card) 78'	Report	Dost 34'; De Vries (yellow card) 35'; Looms (yellow card) 38'; Van den Bergh (yellow card) 55'; Maertens (yellow card) 59'; Boakye (yellow card) 75'	Stadium: De Kuip; Attendance: 45,000; Referee: Tom van Sichem

18 April 2009 31	Feyenoord	1–0	Twente	Rotterdam
20:45 CEST (UTC+02:00)	Leerdam (yellow card) 19'; Tomasson (yellow card) 70'; Makaay 77' (pen.); Van Bronckhorst (red card) 90'	Report	Perez (yellow card) 66'; Brama (yellow card) 75'; Douglas (red card) 76'; Tioté (red card) 85'	Stadium: De Kuip; Attendance: 45,000; Referee: Reinold Wiedemeijer

26 April 2009 32	ADO Den Haag	2–3	Feyenoord	’s-Gravenhage
12:30 CEST (UTC+02:00)	Tillema (yellow card) 25'; Hoogendorp (yellow card) 34'; Derijck 62'; Knopper 81'	Report	Tiendalli (yellow card) 23'; Tomasson 64', 74'; Landzaat (yellow card) 79'; Makaay 82'	Stadium: ADO Den Haag Stadion; Attendance: 14,993; Referee: Bas Nijhuis

3 May 2009 33	Utrecht	2–2	Feyenoord	Utrecht
14:30 CEST (UTC+02:00)	Neșu (yellow card) 9'; Caluwé 14'; Keller 65'	Report	Leerdam (yellow card) 11'; Tomasson 25'; Fer (yellow card) 41'; De Cler (yellow card) 69'; Wijnaldum 73'; Biseswar (yellow card) 77'	Stadium: Stadion Galgenwaard; Attendance: 23,500; Referee: Roelof Luinge

10 May 2009 34	Feyenoord	2–3	Roda JC	Rotterdam
14:30 CEST (UTC+02:00)	Tiendalli (red card) 20'; Makaay 56', 75' (pen.); Wijnaldum (yellow card) 77'; Bahia (yellow card) 80'; Hofland (red card) 83'; Van Bronckhorst (yellow card) 86'	Report	Cissé 14' (yellow card) 90'; Meeuwis 20' (pen.), (yellow card) 74'; Lachambre (yellow card) 23'; Hadouir 70'; Kah (yellow card) 74'	Stadium: De Kuip; Attendance: 48,000; Referee: Kevin Blom

=== UEFA Cup Playoff ===
16 May 2009 1/2 final	NAC Breda	3–2	Feyenoord	Breda
19:30 CEST (UTC+02:00)	Penders 56'; Gorter 60' (pen.); Lurling (yellow card) 79'; Amoah 83'; Van der Leegte (red card) 86'	Report	Biseswar (yellow card) 11'; Makaay 69' (pen.); Tomasson 87' (pen.)	Stadium: Rat Verlegh Stadion; Attendance: 12,548; Referee: Roelof Luinge

21 May 2009 1/2 final	Feyenoord	0–4	NAC Breda	Rotterdam
14:30 CEST (UTC+02:00)	Bahia (yellow card) 17'	Report	Penders 31'; Boukhari (yellow card) 41'; Reuser 53'; Kwakman 85'; Kolkka 87'	Stadium: De Kuip; Attendance: 22,000; Referee: Eric Braamhaar

=== Johan Cruyff Shield ===
23 August 2008 Final	Feyenoord	0–2	PSV	Amsterdam
		Report	55' Lazović; 66' Marcellis	Stadium: Amsterdam Arena; Attendance: 37,000; Referee: Kevin Blom

=== KNVB Cup ===
24 September 2008 Round of 64	Feyenoord	3–0 (a.e.t.)	TOP Oss	Rotterdam
20:45 CEST (UTC+02:00)	Makaay 92'; Janota 109', 118'	Report		Stadium: De Kuip; Attendance: 10,000; Referee: Jack van Hulten

4 December 2008 Round of 32	HHC Hardenberg	1–5	Feyenoord	Emmen
20:45 CEST (UTC+02:00)	Tieltjes 24'	Report	Pedro 31', 52'; Makaay 51', 76'; Hofland 85'	Stadium: Unive Stadion; Attendance: 8,500; Referee: Danny Makkelie

20 January 2009 Round of 16	Feyenoord	0–3	Heerenveen	Rotterdam
20:45 CEST (UTC+02:00)	Bahia (yellow card) 46'	Report	Elm 37', 73'; Breuer (yellow card) 52'; Beerens 82'	Stadium: De Kuip; Attendance: 22,700; Referee: Pieter Vink

=== UEFA Cup ===
18 September 2008 1st round	Feyenoord	0–1	(Sweden) Kalmar FF	Rotterdam
19:00 CEST (UTC+02:00)		Report	Elm 71'	Stadium: De Kuip; Attendance: 22,000; Referee: Darko Čeferin (Slovenia)

2 October 2008 1st round	Kalmar FF (Sweden)	1–2	Feyenoord	Borås
18:30 CEST (UTC+02:00)	Johansson 47'; Nouri (yellow card) 54'; R. Elm (yellow card) 90+1'	Report	Wijnaldum 18'; Nouri 52' (o.g.); Van Bronckhorst (yellow card) 90+3'	Stadium: Borås Arena; Attendance: 9,000; Referee: Thorsten Kinhöfer (Germany)

23 October 2008 Group Stage Group H	Nancy (France)	3–0	Feyenoord	Nancy
20:45 CEST (UTC+02:00)	Féret (yellow card) 18', (goal) 53'; Zerka 47'; Hélder Maurílio 84'	Report	Hofland (yellow card) 15'; Greene (yellow card) 63'	Stadium: Stade Marcel Picot; Attendance: 11,512; Referee: Matteo Trefoloni (Italy)

6 November 2008 Group Stage Group H	Feyenoord	1–3	(Russia) CSKA Moscow	Rotterdam
19:30 CEST (UTC+02:00)	Van Bronckhorst 29'; Bahia (yellow card) 44'; De Cler (yellow card) 90+2'	Report	Van Bronckhorst 14' (o.g.); Vágner Love 40', 81'; Aldonin (red card) 82'; Rahimić (yellow card) 90+3'	Stadium: De Kuip; Attendance: 13,000; Referee: Svein Oddvar Moen (Norway)

27 November 2008 Group Stage Group H	Deportivo La Coruña (Spain)	3–0	Feyenoord	A Coruña
21:00 CEST (UTC+02:00)	Lopo 30'; Guardado (yellow card) 37', (goal) 51'; Hofland 50' (o.g.); Tomás (yellow card) 63'	Report		Stadium: Estadio Municipal de Riazor; Attendance: 20,000; Referee: Martin Ingvarsson (Sweden)

11 December 2008 Group Stage Group H	Feyenoord	0–1	(Poland) Lech Poznań	Rotterdam
20:45 CEST (UTC+02:00)	Lucius (yellow card) 18'; Bahia (yellow card) 61'	Report	Đurđević 27', (yellow card) 28'; Peszko (yellow card) 31'	Stadium: De Kuip; Attendance: 23,000; Referee: Paolo Dondarini (Italy)

=== Friendlies ===
12 July 2008	VV Oirschot Vooruit	1–9	Feyenoord	Oirschot
	Van der Wal 31'		De Guzmán 14'; Landzaat 19'; Bruins 24', 34'; Biseswar 52', 74', 80'; Hofs 55'; Janota 70'	Stadium: Sportpark Moorland; Attendance: 3,500; Referee: Unknown

15 July 2008	Groot Goes	1–9	Feyenoord	Kloetinge
	Weijers 38'		El Ahmadi 22'; Bruins 25'; Pedro 56', 69', 87'; Leerdam 60', 73'; Janota 76', 82'	Stadium: Wesselopark; Attendance: Unknown; Referee: Unknown

17 July 2008	SV VELO Wateringen	1–12	Feyenoord	Wateringen
	Schooneman 37'		Mols 15'; Erasmus 20', 44'; Janota 33'; Makaay 47'; Tomasson 54', 69', 77'; Wijnaldum 60', 72'; Bruins 65', 78'	Stadium: Sportcomplex VELO; Attendance: Unknown; Referee: Dick Jol

22 July 2008	Feyenoord	0–2	(Spain) Mallorca	Wörgl
	Landzaat (penalty missed) 20'		Arango 30', 55'	Stadium: Sportstadion Wörgl; Attendance: Unknown; Referee: Unknown

24 July 2008	Regionaalelftal Oberliga (Austria)	0–12	Feyenoord	Wörgl
			Slory 2', 24'; Fer 13', 27'; Landzaat 16'; Greene 20'; Bahia 41'; Tomasson 57', 81'; Janota 69', 87'; Manteiga 84'	Stadium: Sportstadion Wörgl; Attendance: Unknown; Referee: Unknown

26 July 2008	Dordrecht	1–1	Feyenoord	Dordrecht
	Ribeiro 69'		Derveld 38' (o.g.)	Stadium: GN Bouw Stadion; Attendance: Unknown; Referee: Danny Makkelie

1 August 2008	Feyenoord	1–2	(Germany) Borussia Dortmund	Rotterdam
	Wijnaldum 41'		Błaszczykowski 5'; Hille 78'	Stadium: De Kuip; Attendance: Unknown; Referee: Pieter Vink

3 August 2008	Feyenoord	1–3	(Scotland) Celtic	Rotterdam
	Fer 57'		Samaras 13'; Vennegoor of Hesselink 16', 40'	Stadium: De Kuip; Attendance: Unknown; Referee: Unknown

8 August 2008	Excelsior Maassluis	0–7	Feyenoord	Maassluis
			Biseswar 16', 35'; Janota 34'; Fer 48'; Landzaat 55'; Vlaar 67'; Bruins 72'	Stadium: Sportpark Dijkpolder; Attendance: Unknown; Referee: Unknown

9 August 2008	Benfica (Portugal)	1–0	Feyenoord	Lisbon
	Cardozo 69'			Stadium: Estádio da Luz; Attendance: Unknown; Referee: Pedro Henriques

16 August 2008	Konyaspor (Turkey)	0–0	Feyenoord	Konya
				Stadium: Konya Atatürk Stadium; Attendance: Unknown; Referee: Ahmed Gökhan Bal

19 August 2008	BVV Barendrecht	2–1	Feyenoord	Barendrecht
	Van Zanten 49'; Koremans 90'		Ramsteijn 68'	Stadium: Sportpark De Bongerd; Attendance: Unknown; Referee: Unknown

27 June 2009	Sportclub Feyenoord	0–5	Feyenoord	Rotterdam
			Luigi Bruins 45', 82'; Pattinama 47'; Eli 51' (o.g.); De Cler 86'	Stadium: Sportcomplex Varkenoord; Attendance: Unknown; Referee: Unknown

30 June 2009	Wit-Rood-Wit	1–10	Feyenoord	Brielle
	Hessel 62'		Makaay 6'; Luigi Bruins 30'; Slory 31'; Tomasson 32'; Fernández 44'; Hofs 52'; Landzaat 60', 68' (pen.); Pattinama 72', 77' (pen.)	Stadium: Sportcomplex Nieuw-Meeuwenoord; Attendance: Unknown; Referee: Jan Wegereef

== Player details ==
No.	Pos	Nat	Player	Total		Eredivisie		KNVB Cup		Super Cup		UEFA Cup	
No.	Pos	Nat	Player	Apps	Goals	Apps	Goals	Apps	Goals	Apps	Goals	Apps	Goals
1	GK	(Netherlands) NED	Henk Timmer	39	0	30	0	3	0	1	0	5	0
2	DF	(Netherlands) NED	Theo Lucius	22	0	18	0	1	0	0	0	3	0
3	DF	(Netherlands) NED	Kevin Hofland	28	2	20	1	3	1	0	0	5	0
4	DF	(Brazil) BRA	André Bahia	40	2	30	2	3	0	1	0	6	0
5	DF	(Netherlands) NED	Tim de Cler	27	0	19	0	2	0	1	0	5	0
6	MF	(Morocco) MAR	Karim El Ahmadi	29	2	22	2	2	0	0	0	5	0
7	MF	(Netherlands) NED	Denny Landzaat	8	1	7	1	0	0	1	0	0	0
8	MF	(Netherlands) NED	Giovanni van Bronckhorst	36	2	27	1	3	0	1	0	5	1
9	FW	(Netherlands) NED	Roy Makaay	40	19	31	16	3	3	0	0	6	0
10	MF	(Netherlands) NED	Luigi Bruins	30	1	22	1	3	0	1	0	4	0
11	FW	(Denmark) DEN	Jon Dahl Tomasson	14	9	13	9	0	0	0	0	1	0
14	FW	(Netherlands) NED	Michael Mols	25	2	18	2	3	0	1	0	3	0
15	FW	(South Africa) RSA	Kermit Erasmus	6	0	4	0	0	0	0	0	2	0
16	GK	(Brazil) BRA	Darley	0	0	0	0	0	0	0	0	0	0
17	MF	(Brazil) BRA	Manteiga	0	0	0	0	0	0	0	0	0	0
18	DF	(Netherlands) NED	Serginho Greene	14	0	9	0	1	0	1	0	3	0
20	DF	(Netherlands) NED	Ron Vlaar	0	0	0	0	0	0	0	0	0	0
22	FW	(Netherlands) NED	Andwelé Slory	21	1	20	1	0	0	0	0	1	0
23	MF	(Netherlands) NED	Danny Buijs	1	0	1	0	0	0	0	0	0	0
24	FW	(Netherlands) NED	Luis Pedro	10	2	9	0	1	2	0	0	0	0
25	MF	(Netherlands) NED	Giorginio Wijnaldum	43	5	33	4	3	0	1	0	6	1
26	MF	(Poland) POL	Michal Janota	10	2	6	0	2	2	1	0	1	0
27	DF	(Netherlands) NED	Kaj Ramsteijn	0	0	0	0	0	0	0	0	0	0
28	MF	(Netherlands) NED	Leroy Fer	40	6	32	6	2	0	0	0	6	0
29	FW	(Netherlands) NED	Tim Vincken	0	0	0	0	0	0	0	0	0	0
30	FW	(Netherlands) NED	Nicky Hofs	1	0	0	0	0	0	1	0	0	0
31	DF	(Netherlands) NED	Dwight Tiendalli	27	0	22	0	2	0	0	0	3	0
32	GK	(Netherlands) NED	Rob van Dijk	7	0	6	0	0	0	0	0	1	0
33	MF	(Netherlands) NED	Jonathan de Guzmán	3	0	2	0	0	0	0	0	1	0
34	FW	(Netherlands) NED	Mitchell Schet	4	0	2	0	1	0	1	0	0	0
35	DF	(Netherlands) NED	Norichio Nieveld	3	0	3	0	0	0	0	0	0	0
36	MF	(Netherlands) NED	Kevin Wattamaleo	5	0	4	0	0	0	0	0	1	0
37	FW	(Netherlands) NED	Diego Biseswar	35	7	28	7	2	0	1	0	4	0
38	MF	(Netherlands) NED	Kelvin Leerdam	19	1	16	1	1	0	0	0	2	0
40	DF	(Belgium) BEL	Timothy Derijck	5	0	4	0	0	0	0	0	1	0
42	MF	(Netherlands) NED	Glenn Kobussen	1	0	1	0	0	0	0	0	0	0
48	FW	(Netherlands) NED	Jordao Pattinama	3	0	3	0	0	0	0	0	0	0

- Source: voetbal.com

== Transfers ==
In: Note: Flags indicate national team as defined under FIFA eligibility rules; some limited exceptions apply. Players may hold more than one non-FIFA nationality.

No.	Pos.	Nation	Player
—	FW	RSA	Kermit Erasmus (from (South Africa) SuperSport United)
—	MF	MAR	Karim El Ahmadi (from (Netherlands) Twente)
—	FW	DEN	Jon Dahl Tomasson (from (Spain) Villarreal)
—	MF	BRA	Manteiga (from (Brazil) Gama)

Out: Note: Flags indicate national team as defined under FIFA eligibility rules; some limited exceptions apply. Players may hold more than one non-FIFA nationality.

No.	Pos.	Nation	Player
—	DF	TUN	Karim Saidi (free to (Tunisia) Club Africain)
—	MF	TUR	Nuri Şahin (end of loan (Germany) Borussia Dortmund)
—	DF	NED	Jordy Buijs (free to (Netherlands) De Graafschap)
—	MF	CHI	Sebastián Pardo (free to Universidad de Chile)
—	MF	NED	Michael Jansen (free to (Netherlands) Cambuur)
—	MF	NED	Jeffrey Altheer (loan to (Netherlands) Excelsior)
—	GK	NED	Erwin Mulder (loan to (Netherlands) Excelsior)
—	MF	NED	Jerson Ribeiro (loan to (Netherlands) Dordrecht)
—	FW	KOR	Lee Chun-soo (loan to (South Korea) Suwon Samsung Bluewings)
—	FW	NED	Nicky Hofs (loan to (Netherlands) Vitesse)
—	GK	EGY	Sherif Ekramy (loan to (Turkey) Ankaragücü)

== Club ==
=== Coaching staff ===
Position	Staff
Manager	(Netherlands) Gertjan Verbeek sacked 14 January 2009 (Netherlands) Leon Vlemmings from 14 January 2009
Assistant manager	(Netherlands) Leon Vlemmings caretaker from 14 January 2009 (Netherlands) John Lammers from 14 January 2009 (Netherlands) Patrick Lodewijks from 14 January 2009 (Netherlands) Wim Jansen resigned 14 January 2009
Assistant manager / Goalkeeping coach	(Netherlands) Patrick Lodewijks
Fitness coach	(Netherlands) Toine van de Goolberg

Last updated: 22 September 2017

=== Kit ===
Supplier: Kappa
Sponsor(s): Fortis

Home	Away	Third	Goalkeeper

Last updated: 23 July 2013.
Source: Feyenoord
