= 2008 Johan Cruyff Shield =

Johan Cruijff Schaal XIII
Feyenoord	PSV Eindhoven
0	2
- Date: 23 August 2008
- Venue: Amsterdam Arena, Amsterdam
- Referee: Kevin Blom
- Attendance: 30,000

The thirteenth edition of the Johan Cruyff Shield (Dutch: Johan Cruijff Schaal) was held on 23 August 2008 at the Amsterdam Arena. The match, which inaugurated the 2008–09 season in Dutch football, featured the 2007–08 Eredivisie champions PSV Eindhoven and 2007–08 KNVB Cup winners Feyenoord. PSV won 2–0.

== Match details ==
23 August 2008

Feyenoord	0–2	PSV Eindhoven
	Report	Lazović 55'; Marcellis 67'

Amsterdam Arena, Amsterdam
Attendance: 30,000
Referee: Kevin Blom

Feyenoord	PSV Eindhoven

GK	1	(Netherlands) Henk Timmer
CB	18	(Netherlands) Serginho Greene
CB	4	(Brazil) André Bahia
CB	5	(Netherlands) Tim de Cler
RM	14	(Netherlands) Michael Mols		(substituted off) 78'
CM	25	(Netherlands) Georginio Wijnaldum
CM	7	(Netherlands) Denny Landzaat	(yellow card) 59'
CM	10	(Netherlands) Luigi Bruins
LM	8	(Netherlands) Giovanni van Bronckhorst (c)	(yellow card) 42'
CF	30	(Netherlands) Nicky Hofs	(yellow card) 40'	(substituted off) 65'
CF	37	(Netherlands) Diego Biseswar
Substitutes:
GK	16	(Brazil) Darley
DF	35	(Netherlands) Norichio Nieveld
MF	17	(Brazil) Manteiga
MF	36	(Netherlands) Kevin Wattamaleo
FW	39	(Netherlands) Mitchell Schet		(substituted in) 65'
FW	26	(Poland) Michał Janota		(substituted in) 78'
Manager:
(Netherlands) Gertjan Verbeek

GK	1	(Sweden) Andreas Isaksson
RB	29	(Belgium) Stijn Wuytens
CB	24	(Netherlands) Dirk Marcellis	(yellow card) 44'
CB	13	(France) Jérémie Bréchet
LB	3	(Mexico) Carlos Salcido		(substituted off) 76'
DM	6	(Belgium) Timmy Simons (c)
RM	11	(Netherlands) Nordin Amrabat
CM	20	(Netherlands) Ibrahim Afellay
CM	8	(Ecuador) Édison Méndez
LM	5	(Netherlands) Mike Zonneveld	(yellow card) 62'	(substituted off) 69'
CF	9	(Serbia) Danko Lazović		(substituted off) 82'
Substitutes:
GK	31	(Brazil) Cássio
DF	4	(Mexico) Maza Rodríguez		(substituted in) 76'
DF	14	(Netherlands) Erik Pieters		(substituted in) 69'
MF	15	(Australia) Jason Čulina
MF	28	(Netherlands) Otman Bakkal
FW	10	(Netherlands) Danny Koevermans
FW	22	(Hungary) Balázs Dzsudzsák		(substituted in) 82'
Manager:
(Netherlands) Huub Stevens
