= Wetten =

Wetten may refer to:

== People ==
- Arie van Wetten (1934–2013), Dutch racing cyclist
- Even Wetten (born 1982), Norwegian former speed skater
- Jeroen van Wetten (born 1980), Dutch former footballer

== Other uses ==
- Wetten, dass..?, a German-language entertainment television show

== See also ==
- Interwetten, an online entertainment platform
- Wetteren, a municipality in the Belgian province of East Flanders
- Wetter (disambiguation)
