= Diego Biseswar =

Surinamese footballer (born 1988)

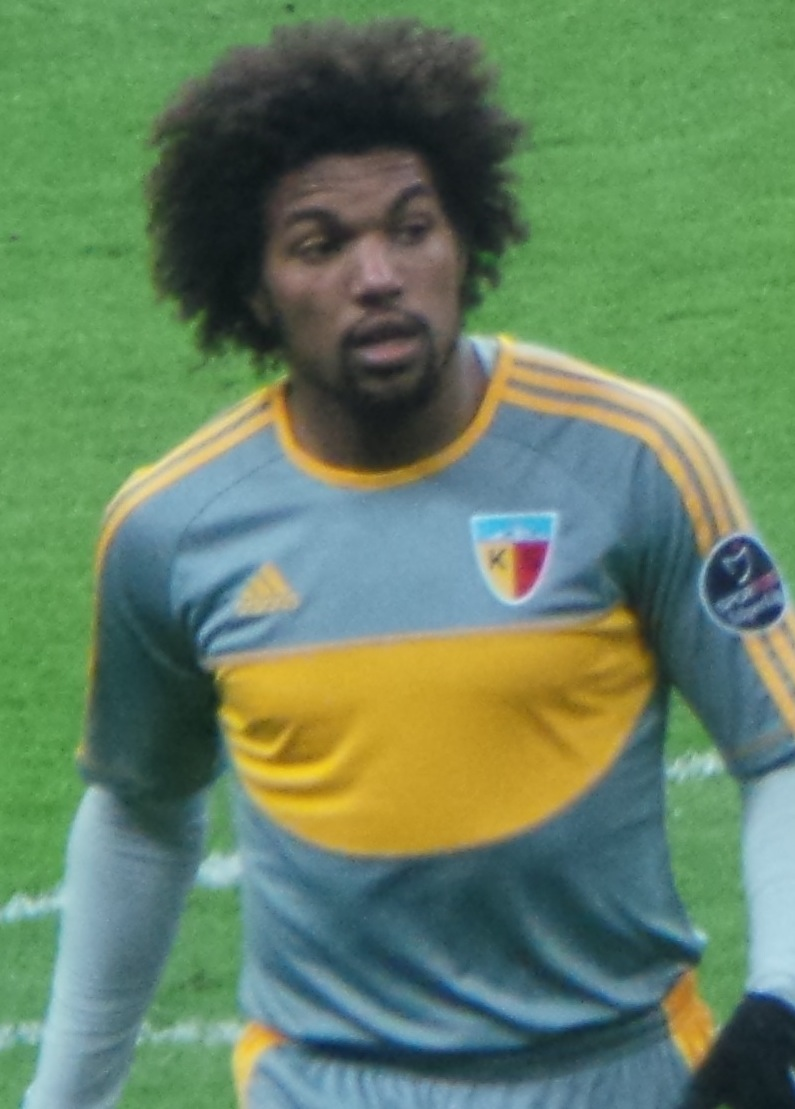
- Biseswar with Kayserispor in 2014

Personal information
- Full name: Diego Marvin Biseswar
- Date of birth: 8 March 1988 (age 38)
- Place of birth: Amsterdam, Netherlands
- Height: 1.73 m (5 ft 8 in)
- Positions: Attacking midfielder; left winger

Youth career
- 1993–1994: DWS
- 1994–1999: Ajax
- 1999–2000: DWS
- 2000–2001: Telstar
- 2001–2005: Feyenoord

Senior career*
Years	Team	Apps	(Gls)
2005–2012	Feyenoord	95	(11)
2006–2007	→ Heracles (loan)	26	(2)
2007–2008	→ De Graafschap (loan)	11	(0)
2012–2016	Kayserispor	116	(18)
2016–2023	PAOK	167	(17)
2021	→ Apollon Limassol (loan)	15	(3)
2024	SteDoCo	10	(2)
Total		430	(53)

International career
2004–2005	Netherlands U20	6	(0)
2009–2010	Netherlands U21	9	(3)
2021–2023	Suriname	15	(0)
Medal record
Men's football
Representing Netherlands
UEFA European Under-17 Championship
Runner-up	2005
- * Club domestic league appearances and goals

Diego Marvin Biseswar (born 8 March 1988) is a retired professional footballer who played as an attacking midfielder or left winger. Born in the Netherlands, he represented the Suriname national team.

== Early life ==
Biseswar was born in Amsterdam to Surinamese parents. His father was a bus driver in Amsterdam. Growing up, his only passion was football.

== Club career ==
=== Youth career ===
Biseswar's first football club was amateur club DWS. He joined Ajax after a year. After five seasons with Ajax, he was deemed "unmanageable" and was released. Bisewar has stated that he was happy to leave Ajax, saying that "Ajax thought I wasn't good enough and I wanted to leave myself. I didn't feel at ease, many friends were leaving and my relationship with the coach wasn't optimal. It was unfortunate, but there were no dreams in tatters."

Biseswar returned to former club DWS, before leaving again to play for Telstar. After one season, Biseswar was asked to join the Feyenoord youth academy, a move he was happy to make: "I visited them a few times and was quickly convinced. I had no difficulty to join Feyenoord as a boy from Amsterdam. And why? Ajax was far behind me and I always had a special feeling for Feyenoord."

After playing for Feyenoord U15 for one season, Biseswar was promoted to Feyenoord U17, in which he played for two seasons. At the end of the last season, Biseswar made his debut with Feyenoord's first team.

=== Feyenoord ===
==== Early years ====
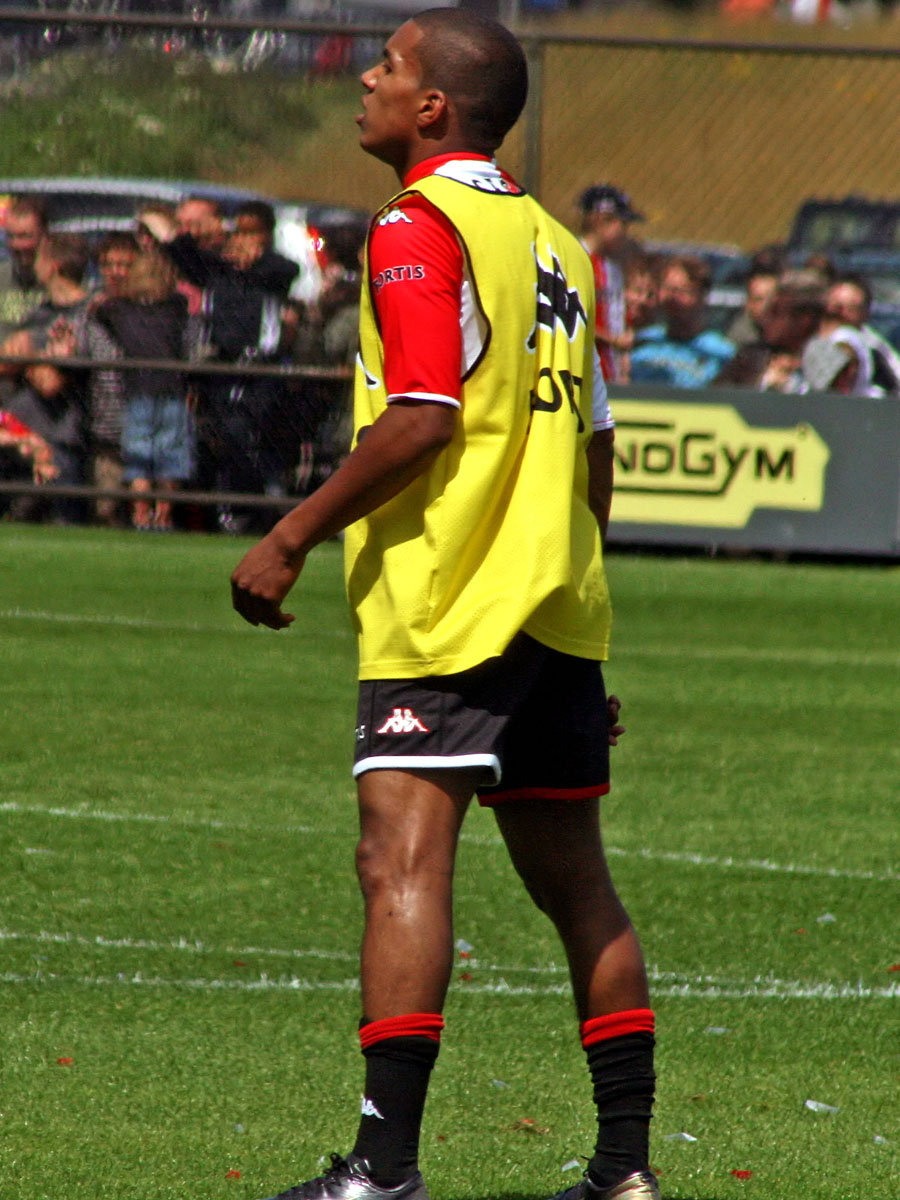
Biseswar at a Feyenoord training.

On 29 October 2004, Biseswar signed his first professional three-year contract with Feyenoord, at the age of 16. However, later that year, Biseswar was suspended by the KNVB for a month after he "played in a competition match, under a different name, in the first team of an amateur club from Amsterdam but was quickly picked out during the game as player of Feyenoord." On 22 May 2005, Biseswar made his senior Feyenoord debut by replacing Tim Vincken in the 67th minute in Feyenoord's last Eredivisie match of the 2004–05 season. Feyenoord defeated ADO Den Haag (6–3), which was also the last match under the management of Ruud Gullit.

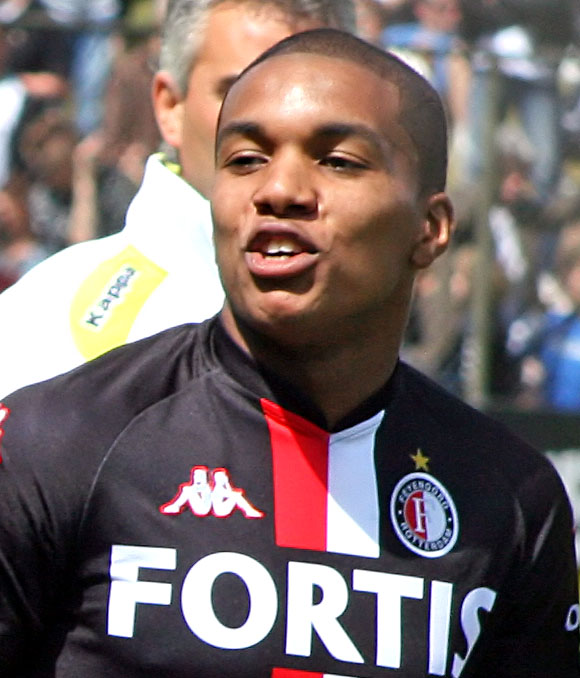
Biseswar pictured in 2007 during his time at Feyenoord.

In the 2005–06 season, Biseswar mainly played for Feyenoord U19. However, Biseswar also made six appearances in Feyenoord's first team and scored his first goal in the Eredivisie. On 20 November 2005, Biseswar replaced the injured Ali Boussaboun in the 53rd minute in the Eredivisie away match against Roda JC. In the 79th minute, Biseswar scored the winning goal. He then set up a goal for Salomon Kalou to score his second goal of the game, in a 6–1 win against Willem II on 29 December 2005. On 31 January 2006, it was announced that both Biseswar and Royston Drenthe were official members of the Feyenoord's first team. However, during a 1–1 draw against Ajax A1 on 18 February 2006, he was sent–off for his unprofessional behavior in the second half and after the match, Biseswar was banished from the first team for a month. At the end of the 2005–06 season, Biseswar went on to make six appearances and scoring once for the side.

Ahead of the 2007–08 season, Biseswar signed a contract with Feyenoord, keeping him until 2009. His first appearance of the 2007–08 season came on 26 August 2007, coming on as a late substitute, in a 5–0 win over NAC Breda. A month later on 26 September 2007, he made another appearance for the side, also coming on as a late substitute, in a 3–0 win over FC Utrecht. Just only making two appearances for the side 2007–08 season, it was expected in January that Biseswar was expecting to leave the club. It came after when he was discipline, as he was half an hour late for the Feyenoord A1 game on 27 November 2007.

==== Loan spells ====
Biseswar had two Eredivisie loan spells while at Feyenoord. For the 2006–07 season he joined Heracles Almelo. It came after he went on a trial for the club and were among six players to be cut following Erwin Koeman's decision ahead of the new season. Biseswar made his Heracles Almelo debut in the opening game of the season against FC Twente, where he came on as a substitute for Kai Michalke in early first half, then scored and set up two goals, in a 3–0 win, earning himself a Man of the Match award. Biseswar made 26 Eredivisie appearances for the club, in which he scored two goals. However, Heracles Almelo decided not to retain Biseswar for disciplinary reasons.

For the 2007–08 season, Biseswar had an unsuccessful spell at Eredivisie side De Graafschap. He made his De Graafschap debut on 2 February 2008 against Excelsior, coming on as a substitute, in a 1–1 draw. Biseswar failed to make an impression and only played 11 Eredivisie matches for the club from Doetinchem, without scoring any goals. At the end of the 2007–08 season, De Graafschap was at one point keen on signing him permanently but decided not to, due to Feyenoord's asking price.

==== Return to Feyenoord ====
For the 2008–09 season, Biseswar returned to Feyenoord; his contract was due to expire at the end of the season, and he was placed on the transfer list. As a result, Biseswar was expected to leave the club. He trialled at English club Sheffield United, but they could not afford the player. Feyenoord failed to sell the youngster, but Biseswar made a good impression during pre-season and the early league matches. Therefore, manager Gertjan Verbeek opted to give Biseswar another chance at the club. He made his first appearance for Feyenoord since returning from a loan spell from De Graafschap, starting the whole game, as they lost 2–0 loss against PSV Eindhoven in the Johan Cruyff Shield. Biseswar then scored his first goals for the side in over three years, and set up one of the goals, in a 3–0 win over FC Volendam on 13 September 2008. He then scored three goals in two matches between 2 November 2008 and 9 November 2008, including scoring a brace against FC Utrecht. However, Biseswar suffered an injury while warming up ahead of a match against HHC Hardenberg in the third round of the KNVB Cup and was sidelined for a month. After returning to the first team from injury, he then scored again for the side on 26 December 2008, in a 3–1 win over NAC Breda. Over the course of the season, Biseswar became an important first team member. As his contract was due to expire, he received interest from former club Ajax and Spanish club Valencia. On 10 March 2009, Biseswar announced he didn't want to leave Feyenoord for another Dutch club. On 3 April 2009, Biseswar signed a new three-year contract with the club. Biseswar finished the season with 30 Eredivisie matches, scoring a total of seven goals.

In the 2009–10 season, Biseswar found himself playing in the first team by coming on from the substitute bench. The decision to put Biseswar came from new manager Mario Been, who was frustrated with his mentality with the club. Despite this, he scored his first goal of the season in the second round of the KNVB Cup, in a 5–0 win over Harkemase Boys. Biseswar soon regained his first team place for the side, where he replaced Sekou Cissé, who suffered an injury and the one who dispatched Biseswar to the substitute bench. Biseswar continued to regain his first team place for the side throughout the 2009–10 season. Despite being sidelined on three occasions for the side during the 2009–10 season, Biseswar went on to make thirty–three appearances and scoring once in all competitions.

In the 2010–11 season, Biseswar, however, suffered an injury at the start of the season. At one point during the summer transfer window, he was subjected a loan transfer move to Excelsior but rejected a move to the club. Biseswar explained his decision that he wanted to stay at the club to fight for his place in the first team. However, upon returning to the first team from injury, Biseswar found his first team opportunities limited under the management of Been. But he returned to the starting lineup following an injury crisis and was featured in number of matches throughout the year. However, in January, Biseswar suffered a knee injury that saw him sidelined for two matches. On 30 January 2011, he returned to the starting lineup from injury, where he played 85 minutes, as Feyenoord lost 2–1 against FC Twente. Biseswar then scored his first goal of the season and set up the opening goal of the game for the side, as they beat Heracles Almelo 2–1 on 12 February 2011. Since returning to the first team from injury, he continued to regain his first team for the side towards the end of the season. On 10 April 2011, Biseswar then scored his second goal of the season, in a 4–0 win over FC Utrecht. In a 3–1 win over PSV Eindhoven on 24 April 2011, he played a role during the match when he set up two goals for Georginio Wijnaldum, who scored twice.

Ahead of the 2011–12 season, Biseswar was linked with a move away from Feyenoord in the summer transfer window, but the transfer move never materialised and he stayed at the club. However, Biseswar suffered an abdominal muscle injury that kept him out for two months. He returned from injury on 2 October 2011 as a substitute in a 3–0 loss against ADO Den Haag. However, upon returning from injury, Biseswar found his first team opportunities under the new management of Ronald Koeman and was placed on the substitute bench in the number of matches for the side. His attitude also caused issues by Manager Koeman that he apologised. It was announced on 26 November 2011 that Biseswar would be leaving Feyenoord in January after a contract negotiation broke down.

=== Kayserispor ===
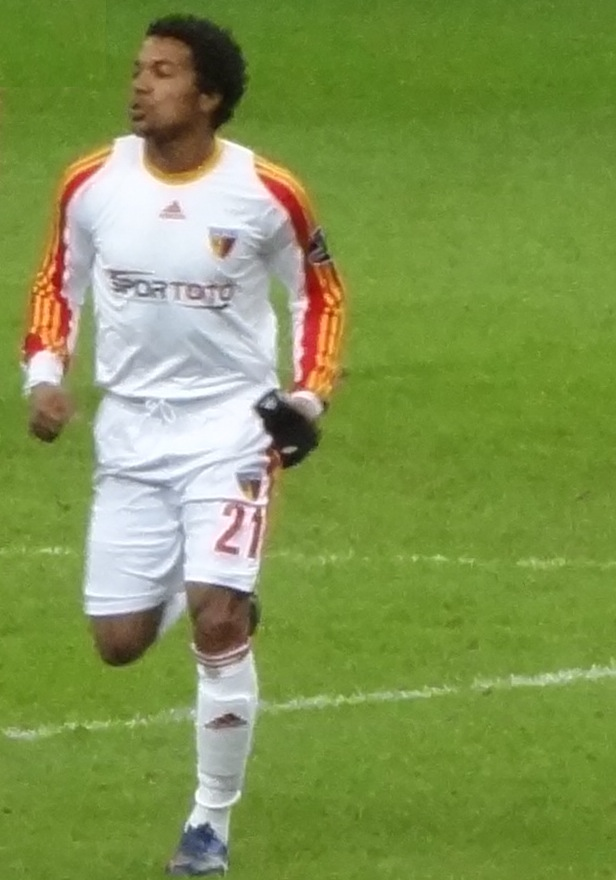
Biseswar playing for Kayserispor in the club's away shirt against Galatasaray on 11 February 2012.

Biseswar moved to Turkish club Kayserispor in January 2012, signing a four-and-a-half-year contract. The move reported to have cost 200,000 euros.

Biseswar made his Kayserispor debut on 8 January 2012, starting the whole game, in a 1–0 loss against Antalyaspor. Three days later on 11 January 2012, he set up a goal for Emir Kujović, who scored a winning goal, in a 1–0 win over Akhisar Belediyespor in the third round of the Turkish Cup. Five days later against Gaziantepspor on 16 January 2012, he set up a goal for Gökhan Ünal to score the first goal of the game, in a 1–1 draw. However, Biseswar suffered an injury that kept him out for the rest of January. He then returned from injury, coming on as a late substitute, as Kayserispor lost 1–0 against Galatasaray on 11 February 2012. Biseswar scored his first goals for the side on 7 April 2012 in a 5–0 win over Ankaragücü. During the 2011–12 season, he made 10 appearances and scored twice in all competitions.

However, at the start of the 2012–13 season, Biseswar suffered an injury that saw him miss three matches. Upon returning from injury, he scored his first goal in his first appearance of the 2012–13 season, in a 3–2 loss against Orduspor on 17 September 2012. Biseswar found himself excluded from the squad in early October after being involved in an incident at training, and he did not return to the first team until 11 November 2012. Biseswar was mainly used as a substitute during the 2012–13 season. He scored his second goal of the season in a 3–1 loss against Galatasaray on 17 March 2013. Biseswar then scored and set up the second goal of the game, in a 2–1 win over Trabzonspor on 4 May 2013. During the season, he made 22 appearances and scored three times in all competitions.

Biseswar regained his first team place at the start of the 2013–14 season. He then scored his first goal of the season, in a 1–1 draw against Gençlerbirliği on 15 September 2013. Eleven days later, Biseswar scored again in the second round of the Turkish Cup, in a 2–1 win over Pazarspor. He started in every match since the start of the season until he suffered an injury that saw him sidelined for two months. Biseswar returned from injury on 14 December 2013, starting in a 1–1 draw against Eskişehirspor. He was expected to leave Kayserispor in the January transfer window, but stayed at the club in the end. Biseswar ended his six months goal drought when he scored and set up one of the goals, in a 3–1 win over Antalyaspor on 31 March 2014. Then, on 3 May 2014, he scored again and set up one of the goals, in a 4–1 win over Eskişehirspor. But the result saw Kayserispor relegated from the Süper Lig, finishing as last place. Biseswar made 25 appearances and scoring four times in all competitions over the season.

Biseswar continued as a starter at the start of the 2014–15 season. He scored his first goal of the season on 22 November 2014 in a 2–0 win over Alanyaspor. Two weeks later on 7 December 2014, Biseswar scored again, in a 3–1 win over Osmanlıspor. On 4 February 2015 against Altınordu in the Group Stage of the Turkish Cup, he captained the side for the first time and set up one of the goals, in a 3–0 win. Two months later on 4 April 2015, Biseswar scored twice for the side, in a 4–0 win over Giresunspor. He then helped the side finish top of the TFF First League, earning the club ones again a spot in the Süper Lig.

In the 2015–16 season, Biseswar continued to regain his first team place for the side at the start of the season. He captained the side for the first time this season, which came on 28 September 2015, in a 1–0 loss against İstanbul Başakşehir. On 23 October 2015, Biseswar scored his first goal of the season, in a 3–1 win over Eskişehirspor. He then scored in a 2–1 loss against Beşiktaş on 5 December 2015, followed up by scoring twice for the side, in a 3–2 win over Akhisar Belediyespor. Throughout the 2015–16 season, Biseswar captained the side in the number of matches. On 14 May 2016, he scored his fifth goal of the season, in a 1–1 draw against Sivasspor. Despite missing two matches during the 2015–16 season,

At the end of the 2015–16 season, Biseswar was offered a new contract by Kayserispor, but he rejected it and was expected to leave the club. Until the expiration of his contract in summer 2016, he made 130 appearances scoring 19 goals in all competitions.

=== PAOK ===
In June 2016, Biseswar signed a three-year contract with Greek club PAOK on a free transfer.

He made his PAOK debut, coming on as a late substitute for Charis Charisis, as PAOK lost 2–1 to Ajax in the second leg of the third round of the UEFA Champions League, eliminating the side from the tournament. Biseswar then helped PAOK qualify for the UEFA Europa League Group Stage after beating Dinamo Tbilisi 5–0 on aggregate and set up one of the goals in the first leg. Biseswar scored on his league debut for PAOK in the opening game of the season, in a 2–1 win over Panetolikos. After the match, he was named Man of the Match. Since joining the club, he quickly became a first team regular for the side, playing in the midfield position. His second goal of the season then came on 17 December 2016, in a 5–0 win over Kerkyra. In a 3–0 win over Levadiakos on 19 January 2017, Biseswar set up the first two goals in the game, followed by scoring in the group stage of the Greek Football Cup, in a 4–1 win over Panetolikos. His performance throughout January earned Biseswar the club's Most Valuable Player for January. After adding two goals throughout April, he, once again, earned the club's Most Valuable Player for April. On 6 May 2017, the Dutch winger along with Pedro Henrique Konzen bagged the goals for Serbian manager Vladan Ivic's team, helping PAOK win the Greek Cup final with score of 2–1 against AEK Athens at Panthessaliko Stadium of Volos. This marked 5th time in the club's history that the Greek Cup Title was captured. Biseswar finished the 2016–17 season with 7 goals and 10 assists in 44 appearances in all competitions.

However, in the 2017–18 season, Biseswar found himself in the substitute bench in a number of matches for the side. As a result, he was linked with a move away from PAOK, with Gençlerbirliği interested. But there was no offers made and Biseswar eventually stayed at the club. Biseswar then received a red card for a second bookable offence at the last minutes, as PAOK lost 1–0 against rivals, AEK Athens on 5 November 2017. After returning to the first team from suspension, he scored his first goal of the season on 19 December 2017, in a 5–1 win over Aiginiakos in the group stage of the Greek Football Cup. His return saw Biseswar regain his first team place back, under the new management of Răzvan Lucescu. His third goal of the season came on 28 February 2018, in the first leg semi-finals of the Greek Football Cup, in a 3–1 win over Panionios. Two months later, on 22 April 2018, Biseswar scored and set up one of the goals, in a 2–1 win over Xanthi. He later helped the side overcome AEK Athens to lift the Greek Cup at the Olympic Stadium in Athens after an enthralling final ended in a 2–0 win for the Salonica club, as PAOK retain Greek Cup to wreck AEK's double dream.

In the 2018–19 season, Biseswar started the season when on 15 September 2018, he was named Man of the Match as he scored his first goal for the 2018–19 Super League season as exchanged passes with Morocco midfielder Omar El Kaddouri on the edge of the OFI penalty area, before bursting into the box and firing a low right-footed shot to open the score and also provided two assists in a 3–1 away win against OFI. On 14 November 2018, he scored his first season goal in the Greek Cup as he cut to a shooting position outside of the penalty area, curling a wonderful effort past the outstretched grasp of Ergotelis goalkeeper Manolis Kalogerakis, in a 2–1 away win. Biseswar continued to be in the first team regular under the management of Răzvan Lucescu. He scored two more goals for the side by the end of 2018, adding the tally to four goals to this season so far. Five days after scoring in a 3–0 win over Panionios on 19 January 2019, Biseswar signed a three–year contract with the club, keeping him until 2022. His 100th appearance for the club came on 27 January 2019, where he set up one of the goals, in a 4–0 win over OFI. Biseswar then scored two goals in two matches between 10 February 2019 and 18 February 2019, including a 3–1 win over rivals, Olympiacos. On 7 April 2019, he scored his 7th goal in the League, a season record in his career so far, as the Dutch midfielder picking up possession in the left channel and skipping past the challenge of Mark Asigba before scoring with a measured, right-footed shot in a 3–0 home win game against Lamia in his club's rally to win the title after 34 years. A few minutes earlier he gave a precise cross to his teammate Yevhen Shakhov to score with a header, his 10th assist in all competitions for the 2018–19 season, a season's record in his career. On 21 April 2019, Dimitris Giannoulis was fouled in the penalty area and Biseswar stepped up to confidently slot home a Panenka style spot-kick from 12 yards, as PAOK finally ended their 34-year wait for a league title with a 5–0 win against relegated Levadiakos and win the Super League title. At the end of the 2018–19 season, Biseswar made forty appearances and scoring ten times in all competitions. On 13 August 2019, he scored a brace in Johan Cruyff Arena in a 3–2 away loss against Ajax as PAOK went out 5–4 on aggregate after another thrilling encounter between the two teams in 2019–20 UEFA Champions League third qualifying round. On 7 December 2019, he scored his first goal for the 2019–20 season, with a kick in a 2–0 home win game against Xanthi F.C. in his club's effort to retain last year's title.

In the 2019–20 regular season, Biseswar failed to match his form in the 2018–19 season, featuring in 21 league matches, managing one goal and four assists.

Biseswar was voted best left winger of the decade (2010–2020) by the fans of PAOK. At the end of September 2020, Bisewar was linked with a transfer to UAE Pro League club Al Ain FC, but the deal did not complete as he could not agree personal terms with the club.

On 19 January 2021 it was announced that Biseswar would move on loan to Apollon Limassol in the Cypriot First Division for the remainder of 2020–21 season.

In the summer of 2023 his contract with PAOK ended, and he left the club after seven years, 251 appearances, 27 goals and 41 assists.

=== Return to the Netherlands ===
In February 2024 Biseswar returned to the Netherlands with SteDoCo.

== International career ==
Biseswar played for the Netherlands at under-16, under-17, under-19, under-21 and B-international level.

Biseswar played at the 2005 UEFA European Under-17 Football Championship in Italy, scoring a late group stage winner against Israel. The goal took the Netherlands through to the semi-final against hosts Italy. Biseswar was mentioned in the team of the tournament, but couldn't save his team from losing in the final to Turkey. With a second place, the Netherlands U17 qualified for the 2005 FIFA U-17 World Championship in Peru. Biseswar's team finished third after losing the semi-final against eventual winners Mexico U17 (0–4), but winning the third place play-off match against Turkey U17 (2–1).

In October 2008, Biseswar was called up to the Netherlands U21 squad for the first time, but was not used. He made his Netherlands U21 debut on 11 August 2009, starting in a 0–0 draw against England U21. Biseswar then scored his first Netherlands U21 goal on 4 September 2009, in a 2–0 win over Finland U21. On 3 March 2010, he scored twice, in a 3–2 win over Poland U21. Biseswar went on to make nine appearances and scoring three times for the Netherlands U21 side. Despite this, he reflected about his time, playing for the Netherlands youth team, quoting: "I still think it is an honor to play for the highest youth team of the KNVB."

In March 2009, Biseswar was called up by Manager Johan Neeskens for the B-international squad. He made his Netherlands B debut on 3 June 2009, where he played 52 minutes, in a 4–0 loss against Argentina U20. Biseswar went on to make two more appearances for the side.

On 21 January 2020, Biseswar accepted a proposal from the Suriname national team. He earned his first cap on 27 March 2021 against Aruba with a 0–6 win. In June 2021 Biseswar was named to the Suriname squad for the 2021 CONCACAF Gold Cup.

== Personal life ==
Biseswar's parents are from Suriname, although he was once (incorrectly) thought to be eligible for Trinidad and Tobago citizenship. He has one older sister and one younger brother, who is named Romario. The Biseswar boys were named after football icons Maradona and Romário.

Despite growing up in Amsterdam, Bisewar's family are fans of the Rotterdam-based Feyenoord club. Biseswar is a father of three sons and is married.

== Career statistics ==
=== Club ===
Appearances and goals by club, season and competition
Club	Season	League			Cup		Europe		Other		Total	
Club	Season	Division	Apps	Goals	Apps	Goals	Apps	Goals	Apps	Goals	Apps	Goals
Feyenoord	2004–05	Eredivisie	1	0	–		–		–		1	0
Feyenoord	2005–06	Eredivisie	6	1	–		–		–		6	1
Feyenoord	2007–08	Eredivisie	1	0	–		–		–		1	0
Feyenoord	2008–09	Eredivisie	30	7	1	0	4	0	–		35	7
Feyenoord	2009–10	Eredivisie	29	1	1	0	0	0	–		30	1
Feyenoord	2010–11	Eredivisie	23	2	4	1	0	0	–		27	3
Feyenoord	2011–12	Eredivisie	5	0	1	0	0	0	–		6	0
Feyenoord	Total		95	11	7	1	4	0	0	0	106	12
Heracles Almelo (loan)	2006–07	Eredivisie	26	2	–		–		–		26	2
De Graafschap (loan)	2007–08	Eredivisie	11	0	–		–		–		11	0
Kayserispor	2011–12	Süper Lig	8	2	2	0	–		4	2	14	4
Kayserispor	2012–13	Süper Lig	22	3	–		–		–		22	3
Kayserispor	2013–14	Süper Lig	23	3	2	1	–		–		25	4
Kayserispor	2014–15	TFF First League	31	5	6	0	–		–		37	5
Kayserispor	2015–16	Süper Lig	32	5	4	0	–		–		36	5
Kayserispor	Total		116	18	14	1	0	0	4	2	134	21
PAOK	2016–17	Super League Greece	30	5	7	2	7	0	–		44	7
PAOK	2017–18	Super League Greece	20	1	8	2	4	0	–		32	3
PAOK	2018–19	Super League Greece	27	8	9	2	4	0	–		40	10
PAOK	2019–20	Super League Greece	31	2	5	1	4	2	–		40	5
PAOK	2020–21	Super League Greece	5	0	0	0	5	0	–		10	0
PAOK	2021–22	Super League Greece	29	1	7	0	16	1	–		52	2
PAOK	2022–23	Super League Greece	25	0	7	0	1	0	–		33	0
PAOK	Total		167	17	43	7	41	3	0	0	251	27
Apollon Limassol (loan)	2020–21	Cypriot First Division	15	3	–		–		–		15	3
SteDoCo	2023–24	Derde Divisie B	10	2	–		–		2	0	12	2
Career total			430	53	64	9	45	3	6	2	545	67

=== International ===
Appearances and goals by national team and year
National team	Year	Apps	Goals
Suriname	2021	6	0
Suriname	2022	4	0
Suriname	2023	5	0
Total		15	0

== Honours ==
PAOK

- Super League Greece: 2018–19
- Greek Football Cup: 2016–17, 2017–18, 2018–19

Individual

- Greek Football Cup: 2016–17 Most Valuable Player of the Final
