= Luigi Bruins =

Dutch footballer (born 1987)

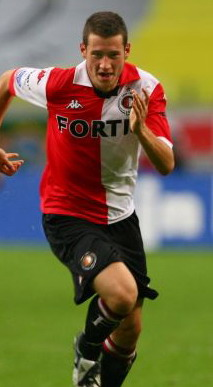
- Bruins with Feyenoord in 2008

Personal information
- Full name: Luigi Maud Bruins
- Date of birth: 9 March 1987 (age 39)
- Place of birth: Rotterdam, Netherlands
- Height: 1.80 m (5 ft 11 in)
- Position: Attacking midfielder

Team information
- Current team: Katwijk (manager)

Youth career
- 1993–2004: Excelsior

Senior career*
Years	Team	Apps	(Gls)
2004–2007	Excelsior	66	(10)
2007–2011	Feyenoord	90	(11)
2011	Red Bull Salzburg	3	(0)
2012	Excelsior	9	(2)
2013–2014	Nice	22	(1)
2013–2014	Nice II	4	(1)
2014–2021	Excelsior	173	(22)
2021–2024	Smitshoek	16	(1)

International career
2005	Netherlands U19	2	(1)
2007–2008	Netherlands U21	10	(2)

Managerial career
- 2024–2026: Zwaluwen
- 2026-: Katwijk
Medal record
Men's football
Representing Netherlands
UEFA European Under-21 Championship
Winner	2007 Netherlands
- * Club domestic league appearances and goals

Luigi Bruins (born 9 March 1987) is a Dutch football manager and professional player. Bruins played in the position of attacking midfielder.

After being declined by Feyenoord at the age of six, the Rotterdam-born went through the complete Excelsior youth academy. Bruins made his first team debut in the season 2004–05 and managed to win the Eerste Divisie title in the subsequent season. After a successful Eredivisie debut, Bruins signed a four-year deal with the club that first declined him, Feyenoord.

Bruins was part of the Netherlands U21 squad winning the UEFA European Under-21 Football Championship in 2007.

== Club career ==
=== Excelsior Rotterdam ===
==== 1993–2004: Youth teams ====
Bruins was born in Rotterdam, Netherlands. Bruins started playing football at the age of six. As the Rotterdam-born was aiming for the highest level, he signed up for a talent practice session at Feyenoord. However, Feyenoord decided not to invite Bruins to join the youth academy. Eventually, Bruins was asked to join Excelsior instead. Bruins went through the complete Excelsior youth academy, until he made his professional debut in 2005.

==== 2004–2006: Breakthrough ====
Bruins made his professional debut for Excelsior in the season 2004–05. On 28 January 2005, Bruins replaced Santi Kolk in the 78th minute of the Eerste Divisie away match against FC Eindhoven (3–0). It was the first and only match Bruins played in his first season.

Bruins had his breakthrough in the season 2005–06. Under the management of the new Excelsior coach Mario Been, Bruins was positioned on his favorite right midfielder position in a 4–3–3 system. Bruins scored his first professional goal in the season opening away match against Cambuur Leeuwarden (0–1) on 12 August 2005. From the start of the season, Excelsior unexpectedly battled for the Eerste Divisie championship. When Excelsior won the home match against championship favorite VVV-Venlo (3–1) on 31 March 2006, the third club from Rotterdam secured the Eerste Divisie 2005–06 title. Bruins played an important role in Excelsior's Eredivisie promotion, scoring 4 goals in 35 matches.

==== 2006–2007: Eredivisie ====
After Excelsior's surprising promotion, the Rotterdam club was an almost certain relegation candidate for the season 2006–07. The club had the lowest Eredivisie budget and only few players with Eredivisie experience. Bruins made his Eredivisie debut on 19 August 2006, in the home match against Roda JC (0–1). Bruins scored his first Eredivisie goals on 9 September 2006, as he scored two penalty kicks in the home match against SC Heerenveen (3–1). Excelsior finished the Eredivisie on a 16th place, which meant they had to compete in the promotion/relegation playoffs. After wins against BV Veendam and RBC Roosendaal, Excelsior remained in the top tier.

While at Excelsior, Bruins was linked to various domestic and foreign clubs. Besides the Dutch sides Ajax, AZ and PSV, also Tottenham Hotspur were interested in the talented midfielder. On 26 January 2006, Feyenoord announced the signing of Bruins. The youngster would join the club for the season 2007–08, signing a four-year deal.

=== 2007–2011: Feyenoord ===
Bruins transfer to Feyenoord was overshadowed by the arrival of experienced players like Roy Makaay from Bayern Munich, Giovanni van Bronckhorst from Barcelona and Kevin Hofland from VfL Wolfsburg. Due to the heavy competition within the team, it was expected the talented Bruins would mainly play a role as substitute. However, after the departure of Royston Drenthe to Real Madrid, Feyenoord coach Bert van Marwijk promoted Bruins to a first team regular, filling in the left winger position. Bruins played 27 Eredivisie matches in his first Feyenoord season, scoring six goals.

After various minor injuries, Bruins slowly started to lose his first team regular status in the season 2008–09. Due to lack of playing time, player agent Sietje Mouch stated it was better for Bruins to temporary leave Feyenoord on loan in the winter transfer window of January 2010.

=== 2011–2014: Salzburg, Excelsior and Nice ===
In October 2011, Bruins signed a contract with Red Bull Salzburg until the end of the 2011–12 season. His contract was cancelled after only three games and he left Salzburg at the end of 2011.

Luigi Bruins went on trial at Rangers and was linked with VVV-Venlo. On 9 March 2012, Bruins signed with his former team Excelsior until the end of the season.

Bruins signed a contract with Nice on 15 January 2013. In one and a half years' time, he played 22 matches for the French side, in which he scored once. After his contract had not been extended, he left the club as a free agent in June 2014.

=== 2014–2024: Excelsior and Smitshoek ===
On 13 September 2014, it was announced that Bruins had returned to Excelsior for the third time. He signed a deal until the end of the season.

In July 2021, Bruins joined fifth-tier Hoofdklasse club VV Smitshoek for a three-year term. After these three years, he retired from playing football.

== International career ==
Bruins was part of the Netherlands U21 winning the 2007 UEFA European Under-21 Football Championship. Jong Oranje retained its 2006 UEFA European Under-21 Football Championship title in style with a 4–1 win over Serbia U21 in the final. Bruins scored the fourth Dutch goal, securing the victory.

In the summer of 2008, Bruins missed out on a place in the Netherlands Olympic team. He was mentioned in the pre-selection, but wasn't part of the final 18.

== Managing career ==
Bruins started managing Zwaluwen Vlaardingen in 2024. In January 2026 he was announced the new manager of Katwijk from the 2026–27 season.

== Career statistics ==
As of 1 August 2020

Appearances and goals by club, season and competition
Club	Season	League			National cup		League cup		Other		Total	
Club	Season	Division	Apps	Goals	Apps	Goals	Apps	Goals	Apps	Goals	Apps	Goals
Excelsior	2004–05	Eerste Divisie	1	0	0	0	0	0	0	0	1	0
Excelsior	2005–06	Eerste Divisie	35	4	0	0	0	0	0	0	35	4
Excelsior	2006–07	Eredivisie	30	6	0	0	0	0	0	0	30	6
Excelsior	Total		66	10	0	0	0	0	0	0	66	10
Feyenoord	2007–08	Eredivisie	27	6	0	0	0	0	0	0	27	6
Feyenoord	2008–09	Eredivisie	22	1	1	0	0	0	4 (Note: One Appearance in Johan Cruyff Shield, three Appearances in UEFA Europa League)	0	27	1
Feyenoord	2009–10	Eredivisie	21	2	1	0	0	0	0	0	22	2
Feyenoord	2010–11	Eredivisie	20	2	1	0	0	0	2 (Note: Appearances in UEFA Europa League)	0	23	2
Feyenoord	Total		90	11	3	0	0	0	6	0	99	11
Red Bull Salzburg	2011–12	Austrian Bundesliga	3	0	1	0	0	0	0	0	4	0
Excelsior	2011–12	Eredivisie	9	2	0	0	0	0	0	0	9	2
Nice II	2012–13	CFA 2	2	0	0	0	0	0	0	0	2	0
Nice II	2013–14	CFA	2	1	0	0	0	0	0	0	2	1
Nice II	Total		4	1	0	0	0	0	0	0	4	1
Nice	2012–13	Ligue 1	10	1	0	0	0	0	0	0	10	1
Nice	2013–14	Ligue 1	12	0	3	0	2	0	0	0	17	0
Nice	Total		22	1	3	0	2	0	0	0	27	1
Excelsior	2014–15	Eredivisie	22	2	2	0	0	0	0	0	24	2
Excelsior	2015–16	Eredivisie	18	0	1	0	0	0	0	0	19	0
Excelsior	2016–17	Eredivisie	24	2	1	0	0	0	0	0	25	2
Excelsior	2017–18	Eredivisie	27	5	1	0	0	0	0	0	28	5
Excelsior	2018–19	Eredivisie	29	6	1	1	0	0	2 (Note: Appearances in Eredivisie play-offs)	0	32	7
Excelsior	2019–20	Eerste Divisie	25	4	2	0	0	0	0	0	27	4
Excelsior	2020–21	Eerste Divisie	0	0	0	0	0	0	0	0	0	0
Excelsior	Total		145	19	8	1	0	0	2	0	155	22
Career total			339	44	15	1	2	0	8	0	364	45

== Honours ==
Excelsior

- Eerste Divisie: 2005–06

Feyenoord

- KNVB Cup: 2007–08

Netherlands U21

- UEFA European Under-21 Football Championship: 2007
