= Bergkamp =

Bergkamp is a surname. Notable people with the surname include:

- Dennis Bergkamp (born 1969), Dutch footballer and coach
- Roland Bergkamp (born 1991), Dutch footballer
- Vera Bergkamp (born 1971), Dutch politician
