= Jean Fritz Boom =

Haitian footballer (born 2000)

Personal information
- Full name: Jean Fritz Louis Boom
- Date of birth: 9 January 2000 (age 26)
- Place of birth: Port-au-Prince, Haiti
- Position: Centre-back

Youth career
- 2011–2012: vv Moordrecht
- 2012–: ADO Den Haag
- 2020–2021: Fortuna Sittard

Senior career*
Years	Team	Apps	(Gls)
2021–2022	Ermis Aradippou		
2022–2024	Westlandia		
2024	TOGB	0	(0)

International career^{‡}
2021	Haiti	2	(0)
- * Club domestic league appearances and goals as of 19:23, 8 October 2024 (UTC) ‡ National team caps and goals as of 20:02, 5 September 2021 (UTC)

Jean Fritz Louis Boom (born 9 January 2000) is a Haitian retired footballer who played as a centre-back for the Haiti national team. Boom was born in Haiti, but adopted when he was a little child and grew up in Moordrecht in the Netherlands.

== Career ==
A youth product of vv Moordrecht, and ADO Den Haag, Boom moved to the reserves of Fortuna Sittard on 19 June 2020. He transferred to the Cypriot side Ermis Aradippou FC on 18 August 2021. He joined TOGB from fellow amateur side Westlandia in summer 2024, only to retire after denying surgery to an injured knee.

== International career ==
Born in Haiti and raised in the Netherlands, Boom was on the standby list for the Netherlands U17s in January 2017. He was called up to the Haiti U23s in 2020, but the games got postponed due to the outbreak of COVID-19. Boom made his debut with the Haiti in a friendly 6–1 loss to Bahrain on 2 September 2021.
