= Wetter (surname) =

Wetter is a surname. Notable people with the surname include:

- Ernst Wetter (1877–1963), Swiss politician
- Fabian Wetter (born 1989), German footballer
- Friedrich Wetter (born 1928), German cardinal archbishop of Munich and Freising
- Harry Wetter (1882–1934), Welsh international rugby union player
- Herbert Wetter (1891–1966), Norwegian Olympic swimmer in Swimming at the 1912 Summer Olympics – Men's 1500 metre freestyle
- Jack Wetter (1887–1967), Welsh international rugby union player
- Paul Alan Wetter, American medical doctor

== See also ==
- Berend von Wetter-Rosenthal (1874–1940), Baltic-German politician
- Wetter (disambiguation)
