= Youri de Winter =

Dutch footballer (born 1998)

Personal information
- Date of birth: 26 June 1998 (age 28)
- Place of birth: Rotterdam, Netherlands
- Height: 1.89 m (6 ft 2 in)
- Position: Winger

Team information
- Current team: TOGB
- Number: 10

Youth career
- Nike Academy
- Sparta

Senior career*
Years	Team	Apps	(Gls)
2016–2019	Jong Sparta	47	(13)
2019–2020	Scheveningen	16	(2)
2020	Kerkyra	3	(0)
2020–2021	Excelsior Maassluis	3	(0)
2021	Assyriska FF	1	(0)
2021–2022	Noordwijk	23	(3)
2022–	TOGB	45	(13)
- * Club domestic league appearances and goals as of 8 October 2024

Youri de Winter (born 26 June 1998) is a Dutch footballer who plays as a winger for TOGB.

== Career ==
At the age of 17, de Winter joined the English Nike Academy.

In 2019, he signed for Scheveningen in the Dutch third division from the reserves of Dutch top flight side Sparta.

In 2020, de Winter signed for Kerkyra in the Greece, where he made 3 league appearances and scored 1 goal, before joining Dutch third division club Excelsior Maassluis after a trial.
