= Jeroen van Wetten =

Dutch footballer (born 1980)

Personal information
- Date of birth: 2 January 1980 (age 46)
- Place of birth: Leiderdorp, Netherlands
- Position: Forward

Senior career*
Years	Team	Apps	(Gls)
–2000	UVS Leiden		
2000–2001	Jong ADO Den Haag		
2000–2001	ADO Den Haag	1	(0)
2001–2003	RBC Roosendaal	7	(0)
2003–2005	VV Noordwijk		
2005–2007	DOTO Pernis		
2007–2008	ASWH		
2008–2012	BVV Barendrecht	19	(3)
- * Club domestic league appearances and goals

Jeroen van Wetten (born 2 January 1980) is a Dutch former professional footballer who played as a forward.

== Football career ==
=== ADO Den Haag and RBC Roosendaal ===
As a professional, Van Wetten played one season for ADO Den Haag (2000–01) and two seasons for RBC Roosendaal (2001–03). The last season at RBC, when Van Wetten played the most league games in his professional career, RBC played in the Eredivisie. For RBC, Van Wetten was especially valuable in the KNVB Cup, scoring three goals. In 2003, Van Wetten negotiated a transfer with Íþróttabandalag Vestmannaeyja from Iceland. The sides did not come to an agreement.

=== Noordwijk, DOTO, ASWH and BVV ===
Van Wetten continued to VV Noordwijk (2003–05) and DOTO Pernis (2005–07). On 26 August 2006, Van Wetten scored the 80th minute sole and decisive goal in a DOTO 2006–07 KNVB Cup game against GVVV. It brought DOTO to play against FC Twente in the next round, a game it lost 7–1.

Subsequently Van Wetten played for ASWH (2007–08) and BVV Barendrecht (2008–12). From Barendrecht, Van Wetten considered a 2011 return to RBC that had gone bankrupt and attempted to restart in the Hoofdklasse. The restart fell through that year and Van Wetten finished his football career the next summer in Barendrecht instead. Overall, Van Wetten scored 3 goals over 19 league games for BVV.

== Later career and personal life ==
Van Wetten was born in Leiderdorp. Subsequent to his football career, Van Wetten worked as a business intelligence professional.

== Career statistics ==
Appearances and goals by club, season and competition
Club	Season	League		
Club	Season	Division	Apps	Goals
ADO Den Haag	2000–01	Eerste Divisie	1	0
RBC Roosendaal	2001–02	Eerste Divisie	2	0
RBC Roosendaal	2002–03	Eredivisie	5	0
RBC Roosendaal	Total		7	0
Career total			8	0
