= Wetter =

Wetter may refer to:

- Wetter (surname)
- Wetter (Ruhr), a town in the Ruhr area, Germany
- Wetter, Hesse, a town in Hesse, Germany
- Wetter (river), a minor river in Hessen, Germany
- Vättern, a lake in Sweden
- "Wetter" (song), a 2009 song by the rapper Twista

== See also ==
- Wētā, an extremely large grasshopper-like insect endemic to New Zealand
- Weather (disambiguation) (Wetter in German)
