= Kevin Wattamaleo =

Dutch footballer

Personal information
- Full name: Kevin Greg Wattamaleo
- Date of birth: 25 January 1989 (age 37)
- Place of birth: Rotterdam, Netherlands
- Height: 1.81 m (5 ft 11 in)
- Position: Midfielder

Youth career
- Sparta Rotterdam
- Feyenoord

Senior career*
Years	Team	Apps	(Gls)
2008–2010	Feyenoord	4	(0)
2009–2010	→ Excelsior (loan)	24	(3)
2010–2012	Excelsior	63	(4)
2012–2013	NEC	3	(0)
2013–2015	FC Volendam	29	(1)
2016–2017	AFC 2		
2017–2018	GLZ Delfshaven		
- * Club domestic league appearances and goals

Kevin Greg Wattamaleo (born 25 January 1989) is a Dutch former professional footballer who played as a midfielder.

== Career ==
Wattamaleo started in the youth of Sparta Rotterdam, before making the move to Feyenoord where he made his professional debut on 30 November 2008. He replaced Tim de Cler in the 84th minute of the Eredivisie away match against Vitesse Arnhem (1–1). He played a total of four matches in his first season, after which he joined Eerste Divisie club Excelsior on loan.

With Excelsior's surprising promotion after the season 2009–10, Wattamaleo returned on the highest level, as he signed a two-year deal with the new Eredivisie club. However, he couldn't prevent Excelsior losing the season opening match against De Graafschap (3–0).

After the relegation of Excelsior, at the end of the 2011–12 season, Wattamaleo was released. In November 2012 he signed with NEC until the end of the season.

After one season, in which he played only three matches, Wattamaleo left NEC on a free transfer and signed a two-year contract with FC Volendam.

After six months without a club, Wattamaleo started playing for the reserves of Amsterdamsche FC (AFC) in January 2016, and moved to GLZ Delfshaven in June 2017. He retired from football in July 2018.

== Career statistics ==
Appearances and goals by club, season and competition
Club	Season	League			KNVB Cup		Europe		Other		Total	
Club	Season	Division	Apps	Goals	Apps	Goals	Apps	Goals	Apps	Goals	Apps	Goals
Feyenoord	2008–09	Eredivisie	4	0	0	0	1	0	–		5	0
Excelsior	2009–10	Eerste Divisie	23	3	0	0	–		–		23	3
Excelsior	2010–11	Eredivisie	27	1	0	0	–		3	1	31	2
Excelsior	2011–12	Eredivisie	11	0	1	0	–		–		12	0
Excelsior	Total		63	4	1	0	0	0	3	1	64	4
NEC	2012–13	Eredivisie	3	0	0	0	–		–		3	0
FC Volendam	2013–14	Eerste Divisie	23	1	0	0	–		–		23	1
FC Volendam	2014–15	Eerste Divisie	6	0	0	0	–		–		6	0
FC Volendam	Total		29	1	0	0	0	0	0	0	29	1
Career total			99	5	1	0	1	0	3	1	104	6
