= Kevin Hofland =

Dutch footballer (born 1979)

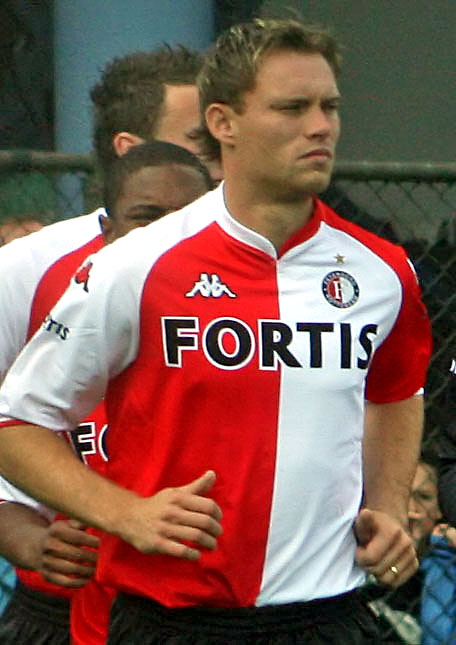
- Hofland with Feyenoord in 2007

Personal information
- Date of birth: 7 June 1979 (age 47)
- Place of birth: Heerlen, Netherlands
- Height: 1.85 m (6 ft 1 in)
- Position: Centre-back

Youth career
- 1983–1989: Limburgia
- 1989–1997: Fortuna Sittard

Senior career*
Years	Team	Apps	(Gls)
1997–2000	Fortuna Sittard	59	(1)
2000–2004	PSV	78	(4)
2004–2007	VfL Wolfsburg	76	(2)
2007–2011	Feyenoord	55	(3)
2010–2011	→ AEK Larnaca (loan)	25	(5)
2011–2012	AEK Larnaca	10	(0)
Total		233	(15)

International career
1999–2000	Netherlands U21	13	(1)
2008	Netherlands B	1	(0)
2000–2006	Netherlands	7	(0)

Managerial career
- 2012–2014: Limburgia (assistant)
- 2014–2018: PSV (youth)
- 2014–2015: Limburgia
- 2018–2020: Fortuna Sittard (assistant)
- 2020: Fortuna Sittard
- 2021: VfL Wolfsburg (assistant)
- 2022: Willem II
- 2023–2024: Meerssen
- 2024–2025: Helmond Sport
- * Club domestic league appearances and goals

Kevin Hofland (born 7 June 1979) is a Dutch professional football manager and former player who most recently managed of Eerste Divisie club Helmond Sport.

A centre back during his career, Hofland played 15 active seasons in which he amassed Eredivisie totals of 182 games and eight goals in 10 years, namely for PSV and Feyenoord. He also represented VfL Wolfsburg and AEK Larnaca in Germany and Cyprus, respectively.

Hofland became a Netherlands international in the 2000s, earning seven caps.

== Club career ==
=== Fortuna ===
Hofland was born in Heerlen, but grew up in Brunssum, Limburg. He joined local SV Limburgia at the age of just four, moving to the professionals with Fortuna Sittard six years later.

Hofland played in various positions during his youth career, mainly as a left midfielder or left back. In 1995, he was reconverted by manager Henk Duut into a central defender, where he remained for the rest of his career.

On 10 September 1997, Hofland made his Eredivisie debut with Fortuna, against Sparta Rotterdam (1–1 away draw). He finished his first season with only six league appearances, but subsequently became a starter, helping the side to the 12th-place in the 1999–00 campaign.

=== PSV ===
In summer 2000, Hofland signed with national giants PSV Eindhoven. Despite his young age and the heavy competition within the team, he quickly became an important player in the team's defence but, after a serious ankle injury in a 2002–03 UEFA Champions League group stage match against Arsenal, he lost his starting position to Wilfred Bouma.

Hofland played 20 matches in 2003–04 to help the Philips outfit finished second in the domestic championship, to AFC Ajax. After the arrival of Alex on loan from Chelsea he decided to leave the club, having won a total of four major titles.

=== Wolfsburg ===
Former PSV manager Eric Gerets was one of the main reasons for Hofland to join VfL Wolfsburg in Germany. He went on to play three seasons in the Bundesliga, making his debut in the competition on 7 August 2004 in a 2–1 win at Borussia Dortmund (90 minutes played).

In his last two years with the Wölfen, Hofland played in 49 games combined scoring twice, but the team ranked 15th on both occasions, being the first side above the relegation zone.

=== Feyenoord and AEK ===
On 28 June 2007, Hofland signed with Feyenoord, for four years. He only managed to appear in eight league games in the 2009–10 season, winning the first and only Dutch Cup of his career in 2008.

In the 2010 offseason Hofland was loaned to Cypriot First Division club AEK Larnaca FC, helping the team to the fourth position in both the regular season and the second stage, whilst scoring a career-best five goals and being team captain.

Hofland signed a permanent deal with AEK in July 2011. On 17 March of the following year, however, he officially retired from professional football after another injury to his ankle.

== International career ==
On 15 November 2000, Hofland played his first international match with Netherlands, starting in an away friendly with Spain in Seville (2–1 win).

Four of his seven caps for the Oranje came during the ill-fated 2002 FIFA World Cup qualification campaign.

== Managerial career ==
On 22 April 2020, it was announced that Hofland had signed a two-year contract as the new head coach of Fortuna Sittard, starting from the 2020–21 season. His predecessor Sjors Ultee became technical director from that moment on. He was dismissed by Fortuna on 11 November 2020, after the club only gained 3 points in its first 8 league games of the season.

On 2 June 2021, he was hired by VfL Wolfsburg in Germany, a club he also played for, as an assistant coach to Mark van Bommel.

On 14 March 2022, Willem II appointed Hofland as head coach on a deal until the end of the 2021–22 season, replacing Fred Grim. Despite the club suffering relegation at the end of the season, Hofland extended his contract until 2024. Hofland was fired in December 2022.

After managing amateur club Meerssen in the fourth-tier Derde Divisie in the 2023–24 season, Hofland returned to professional management ahead of the 2024–25 season after being appointed head coach of Eerste Divisie club Helmond Sport on 26 March 2024. He was dismissed on 3 February 2025 due to disappointing results.

== Career statistics ==
=== Club ===
Club performance			League		Cup		Continental		Total	
Season	Club	League	Apps	Goals	Apps	Goals	Apps	Goals	Apps	Goals
Netherlands			League		KNVB Cup		Europe		Total	
1997–98	Fortuna Sittard	Eredivisie	6	0	0	0	0	0	6	0
1998–99	Fortuna Sittard	Eredivisie	29	1	0	0	0	0	29	1
1999–00	Fortuna Sittard	Eredivisie	24	0	0	0	0	0	24	0
2000–01	PSV	Eredivisie	29	2	0	0	0	0	29	2
2001–02	PSV	Eredivisie	22	2	0	0	0	0	22	2
2002–03	PSV	Eredivisie	7	0	0	0	0	0	7	0
2003–04	PSV	Eredivisie	20	0	0	0	0	0	20	0
Germany			League		DFB-Pokal		Europe		Total	
2004–05	Wolfsburg	Bundesliga	27	0	0	0	0	0	27	0
2005–06	Wolfsburg	Bundesliga	19	2	0	0	0	0	19	2
2006–07	Wolfsburg	Bundesliga	30	0	0	0	0	0	30	0
Netherlands			League		KNVB Cup		Europe		Total	
2007–08	Feyenoord	Eredivisie	27	1	0	0	0	0	27	1
2008–09	Feyenoord	Eredivisie	20	1	0	0	0	0	20	1
2009–10	Feyenoord	Eredivisie	5	1	2	0	0	0	7	1
Total	Netherlands		186	7	2	0	0	0	188	7
Total	Germany		76	2	0	0	0	0	76	2
Career total			262	9	2	0	0	0	264	9

=== International ===
National team	Club	Season	Apps	Goals
Netherlands	PSV	2000–01	2	0
Netherlands	PSV	2001–02	4	0
Netherlands	PSV	2002–03	0	0
Netherlands	PSV	2003–04	0	0
Netherlands	Wolfsburg	2004–05	1	0
Total			7	0

International appearances and goals
#	Date	Venue	Opponent	Result	Goals	Competition
2000–01
1.	15 November 2000	Estadio Olímpico, Sevilla, Spain	Spain	1–2	0	Friendly
2.	25 April 2001	Philips Stadion, Eindhoven, Netherlands	Cyprus	4–0	0	2002 World Cup qualification
2001–02
3.	15 August 2001	White Hart Lane, London, England	England	0–2	0	Friendly
4.	1 September 2001	Lansdowne Road, Dublin, Republic of Ireland	Republic of Ireland	1–0	0	2002 World Cup qualification
5.	5 September 2001	Philips Stadion, Eindhoven, Netherlands	Estonia	5–0	0	2002 World Cup qualification
6.	6 October 2001	Gelredome, Arnhem, Netherlands	Andorra	4–0	0	2002 World Cup qualification
2002–03
2003–04
2004–05
7.	18 August 2004	Råsunda Stadium, Stockholm, Sweden	Sweden	0–0	0	Friendly

== Honours ==
Fortuna

- KNVB Cup: Runner-up 1998–99

PSV

- Eredivisie: 2000–01, 2002–03
- Johan Cruijff Shield: 2000, 2001
- KNVB Cup: Runner-up 2000–01

Feyenoord

- KNVB Cup: 2007–08, runner-up: 2009–10

== Personal life ==
Hofland is married. He and his wife have three sons and a daughter.
