= Tim Vincken =

Dutch football coach (born 1986)

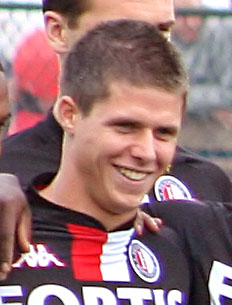
- Vincken in 2007

Personal information
- Full name: Tim Joost Christiaan Vincken
- Date of birth: 12 September 1986 (age 40)
- Place of birth: Berkel en Rodenrijs, Netherlands
- Height: 1.72 m (5 ft 8 in)
- Position: Winger

Team information
- Current team: Netherlands U18 (head coach)

Youth career
- TOGB
- Feyenoord

Senior career*
| Years | Team | Apps | (Gls) |
| 2005–2009 | Feyenoord | 29 | (1) |
| 2009–2010 | → Excelsior | 8 | (3) |
| 2010–2012 | Excelsior | 46 | (5) |
| 2012–2014 | De Graafschap | 58 | (9) |
| 2014–2015 | Atlético Baleares | 16 | (1) |
| 2016–2018 | Capelle | 21 | (2) |
| Total | | 178 | (21) |

International career
- Netherlands U20

Managerial career
- 2018–2019: TOGB (youth)
- 2019–2022: Almere City (youth)
- 2022–2026: Sparta Rotterdam (youth)
- 2024–2026: Netherlands U17 (assistant)
- 2026–: Netherlands U18
- * Club domestic league appearances and goals

Tim Joost Christiaan Vincken (born 12 September 1986) is a Dutch former professional footballer who played as a winger for Feyenoord, Excelsior, De Graafschap, Atlético Baleares, and VV Capelle. Vincken currently works as a youth coach for Sparta Rotterdam and assistant coach for the Netherlands national under-17s.

== Club career ==
Vincken made three appearances for the Feyenoord first team during the 2004–05 season, making his professional debut in the away match against NEC Nijmegen on 8 May 2005, which ended in a 0–2 loss.

Vincken scored his first goal for Feyenoord in a match against local rivals Sparta Rotterdam on 23 December 2006. His goal resulted in a win for his club. Though considered to be very talented, Vincken regularly suffered from injuries which made Feyenoord to decide to not extend his contract in June 2010. He subsequently signed with Excelsior, where he had already spent time on loan the previous season. In June 2012, Vincken signed a two-year deal with De Graafschap, which was not extended two years later. He signed with Atlético Baleares in December 2014. Vincken returned to the Netherlands in 2016, playing for lower league side vv Capelle, where he retired after one season.

In 2018, Vincken was appointed assistant under head coach Ivo Loovens for the TOGB under-17 team. This marked his return to the club where he began his footballing career; something fellow former professional Roland Bergkamp also did, as he became assistant to the U17 reserves.

== International career ==
He was a member of the Dutch squad playing at the FIFA U-20 World Cup in 2005 held in his home country the Netherlands. The team was eliminated in the quarter final against Nigeria.
