= Michał Janota =

Polish footballer (born 1990)

Personal information
- Date of birth: 29 July 1990 (age 36)
- Place of birth: Gubin, Poland
- Height: 1.71 m (5 ft 7 in)
- Position: Attacking midfielder

Team information
- Current team: Mazovia Mińsk Mazowiecki
- Number: 90

Youth career
- UKP Zielona Góra
- 2006–2008: Feyenoord

Senior career*
Years	Team	Apps	(Gls)
2008–2010	Feyenoord	6	(0)
2009–2010	→ Excelsior (loan)	29	(7)
2010–2012	Go Ahead Eagles	57	(9)
2012–2015	Korona Kielce	76	(6)
2015	Pogoń Szczecin	9	(0)
2015	Pogoń Szczecin II	2	(1)
2015–2016	Górnik Zabrze	11	(0)
2015–2016	Górnik Zabrze II	9	(0)
2016–2017	Podbeskidzie	23	(1)
2017–2018	Stal Mielec	27	(5)
2018–2019	Arka Gdynia	32	(10)
2019–2020	Al Fateh	11	(1)
2020–2021	Central Coast Mariners	15	(0)
2021–2023	Podbeskidzie	52	(2)
2024	Zagłębie Sosnowiec	13	(0)
2024–	Mazovia Mińsk Mazowiecki	54	(3)

International career
2005–2006	Poland U16	4	(1)
2005–2007	Poland U17	9	(5)
2007	Poland U18	1	(0)
2009	Poland U19	1	(1)
2009	Poland U21	2	(0)
2010	Poland U23	1	(1)
- * Club domestic league appearances and goals as of 21:42, 22 June 2026 (UTC)

Michał Janota (Polish pronunciation: [ˈmixaw jaˈnɔta]; born 29 July 1990) is a Polish professional footballer who plays as an attacking midfielder for III liga club Mazovia Mińsk Mazowiecki.

== Club career ==
Janota was born in Gubin. He joined Feyenoord in 2006 from UKP Zielona Góra. He made his debut for Feyenoord on 23 August 2008, coming on as a substitute against PSV Eindhoven in the Dutch Super Cup. His first appearance in the Eredivisie came on 31 August as a substitution against Heracles Almelo. He got on the scoresheet for the first time on 24 September with a brace against TOP Oss in the KNVB Cup.

In July 2009, he joined Excelsior on loan in the Eerste Divisie. In June 2010, Janota left Feyenoord on a free transfer and signed a two-year contract with Eerste Divisie side Go Ahead Eagles, with an option for a third year. The team reached the 2010–11 promotion playoffs but dropped out in the first round.

On 18 June 2012, Janota signed a one-year contract with Polish Ekstraklasa side Korona Kielce, with an option for further two years.

In 2018, he signed for Arka Gdynia.

In December 2020, Janota joined Australian A-League club Central Coast Mariners as a foreign player.

In August 2021, Janota returned to Poland, signing a two-year contract with I liga club Podbeskidzie. On 12 October 2023, whilst acting as the club captain, he was demoted to the reserves team for 'disciplinary reasons'. Six days later, he left Podbeskidzie by mutual consent.

On 24 January 2024, he signed a six-month contract with Zagłębie Sosnowiec. He left the club at the end of June 2024, following Zagłębie's last-place finish and relegation.

In September 2024, Janota joined IV liga Masovia club Mazovia Mińsk Mazowiecki.

== Career statistics ==
As of match played 21 June 2026

Appearances and goals by club, season and competition
Club	Season	League			National cup (Note: Includes KNVB Cup, Polish Cup, King's Cup)		Europe		Other		Total	
Club	Season	Division	Apps	Goals	Apps	Goals	Apps	Goals	Apps	Goals	Apps	Goals
Feyenoord	2008–09	Eredivisie	6	0	2	2	1 (Note: Appearance in UEFA Cup)	0	1 (Note: Appearance in Johan Cruyff Shield)	0	10	2
Excelsior (loan)	2009–10	Eerste Divisie	29	7	1	1	—		—		30	8
Go Ahead Eagles	2010–11	Eerste Divisie	30	5	2	0	—		2 (Note: Appearance in Eerste Divisie promotion play-offs)	0	34	5
Go Ahead Eagles	2011–12	Eerste Divisie	27	4	3	0	—		2	0	32	4
Go Ahead Eagles	Total		57	9	5	0	—		4	0	66	9
Korona Kielce	2012–13	Ekstraklasa	24	2	2	1	—		—		26	3
Korona Kielce	2013–14	Ekstraklasa	35	4	1	0	—		—		36	4
Korona Kielce	2012–13	Ekstraklasa	17	0	1	0	—		—		18	0
Korona Kielce	Total		76	6	4	1	—		—		80	7
Pogoń Szczecin	2014–15	Ekstraklasa	9	0	—		—		—		9	0
Pogoń Szczecin II	2014–15	III liga, gr. D	2	1	—		—		—		2	1
Górnik Zabrze	2015–16	Ekstraklasa	11	0	0	0	—		—		11	0
Górnik Zabrze II	2015–16	III liga, gr. F	9	0	—		—		—		9	0
Podbeskidzie	2016–17	I liga	23	1	0	0	—		—		23	1
Stal Mielec	2017–18	I liga	27	5	0	0	—		—		27	5
Arka Gdynia	2018–19	Ekstraklasa	32	10	1	0	—		1 (Note: Appearance in Polish Super Cup)	1	34	11
Al Fateh	2019–20	Saudi Pro League	11	1	2	0	—		—		13	1
Central Coast Mariners FC	2020–21	A-League Men	15	0	0	0	—		—		15	0
Podbeskidzie	2021–22	I liga	17	0	1	0	—		—		18	0
Podbeskidzie	2022–23	I liga	24	1	1	0	—		—		25	1
Podbeskidzie	2023–24	I liga	11	1	0	0	—		—		11	1
Podbeskidzie	Total		52	2	2	0	—		—		54	2
Zagłębie Sosnowiec	2023–24	I liga	13	0	—		—		—		13	0
Mazovia Mińsk Mazowiecki	2024–25	IV liga Masovia	25	3	—		—		—		25	3
Mazovia Mińsk Mazowiecki	2025–26	IV liga Masovia	27	0	—		—		2 (Note: Appearances in IV liga promotion play-offs)	0	29	0
Mazovia Mińsk Mazowiecki	Total		52	3	—		—		2	0	54	3
Career total			424	45	17	4	1	0	8	1	450	50

== Honours ==
Arka Gdynia

- Polish Super Cup: 2018

Mazovia Mińsk Mazowiecki

- Polish Cup (Siedlce regionals): 2024–25, 2025–26

Individual

- Ekstraklasa Player of the Month: December 2018
