= Roland Bergkamp =

Dutch footballer (born 1991)

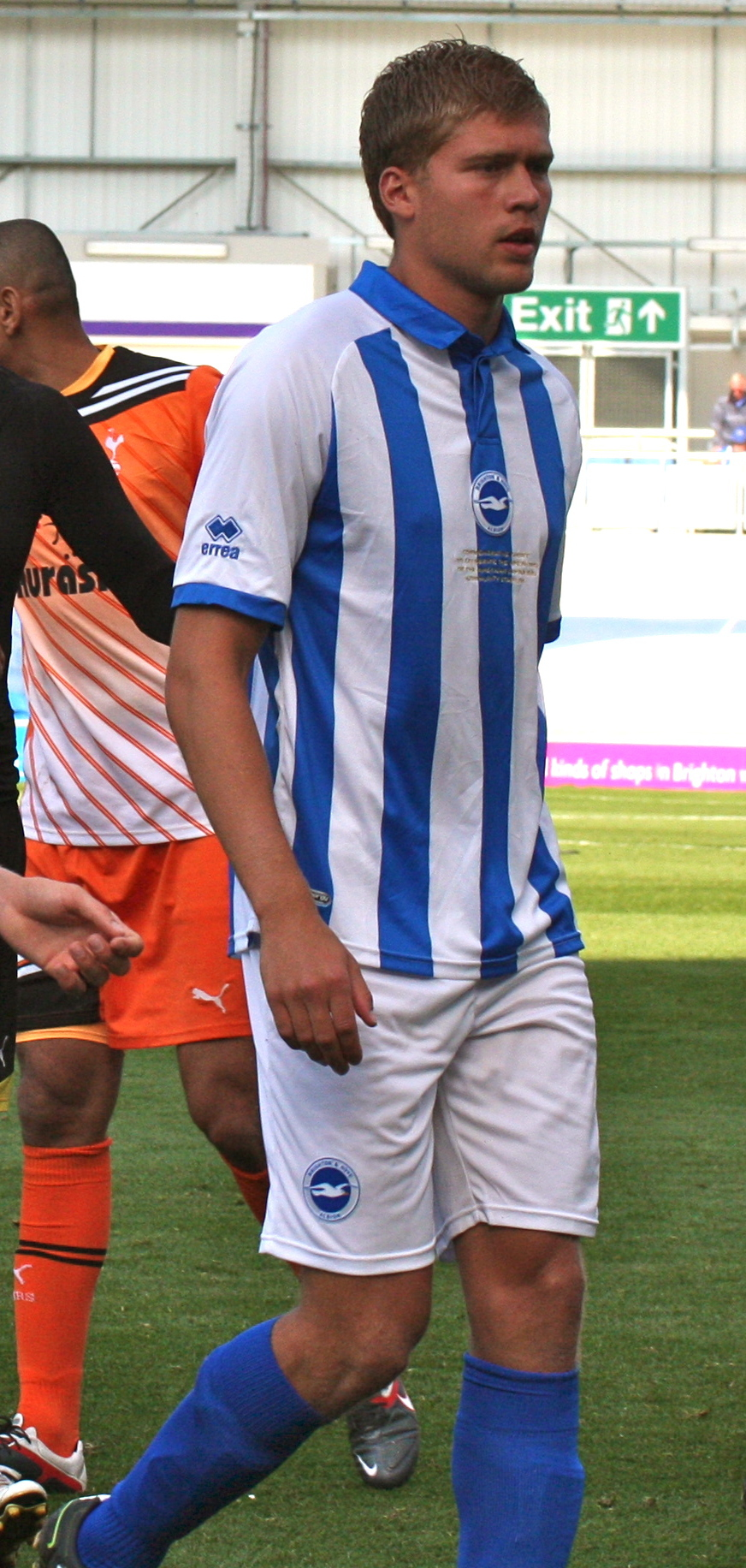
- Bergkamp in 2011

Personal information
- Full name: Roland Adrianus Martinus Bergkamp
- Date of birth: 3 April 1991 (age 35)
- Place of birth: Amstelveen, Netherlands
- Height: 1.96 m (6 ft 5 in)
- Position: Forward

Youth career
- TOGB
- 2006–2009: Excelsior

Senior career*
Years	Team	Apps	(Gls)
2009–2011	Excelsior	56	(8)
2011–2013	Brighton & Hove Albion	0	(0)
2011–2012	→ Rochdale (loan)	5	(0)
2012–2013	→ VVV-Venlo (loan)	10	(0)
2013–2015	FC Emmen	72	(26)
2015–2017	Sparta Rotterdam	32	(6)
2016–2017	Jong Sparta	5	(0)
2017–2019	RKC Waalwijk	51	(4)
2019–2020	VV Katwijk		
Total		231	(44)

International career
2011	Netherlands U-21	1	(0)
- * Club domestic league appearances and goals

Roland Adrianus Martinus Bergkamp (born 3 April 1991) is a Dutch former professional footballer who played as a forward.

== Club career ==
Bergkamp began his career on youth side with Excelsior and was promoted to the senior team. He made his professional debut in the Jupiler League on 14 August 2009 against FC Den Bosch and in the Eredivisie on 15 August 2010 against Feyenoord Rotterdam.

On 1 July 2011, having rejected a new contract at Excelsior, Bergkamp signed for newly promoted Championship side Brighton & Hove Albion on a two-year deal, for an undisclosed fee.

On 17 November 2011, Bergkamp signed for League One side Rochdale on an initial six-week loan deal. Bergkamp made his debut in a 1–0 away win at Preston on 19 November 2011.

During the summer of 2012, Bergkamp signed a loan deal at Eredivisie side VVV-Venlo for the remainder of the 2012–13 season. He made his debut in a 2–2 draw against NEC Nijmegen.

After failing to make an appearance for Brighton, Bergkamp was released on 21 May 2013.

Bergkamp returned to Rotterdam in summer 2015, when he signed for Sparta after a successful stint at FC Emmen.

After a two-year stint at RKC Waalwijk, Bergkamp moved to VV Katwijk where he retired in April 2020.

== International career ==
Bergkamp earned his first call-up for the Netherlands U21 national team for a friendly game against Germany U21 and made in the game on 25 March 2011 his debut.

== Personal life ==
Roland is the nephew of former Ajax, Inter Milan and Arsenal striker Dennis Bergkamp. His father Ad Bergkamp is currently an orthopedic oncologist at his former club Excelsior Rotterdam.

== Honours ==
Sparta Rotterdam

- Eerste Divisie: 2015–16
