= Manteiga =

Brazilian footballer

Personal information
- Full name: David Henrique dos Santos
- Date of birth: 19 March 1990 (age 36)
- Place of birth: Maceió, Brazil
- Height: 1.78 m (5 ft 10 in)
- Position: Defensive midfielder

Team information
- Current team: Central

Youth career
- Conchalense
- 2003–2006: Vitória
- 2006–2007: Criciúma
- 2007–2008: Gama

Senior career*
Years	Team	Apps	(Gls)
2008	Gama	5	(0)
2008–2010	Feyenoord	0	(0)
2009–2010	→ Excelsior (loan)	0	(0)
2010	→ Ponte Preta (loan)	13	(0)
2016	Central	0	(0)
- * Club domestic league appearances and goals as of 23:55, 28 March 2010 (UTC) ‡ National team caps and goals as of 20:35, 3 March 2009 (UTC)

David Henrique dos Santos (born 19 March 1990 in Maceió) is a Brazilian footballer who currently plays as a defensive midfielder.

Manteiga formerly played for Gama in his country Brazil before signing for Feyenoord in 2008. After loan spells Excelsior and Ponte Preta he returned to Brazil to play for Grêmio Prudente.
