= Leon Vlemmings =

Dutch footballer and manager (born 1970)

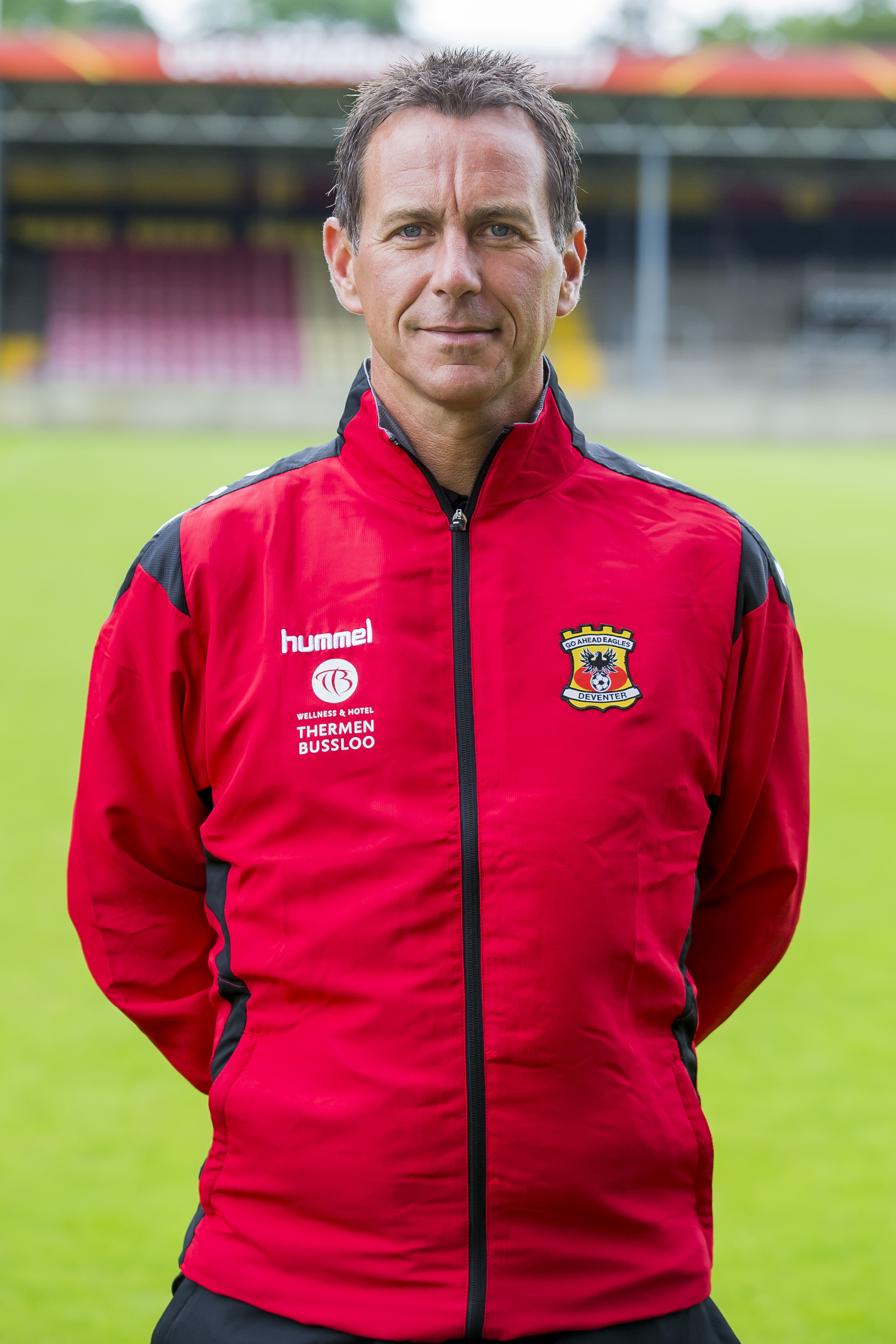
- Vlemmings in 2017

Personal information
- Date of birth: 3 April 1970 (age 56)
- Place of birth: Gemert, Netherlands
- Position: Midfielder

Team information
- Current team: Helmond Sport (development director)

Youth career
- Gemert

Senior career*
Years	Team	Apps	(Gls)
1989–1990	Helmond Sport	9	(0)
1987–1988	Gemert		
1990–1992	Wageningen	61	(3)
1992	Den Bosch	2	(0)

Managerial career
- 1991–2000: PSV (youth)
- 2000–2001: Eindhoven (assistant)
- 2001–2005: Eindhoven
- 2005–2006: Netherlands U19 (assistant)
- 2006–2008: NAC Breda (assistant)
- 2008–2011: Feyenoord (assistant)
- 2009: Feyenoord (interim)
- 2011–2012: AEK Larnaca
- 2012–2013: Excelsior
- 2017: Go Ahead Eagles
- * Club domestic league appearances and goals

Leon Vlemmings (born 3 April 1970) is a Dutch football manager and former professional player.

After a brief playing career as a midfielder, he moved into coaching and football administration, holding roles as head coach, assistant coach and executive at several clubs in the Netherlands and abroad. Vlemmings has served as assistant and interim head coach of Feyenoord, head coach of clubs including Excelsior and Go Ahead Eagles, and in senior executive positions at Roda JC, Helmond Sport and Dordrecht.

== Playing career ==
Vlemmings' career as a professional footballer was relatively short. He played as a midfielder for Wageningen, Helmond Sport and Den Bosch. In between his spells in professional football, he spent two seasons with VV Gemert, from his hometown, competing in the Eerste Klasse, then the fourth tier of the Dutch football league system.

During his time at Den Bosch, Vlemmings was medically assessed as unfit for professional football, after which he decided to end his playing career. At the age of 22, he turned his focus to coaching.

== Coaching and executive career ==
After nine years working as coach within the youth academy of PSV, Vlemmings moved to FC Eindhoven in 2000. He spent one season as assistant coach before being appointed head coach, a position he held for four years. Following his departure from Eindhoven, he worked as an assistant coach with the Netherlands under-19 national team.

Ahead of the 2006–07 season, Vlemmings joined NAC Breda as assistant coach to Ernie Brandts, with whom he had previously worked at PSV. On 18 December 2007, his contract was extended until 2013; however, several months later he left the club to take up a role at Feyenoord.

Vlemmings joined Feyenoord on 1 July 2008 as assistant coach to Gertjan Verbeek. On 14 January 2009, he was appointed interim head coach following Verbeek's resignation earlier that day. The following season, he returned to an assistant role under Mario Been. During preparations for the 2011–12 season, Been stepped down and Vlemmings again served briefly as interim head coach. On 21 July, after the appointment of Ronald Koeman as Feyenoord's new head coach, the club announced that Vlemmings' contract would be terminated with immediate effect. Vlemmings stated that his departure was an act of solidarity with Been.

In December 2011, Vlemmings was appointed head coach of Cypriot club AEK Larnaca on a contract running until the end of the season, succeeding Ton Caanen. On 3 May 2012, it was announced that he would take over as head coach of Excelsior from the summer break, replacing John Lammers. He signed a two-year contract. During the 2012–13 season, Excelsior finished 15th in the Eerste Divisie, the club's lowest league position since the 1997–98 season. Despite having a year remaining on his contract, Vlemmings and the club mutually agreed to part ways at the end of the season. He was succeeded by Jon Dahl Tomasson.

On 30 August 2013, Vlemmings was appointed technical manager of Roda JC, signing a five-year contract. He resigned from the position on 26 May 2014 following the club's relegation from the Eredivisie and the dismissal of head coach Jon Dahl Tomasson, stating that he saw "no future in continued cooperation".

On 8 May 2017, it was announced that Vlemmings would become head coach of Go Ahead Eagles from the 2017–18 season, following the club's relegation from the Eredivisie the previous day. He was dismissed on 4 December 2017, having become the sixth head coach of the club in a three-year period.

In March 2018, Vlemmings was appointed chief executive officer of his former club Helmond Sport, signing a contract until 30 June 2020. In October 2018, his contract was extended by three years, which would have kept him at the club until 2023. In June 2020, Vlemmings stepped down from his position with immediate effect, together with the club's board, following an impasse surrounding plans for a proposed new stadium as part of the Sport- en Beleefcampus De Braak project. The club withdrew from the project amid financial uncertainty during the COVID-19 pandemic, leading the board and executive management to make way for new leadership.

In 2021, Vlemmings joined FC Dordrecht as technical and innovation manager, where he was responsible for leading the club's long-term strategic development project. His tenure came to an end in November 2024, when the club and Vlemmings parted ways by mutual agreement following differences over the direction of the project. In January 2025, Vlemmings returned to FC Dordrecht after both parties reached renewed agreement on the club's strategic course, restoring their cooperation.

== Personal life ==
Alongside his coaching career, Vlemmings has been co-owner of a management consultancy firm since 2000. He has also worked on behalf of the Royal Dutch Football Association (KNVB) in the renewal of the UEFA Pro Licence coaching programme.
