= Norichio Nieveld =

Dutch footballer (born 1989)

Personal information
- Date of birth: 25 April 1989 (age 37)
- Place of birth: 's-Hertogenbosch, Netherlands
- Height: 1.89 m (6 ft 2 in)
- Position: Centre back

Team information
- Current team: VV Papendrecht

Youth career
- OSC '45
- 1999–2002: FC Den Bosch
- 2002–2008: Feyenoord

Senior career*
Years	Team	Apps	(Gls)
2008–2009	Feyenoord	3	(0)
2009–2012	Excelsior	95	(4)
2012–2013	PEC Zwolle	4	(0)
2013–2015	Eindhoven	72	(4)
2015–2017	Go Ahead Eagles	28	(0)
2018–2019	TOP Oss	47	(3)
2019–2022	Kozakken Boys	21	(0)
2022–	VV Papendrecht		

International career
2003–2004	Netherlands U15	4	(1)
2004–2005	Netherlands U16	5	(0)
2005–2006	Netherlands U17	13	(2)
2007	Netherlands U18	2	(0)
2008	Netherlands U19	3	(0)
2009–2010	Netherlands U20	2	(0)
- * Club domestic league appearances and goals

Norichio Nieveld (born 25 April 1989) is a Dutch footballer who plays as a centre-back for Eerste Klasse club VV Papendrecht.

He formerly played for Feyenoord, Excelsior, PEC Zwolle, FC Eindhoven and Go Ahead Eagles. He is also a former Netherlands youth international, gaining 29 caps at different age levels.

== Club career ==
Born in Den Bosch, and playing youth football at OSC '45, FC Den Bosch and Feyenoord, Nieveld made his senior debut for Feyenoord during the 2008–09 season, before moving to Excelsior a season later.

In the summer of 2012 Nieveld moved to PEC Zwolle after being a free agent. He was signed after playing with Team VVCS, which consists of unemployed football players. On 14 July 2013, he signed with Eindhoven, who had just appointed Jean-Paul de Jong as head coach. After two seasons with Eindhoven, Go Ahead Eagles picked him up on a free transfer. After two years in Deventer, Nieveld again found himself looking for a club. At the end of July 2017, he was on trial at VVV-Venlo, but declined a contract as he did not wish to serve as a back-up behind Nils Röseler and Jerold Promes. In January 2018 Nieveld continued his career at FC Oss.

In February 2019, it was announced that Nieveld had signed with Kozakken Boys in the Tweede Divisie. In April 2022, he joined VV Papendrecht ahead of the 2022–23 season.

== International career ==
Nieveld is of Surinamese descent, and has represented the unofficial Suriname national football team in a friendly 1–1 tie with Trinidad and Tobago Pro League champions W Connection in 2014. He is also a former Netherlands youth international.

== Personal life ==
Nieveld began studying law at the Open University of the Netherlands during the later part of his football career and trained as a junior lawyer while at Kozakken Boys. In a January 2023 interview, he stated that he had not become wealthy from football and therefore maintained a regular job alongside the sport.
