= 2008–09 Eredivisie =

53rd season of the Eredivisie

Eredivisie
- Season: 2008–09
- Dates: 29 August 2008 – 10 May 2009
- Champions: AZ (2nd title)
- Relegated: FC Volendam; De Graafschap
- Champions League: AZ (group stage); FC Twente (third qualifying round)
- Europa League: SC Heerenveen (play-off round; via KNVB Cup); Ajax (play-off round); PSV (third qualifying round); NAC Breda (second qualifying round; via playoff)
- Goals: 870
- Average goals/game: 2.84
- Top goalscorer: Mounir El Hamdaoui (23)
- Biggest home win: Ajax 7-0 Willem II (12 April 2009)
- Biggest away win: De Graafschap 0-6 Ajax (21 December 2008)
- Highest scoring: PSV 6-2 Ajax (19 April 2009); Volendam 3-5 PSV (8 February 2009); Twente 6-2 Sparta (6 December 2008)

Locations of the 2008–09 Eredivisie teams
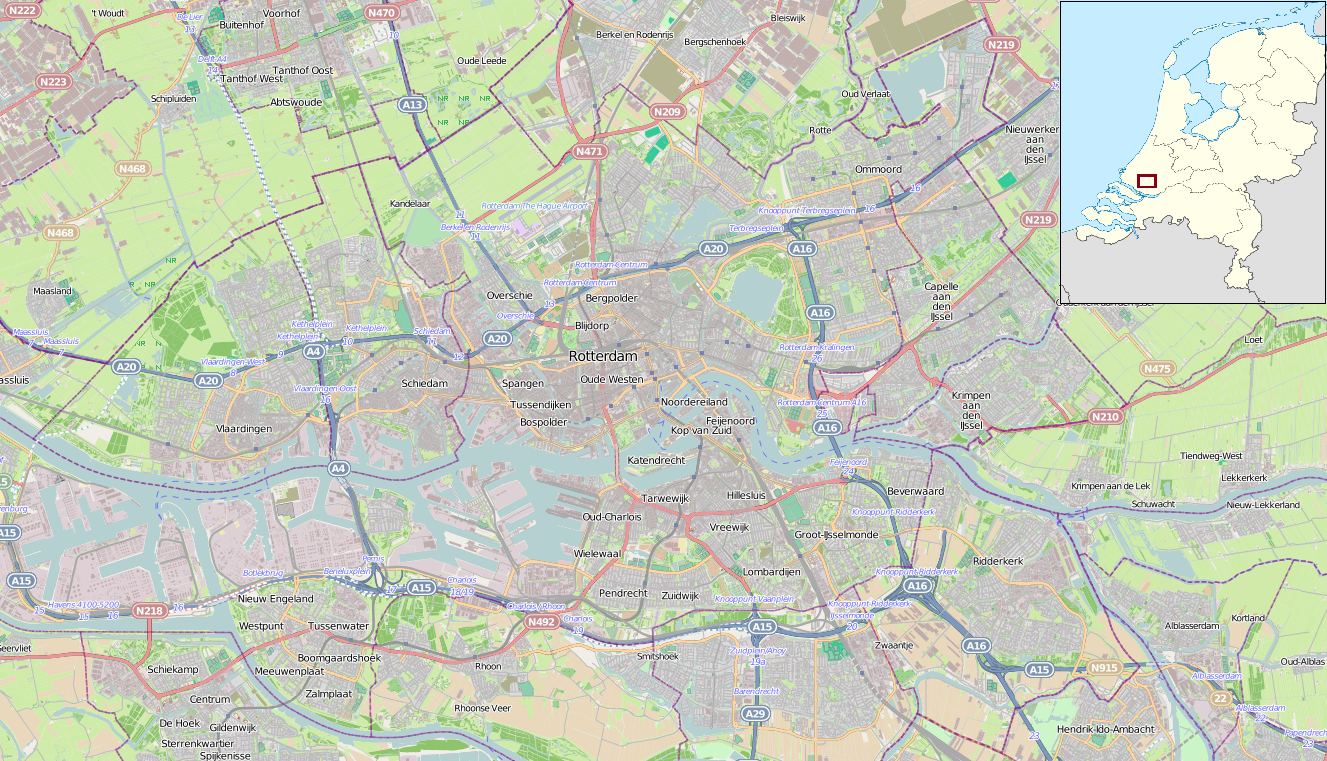
Rotterdam Eredivisie football clubs

The 2008–09 Eredivisie was the 53rd season of Eredivisie since its establishment in 1955. PSV were the reigning champions. The season began on 29 August 2008 with a game between Vitesse Arnhem and FC Groningen and ended on 10 May 2009. A total of 18 teams take part in the league, consisting of 16 who competed in the previous season and two promoted from the Eerste Divisie. The teams promoted from the Eerste Divisie at the end of the previous season were champions FC Volendam, and play-off winners ADO Den Haag. AZ clinched their second title, their first coming in 1981.

== Overview ==
Club	Location	Manager	Previous managers during 2008–09 season	Kit maker	Shirt sponsor
ADO Den Haag	The Hague	(Netherlands) Raymond Atteveld	(Netherlands) André Wetzel	Hummel	Fit For Free
Ajax	Amsterdam	(Netherlands) John van 't Schip	(Netherlands) Marco van Basten	Adidas	Aegon
AZ	Alkmaar	(Netherlands) Louis van Gaal		Canterbury of New Zealand	DSB Bank
Feyenoord	Rotterdam	(Netherlands) Leon Vlemmings	(Netherlands) Gertjan Verbeek	Kappa	Fortis
De Graafschap	Doetinchem	(Bosnia and Herzegovina) Darije Kalezić	(Netherlands) Henk van Stee	kwd	Centric
FC Groningen	Groningen	(Netherlands) Ron Jans		Klupp	Noord Lease
SC Heerenveen	Heerenveen	(Norway) Trond Sollied		Jako	Univé
Heracles Almelo	Almelo	(Netherlands) Gert Heerkes		Jako	Koninklijke Ten Cate
NAC Breda	Breda	(Netherlands) Robert Maaskant		Klupp	Sunweb
NEC	Nijmegen	(Netherlands) Mario Been		Nike	Curaçao
PSV	Eindhoven	(Netherlands) Dwight Lodeweges	(Netherlands) Huub Stevens	Nike	Philips
Roda JC	Kerkrade	(Netherlands) / (Belgium) Harm van Veldhoven	(Netherlands) Martin Koopman, (Netherlands) Raymond Atteveld	Diadora	Aevitae
Sparta Rotterdam	Rotterdam	(Netherlands) Foeke Booy		Patrick	Graydon
FC Twente	Enschede	(England) Steve McClaren		Diadora	Arke
FC Utrecht	Utrecht	(Netherlands) Ton du Chatinier	(Netherlands) Willem van Hanegem	Puma	Phanos
Vitesse Arnhem	Arnhem	(Netherlands) Theo Bos	(Netherlands) Hans Westerhof	Legea	AFAB
FC Volendam	Volendam	(Netherlands) Frans Adelaar		Jako	Café Bar
Willem II	Tilburg	(Netherlands) Alfons Groenendijk	(Netherlands) Andries Jonker	Masita	Destil

== League table ==
Pos	Team	Pld	W	D	L	GF	GA	GD	Pts	Qualification or relegation
1	AZ (C)	34	25	5	4	66	22	+44	80	Qualification to Champions League group stage
2	Twente	34	20	9	5	62	31	+31	69	Qualification to Champions League third qualifying round
3	Ajax	34	21	5	8	74	41	+33	68	Qualification to Europa League play-off round
4	PSV	34	19	8	7	71	33	+38	65	Qualification to Europa League third qualifying round
5	Heerenveen	34	17	9	8	66	57	+9	60	Qualification to Europa League play-off round (Note: Heerenveen qualified for the play-off round of the UEFA Europa League 2009–10 by winning the 2008–09 KNVB Cup.)
6	Groningen	34	17	5	12	53	36	+17	56	Qualification to European competition play-offs
7	Feyenoord	34	12	9	13	54	46	+8	45	Qualification to European competition play-offs
8	NAC Breda (O)	34	13	6	15	44	54	−10	45	Qualification to European competition play-offs
9	Utrecht	34	11	11	12	41	44	−3	44	Qualification to European competition play-offs
10	Vitesse Arnhem	34	11	10	13	41	48	−7	43	
11	NEC	34	9	15	10	41	40	+1	42	
12	Willem II	34	10	7	17	35	58	−23	37	
13	Sparta Rotterdam	34	9	8	17	46	66	−20	35	
14	ADO Den Haag	34	8	8	18	41	58	−17	32	
15	Heracles	34	7	11	16	35	53	−18	32	
16	Roda JC (O)	34	7	9	18	38	58	−20	30	Qualification to relegation play-offs
17	De Graafschap (R)	34	7	9	18	24	58	−34	30	Qualification to relegation play-offs
18	Volendam (R)	34	7	8	19	38	67	−29	29	Relegation to the Eerste Divisie

Source: ESPN Eredivisie Table
Rules for classification: 1) points; 2) goal difference; 3) number of goals scored.
(C) Champions; (O) Play-off winners; (R) Relegated

== Results ==
Home \ Away	ADO	AJX	AZ	FEY	GRA	GRO	HEE	HER	NAC	NEC	PSV	RJC	SPA	TWE	UTR	VIT	VOL	WIL
ADO Den Haag		1–1	3–0	2–3	1–0	0–1	0–1	2–2	1–1	3–0	0–2	1–1	1–2	1–2	0–0	3–1	2–0	0–1
Ajax	3–0		1–1	2–0	3–0	1–0	0–1	2–2	3–0	2–0	4–1	1–0	5–2	1–0	1–1	3–0	2–1	7–0
AZ	4–1	2–0		0–0	2–0	3–0	3–1	2–0	1–2	1–0	1–0	1–0	6–0	3–0	2–0	1–2	3–0	3–1
Feyenoord	3–1	2–2	0–1		1–3	0–0	2–2	5–1	3–1	0–2	1–0	2–3	1–0	1–0	5–2	2–2	5–0	1–1
De Graafschap	2–0	0–6	0–2	0–2		0–1	2–0	1–0	0–2	2–2	0–3	1–1	3–3	2–2	0–2	1–0	2–2	1–0
Groningen	3–0	1–0	0–2	3–1	3–0		2–3	2–0	1–0	2–0	0–1	2–0	3–0	1–4	2–0	2–3	5–0	0–0
Heerenveen	2–2	5–2	3–3	3–1	2–0	2–1		2–2	3–1	2–1	2–2	2–0	5–1	1–1	3–2	0–2	1–0	3–1
Heracles	3–1	1–3	0–2	3–1	0–0	1–1	1–1		4–0	1–1	0–2	2–0	2–1	1–2	1–1	0–0	1–1	1–0
NAC Breda	0–4	0–3	0–1	1–2	0–1	1–0	4–2	3–0		1–1	2–1	1–0	3–1	0–1	1–1	2–0	1–1	1–3
NEC	0–0	2–4	0–1	1–0	2–0	2–2	1–1	1–1	2–3		1–0	1–1	1–1	1–1	1–2	3–1	6–1	0–0
PSV Eindhoven	6–0	6–2	2–2	1–0	3–0	4–2	2–3	4–0	2–2	1–1		2–3	1–0	0–0	2–0	2–0	1–0	2–0
Roda JC	2–0	1–2	0–2	0–4	3–1	2–5	2–2	3–1	0–3	3–0	1–1		0–1	1–1	0–0	3–0	1–1	0–1
Sparta Rotterdam	2–5	4–0	0–2	2–1	0–0	1–1	4–1	1–0	4–0	0–2	0–2	2–2		1–2	1–0	0–0	4–0	0–1
Twente	1–0	0–2	3–0	1–1	3–0	2–1	6–0	2–0	4–1	1–1	1–1	4–2	6–2		0–0	2–1	2–1	2–0
Utrecht	3–1	0–2	0–1	2–2	3–0	0–1	2–1	2–0	0–0	0–2	1–5	3–1	3–3	3–0		4–0	0–0	1–0
Vitesse Arnhem	3–1	4–1	1–1	1–1	0–0	0–4	1–0	1–0	0–3	0–0	1–1	3–0	1–1	0–2	6–1		3–1	2–2
Volendam	0–1	1–2	0–2	2–1	3–1	0–1	2–3	3–1	2–4	1–1	3–5	3–1	3–0	1–2	0–0	1–0		2–2
Willem II	3–3	2–1	2–5	1–0	1–1	3–0	1–3	0–3	2–0	1–2	0–3	2–1	3–2	0–2	0–2	0–2	1–2	

Source: Eredivisie.nl (in Dutch)
Legend: Blue = home team win; Yellow = draw; Red = away team win.

== Top goalscorers ==
Pos.	Player	Club	Goals
1	(Morocco) Mounir El Hamdaoui	AZ	23
2	(Uruguay) Luis Suárez	Ajax	22
3	(Sweden) Marcus Berg	Groningen	17
4	(Netherlands) Roy Makaay	Feyenoord	16
4	(Croatia) Danijel Pranjić	Heerenveen	16
4	(Switzerland) Blaise N'Kufo	Twente	16
7	(Netherlands) Frank Demouge	Willem II	14
8	(Netherlands) Ibrahim Afellay	PSV	13
9	(Ghana) Matthew Amoah	NAC Breda	12
9	(Austria) Marko Arnautović	Twente	12
Total:			870
Games:			306
Average:			2.84

Last updated: 11 May 2009
Source: ESPN Top Scorers

== Play-offs ==
=== European competition (best of 3) ===
Contrary to the play-offs of previous years, only teams placed 6th through 9th compete in a play-off tournament for one spot in the second qualifying round of the UEFA Europa League 2009–10.

==== Semi-finals ====
Team 1	Pts	Team 2	1st leg	2nd leg	3rd leg
Utrecht	3–7	Groningen	3–3	0–4	not played
NAC Breda	7–2	Feyenoord	3–2	4–0	not played

==== Final ====
Team 1	Pts	Team 2	1st leg	2nd leg	3rd leg
NAC Breda	3–1	Groningen	1–1	2–0	not played

=== Relegation ===
The 16th and 17th placed teams, along with the teams from Eerste Divisie, participate in a play-off for two spots in 2009–10 Eredivisie.

==== Round 1 ====
Team 1	Agg.	Team 2	1st leg	2nd leg
Telstar	0–1	MVV	0–0	0–1
TOP Oss	0–3	Dordrecht	0–2	0–1

==== Round 2 (best of 3) ====
Team 1	Pts	Team 2	1st leg	2nd leg	3rd leg
MVV	1–4	De Graafschap	2–3	2–2	not played
Excelsior	1–4	RKC Waalwijk	1–2	1–1	not played
FC Zwolle	3–6	Cambuur	2–1	1–3	0–2
Dordrecht	1–4	Roda JC	1–1	0–1	not played

==== Round 3 (best of 3) ====
Team 1	Pts	Team 2	1st leg	2nd leg	3rd leg
RKC Waalwijk	6–3	De Graafschap	2–0	1–2	1–0
Cambuur	3–3 (p. 1–3)	Roda JC	0–0	1–1	2–2 (aet)

RKC Waalwijk and Roda JC will play in Eredivisie 2009–10.

== Facts and statistics ==
- Ajax lost the opening match 2–1 away at Willem II. This was Ajax' first opening round defeat since the 1988–89 season.
- Ajax and Feyenoord both lost their opening matches. The last times this happened was in the 1965–66 season.
- ADO Den Haag topped the league table after two matches. The last time ADO was in first place was on 16 January 1971.
- NAC Breda led the Eredivisie after round six. This was the first time in club history that NAC were in first place of the Eredivisie.
- A record 6,067,288 spectators passed through the turnstiles, an average of 19,827 per match.

== Television rights ==
The Dutch public broadcaster NOS broadcast the match highlights after beating rival broadcaster RTL for the contract. The new pay-per-view channel Eredivisie Live broadcast the live matches.

In Australia the Eredivisie was broadcast live and exclusive by Setanta Sports.

== Awards ==
=== Annual awards ===
Award	Winner	Club
Dutch Footballer of the Year / Gouden Schoen	(Morocco) Mounir El Hamdaoui	AZ
Johan Cruyff Trophy	(Netherlands) Eljero Elia	FC Twente
Rinus Michels Award	(Netherlands) Louis van Gaal	AZ
Eredivisie top scorer	(Morocco) Mounir El Hamdaoui	AZ

=== Team of the season ===
Team of the Season
Goalkeeper	(Argentina) Sergio Romero (AZ)			
Defenders	(Netherlands) Ronnie Stam (FC Twente)	(Sweden) Andreas Granqvist (FC Groningen)	(Belgium) Jan Vertonghen (Ajax)	(Netherlands) Edson Braafheid (FC Twente)
Midfielders	(Netherlands) Demy de Zeeuw (AZ)		(Netherlands) Ibrahim Afellay (PSV)	(Belgium) Maarten Martens (AZ)
Forwards	(Uruguay) Luis Suárez (Ajax)		(Morocco) Mounir El Hamdaoui (AZ)	(Netherlands) Eljero Elia (FC Twente)

== Attendances ==
No.	Club	Average	Change	Highest
1	AFC Ajax	49,014	-0,2%	51,128
2	Feyenoord	44,015	-1,4%	48,000
3	PSV	33,218	-0,9%	35,000
4	sc Heerenveen	25,618	1,6%	26,100
5	FC Twente	23,292	76,7%	24,000
6	FC Groningen	21,862	13,1%	22,160
7	FC Utrecht	20,612	1,2%	24,000
8	SBV Vitesse	17,935	-9,6%	24,760
9	NAC Breda	16,730	6,6%	17,524
10	AZ	16,442	0,1%	17,149
11	Roda JC	14,495	-2,8%	17,910
12	Willem II	13,256	1,8%	14,700
13	NEC	12,312	1,3%	12,500
14	De Graafschap	12,094	-0,3%	12,600
15	ADO Den Haag	10,952	114,0%	14,993
16	Sparta Rotterdam	10,428	2,4%	10,894
17	Heracles Almelo	8,459	0,7%	8,500
18	FC Volendam	5,471	93,3%	6,260

== See also ==
- 2008–09 Eerste Divisie
- 2008–09 KNVB Cup
