= 1930 in association football =

The following are the football (soccer) events of the year 1930 throughout the world.

== Winners club national championship ==
- Denmark: B93
- Greece: Panathinaikos
- Italy: Internazionale Milano F.C.
- Hungary: Újpest FC
- Poland: Cracovia
- Spain: Athletic Bilbao
- Argentina: Boca Juniors
- England: The Wednesday
- Scotland: Rangers

== International tournaments ==
- 1930 British Home Championship (October 19, 1929 – April 5, 1930)

England

- I. Dr. Gerö Cup (September 18, 1927 – May 11, 1930)

Italy

- FIFA World Cup in Uruguay (July 13 – 30 1930)
  1. Uruguay
  2. Argentina
- Baltic Cup 1930 in Lithuania (August 15–17, 1930)

Lithuania

- 1929-32 Nordic Football Championship (June 14, 1929 – September 25, 1932)
  1930: (June 1 - September 28, 1930)

Denmark (1930)
Norway (1929-1932)

- Coupe des Nations in Geneva, Switzerland (June 28 – July 6, 1930)
  1. Újpest FC (Hungary)
  2. SK Slavia Praha (Czechoslovakia)
  3. First Vienna FC (Austria)

== Births ==
- January 9 – Igor Netto, Soviet international footballer (died 1999)
- January 27 – Carlos Cecconato, Argentinian footballer (died 2018)
- March 7 – Harold Greetham, English professional footballer (died 2018)
- March 14 – Hugh Baird, Scottish international footballer (died 2006)
- March 14 – Bora Kostić, Yugoslavian international footballer (died 2011)
- March 25 – Robert Mouynet, French footballer
- March 26 – Sigge Parling, Swedish international footballer (died 2016)
- April 7 – William Freeburn, Scottish footballer (died 2019)
- April 29 – Henri Coppens, Belgian international footballer and coach (died 2015)
- May 18 – Shyqyri Rreli, Albanian international footballer and manager (died 2019)
- May 28 – Brian Johnson, English professional footballer (died 2013)
- June 7 – Hilderaldo Bellini, Brazilian international footballer (died 2014)
- June 25
  - Vic Keeble, English footballer (died 2018)
  - George Thomas, Welsh footballer (died 2014)
- June 26 – Tan Ling Houw, Indonesian Olympicfootballer
- June 28 – José Artetxe, Spanish international footballer (died 2016)
- July 3
  - José Luis Lamadrid, Mexican forward (died 2021)
  - Ferdinando Riva, Swiss forward (died 2014)
- July 7 – Tadao Kobayashi, Japanese football player and manager
- July 9 – Stuart Williams, Welsh international footballer (died 2013)
- July 10 – Tommy Ritchie, Northern Irish professional footballer (died 2017)
- July 15 – Alberto Michelotti, Italian football player and referee (died 2022)
- August 22 – Gylmar dos Santos Neves, Brazilian international footballer (died 2013)
- August 23 – Luís Morais, Brazilian football international footballer (died 2020)
- September 7 – Julio Abbadie, Uruguayan international footballer (died 2014)
- October 19 – Denys Jones, Welsh footballer (died 2003)
- October 28 – Svatopluk Pluskal, Czech international footballer (died 2005)
- November 5 – Wim Bleijenberg, Dutch international footballer (died 2016)
- November 8 – Suat Mamat, Turkish international footballer (died 2016)
- November 26 – Jacques Foix, French international footballer (died 2017)
- December 17 – Gerard Kerkum, Dutch footballer and club chairman (died 2018)
- December 19 –
  - John Bone, English professional footballer (died 2002)
  - Georg Stollenwerk, German international footballer and trainer (died 2014)

== Deaths ==
30 July: Joan Gamper (Hans Max Gamper-Haessig), Swiss athlete and founder of FC Barcelona, 52 (suicide)
