= History of Feyenoord =

The history of Feyenoord, a Dutch football club formed in 1908, is among the longest and most successful in Dutch football. The club won their first national championship in 1924 and over nearly a century have won thirty major trophies. Feyenoord is based in the city of Rotterdam.

== 1908–1939 ==
First logo using the name Feijenoord (1912)

The football club Wilhelmina was founded in the pub De Vereeniging (pub owner was Jac. Keizer) on 19 July 1908 and played in blue-sleeved red shirts and white shorts. The club changed its name to Hillesluise Football Club in 1909 and joined the Rotterdamse Voetbalbond (Rotterdam Football Association). As the league already included a team known as HFC (present-day Koninklijke HFC, based in Haarlem) Hillesluise underwent another name change to become RVV Celeritas.

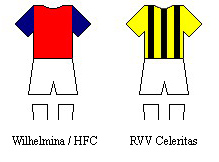
Wilhelmina/HFC and RVV Celeritas kits

The renamed club took new colours, playing in yellow and black striped shirts and white shorts. Celeritas earned promotion to the National football association in 1912, leading to another name change as another, different Celeritas already played there. The team then took the name SC Feijenoord, after the city district in which the team was founded and again changed uniform; the club adopted the red and white shirts, black shorts and black socks they still wear today. In 1917 Feijenoord were promoted to the 1e klasse (1st division) and moved to the ground Kromme Zandweg.

Logo in 1924

Sixteen years after the formation of the club and a mere three years after they were promoted for the second time to the highest level of Dutch football Feijenoord earned their first honours by capturing the national league championship in 1924. The team enjoyed a string of successes in the latter half of the decade, taking divisional titles in 1926, 1927, 1928 and 1929, and winning their second national championship in 1928.

Feijenoord won their first Dutch Cup in 1930 by scoring the only goal in a derby final against Excelsior Rotterdam. They continued to dominate their division with three consecutive titles, but were winless in subsequent championship finals. Five years after their first cup win, Feijenoord took the prize for a second time in 1935 by beating Helmond Sport.

Feijenoord started to attract more fans to their stadium at Kromme Zandweg, so in 1933 a decision to build a new facility was taken. With the help of businessman Daniël George van Beuningen property was purchased next to the Kreekweg for the construction of a new ground. Rotterdam architect L.C. van der Vlugt designed a stadium that was unique in Europe at that time, an oval stadium comprising two platforms where the second platform overhung the first. Fans visiting the stadium were close to the pitch, but their views were obstructed by poles. Construction of the stadium started on 23 July 1935 and Feijenoord's first match in the new Feijenoord Stadion (nicknamed "De Kuip" or "the Tub") was played on 27 March 1937. Leen Vente became the first player to score a goal in the new stadium in a 5–2 victory over Belgian club Beerschot. A few months later the first international match was played between the national teams of the Netherlands and Belgium, won 1–0 by the Dutch.

During this period Feijenoord won three consecutive division titles from 1936 to 1938, with their third and fourth national championships coming in 1936 and 1938.

== 1940–1969 ==
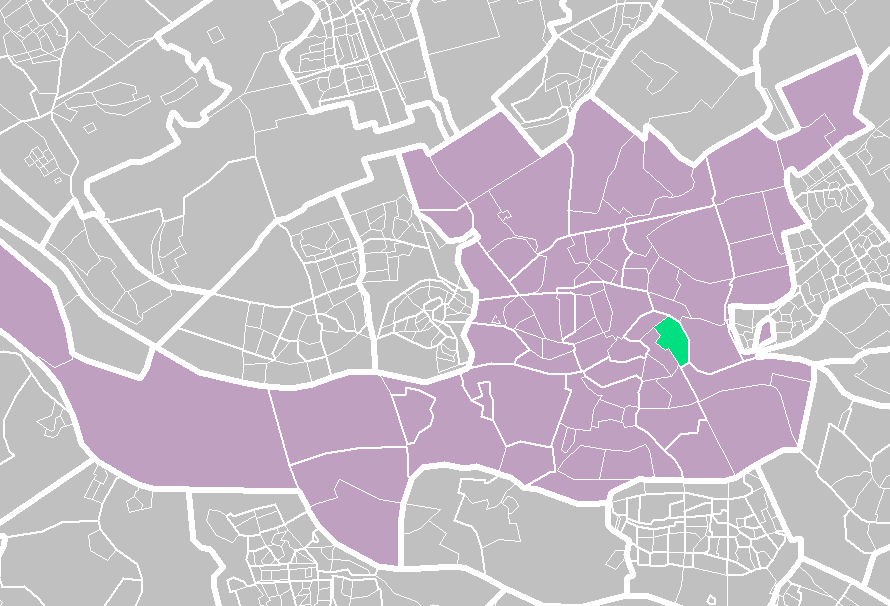
Location of Feijenoord district

During World War II Feijenoord played their matches at Sparta Rotterdam's Sparta Stadion Het Kasteel, as the Nazis had occupied De Kuip. When Het Kasteel was unavailable due to clashes with Sparta fixtures, Feijenoord played at their former ground, the Kromme Zandweg.

Feijenoord's again won a division title with a national championship in 1940, their fifth Dutch title. During the German occupation of the Netherlands from 1940 to 1945 play continued in Dutch football leagues, though the 1945 championship was cancelled as the war came to its conclusion. During this period Feijenoord did not win any trophies other than a divisional championship in 1943. After the war Feijenoord did not perform as well as they had in previous decades, not seriously challenging in their division and so missing the national playoff rounds. More generally, the war had a devastating effect on the city and its citizens and there seemed to be less enthusiasm for football.

With the city of Rotterdam still rebuilding after the war the club was unable to compete for trophies. Feijenoord's chairman Cor Kieboom organised a meeting on 30 June 1954 in Utrecht together with the chairman of the other Rotterdam teams, Jos Coler (Sparta) and Henk van Zon (Excelsior). At the meeting several chairmen of other clubs showed up as well as a delegation of the KNVB to discuss the start of professional football in the Netherlands. Despite the presence of several sceptics, Kieboon pushed the idea of professionalism through, resulting in the first Eredivisie season in 1954/1955. Feijenoord was one of the clubs participating in the inaugural Eredivisie and have never been relegated. One of the most memorable matches in these first years of professional football was the clash between Feijenoord and De Volewijckers at 2 April 1956, which Feijenoord won 11–4 with nine goals by Henk Schouten. He even scored a tenth time, but this goal was disallowed. The first memorable Klassieker from a Feijenoord point of view took place at 11 November 1956 when Daan den Bleijker scored four times to give Feijenoord a 7–3 win over their arch rivals. On 27 November 1957 46,000 supporters travelled to De Kuip for the first match at night in the stadium. In a match against Bolton Wanderers FC, which was lost 3–0 Feijenoord introduced their newly built floodlight system.

Feijenoord claimed their first professional Eredivisie Championship and their sixth Dutch Championship in history in 1961. On the road to the title Ajax were beaten 9–5 in De Kuip, four of Feijenoord's goals were scored by Henk Schouten. The following season, they played their first European Cup match facing IFK Göteborg. The Swedes were beaten 0–3 in Gothenburg and 8–2 in Rotterdam. Feijenoord were eliminated by Tottenham Hotspur in the following round. In 1962 Feijenoord successfully defended their Dutch Championship title and reached the final of the Intertoto Cup 1961-62 by beating SK Hradec Králové and FC Baník Ostrava in the quarter and semi-finals. Feijenoord faced arch-rivals Ajax in the final, which was won by the Amsterdam team 4–2.

On 12 December 1962 Feyenoord played a decisive match versus Vasas SC in the second round of the European Cup 1962-63. The first two legs, in Rotterdam and Budapest both ended in 1–0 home victories, and a replay on a neutral ground took place. The match was played in Antwerp, Belgium and 30,000 Feijenoord fans travelled by bus to see their team play. For the third time the final score was 1–0, with the only goal scored by Rinus Bennaars who was immediately nicknamed "The hero of Deurne" (the neighbourhood in Antwerp where the match was played). The events in Antwerp resulted in an enduring friendly relationship between the fans of Feyenoord and Royal Antwerp FC.

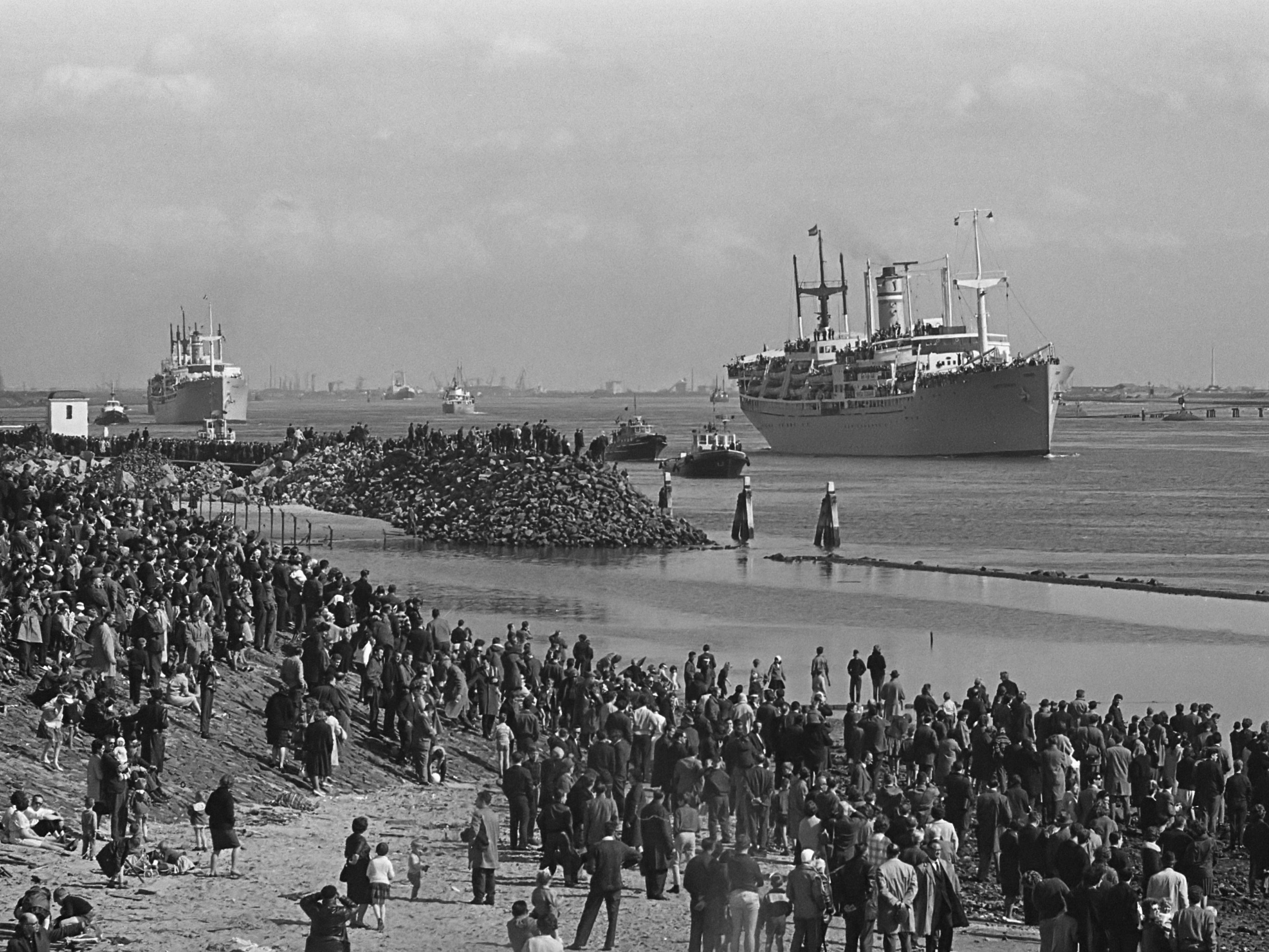
The Waterman and the SS Groote Beer at Hook of Holland with fans for Lisbon (1963)

In 1963 hundreds of thousands of people stood ashore by the Nieuwe Maas and the Nieuwe Waterweg to wave two ships, the SS Groote Beer and the Waterman goodbye. The ships transported thousands of Feijenoord fans to Lisbon where the club faced S.L. Benfica on 8 May 1963 in the European Cup semi-finals. The first leg, held in Rotterdam a month earlier, finished 0–0. Feijenoord eventually lost the match against Benfica 3–1, but this turned out to be the start of the most successful period in the club's history. Feijenoord won the double for the first time in their history in 1965 and managed to win another double a few years later in 1969. The 1965 title secured Feijenoord a spot in the European Cup 1965-66 where they faced multiple cup champions Real Madrid on 8 September 1965 in the preliminaries. During the match Hans Kraay had to leave the pitch injured after 31 minutes, without being substituted. He returned at the start of the second half and scored the goal which resulted in a 2–1 win. Later during the match fans' favourite Coen Moulijn was attacked roughly by a Spanish defender. Moulijn then chased the defender all over the pitch. Several other players did the same, as did some fans who entered the pitch. The referee could do nothing but suspend the match at 2–1 in Feijenoord's favour. Two weeks later Real comfortably beat Feyenoord 5–0, and eventually won the European Cup that season.

== 1970–1999 ==
As the 1969 Dutch champions Feijenoord participated in the European Cup 1969-70. After thrashing Knattspyrnufélag Reykjavíkur 16–2 on aggregate in the first round the team faced AC Milan. Feijenoord lost the first leg 1–0 in Italy, but overcame the deficit in their own stadium following a 2–0 win, securing a place in the quarter-finals where they faced Vorwärts Berlin.

The tie followed the same pattern as the previous round, Feijenoord losing the first match 1–0 away, then winning 2–0 at home. In the semi-finals Legia Warszawa were beaten 2–0 on aggregate, earning Feijenoord their first European final. Ajax had reached the same final in 1969 but were not able to win. Feijenoord faced Celtic in the final, held in the San Siro stadium in Milan. Goals by Tommy Gemmell and Rinus Israël resulted in a 1–1 draw after 90 minutes. Three minutes before the end of the extra time Ove Kindvall scored Feijenoord's winning goal to make them the first Dutch team to claim a major European trophy.

As the cup holders Feijenoord participated in the European Cup 1970-71 despite relinquishing the Dutch title, which was won by Ajax. Feijenoord were eliminated in the first round following a surprise defeat by Romanian team UT Arad. However, as reigning European champions Feijenoord faced Estudiantes La Plata in the Intercontinental Cup. The first match in Buenos Aires' La Bombonera finished in a 2–2 draw. Back in Rotterdam Feijenoord managed a 1–0 victory (winning goal by Joop van Daele) to win the world club crown, the first Dutch team to do so. Estudiantes player Oscar Malbernat got frustrated and grabbed Van Daele's glasses and trampled on it. "You are not allowed to play with glasses." was his excuse, "At least not in South America." In 1971 Feijenoord won their 10th Dutch Championship.

In 1973 the club decided to change their name to Feyenoord, as people from outside the Netherlands found it difficult to pronounce the "ij" in Feijenoord. Under their new name they played in the UEFA Cup 1973-74, reaching the final following a 4–3 aggregate win over VfB Stuttgart in the semi-finals. The opponent in the final was Tottenham Hotspur. In the first leg at White Hart Lane Spurs took a 2–1 lead, but Theo de Jong equalised after 85 minutes and the match ended in a 2–2 draw. Feyenoord then won their match in Rotterdam 2–0 thanks to goals by Wim Rijsbergen and Peter Ressel, and became the first Dutch team to win the UEFA Cup. As a result, Spurs fans started to riot, introducing Dutch football to the spectre of hooliganism in the process. In the remainder of the decade Feyenoord won only one more honour, the Dutch Championship in 1974. In 1978 the club divided their professional and amateur sides to form two separate teams, Feyenoord for professionals and Sportclub Feyenoord for amateurs.

Feyenoord won their fifth Dutch Cup in 1980 by beating Ajax 3–1 in the final.

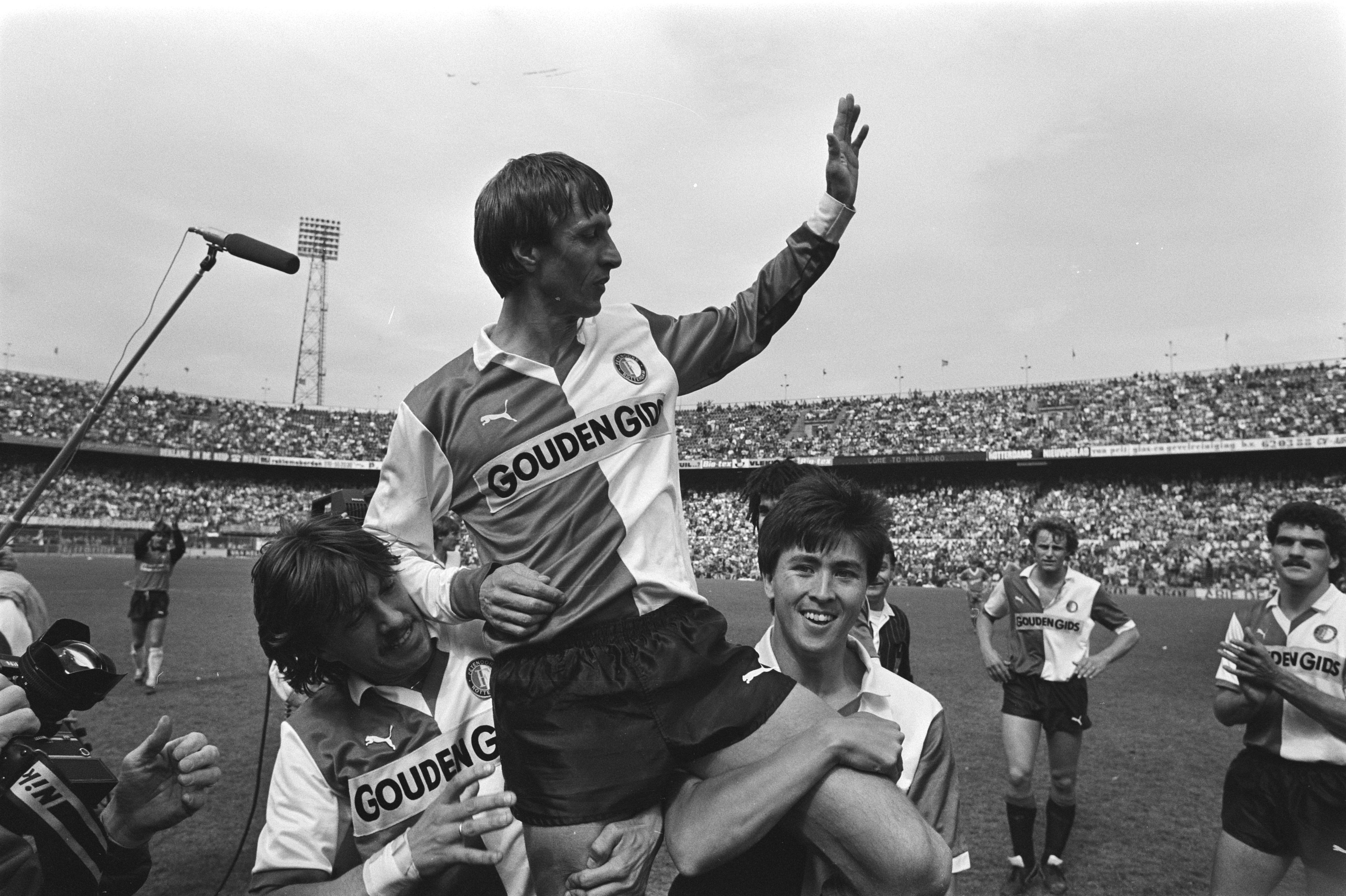
Johan Cruyff with Feyenoord in 1984

In 1984 Feyenoord had another bright season, winning the double for the third time in their history. Key players in the squad from this period included Johan Cruyff, Ruud Gullit and Peter Houtman (who later became the Feyenoord stadium announcer). Cruyff reacted to Ajax's decision not to offer him a new contract at the start of the season and signed for arch rivals Feyenoord instead. Cruyff's move to Rotterdam was criticised and increased Ajax's motivation to beat Feyenoord. In the Olympic Stadium of Amsterdam Feyenoord suffered their heaviest ever defeat: 8–2. However, Feyenoord later defeated Ajax in Rotterdam 4–1 and Ajax were subsequently beaten a second time in the Dutch Cup. Feyenoord proceeded to win a league and cup double by beating Fortuna Sittard in the cup final.

After the successful season Feyenoord experienced a lean period and were unable to finish the season in a higher position than third. In 1989/1990 the club struggled to remain in the Eredivisie, but eventually managed to avoid relegation. The club had financial problems, the staff was unable to recover and their main sponsor HCS went bankrupt.

When Wim Jansen was appointed as the interim manager to replace Günder Bengtsson and Pim Verbeek after a 6–0 defeat against PSV, the outlook began to improve for the club. PSV, the strongest Dutch club of the period, were knocked out of the KNVB Cup by a Henk Fräser goal in Eindhoven. Feyenoord, progressed to the 1991 final, where they beat BVV Den Bosch 1–0 to win the competition. As the cup holders they faced champions PSV again, this time in the 1991 Dutch Supercup, the first Supercup held since 1949. PSV were beaten 1–0 by a Marian Damaschin goal to add another honour to the club's achievements. They went on to win another Dutch Cup in 1992, beating Roda JC 3–0 in the final. The same year Feyenoord reached the semi-finals in the UEFA Cup Winners' Cup 1991-92 beating Tottenham Hotspur in the quarter-final before being knocked out by AS Monaco on away goals after two draws.

In 1993 Feyenoord secured another Dutch Championship by beating FC Groningen 5–0 in the last league match of the season. The match was played at the Oosterpark Stadion in Groningen, so 40.000 Feyenoord fans watched the game on giant screens in De Kuip. The title was followed by another two Dutch Cups in 1994 (beating NEC Nijmegen (2-1)) and 1995 (beating FC Volendam (2-1)). During the UEFA Cup Winners' Cup 1994-95 Feyenoord reached the quarter-finals after beating SV Werder Bremen in the second round. They eventually lost to Real Zaragoza. In the quarter-final in the 1995 KNVB Cup Feyenoord visited Ajax, the team that would win the UEFA Champions League 1994-95 later that season. Ajax was leading 1–0 when Ruud Heus equalised with a penalty just before time. In the extra time Feyenoord became the only team to beat Ajax the season they won the Eredivisie and the Champions League unbeaten. The goal scored by Mike Obiku was the decider as the new golden goal rule became in use. During the UEFA Cup Winners' Cup 1995-96 Everton FC and Borussia Mönchengladbach were beaten. A total of 14,000 Feyenoord fans travelled to Germany to support the team against Mönchengladbach. Feyenoord were knocked out in the semi-finals by a Carsten Jancker inspired SK Rapid Wien.

Logo used from 1997 until 2008

Feyenoord made their UEFA Champions League debut during the UEFA Champions League 1997-98, finishing third in their group behind Manchester United and Juventus, however Juventus were beaten 2–0 in Rotterdam, both goals scored by Julio Ricardo Cruz. In 1998 the Fiscal Intelligence and Investigation Service (FIOD) visited Feyenoord because of suspected fraud. Mainly based on the signings of Aurelio Vidmar, Christian Gyan and Patrick Allotey. This became an ongoing scandal in the years to come with chairman Jorien van den Herik as the main suspect. On 25 April 1999 Feyenoord secured their 14th Dutch Championship. 250,000 fans celebrated with the team in the center of Rotterdam. However, later in the evening heavy rioting started. Before the start of the new 1999/2000 season Ajax were beaten in their own stadium when Feyenoord won their second Dutch Supercup after a free kick by Patrick Paauwe who secured a 3–2 win.

== Recent history ==
During the UEFA Champions League 1999-00 Feyenoord participated in the UEFA Champions League for the second time. This time the club managed to finish second in their group behind Rosenborg, but in front of Borussia Dortmund. Feyenoord reached the second group stage and secured wins versus Olympique Marseille (at home) and S.S. Lazio (away). Chelsea FC won both clashes and as a result Feyenoord had to win their last group match away to Marseille to reach the knock-out stages. The final result was 0–0 and Feyenoord were eliminated.

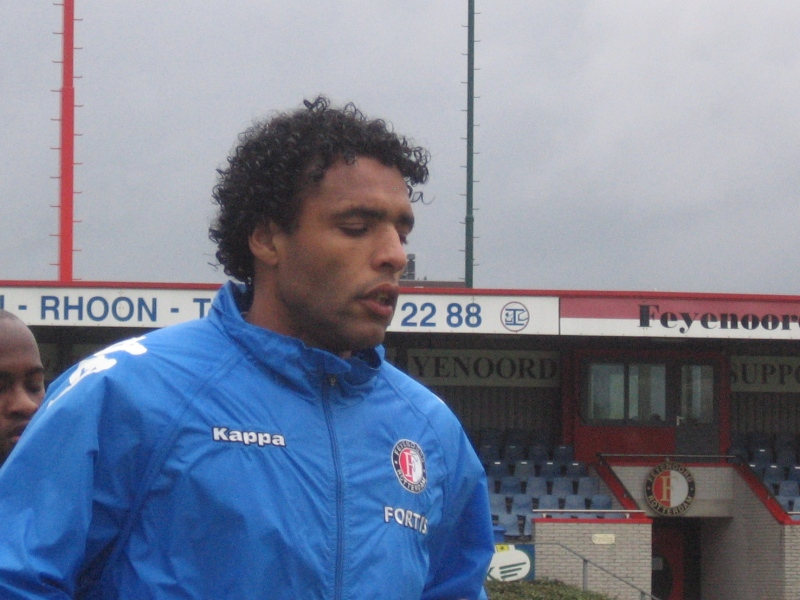
Pierre van Hooijdonk in 2007

Feyenoord again participated in the Champions League in 2001-02, finishing third in a group containing FC Bayern Munich, Sparta Prague and FC Spartak Moscow. This meant Feyenoord had to continue their European season in the UEFA Cup 2001-02 instead of the 2nd Champions League group stage. The disappointment of failing to reach the second group stage eventually resulted in optimism and celebration. By winning over SC Freiburg and Rangers, Feyenoord faced fellow Dutch team PSV in the quarter-finals. Both matches ended in 1–1 draws, and the clash went into extra time and a penalty shoot-out. Pierre van Hooijdonk who had a superb season by scoring many goals from free kicks secured Feyenoord's win by scoring in the 90th-minute equalizer before finishing PSV off by scoring the last goal in the penalty shoot-out. A win in Milan (0-1) over Inter and a 2–2 return match in Rotterdam earned Feyenoord their spot in the final, in which Borussia Dortmund was the opponent. The final was held in De Kuip and as a result most spectators inside the stadium were Feyenoord fans. Feyenoord took a 2–0 lead thanks to another free kick and a penalty by Pierre van Hooijdonk. Early in the second half Jan Koller scored a goal to make it 2–1. Jon Dahl Tomasson then made it 3–1 and things looked good for Feyenoord. Dortmund only managed to score one more goal and the cup was won by Bert van Marwijk's Feyenoord.

A huge party erupted in and outside De Kuip not only because of the title, but also because the final was held several days after Rotterdam's political hero Pim Fortuyn was murdered. Many fans were still upset before and after the match. As a result of Fortuyn's murder, the cup was not officially celebrated in the city center. Feyenoord hasn't won any further honours since the 2002 UEFA Cup win. They reached the final of the Dutch Cup in 2003, held in De Kuip, but were not able to beat FC Utrecht, which shocked the club with a 4–1 win. Subsequently, Feyenoord has yet to reach any more finals or to win any more Dutch Championship titles.

In between, Feyenoord and chairman Jorien van den Herik were found to be not guilty in 2002. The Attorney General however appealed, but in 2005, after three years of investigations the results stayed the same. Still, the Attorney General has not given up the case yet.

The 2005/06 season ended in disappointment for Feyenoord. The team challenged for the Dutch Championship for most of the season, but eventually lost out to PSV. The newly created Dutch play-offs then proved to be gloomy for Feyenoord. Ajax, which finished several points behind in the regular league, was Feyenoord's opponent in the play-offs. Ajax outclassed them and Feyenoord lost out on a Champions League place. During the summer break Feyenoord had to sell two of their key players, Salomon Kalou and the very popular Dirk Kuyt. Only a small amount of the money became available to invest in new players. When Angelos Charisteas was signed from archrivals Ajax to replace Dirk Kuyt hundreds of die-hard fans pressured the Feyenoord board to force Van den Herik to resign.

In the meantime Feyenoord was placed under special guardianship because of their financial problems. In the Eredivisie the team was underperforming and Feyenoord hooligans gave the club a bad name in Europe due to several incidents. Blackburn Rovers midfielder Morten Gamst Pedersen was hit by a plastic beer cup thrown from the crowd during a UEFA Cup match. A few weeks later in Nancy Feyenoord hooligans damaged the city prior to the match versus AS Nancy and during the match they broke through walls of glass, forcing the police to use tear gas, causing a 30-minute suspension of the match.

The UEFA charged Feyenoord at a disciplinary hearing on 7 December 2006., fining the club 130,000 Euros and issuing a suspended penalty of playing two matches behind closed doors. The UEFA appealed and demanded Feyenoord to be excluded from competition and to be suspended for the first upcoming season they qualify for Europe. Van den Herik still remained in function, but the pressure grew. He did not show up at the club anymore and left a lot of questions.

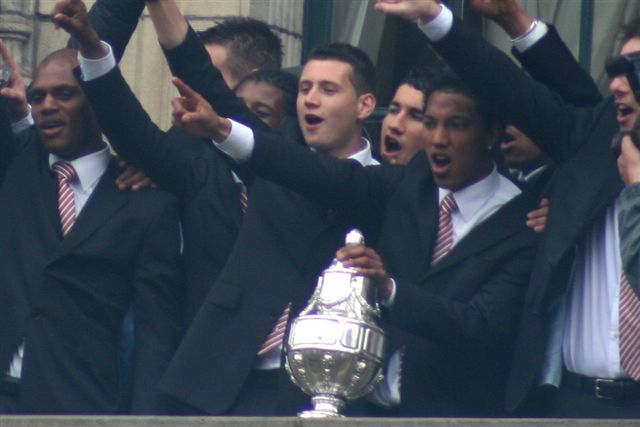
Celebration of winning the KNVB cup in 2008.

A group of some Feyenoord icons, with former chairman Gerard Kerkum as their leader, operated under the name of "Commissie Kerkum" to restructure Feyenoord's future. In December 2006 they published their thoughts and came to the conclusion that Van den Herik should leave the club. Still Van den Herik did not want to leave, but as the decision of the Commissie Kerkum was final he was expected to step back and he announced his retirement in mid December. Van den Herik himself said not the thoughts of the Commissie Kerkum were the key factor for his decision, but the upcoming final result in the fraud case was. The final try of the FIOD in their case against Feyenoord was dismissed on 19 December 2006 and Feyenoord had been cleared from all blame. When this case was closed Van den Herik decided to step back and was temporarily succeeded by Gerard Kerkum himself for the rest of the season, before Dick van Well took over Van den Herik's position. A new start for the team was announced in January 2007, but the start was interrupted a few days later. The results of the UEFA commission considering the story about Feyenoord hooligans in Nancy were made public and Feyenoord was excluded immediately from the UEFA Cup competition. The initial fine was reduced to a smaller fine of 60.000 Euros However, the club chose to appeal against the UEFA decision at the Court of Arbitration for Sport, which announced that a final decision would be rendered by 9 February 2007 at the latest.

Logo during the anniversary year in 2008

In 2008 Feyenoord celebrated her 100th birthday and organized many events throughout the year. The old "golden logo" returned as Feyenoord's official logo, which was presented at the 2007 new years brunch. During the summer a historical tournament was held between Feyenoord and the three opponents they met in the European Cup finals they played, Borussia Dortmund, Tottenham Hotspur and Celtic FC (Feyenoord Jubilee Tournament).

Midway through the season manager Verbeek was sacked because of disappointing league results. His assistant, Leon Vlemmings, then took over the job as manager. The results in this period improved slightly, resulting in securing a spot in the playoffs for the final Dutch Europa League slot.

For the 2009–10 season, Feyenoord appointed former assistant manager and Feyenoord footballer Mario Been to take over from Leon Vlemmings. Been, after achieving minor European successes with NEC Nijmegen, was considered the ideal man for the job. Former manager Leo Beenhakker, at that time manager of the Polish national squad, took over the role as Technical Director. Partly because of this position, he was able to attract more investors to the club leading to some unexpected signings, such as Sekou Cissé, Dani Fernández and Stefan Babović.

In mid-January 2011 Leo Beenhakker resigned after multiple clashes between him and the Feyenoord directors. His replacement was former Feyenoord player Martin van Geel, who at the time was working as Technical Director for fellow Eredivisie club Roda JC.

In July 2011, a majority of players in the squad voted to oust Been as club manager. Thirteen out of eighteen players voted that they had lost all confidence in Been's ability to successfully manage the club. Been's subsequent sacking became global news, if only because reports of Been's firing quickly became a trending topic on Twitter, leaving people around the world to wonder who exactly Mario Been was.

After Louis van Gaal turned down an offer to manage Feyenoord, the club sought out legendary former Barcelona defender Ronald Koeman, who had played for Feyenoord during the late nineteen nineties. With his eventual hiring as Feyenoord manager, Koeman became the first to ever serve as both player and head coach at all teams of the so-called "traditional big three" of Dutch football: (AFC Ajax, PSV Eindhoven and Feyenoord itself) Moreover, he played and managed these teams in the same order.

At the beginning of the 2011–12 season, Feyenoord lost valuable players Leroy Fer, Georginio Wijnaldum and André Bahia to FC Twente, PSV Eindhoven and Samsunspor respectively. In return, the club restocked with players such as Jordy Clasie, Miquel Nelom, Guyon Fernandez and Kaj Ramsteijn, who came mostly from their own youth academy. Two other players were loaned, John Guidetti from Manchester City and Otman Bakkal from PSV. Feyenoord started the season well and played the first game of the Eredivisie, against the other Rotterdam club in the league Excelsior. As of March 2012 Feyenoord was in fifth place in the Eredivisie standings, potentially resulting in a Europa League spot for next season.

On 16 December 2011, it was revealed that Feyenoord had been placed in the more favorable second category (Categorie 2). Meaning that Feyenoord were no longer in debt according to the KNVB. They have earned this by the transfer of significant players and a large capital injection made by the organisation VVF (Friends of Feyenoord, Vrienden Van Feyenoord). However to stay in the second category, Feyenoord needed to obtain the same number of points earned rounding up to or higher than 65 points. On 13 April 2012 Feyenoord was officially out of what has been described as the 'financial dangerzone' and was officially placed in the second Category. According to chairman of the club Eric Gudde the placing in the more favourable category came earlier than anticipated, he also congratulated the fans and promised to maintain the same policy until Feyenoord was completely healthy again and will never fall back into the 1st Category.

Despite not having to ask the KNVB for permission to invest in new players anymore, Feyenoord kept continuing the policy for the 2012–13 season, only contracting players that were either out of contract or available for a low transfer fee. John Goossens, Ruud Vormer and Daryl Janmaat were out of contract and signed a deal with Feyenoord over one with their old clubs. Mitchell te Vrede played for the affiliated football club Excelsior, as well as for the highest-ranked academy team Jong Feyenoord/Excelsior and was promoted to the main senior team. Harmeet Singh and Lex Immers are thus far the only two players who Feyenoord paid a transfer fee for. Singh, a Norwegian midfielder and the only non-Eredivisie player joining Feyenoord, was purchased from Vålerenga, while Immers came over from ADO Den Haag.

On July 2, 2012, Karim El Ahmadi completed his transfer from Feyenoord to Premier League club Aston Villa for an undisclosed fee believed to be in the region of €2,600,000. This made him Paul Lambert's first signing as Aston Villa manager, and Aston Villa's second signing of the summer (following Australia international Brett Holman's move from AZ).

On July 15, 2012, supporters of Aston Villa uploaded a picture on Twitter which showed Ron Vlaar, Feyenoord captain since season 2010/2011, visiting the Villa Park stadium in Birmingham. Which had Martin van Geel confirm to the media that Vlaar wanted to leave Feyenoord.

After the incident Villa did not contact Vlaar, to which coach Ronald Koeman set up a deadline for Villa, which ended on July 23, 2012, however Villa was on a pre-season tour of the United States and thus not able to respond. On July 23, 2012, Vlaar told the public that he would not leave Feyenoord after all, and said that he felt that he was kept dangling by Aston Villa.

Four days later however Vlaar told the public that he would eventually be joining Villa, as he had agreed personal terms and would sign for Villa subject to him passing a medical. On August 1, 2012, Vlaar officially joined Aston Villa, signing a three-year contract. Feyenoord supporters received the news generally mixed, with some congratulating and wishing the best of luck, others feeling betrayed by Vlaar for misleading them.

Stefan de Vrij would be taking up the vacant spot for captain, considering his time and experiences with Feyenoord, making Jordy Clasie, who because of his good play and tenacity soon became one of the most popular players among the supporters, vice-captain.

On August 7, Feyenoord had lost the third qualifying round of the Champions League against Dynamo Kyiv in both legs, which would secure a spot in the play-offs. Feyenoord was demoted to the play-off round of the UEFA Europa League. Ronald Koeman has said that Feyenoord was the better side over the two legs but missed a scoring striker, referring to John Guidetti, the loaned player from Manchester City one season earlier.

On August 10, 2012, Dutch-international and Málaga C.F. defender Joris Mathijsen confirmed signing a contract with Feyenoord for three years. Málaga had made clear to Mathijsen that he needed to find a new club to generate income for the financially suffering Málaga after Sheikh Al Thani left. Ronald Koeman has however kept de Vrij as captain, despite Mathijsen being more experienced on international and club level.

After drawing the first leg of the Europa League qualifier at home 2–2 against Sparta Prague, Feyenoord was eliminated following a 2–0 loss in the second leg, meaning Feyenoord would not be playing European football in 2012–13. Following these events, Feyenoord loaned Parma and former AZ striker Graziano Pellè and exchanged Jerson Cabral for Twente striker Wesley Verhoek in a straight player swap. Feyenoord ended the season in third, behind champions Ajax and second-placed PSV. Pellè surprised many after scoring 27 goals in 29 matches, prompting Feyenoord to sign him permanently from Parma on a contract lasting until summer 2017.

In the 2013–14 season, Feyenoord recorded the worst start in its history, losing its first three matches to PEC Zwolle, Twente and Ajax respectively. Feyenoord would recover, but its performances were unstable throughout the season. However, because the Eredivisie's other top teams also played inconsistently, Feyenoord remained in the title race, although it eventually finished second, four points behind Ajax. In the UEFA Europa League, Feyenoord was eliminated in the third qualifying round by Kuban Krasnodar, making it Feyenoord's fifth consecutive season without European football.

On 1 February 2014, Ronald Koeman announced he would be resigning at the end of the season. On 3 March 2014, Fred Rutten was named the new manager for the 2014–15 season.

During the summer of the 2014–15 season, Feyenoord lost four of its best players: Daryl Janmaat to Newcastle United, Stefan de Vrij to Lazio, Bruno Martins Indi to Porto and Graziano Pellè to Southampton, with Southampton having just appointed Koeman as its new manager. To replace them, as well as other departed players, Feyenoord signed Warner Hahn from Dordrecht, Luke Wilkshire from Dynamo Moscow, Khalid Boulahrouz from Brøndby, Bilal Başaçıkoğlu from Heerenveen, Colin Kazim-Richards from Bursaspor, Jens Toornstra from Utrecht, Kenneth Vermeer from Ajax and Karim El Ahmadi from Aston Villa, returning to the club after two years in England.

With new players as well as a new head coach, Feyenoord began the 2014–15 Eredivisie season with just five points after four matches. However, the club was successful in reaching the Europa League group stage for the first time in six years. After losing to Besiktas 5–2 aggregate in the third qualifying round of the Champions League, they defeated Zorya Luhansk in the final qualifying round of the Europa League play-off, 5–4 aggregate.

Feyenoord won with 2–1 against Standard Liège in their first home match in Group G of the Europa League. It was the first victory for Feyenoord in the Europa League group stage in eight years. Feyenoord also beat Rijeka (2–0) and defending champions Sevilla (2–0), results sufficient for Feyenoord's progress to the knockout round for the first time in ten years. In the knockout round, Feyenoord lost to Roma 3–2 on aggregate. After this loss, Feyenoord did not recover. Despite nearly securing a spot in next season's Europa League qualification rounds, they failed to win any of their last five matches, ending the year in the fourth spot, behind AZ. In the play-offs to earn a spot for Europa League, they were eliminated by Heerenveen. After manager Fred Rutten opted not to extend his contract, on 23 March 2015 Feyenoord announced former Dutch international and Feyenoord player Giovanni van Bronckhorst would become its new manager. That summer the club contracted several new key players, Eric Botteghin from FC Groningen, Jan-Arie van der Heijden from Vitesse, and Eljero Elia from SV Werder Bremen. It also welcomed back club legend Dirk Kuyt from Fenerbahçe on a one-year contract.

After eight years without any prizes, Feyenoord won its 12th KNVB Cup on 24 April 2016. In the Eredivisie the team came third, a distance behind Ajax and the champions PSV. That next summer Feyenoord managed to do some good business in the transfer market. The contracts of starting players like Dirk Kuyt and Eljero Elia were extended. Furthermore, it acquired Nicolai Jørgensen from F.C. Copenhagen for €3,500,000 and Brad Jones was contracted on a free transfer from NEC as a replacement for injured first-choice goalkeeper Kenneth Vermeer.

The 2016/2017 season started perfectly, as the first nine league matches were won, and Feyenoord beat Manchester United F.C. 1–0 in the Europe League. That was with a little help from the referee as Nicolai Jørgensen, who gave the assist, was clearly offside. This match, and all of Feyenoord's European home games were played in only a half-full stadium. These measurements were taken to avoid new penalties from the UEFA. In that same week reigning Dutch champions PSV were beaten, 0–1. The first loss of points was against Ajax on 23 October 2016. The final score was 1–1 after the goals of Kasper Dolberg and Dirk Kuyt. A week later another draw followed against SC Heerenveen On 6 November, a weakened team lost for the first time that season; relegation candidate Go Ahead Eagles won, 1-0] In the European campaign Feyenoord struggled, and after losses to Manchester United (4-0)and Fenerbahçe (0-1) the European adventure ended. In the Eredivisie the team booked big victories, such as a 6–1 defeat against Spartaand 0–4 against AZ. With a 5-point lead to second place Ajax, Feyenoord ended the year at the top of the league table.

The second half of the season, Feyenoord started strong, winning the first seven league games of 2017. However, in Arnhem, Vitesse proved to be too strong in the KNVB Cup (2-0). Feyenoord beat PSV at home (2-1)due, to an own goal from PSV-goalkeeper Jeroen Zoet, which was indicated by Goal-line technology. On 5 March, Sparta was the first team to beat Feyenoord in the new year, by a goal in the first minute of the game, scored by Mathias Pogba. Feyenoord recovered quickly and another big win followed when they beat AZ, 5–2, and a week later SC Heerenveen were beat, 2–1. When Feyenoord lost to Ajax, and drew against PEC Zwolle, their lead was decreased to one point. After two more victories from Feyenoord, and a loss for number two Ajax against PSV, the gap was four points with two games to go. One week before the end of the competition, Feyenoord could become champions away at Excelsior, just 4 kilometers from their home stadium, De Kuip, and also in Rotterdam. However the team had a complete off-day and lost, 3–0. One week later, in the final game of the season, the team still became champions by beating Heracles by 3–1. All three goals were made by the team captain, Dirk Kuyt, who would later announce his retirement, making it a 'fairytail' last match on his account. The championship was Feyenoord's 15th and the first in 18 years. Feyenoord was the second team in the history of the Dutch league to stay at the top of the table the entire season. Because of the championship, Feyenoord was to compete for the Johan Cruyff Shield against cup winner Vitesse in the Kuip on 5 August 2017. After a 1–1 tie Feyenoord beat Vitesse by penalties.

As the Dutch champions, Feyenoord qualified directly for the 2017–18 UEFA Champions League group stage. The team was drawn with Manchester City, Shakhtar Donetsk and Napoli, and eventually lost its first 5 matches. However, their last home match – against Napoli – ended in victory, winning 2–1. That same season, Feyenoord was not able to win the Dutch championship again, but won the Dutch Cup after beating AZ 3–0 in the final. The 2018–19 season started with disappointment. Feyenoord qualified for the third qualifying round of the UEFA Europa League by virtue of winning the Dutch Cup. However, Feyenoord was immediately eliminated by AS Trenčín. During the 2018-19 Eredivisie season, Feyenoord was not able to maintain the pace of Ajax and PSV and finished in third place. However, Feyenoord beat both title contenters at home. It was the first loss of PSV after opening with a 13-game winning streak. Also, Feyenoord won against Ajax in historic fashion with 6–2. Ajax got revenge by beating Feyenoord in De Kuip in the semi-final of the Dutch Cup. After the season, head coach Giovanni van Bronckhorst left the club, while star player Robin van Persie retired. Jaap Stam was appointed as the new head coach.

=== New struggles ===
The 2019–20 season started with mixed results. Feyenoord reached the group stage of the Europa League by comfortably beating Dinamo Tbilisi and Hapoel Be'er Sheva. However, in the eredivisie Feyenoord won only 3 of the first 10 matches and found themselves back on 10th place before heading into the Amsterdam for an away game against title holders and league leaders Ajax. After the first half, Ajax lead the game 4–0, which was also the final result. Jaap Stam resigned after the game, after which Dick Advocaat replaced him as headcoach of Feyenoord. With Advocaat as the new head coach, Feyenoord improved, staying undefeated and climbed the table from the 12th to 3rd place and was only six points behind league leaders Ajax and AZ. Furthermore, Feyenoord qualified for the final of the Dutch Cup. However, the Eredivisie was suspended and eventually abandoned due to the outbreak of the COVID-19 pandemic. The ranking when the league was suspended became the final ranking, meaning Feyenoord ended the season in third place, qualifying for the group stage of the 2020-21 Europa League. The cup final was not played.

Feyenoord had a decent start of the 2020-21 Eredivisie season, losing only once after 16 matches. However, Feyenoord was eliminated during the group stage of the Europa League. In the league, Feyenoord found themselves on second place, three points behind league leaders Ajax before playing them in a direct confrontation for the top spot. Ajax won the match 1–0. Feyenoord had a disappointing second half of the season, winning only 6 matches. In the meanwhile, Feyenoord lost 4–3 against SC Heerenveen in the quarter finals of the KNVB cup, despite a 1–3 lead in the second half. Feyenoord finished in fifth place, and had to participate in the play-off tournament to secure a spot in the UEFA Europa Conference League. Feyenoord succeeded, by first beating Sparta and then FC Utrecht, both with 2-0 victories. During the season, it was announced that AZ coach Arne Slot would succeed Dick Advocaat as the head coach of Feyenoord.

=== Arne Slot era: back in title contention and European final ===
For the 2021–22 season, Feyenoord participated in the inaugural edition of the UEFA Europa Conference League. Feyenoord narrowly defeated FC Drita 3–2 in the second qualifying round. But Feyenoord improved, beating FC Luzern 3-0 twice in the third qualifying round and IF Elfsborg 6–3 on aggregate. Feyenoord topped a group with Maccabi Haifa, Union Berlin and Slavia Prague and qualified for the round of 16. Feyenoord defeated Partizan Belgrado 5–2 away and 3–1 at home. In the quarter finals, Feyenoord again played Slavia Prague. After a 3–3 at home, Feyenoord managed to win 1–3 in Prague. In the semi finals, Feyenoord faced Olympique Marseille. The first game in the Kuip was won 3 to 2. In Marseille, Feyenoord managed to hold on to a 0–0 draw. The team managed to reach the final but lost 1–0 to Italian club Roma. In the Eredivisie, Feyenoord improved on the total of the previous season, finishing in third place with 71 points. In the Dutch Cup, Feyenoord was eliminated in the second round after extra time by FC Twente.

After the success in the Conference League, Feyenoord lost a lot of players, including 9 players who played in the Conference League Final. With a new squad, Feyenoord managed to stay in title contention. Only one match was lost in the first half of the season, 4–3 against PSV. During the world cup break, Feyenoord topped the table, 3 points clear of runners up PSV and Ajax. After the world cup break, the form improved. While a few games against other title contenters were drawn, Feyenoord was able to keep hold of the first spot. Feyenoord started a 13-game winning streak, among others booking crucial, late victories against AZ at home and away against Ajax. The win against Ajax was the first win of Feyenoord in an away match against Ajax since 2005. Feyenoord pulled away of the other title contenters and improved to a 8-point lead over numbers 2 PSV. The team secured the title 2 games before the end of the season by winning 3–0 against Go Ahead Eagles. It was the 16th championship win in the history of the club and the first since 2017. Feyenoord was lauded by many experts as the deserved champion, due to their energetic and attacking playing style. In the Europa League, Feyenoord was drawn in a group with FC Midtjylland, Sturm Graz, and S.S. Lazio. All teams ended with 8 points, but Feyenoord finished the group stage in first place by virtue of a superior goal difference. In the round of 16, Feyenoord defeated Shaktar Donetsk 8–2 on aggregate and was drawn to play against AS Roma again in the quarter finals. The first match at home ended with a 1–0 victory. The return match went to extra time and resulted in a 4–1 victory for AS Roma. In the Dutch Cup, Feyenoord was defeated in the semi-finals at home by Ajax, 1–2. Due to the successes and playing style of Feyenoord, there was some serious interest from clubs in Arne Slot, most notably from Tottenham Hotspur. However, after a few weeks of rumours Arne Slot extended his contract, citing he wasn't finished yet at Feyenoord.

Feyenoord started the 2023-24 Eredivisie season slowly. The Johan Cruijff Schaal was lost against PSV 0–1, while the first two league games were drawn. Feyenoord then booked 7 straight victories, including 0–4 against Ajax in Amsterdam. This streak was ended by a loss in Enschede against FC Twente. Feyenoord also lost again at home against PSV 1–2. Despite these setbacks, Feyenoord had more points after 16 matches compared to the previous season. However, as PSV started the season perfectly, winning all their 16 matches, Feyenoord found themselves on second place, 10 points behind their rivals at the winter break. In the 2023–24 UEFA Champions League, Feyenoord was drawn in group with Atletico Madrid, Celtic and again S.S. Lazio. Feyenoord won the home games against Celtic and S.S. Lazio. Despite showing good form and impressing foreign media with their play, Feyenoord failed to pick up a single point in the away matches and at home against Atletico. Feyenoord ended the group stage on third place and qualified for the preliminary round of the 2023–24 UEFA Europa League. Feyenoord was drawn against Roma again. Both matches ended in a 1–1 draw, after which Feyenoord was defeated in a penalty shootout. It was the third consecutive time that Feyenoord's European season was ended by AS Roma.

After the winter break, Feyenoord won 1–0 at home against PSV in the third round of the KNVB-cup. It was the first defeat of PSV against a Dutch opponent in almost a year. Feyenoord played AZ at home in the quarter finals and won 2–0. In the semi-finals, Feyenoord played at home again, this time against Keuken Kampioen Divisie team FC Groningen. Feyenoord won the match 2-1 and advanced to the finals against NEC Nijmegen. In the league, Feyenoord stayed in second place, among others drawing against PSV, 2-2. It was the only time PSV didn't win a home game in the Eredivisie. On April 7, Feyenoord defeated Ajax at home 6–0. It was the biggest defeat of Ajax in a competitive game since the inception of the Eredivisie and the first time Ajax failed to score in both league games against Feyenoord. In the KNVB Cup Final against NEC Nijmegen, Feyenoord won 1–0. It was the 14th cup victory of Feyenoord and the first since 2018. Feyenoord clinched second place and qualification for the group stage of the 2024–25 UEFA Champions League four games before the end of the season by winning 1–3 at Go Ahead Eagles. After this game, Liverpool and Feyenoord reached an agreement that Arne Slot would transfer to Liverpool, succeeding Jurgen Klopp as head coach. Feyenoord outscored PSV in the second half of the season with 5 points, however it was not enough the erase the deficit. Feyenoord remained unbeaten in all competitive matches after the winter break and ended the season with 84 points, one point shy of their highest total in 1973. Coincidentally, in both seasons Feyenoord finished in second place.

Brian Priske, coach of Sparta Prague and born in Denmark, was appointed as the successor of Arne Slot. He is the first foreign head coach at Feyenoord since 1991, when Gunder Bengtsson from Sweden was head coach.
