= George Thomas =

George Thomas may refer to:

== Politicians ==
- Sir George Thomas, 1st Baronet (died 1774), deputy governor of Pennsylvania 1738–1747, governor of the Leeward Islands 1753–1766
- Sir George Thomas, 3rd Baronet (c. 1740–1815), British MP for Arundel
- George M. Thomas (American politician) (1828–1914), U.S. Representative from Kentucky
- George Y. Thomas (1882–1940), Canadian merchant and political figure in Nova Scotia
- George T. Thomas (1856–1920), American Republican politician from Ohio
- George Thomas, 1st Viscount Tonypandy (1909–1997), British Labour Party politician, Speaker of the House of Commons
- George Thomas (Indian politician) (1926–1993), Indian politician
- George M. Thomas (Indian politician) (born 1954), Communist Party of India politician

== Sports ==
- George C. Thomas Jr. (1873–1932), American golf course designer
- Sir George Thomas, 7th Baronet (1881–1972), British chess and badminton player
- George Thomas (halfback) (1928–1989), American football halfback and defensive back
- George Thomas (wide receiver) (born 1964), American football wide receiver
- George Thomas (baseball) (1937–2026), American baseball player
- George Thomas (badminton) (born 1966), Indian badminton player
- George Thomas (canoeist), canoer from New Zealand
- George Thomas (English cricketer) (born 2003)
- George Thomas (Indian cricketer), cricketer from India
- George Thomas (footballer, born 1857) (1857–?), Welsh international footballer
- George Thomas (footballer, born 1930) (1930–2014), Welsh football player for Newport County
- George Thomas (footballer, born 1997), Welsh football player who plays for Queens Park Rangers
- George Thomas (golfer), American golfer
- George Thomas (rugby, born 1881) (1881–1916), rugby union and rugby league footballer of the 1900s and 1910s for Pontnewydd (RU), Newport, Great Britain (RL), Wales, and Warrington
- George Thomas (rugby union, born 1857) (1857–1934), rugby union footballer of the 1880s and 1990s for Wales, and Newport

== Others ==
- George Thomas (soldier) (c. 1756–1802), Irish mercenary, active in 18th century India, also known as the "Irish Raja"
- George Thomas (surveyor) (1781–1850), Royal Navy hydrographic surveyor
- George Henry Thomas (1816–1870), American Civil War general
- George Housman Thomas (1824–1868), English painter and illustrator
- George Thomas (entrepreneur), African-American valet, impresario in Russia under Tsar Nicholas II
- George Holt Thomas (1879–1929), English aviation industry pioneer and newspaper proprietor
- George Washington Thomas (1883–1937), American blues and jazz pianist and songwriter
- George B. Thomas (1914–2006), American mathematician
- George Leo Thomas (born 1950), American Roman Catholic prelate
- George Thomas (educator) (died 1951), American academic administrator
- K. George Thomas (born 1961), Indian photochemist
- George Thomas (air marshal), Indian Air Force officer
- George Geovonni Thomas (born 1983), American criminal convicted of the 2007 kidnapping, rape, and murders of Channon Christian and Christopher Newsom
