= 1930–31 Football League =

39th season of the Football League

The Football League
- Season: 1930–31
- Champions: Arsenal
- Relegated: Nelson, Newport County
- New Team in League: Thames

The 1930–31 season was the 39th season of The Football League.

== Final league tables ==
The tables and results below are reproduced here in the exact form that they can be found at The Rec.Sport.Soccer Statistics Foundation website and in Rothmans Book of Football League Records 1888–89 to 1978–79, with home and away statistics separated.

Beginning with the season 1894–95, clubs finishing level on points were separated according to goal average (goals scored divided by goals conceded), or more properly put, goal ratio. In case one or more teams had the same goal difference, this system favoured those teams who had scored fewer goals. The goal average system was eventually scrapped beginning with the 1976–77 season. From the 1922–23 season, re-election was required of the bottom two teams of both Third Division North and Third Division South.

Eight teams, Arsenal, Aston Villa, Sheffield Wednesday (1st Div), Everton (2nd Div.), Chesterfield, Lincoln City, Tranmere Rovers (3rd Div. North) and Crystal Palace (3rd Div. South) all scored over 100 goals. This is the most in Football League history.

Arsenal scored 60 away goals, the most to this day, while the 128 goals scored by Aston Villa remains a top flight record, and a record for any 42 game season.

== First Division ==
First Division
- Season: 1930–31
- Champions: Arsenal; 1st English title
- Relegated: Leeds United; Manchester United
- Matches: 462
- Goals: 1,823 (3.95 per match)
- Top goalscorer: Tom Waring (49 goals)
- Biggest home win: Huddersfield Town 10–1 Blackpool (13 December 1930)
- Biggest away win: Manchester United 0–6 Huddersfield Town (10 September 1930)
- Highest scoring: Manchester United 4–7 Newcastle United (13 September 1930); Newcastle United 4–7 Portsmouth (15 November 1930); Sunderland 6–5 Liverpool (6 December 1930)

Pos	Team	Pld	W	D	L	GF	GA	GAv	Pts	Relegation
1	Arsenal (C)	42	28	10	4	127	59	2.153	66	
2	Aston Villa	42	25	9	8	128	78	1.641	59	
3	Sheffield Wednesday	42	22	8	12	102	75	1.360	52	
4	Portsmouth	42	18	13	11	84	67	1.254	49	
5	Huddersfield Town	42	18	12	12	81	65	1.246	48	
6	Derby County	42	18	10	14	94	79	1.190	46	
7	Middlesbrough	42	19	8	15	98	90	1.089	46	
8	Manchester City	42	18	10	14	75	70	1.071	46	
9	Liverpool	42	15	12	15	86	85	1.012	42	
10	Blackburn Rovers	42	17	8	17	83	84	0.988	42	
11	Sunderland	42	16	9	17	89	85	1.047	41	
12	Chelsea	42	15	10	17	64	67	0.955	40	
13	Grimsby Town	42	17	5	20	82	87	0.943	39	
14	Bolton Wanderers	42	15	9	18	68	81	0.840	39	
15	Sheffield United	42	14	10	18	78	84	0.929	38	
16	Leicester City	42	16	6	20	80	95	0.842	38	
17	Newcastle United	42	15	6	21	78	87	0.897	36	
18	West Ham United	42	14	8	20	79	94	0.840	36	
19	Birmingham	42	13	10	19	55	70	0.786	36	
20	Blackpool	42	11	10	21	71	125	0.568	32	
21	Leeds United (R)	42	12	7	23	68	81	0.840	31	Relegation to the Second Division
22	Manchester United (R)	42	7	8	27	53	115	0.461	22	Relegation to the Second Division

Source: World Football
Rules for classification: 1) Points; 2) Goal average; 3) Goals scored
(C) Champions; (R) Relegated

=== Results ===
Home \ Away	ARS	AST	BIR	BLB	BLP	BOL	CHE	DER	GRI	HUD	LEE	LEI	LIV	MCI	MUN	MID	NEW	POR	SHU	SHW	SUN	WHU
Arsenal		5–2	1–1	3–2	7–1	5–0	2–1	6–3	9–1	0–0	3–1	4–1	3–1	3–1	4–1	5–3	1–2	1–1	1–1	2–0	1–3	1–1
Aston Villa	5–1		1–1	5–2	4–1	3–1	3–3	4–6	2–0	6–1	4–3	4–2	4–2	4–2	7–0	8–1	4–3	2–2	4–0	2–0	4–2	6–1
Birmingham	2–4	0–4		4–1	1–1	0–2	6–2	1–2	4–1	2–0	0–1	2–1	2–0	3–2	0–0	1–2	1–1	2–1	3–1	2–0	1–0	0–2
Blackburn Rovers	2–2	0–2	2–1		5–0	2–2	2–0	1–0	5–2	5–3	3–1	3–0	3–3	0–1	4–1	4–5	1–0	1–2	2–1	5–2	3–0	1–0
Blackpool	1–4	2–2	0–1	1–1		3–3	2–1	1–0	3–1	1–1	3–7	5–4	1–3	2–2	5–1	3–2	0–0	2–2	2–1	0–4	3–1	1–3
Bolton Wanderers	1–4	1–1	2–0	1–1	1–0		1–1	1–2	4–2	1–0	2–0	4–1	2–0	1–1	3–1	3–0	0–3	3–1	6–2	2–2	2–2	4–2
Chelsea	1–5	0–2	1–0	3–2	3–0	0–1		1–1	5–0	1–2	1–0	1–0	2–2	2–0	6–2	4–0	1–1	2–0	1–0	0–0	5–0	2–1
Derby County	4–2	1–1	0–0	1–1	3–2	4–1	6–2		1–0	4–1	4–1	1–0	2–2	1–1	6–1	1–2	1–5	5–1	4–3	2–3	4–1	1–1
Grimsby Town	0–1	1–2	4–1	2–0	6–2	4–1	0–1	5–3		2–1	2–0	8–2	0–0	3–5	2–1	4–1	2–2	0–3	2–1	2–3	2–1	4–0
Huddersfield Town	1–1	1–6	1–0	1–1	10–1	3–2	1–1	3–0	2–2		3–0	4–1	2–1	1–1	3–0	2–2	0–3	1–3	1–1	1–1	2–0	2–0
Leeds United	1–2	0–2	3–1	4–2	2–2	3–1	2–3	3–1	0–0	1–2		1–3	1–2	4–2	5–0	7–0	1–0	2–2	4–0	2–3	0–3	3–0
Leicester City	2–7	4–1	2–1	3–1	6–0	2–1	2–1	1–1	0–1	1–2	4–0		3–2	3–2	5–4	0–3	3–1	3–1	2–2	2–5	1–1	1–1
Liverpool	1–1	1–1	0–0	2–1	5–2	7–2	3–1	0–0	1–1	1–4	2–0	3–1		0–2	1–1	3–1	4–2	3–1	6–1	1–2	2–4	2–0
Manchester City	1–4	3–1	4–2	3–0	2–4	3–0	2–0	4–3	1–0	0–1	1–0	0–2	1–1		4–1	4–2	2–0	1–3	0–4	2–0	2–0	1–1
Manchester United	1–2	3–4	2–0	0–1	0–0	1–1	1–0	2–1	0–2	0–6	0–0	0–0	4–1	1–3		4–4	4–7	0–1	1–2	4–1	1–1	1–0
Middlesbrough	2–5	3–1	1–1	4–1	5–1	3–0	2–2	4–1	2–1	2–3	5–0	2–2	3–3	4–1	3–1		3–1	0–1	4–1	2–0	1–0	2–2
Newcastle United	1–3	2–0	2–2	2–3	0–2	4–0	1–0	2–5	1–2	1–1	4–1	5–2	0–4	0–1	4–3	0–5		4–7	1–0	1–2	2–0	4–2
Portsmouth	1–1	5–0	2–2	3–0	4–3	1–0	1–1	2–0	4–3	2–2	1–1	2–1	4–0	1–1	4–1	1–0	1–2		2–3	2–4	1–1	2–0
Sheffield United	1–1	3–4	3–1	1–1	5–1	2–0	4–0	3–3	2–1	0–2	1–1	0–2	4–1	2–2	3–1	4–2	3–1	3–1		1–1	3–3	1–2
Sheffield Wednesday	1–2	3–0	9–1	1–3	7–1	1–0	1–1	3–2	4–1	2–1	2–1	4–0	3–5	1–1	3–0	3–2	2–1	2–2	1–3		7–2	5–3
Sunderland	1–4	1–1	1–0	8–2	2–4	3–1	2–0	1–3	3–2	4–2	4–0	2–5	6–5	3–3	1–2	1–1	5–0	0–0	2–1	5–1		6–1
West Ham United	2–4	5–5	1–2	4–3	3–2	1–4	4–1	0–1	3–4	2–1	1–1	2–0	7–0	2–0	5–1	0–3	3–2	4–3	4–1	3–3	0–3	

Updated to match(es) played on unknown. Source:
Legend: Blue = home team win; Yellow = draw; Red = away team win.

=== Maps ===
Locations of the Football League First Division London teams
Locations of the Football League First Division teams

== Second Division ==
Second Division
- Season: 1930–31
- Champions: Everton
- Promoted: Everton; West Bromwich Albion
- Relegated: Reading; Cardiff City
- Matches: 462
- Goals: 1,608 (3.48 per match)
- Top goalscorer: Dixie Dean (39 goals)
- Biggest home win: Everton 9–1 Plymouth Argyle (27 December 1930)
- Biggest away win: Charlton Athletic 0–7 Everton (7 February 1931)
- Highest scoring: Millwall 5–7 Preston North End (4 October 1930)

Pos	Team	Pld	W	D	L	GF	GA	GAv	Pts	Relegation
1	Everton (C, P)	42	28	5	9	121	66	1.833	61	Promotion to the First Division
2	West Bromwich Albion (P)	42	22	10	10	83	49	1.694	54	Promotion to the First Division
3	Tottenham Hotspur	42	22	7	13	88	55	1.600	51	
4	Wolverhampton Wanderers	42	21	5	16	84	67	1.254	47	
5	Port Vale	42	21	5	16	67	61	1.098	47	
6	Bradford (Park Avenue)	42	18	10	14	97	66	1.470	46	
7	Preston North End	42	17	11	14	83	64	1.297	45	
8	Burnley	42	17	11	14	81	77	1.052	45	
9	Southampton	42	19	6	17	74	62	1.194	44	
10	Bradford City	42	17	10	15	61	63	0.968	44	
11	Stoke City	42	17	10	15	64	71	0.901	44	
12	Oldham Athletic	42	16	10	16	61	72	0.847	42	
13	Bury	42	19	3	20	75	82	0.915	41	
14	Millwall	42	16	7	19	71	80	0.888	39	
15	Charlton Athletic	42	15	9	18	59	86	0.686	39	
16	Bristol City	42	15	8	19	54	82	0.659	38	
17	Nottingham Forest	42	14	9	19	80	85	0.941	37	
18	Plymouth Argyle	42	14	8	20	76	84	0.905	36	
19	Barnsley	42	13	9	20	59	79	0.747	35	
20	Swansea Town	42	12	10	20	51	74	0.689	34	
21	Reading (R)	42	12	6	24	72	96	0.750	30	Relegation to the Third Division South
22	Cardiff City (R)	42	8	9	25	47	87	0.540	25	Relegation to the Third Division South

Rules for classification: 1) Points; 2) Goal average; 3) Goals scored
(C) Champions; (P) Promoted; (R) Relegated

=== Results ===
Home \ Away	BAR	BRA	BPA	BRI	BUR	BRY	CAR	CHA	EVE	MIL	NOT	OLD	PLY	PTV	PNE	REA	SOU	STK	SWA	TOT	WBA	WOL
Barnsley		2–1	1–0	1–0	0–1	2–1	4–0	5–0	1–1	2–3	3–1	1–2	0–4	5–2	1–1	3–2	3–1	4–2	1–0	0–1	0–0	3–0
Bradford City	1–0		0–4	1–1	2–3	3–1	2–1	3–2	0–3	0–0	1–0	0–0	1–0	2–1	0–0	6–1	4–3	2–2	3–0	2–0	2–3	4–1
Bradford Park Avenue	1–0	1–2		5–2	4–1	5–1	3–0	3–2	4–1	6–0	4–1	4–0	7–1	5–1	2–2	1–3	1–1	2–2	5–1	4–1	3–1	1–1
Bristol City	2–1	0–1	2–0		1–1	4–2	1–0	3–0	0–1	1–2	1–4	1–0	2–1	1–1	1–1	1–0	2–1	1–1	2–1	2–1	1–1	0–3
Burnley	2–2	1–1	3–2	4–2		0–2	1–0	1–1	5–2	2–1	5–2	6–1	2–2	1–2	1–0	8–1	3–2	1–2	2–2	1–0	2–1	4–2
Bury F.C.	3–1	3–1	3–1	6–0	2–1		3–0	0–1	2–2	5–0	1–0	1–3	2–0	0–3	3–0	2–2	1–0	0–3	2–0	2–0	2–2	1–0
Cardiff City	2–0	1–1	0–3	0–1	4–0	1–3		0–2	1–2	4–4	1–1	0–0	4–1	2–1	0–0	5–0	0–1	3–2	1–0	0–0	3–6	0–3
Charlton Athletic	1–1	2–1	3–1	0–0	2–1	3–2	4–1		0–7	2–0	1–1	1–1	1–3	3–1	1–3	2–1	3–1	1–2	3–0	1–0	0–4	1–2
Everton	5–2	4–2	4–2	1–3	3–2	3–2	1–1	7–1		2–0	2–0	6–4	9–1	2–3	2–1	3–2	2–1	5–0	5–1	4–2	2–1	4–0
Millwall	4–1	1–1	1–1	2–0	2–1	1–0	0–0	6–0	1–3		5–1	1–0	4–1	0–1	5–7	4–0	1–0	1–3	3–1	2–3	2–0	1–1
Nottingham Forest	3–3	4–1	1–0	6–1	3–3	3–0	3–1	4–3	2–2	2–1		4–1	1–1	1–0	1–4	1–1	3–1	3–0	3–0	2–2	1–6	3–4
Oldham Athletic	0–0	3–0	2–0	1–3	3–1	3–2	4–2	0–3	3–3	3–1	3–1		2–1	3–3	2–0	1–1	2–1	3–1	2–1	1–2	2–2	2–0
Plymouth Argyle	4–0	0–2	0–0	5–3	1–2	3–6	5–1	1–3	2–3	5–0	1–0	1–1		2–1	1–2	3–1	2–3	1–2	0–0	2–0	5–1	3–2
Port Vale	5–2	1–0	8–2	1–0	0–0	0–1	2–0	1–1	1–3	3–2	3–2	2–0	2–1		1–0	2–1	1–0	0–0	2–0	3–0	1–0	0–1
Preston North End	1–1	4–2	1–1	2–2	2–0	3–0	7–0	4–1	2–1	1–3	2–4	1–0	2–1	1–3		3–3	5–0	5–1	0–0	2–1	2–3	5–4
Reading	6–1	0–0	3–0	4–1	3–1	3–4	3–0	2–0	0–2	2–1	5–2	1–3	1–2	0–3	1–4		1–1	7–3	1–0	1–2	0–3	3–0
Southampton	4–0	4–1	2–3	5–1	1–1	5–0	0–1	3–0	2–1	3–1	0–0	1–0	3–3	2–0	2–1	3–2		2–1	1–2	0–3	1–1	2–0
Stoke City	0–0	1–1	1–1	3–1	1–1	3–1	1–0	0–0	2–0	2–3	1–0	4–0	0–0	1–0	3–1	2–1	1–3		5–0	2–1	0–1	1–2
Swansea Town	1–0	1–2	2–1	5–2	1–1	5–2	3–2	1–1	2–5	4–1	3–2	0–0	2–0	2–1	2–1	2–1	0–1	1–2		1–2	1–1	1–1
Tottenham Hotspur	4–2	3–1	3–2	4–1	8–1	3–1	2–2	5–0	1–0	4–1	2–1	4–0	1–1	5–0	0–0	7–1	1–3	3–0	1–1		2–2	1–0
West Bromwich Albion	5–0	1–0	1–1	3–0	2–0	2–0	3–2	3–2	1–2	0–0	2–1	2–0	1–2	4–1	2–0	1–0	1–2	4–0	0–0	0–2		2–1
Wolverhampton Wanderers	2–0	0–1	1–1	0–1	2–4	7–0	4–1	1–1	3–1	2–0	4–2	3–0	4–3	3–0	2–0	3–1	3–2	5–1	3–1	3–1	1–4	

Updated to match(es) played on unknown. Source: Ian Laschke: Rothmans Book of Football League Records 1888–89 to 1978–79. Macdonald and Jane’s, London & Sydney, 1980.
Legend: Blue = home team win; Yellow = draw; Red = away team win.

=== Maps ===
Locations of the Football League Second Division London teams
Locations of the Football League Second Division teams

== Third Division North ==
Football League Third Division North
- Season: 1930–31
- Champions: Chesterfield (1st title)
- Failed re-election: Nelson
- Matches: 462
- Goals: 1,714 (3.71 per match)
- Top goalscorer: Jimmy McConnell (Carlisle United), 37

Pos	Team	Pld	W	D	L	GF	GA	GAv	Pts	Promotion or relegation
1	Chesterfield (C, P)	42	26	6	10	102	57	1.789	58	Promotion to the Second Division
2	Lincoln City	42	25	7	10	102	59	1.729	57	
3	Wrexham	42	21	12	9	94	62	1.516	54	
4	Tranmere Rovers	42	24	6	12	111	74	1.500	54	
5	Southport	42	22	9	11	88	56	1.571	53	
6	Hull City	42	20	10	12	99	55	1.800	50	
7	Stockport County	42	20	9	13	77	61	1.262	49	
8	Carlisle United	42	20	5	17	98	81	1.210	45	
9	Gateshead	42	16	13	13	71	73	0.973	45	
10	Wigan Borough	42	19	5	18	76	86	0.884	43	
11	Darlington	42	16	10	16	71	59	1.203	42	
12	York City	42	18	6	18	85	82	1.037	42	
13	Accrington Stanley	42	15	9	18	84	108	0.778	39	
14	Rotherham United	42	13	12	17	81	83	0.976	38	
15	Doncaster Rovers	42	13	11	18	65	65	1.000	37	
16	Barrow	42	15	7	20	68	89	0.764	37	
17	Halifax Town	42	13	9	20	55	89	0.618	35	
18	Crewe Alexandra	42	14	6	22	66	93	0.710	34	
19	New Brighton	42	13	7	22	49	76	0.645	33	
20	Hartlepools United	42	12	6	24	67	86	0.779	30	
21	Rochdale	42	12	6	24	62	107	0.579	30	Re-elected
22	Nelson (R)	42	6	7	29	43	113	0.381	19	Failed re-election and demoted

Source: rsssf.com
(C) Division Champions; (P) Promoted; (R) Relegated

=== Results ===
Home \ Away	ACC	BRW	CRL	CHF	CRE	DAR	DON	GAT	HAL	HAR	HUL	LIN	NEL	NWB	ROC	ROT	SOU	STP	TRA	WIG	WRE	YOR
Accrington Stanley		3–1	3–0	1–3	3–1	2–1	2–0	2–1	1–1	0–2	1–3	5–3	3–1	3–0	2–3	3–2	2–0	2–2	5–2	3–0	1–3	4–2
Barrow	0–0		7–2	0–3	2–0	3–2	3–1	0–0	3–1	4–0	3–0	3–2	2–1	4–1	0–0	1–0	1–1	1–0	1–3	4–1	2–3	1–2
Carlisle United	7–3	0–1		0–0	4–1	2–1	1–1	2–2	6–2	3–0	1–5	3–6	8–1	2–0	7–1	1–2	4–3	5–1	3–0	6–1	1–1	2–0
Chesterfield	7–3	3–1	2–1		2–0	2–1	2–1	8–1	7–0	3–0	0–4	3–2	2–1	1–0	4–1	2–1	2–1	1–1	5–1	3–1	4–0	3–1
Crewe Alexandra	2–1	6–2	3–5	2–1		2–2	2–1	6–2	0–1	2–1	3–4	2–0	4–2	1–3	3–1	2–3	0–0	1–0	1–2	3–2	2–1	5–1
Darlington	1–1	3–2	3–0	5–1	1–2		0–0	2–2	4–1	4–2	2–4	0–1	2–1	3–1	1–1	2–2	2–3	1–2	2–0	2–3	1–1	3–0
Doncaster Rovers	6–1	0–0	2–0	1–0	2–0	1–2		1–1	3–3	1–1	0–2	0–1	2–0	0–0	4–0	3–3	0–0	2–0	6–0	5–1	1–1	0–2
Gateshead	4–0	4–1	1–0	3–3	2–2	1–1	2–1		3–1	0–0	1–0	0–1	2–0	4–0	0–2	2–0	2–3	2–1	3–0	4–2	4–3	2–1
Halifax Town	1–1	4–0	1–5	1–1	4–0	1–0	0–2	3–0		3–1	1–1	3–2	1–0	1–0	1–0	0–1	0–0	3–0	2–1	0–1	0–0	0–0
Hartlepool	3–3	3–2	3–5	1–3	2–0	1–1	0–2	2–3	2–1		1–3	0–3	4–0	4–1	4–0	4–2	0–2	1–2	1–2	6–1	2–1	3–0
Hull City	1–1	1–1	1–1	3–1	5–1	1–1	8–2	4–0	10–0	5–0		1–3	4–0	3–0	3–1	2–2	5–1	1–1	1–0	0–0	2–3	3–1
Lincoln City	5–2	5–0	5–1	1–1	3–1	1–0	1–0	0–0	4–1	1–0	3–0		2–0	4–0	5–0	1–3	3–3	6–1	1–3	2–0	3–2	4–1
Nelson	4–2	0–3	1–2	0–5	1–1	3–1	2–0	2–2	3–2	1–1	0–2	1–2		2–2	0–0	0–0	1–4	1–1	0–4	2–1	2–0	2–5
New Brighton	0–0	3–1	2–0	3–1	3–0	1–5	2–1	0–0	3–0	1–0	1–1	2–1	2–0		2–1	3–1	1–2	0–2	1–3	0–2	1–1	5–3
Rochdale	1–6	4–2	1–3	2–3	1–0	1–2	3–5	0–1	2–3	1–2	1–0	4–2	5–4	2–0		6–1	0–4	1–0	1–3	0–4	4–3	2–2
Rotherham United	8–1	6–0	1–0	0–1	1–1	0–2	3–0	1–1	2–1	1–1	1–1	2–2	3–0	2–0	1–3		3–3	3–4	4–6	5–2	1–4	2–1
Southport	3–3	3–2	1–2	3–0	3–1	0–1	2–1	1–0	5–2	2–0	1–0	1–2	8–1	3–0	4–0	4–1		2–0	1–1	3–1	1–1	1–0
Stockport County	4–1	6–0	3–0	2–1	2–0	0–1	2–2	3–1	3–0	3–1	3–2	4–2	1–0	2–0	2–2	5–2	2–0		1–1	4–1	2–2	0–0
Tranmere	8–0	5–0	2–0	2–0	0–0	1–2	1–2	2–1	2–2	5–4	4–0	3–3	7–1	3–3	7–3	4–2	3–1	3–0		5–1	2–1	4–1
Wigan Borough	3–2	2–1	1–2	1–5	6–0	2–0	3–0	3–3	3–0	3–2	3–1	0–1	3–1	1–1	3–0	0–0	1–0	2–1	4–3		1–1	3–1
Wrexham	6–1	1–1	2–1	2–1	7–0	2–0	4–1	5–1	3–2	2–0	2–0	2–2	5–1	2–1	1–1	3–2	2–4	3–2	2–2	2–0		3–2
York City	3–1	4–2	4–0	2–2	4–3	2–1	4–2	4–3	4–1	4–2	3–2	1–1	3–0	4–1	3–0	1–1	3–1	1–2	3–1	2–3	0–1	

Updated to match(es) played on unknown. Source: Ian Laschke: Rothmans Book of Football League Records 1888–89 to 1978–79. Macdonald and Jane’s, London & Sydney, 1980.
Legend: Blue = home team win; Yellow = draw; Red = away team win.

=== Maps ===
Locations of the Football League Third Division North teams

== Third Division South ==
Football League Third Division South
- Season: 1930–31
- Champions: Notts County (1st title)
- Failed re-election: Newport County
- Matches: 462
- Goals: 1,669 (3.61 per match)
- Top goalscorer: Peter Simpson (Crystal Palace), 46

Pos	Team	Pld	W	D	L	GF	GA	GAv	Pts	Promotion or relegation
1	Notts County (C, P)	42	24	11	7	97	46	2.109	59	Promotion to the Second Division
2	Crystal Palace	42	22	7	13	107	71	1.507	51	
3	Brentford	42	22	6	14	90	64	1.406	50	
4	Brighton & Hove Albion	42	17	15	10	68	53	1.283	49	
5	Southend United	42	22	5	15	76	60	1.267	49	
6	Northampton Town	42	18	12	12	77	59	1.305	48	
7	Luton Town	42	19	8	15	76	51	1.490	46	
8	Queens Park Rangers	42	20	3	19	82	75	1.093	43	
9	Fulham	42	18	7	17	77	75	1.027	43	
10	Bournemouth & Boscombe Athletic	42	15	13	14	72	73	0.986	43	
11	Torquay United	42	17	9	16	80	84	0.952	43	
12	Swindon Town	42	18	6	18	89	94	0.947	42	
13	Exeter City	42	17	8	17	84	90	0.933	42	
14	Coventry City	42	16	9	17	75	65	1.154	41	
15	Bristol Rovers	42	16	8	18	75	92	0.815	40	
16	Gillingham	42	14	10	18	61	76	0.803	38	
17	Walsall	42	14	9	19	78	95	0.821	37	Transferred to the Third Division North
18	Watford	42	14	7	21	72	75	0.960	35	
19	Clapton Orient	42	14	7	21	63	91	0.692	35	
20	Thames	42	13	8	21	54	93	0.581	34	
21	Newport County (R)	42	11	6	25	69	111	0.622	28	Failed re-election and demoted to the Southern League
22	Norwich City	42	10	8	24	47	76	0.618	28	Re-elected

(C) Division Champions; (P) Promoted; (R) Relegated

=== Results ===
Home \ Away	B&BA	BRE	B&HA	BRR	CLA	COV	CRY	EXE	FUL	GIL	LUT	NPC	NOR	NWC	NTC	QPR	STD	SWI	THA	TOR	WAL	WAT
Bournemouth & Boscombe Athletic		1–0	1–2	4–0	1–1	2–0	0–0	3–1	2–1	2–1	0–0	4–2	1–3	4–1	2–1	2–0	0–0	4–1	3–3	2–2	0–2	1–1
Brentford	1–2		3–2	4–0	3–0	1–2	8–2	2–1	4–1	1–1	0–1	3–2	0–4	3–1	2–2	5–3	3–1	5–2	6–1	0–0	6–1	2–1
Brighton & Hove Albion	3–1	1–0		4–0	3–1	2–0	1–1	3–2	1–1	5–0	2–0	5–0	1–1	1–0	1–3	1–1	1–2	1–0	2–4	3–0	3–3	1–0
Bristol Rovers	2–5	2–5	3–3		4–1	1–0	2–1	1–1	2–1	1–0	5–1	2–0	1–4	3–0	2–2	3–0	2–3	4–1	4–0	3–1	1–2	1–5
Clapton Orient	0–0	3–0	1–0	3–1		3–3	3–2	2–3	2–0	0–2	3–2	3–1	2–2	2–0	1–4	2–3	3–1	2–3	2–1	4–0	2–5	4–0
Coventry City	3–3	0–1	0–0	5–1	4–0		3–5	3–1	2–1	1–2	1–2	6–4	0–1	3–0	1–2	2–0	0–0	4–0	7–1	6–1	2–1	2–2
Crystal Palace	1–0	5–1	0–1	0–2	3–1	1–0		7–2	5–2	5–0	5–1	7–1	0–0	2–1	1–1	4–0	3–1	3–1	2–1	5–0	6–3	6–1
Exeter City	4–1	4–0	2–2	0–3	6–1	2–3	4–3		3–2	3–0	1–1	3–0	3–3	1–0	3–3	2–0	1–1	3–1	4–3	2–2	2–5	2–1
Fulham	1–0	1–1	0–1	6–2	2–0	0–0	2–0	4–2		1–1	2–1	0–1	4–2	1–0	3–1	0–2	1–0	6–1	4–2	3–0	5–2	3–2
Gillingham	0–0	1–1	0–0	1–1	0–0	2–0	6–2	3–5	3–2		4–0	4–1	0–2	2–1	0–5	2–2	1–0	0–1	3–1	2–3	2–0	4–2
Luton Town	2–3	1–1	2–2	4–1	0–1	2–0	1–2	3–1	5–0	4–1		3–1	4–0	1–0	3–0	5–1	2–1	4–0	8–0	3–1	0–0	4–1
Newport County	7–3	0–2	2–0	1–1	1–1	1–1	2–1	4–0	1–3	1–3	3–1		5–2	3–0	2–3	2–3	3–1	3–1	1–1	2–1	1–1	0–2
Northampton Town	2–2	1–2	2–1	1–1	0–0	0–3	0–0	1–0	4–2	0–1	0–0	1–0		3–1	0–0	6–0	4–0	3–0	4–1	0–3	3–0	2–3
Norwich City	2–1	3–0	2–2	1–3	2–0	2–2	2–1	1–2	1–1	4–0	1–0	4–1	1–1		2–2	1–1	0–1	2–0	0–0	3–0	3–1	0–1
Notts County	2–0	1–0	2–2	3–0	5–0	4–1	2–2	1–2	6–1	2–1	1–0	5–0	2–2	4–0		2–0	1–1	2–0	4–0	2–0	6–1	1–0
Queens Park Rangers	3–0	3–1	4–1	2–0	4–2	2–0	4–0	7–2	0–2	1–0	3–1	7–1	0–2	3–1	4–1		0–2	1–2	3–0	1–2	3–0	2–3
Southend	4–0	0–1	0–2	4–0	2–0	2–0	2–4	5–1	2–4	3–2	0–2	6–2	2–1	2–0	2–1	2–0		5–3	1–0	6–3	2–0	1–0
Swindon Town	4–1	3–2	1–1	3–1	5–1	4–0	4–4	2–1	4–1	5–2	0–0	4–4	5–1	5–2	1–2	4–1	1–1		3–0	4–0	4–3	2–1
Thames	1–4	2–0	0–0	1–2	3–0	1–2	0–2	1–0	0–0	2–2	1–0	3–1	2–1	2–0	0–0	1–0	3–0	3–2		1–1	4–1	3–2
Torquay United	4–4	0–3	3–1	3–3	5–2	0–0	3–1	0–0	3–1	3–0	1–1	3–0	3–0	2–0	1–4	6–2	3–1	5–0	5–1		0–1	3–1
Walsall	3–3	1–4	0–0	4–2	4–2	1–2	2–1	2–1	2–0	2–2	0–1	1–0	2–6	7–0	2–1	0–2	1–3	2–2	6–0	0–4		2–2
Watford	2–0	1–3	5–0	2–2	1–2	4–1	0–2	0–1	2–2	1–0	1–0	6–2	1–2	2–2	0–1	0–4	1–3	3–0	1–0	6–0	2–2	

Updated to match(es) played on unknown. Source: Ian Laschke: Rothmans Book of Football League Records 1888–89 to 1978–79. Macdonald and Jane’s, London & Sydney, 1980.
Legend: Blue = home team win; Yellow = draw; Red = away team win.

=== Maps ===
Locations of the Football League Third Division South London teams
Locations of the Football League Third Division South teams

== Records ==
- For these and other records, see:

== Attendances ==
=== Division One ===
No.	Club	Average	Highest	Lowest
1	Arsenal FC	37,106	56,417	15,751
2	Chelsea FC	35,808	74,667	12,968
3	Aston Villa FC	30,781	60,997	10,875
4	Manchester City FC	26,849	56,750	13,737
5	Newcastle United FC	26,151	68,089	9,159
6	Liverpool FC	26,086	44,342	6,045
7	Sunderland AFC	22,015	34,847	8,854
8	Sheffield Wednesday FC	19,911	43,671	5,102
9	Sheffield United FC	19,469	49,602	9,103
10	Birmingham City FC	19,135	49,609	6,535
11	Portsmouth FC	18,779	31,398	6,766
12	West Ham United FC	18,505	31,334	8,521
13	Blackpool FC	17,108	28,723	7,310
14	Leicester City FC	17,075	32,029	12,148
15	Middlesbrough FC	16,860	30,307	7,471
16	Blackburn Rovers FC	15,701	29,734	6,699
17	Bolton Wanderers FC	15,701	26,651	8,962
18	Derby County FC	15,040	29,783	6,613
19	Huddersfield Town AFC	13,929	25,853	4,091
20	Leeds United FC	13,385	30,265	5,572
21	Grimsby Town FC	13,082	22,394	5,741
22	Manchester United	11,685	39,876	3,679

== See also ==
- 1930-31 in English football
- 1930 in association football
- 1931 in association football
