= Freeburn =

Freeburn is a surname. Notable people with the surname include:

- James Freeburn (1808–1876), Scottish engineer, inventor, and industrial designer
- Jana Freeburn, Czechoslovak-born American slalom canoeist
- William Freeburn (1930–2019), Scottish footballer

== See also ==
- Freeburn, Kentucky
