= 1931 in association football =

The following are the football (soccer) events of the year 1931 throughout the world.

== Winners club national championship ==
- Argentina: Boca Juniors
- Belgium: R. Antwerp F.C.
- England: Arsenal
- Greece: Olympiacos
- Hungary: Újpest FC
- Iceland: KR
- Ireland:
  - League of Ireland: Shelbourne
- Italy: Juventus
- Netherlands: Ajax Amsterdam
- Paraguay: Olimpia Asunción
- Poland: Garbarnia Kraków
- Scotland: Rangers
- Soviet Union: Russia
- Spain: Athletic Bilbao

== International tournaments ==
- 1931 British Home Championship (October 20, 1930 – April 22, 1931)

Shared by England and Scotland

- Baltic Cup 1931 in Estonia (August 30 – September 1, 1931)

Estonia

- 1929-32 Nordic Football Championship (June 14, 1929 – September 25, 1932)
  1931: (May 25 – October 11, 1931)

Sweden (1931)
Norway (1929–1932)

- Balkan Cup 1929-31 (October 6, 1929 – November 29, 1931)

Romania

- Balkan Cup 1931 in Bulgaria (September 30 – October 4, 1931)

Bulgaria

== Births ==
- January 9: Ángel Berni, Paraguayan footballer (died 2017)
- January 18: André Piters, Belgian international footballer (died 2014)
- February 9: Josef Masopust, Czechoslovak international footballer and manager (died 2015)
- February 14: Newton de Sordi, Brazilian international footballer (died 2013)
- February 16: Bobby Collins, Scottish international footballer (died 2014)
- March 1: Arne Pedersen, Norwegian international footballer (died 2013)
- May 16: Vujadin Boškov, Yugoslav international football player and coach (died 2014)
- May 22: Francis Méano, French international footballer (died 1953)
- June 13: Jean-Jacques Marcel, French international footballer (died 2014)
- June 28: Aleksandar Ivoš, Serbian footballer (died 2020)
- July 5: Gerd Lauck, German footballer (died 2005)
- August 2: Yuri Kuznetsov, Soviet international footballer (died 2016)
- August 5: Billy Bingham, Northern Irish international footballer and manager (died 2022)
- September 19: Hiroto Muraoka, Japanese football player (died 2017)
- October 7: David Williams, English professional footballer
- October 13: Raymond Kopa, French international footballer (died 2017)
- November 6: Pál Várhidi, Hungarian international footballer and manager (died 2015)
- November 27: Ken Jenkin, English professional footballer
- December 27: John Charles, Welsh international footballer (died 2004)

== Deaths ==
- 5 September: John Thomson, Scottish international footballer (born 1909)
