= Kenneth Jenkins =

Ken, Kenny or Kenneth Jenkins may refer to:

- Kenneth Jenkins (born 1913), British sprinter in 1938 European Athletics Championships – Men's 200 metres
- G. Kenneth Jenkins (1918–2005), English numismatics scholar
- Ken Jenkins (born 1940), American actor in TV sitcom Scrubs
- Kenny Jenkins (1945–2009), Scottish footballer who played in attack and defence
- Ken Jenkins (American football) (born 1959), running back with NFL rushing record
- Ken Jenkins (politician) (born 1962), American executive of Westchester County, New York

== See also ==
- Ken Jenkin (1931–2024), English footballer who played as winger
