= John Bone =

John Bone may refer to:

- John Bone (bishop) (1930–2014), British religious leader
- John T. Bone (1947–2019), British pornographic film director
- John Gavin Bone (1914–1983), Scottish Olympic cyclist
- John Bone (footballer) (1930–2002), English footballer
