= Michael Obiku =

Nigerian footballer (born 1968)

Personal information
- Full name: Michael Edirin Obiku
- Date of birth: 24 September 1968 (age 58)
- Place of birth: Warri, Nigeria
- Height: 1.84 m (6 ft 0 in)
- Position: Forward

Senior career*
| Years | Team | Apps | (Gls) |
| 1986–1987 | Flash Flamingoes | 29 | (13) |
| 1987–1989 | Iwuanyanwu Nationale | 40 | (28) |
| 1989–1992 | Anorthosis Famagusta | 69 | (33) |
| 1992–1996 | Feyenoord | 71 | (23) |
| 1994 | → Helsingborg (loan) | 14 | (9) |
| 1996–1997 | Mallorca | 26 | (14) |
| 1997–1998 | Avispa Fukuoka | 25 | (9) |
| 1998–1999 | AZ | 13 | (2) |
| 1999–2000 | Anorthosis Famagusta | 21 | (14) |
| Total | | 308 | (145) |

International career
| 1988–1993 | Nigeria | 5 | (1) |
| 1988 | Nigeria Olympic | 2 | (0) |

Managerial career
- 2007–: Sparta Rotterdam (youth)
- * Club domestic league appearances and goals

Michael (“Mike”) Edirin Obiku (born 24 September 1968) is a Nigerian former professional footballer who played as a forward.

== Club career ==
Born in Warri, Obiku started his career with Flash Flamingoes in his native Nigeria and earned a move to highfliers Iwuanyanwu Nationale. From there, he moved on to become very successful in Cyprus. Then Feyenoord Rotterdam chairman Jorien van den Herik, who had a house on Cyprus, lured him to Rotterdam. On club level he won the Dutch Eredivisie in 1993 and the KNVB Cup in 1994 and 1995 with Feyenoord. He later became the first Nigerian to play in the J1 League. In 1999–2000 he returned to Cyprus and to his favourite team Anorthosis Famagusta F.C. He scored 13 goals and helped his club to win the Cypriot Championship for the fourth time in a row in Cyprus. After so many years Obiku is still one of the legends of Anorthosis Famagusta and he is considered one of the all-time best players who ever played not only for the club but also in Cyprus. The fans never forgot his first spell in the club in 1989–1992 scoring 36 goals and gave him the nick "Black Diamond".

=== Memorable moments ===
When Obiku scored for Feyenoord, he usually took off his shirt, threw it on the ground and danced around it.

During a match against Willem II he jumped in the fences surrounding the pitch and injured his hands while grabbing the barbed wire. He did play on but had to have treatment on his bleeding hands first.

On 8 March 1995 he won over the Rotterdam supporters when he scored the golden goal in the KNVB Cup quarter-finals against eternal rivals Ajax Amsterdam. Ajax won the Champions League that season but were finished off by Obiku thanks to a marvellous solo effort.

== International career ==
He represented the Nigerian national team at the 1988 African Cup of Nations, played in two World Cup qualifying matches and played 12 minutes at the 1988 Summer Olympics. He played his final international match in April 1993 against Ethiopia.
