= Dick van Well =

Dutch businessman (born 1948)

Personal information
- Place of birth: Rotterdam, Netherlands

Managerial career
- Years: Team
- 2007–2015: Feyenoord (chairman)

Dick van Well (Dutch pronunciation: [ˈdɪk fɑn ˈʋɛl]; (Note: In isolation, van is pronounced [vɑn].) born 1948) is a Dutch businessman and is mainly known for being chairman of Dutch football team Feyenoord Rotterdam between 2007–2015.

Van Well was chairman of the Dura Vermeer Group in Zoetermeer for many years. He is known to support Feyenoord since the 1960s, the time that the quality of Dutch football improved to their glorious years in the 1970s, including Feyenoord European Cup win in 1970. He also has his own business seat in the Feijenoord Stadion. Van Well was appointed as Feyenoord's new chairman after Jorien van den Herik was forced to withdraw from his position in the 2006-07 season. The man who saved Feyenoord from bankruptcy in 1992 now made some financial errors, which eventually placed the club under special guardianship.

A group of Feyenoord icons including former chairman Gerard Kerkum operated in the "Commissie Kerkum" to restructure Feyenoord's future. In December 2006 they published their thoughts and came to the conclusion that Van den Herik should leave the club. Van Well was asked by the commission to become Feyenoord's new chairman. He did not want to become the chairman right away, but from the start of the 2007-08 season. As a result, Kerkum himself took over from Van den Herik for the rest of the season and warmed Van Well up for the start of the new season.

Feyenoord surprised everyone in the 2007 summer break when they managed to do some surprise player purchases like Giovanni van Bronckhorst, Roy Makaay and the return of manager Bert van Marwijk. The media reported that although Van den Herik had left Feyenoord already, he had a big effort in bringing these players to the club.
