= Aleksandar Ivoš =

Yugoslav and Serbian footballer (1931–2020)

Personal information
- Full name: Aleksandar Ivoš
- Date of birth: 28 June 1931
- Place of birth: Valjevo, Kingdom of Yugoslavia
- Date of death: 24 December 2020 (aged 89)
- Place of death: Novi Sad, Serbia
- Height: 1.70 m (5 ft 7 in)
- Position: Forward

Youth career
- LSK Loznica

Senior career*
Years	Team	Apps	(Gls)
1953–1954	Mačva Šabac	17	(15)
1954–1961	Vojvodina	142	(34)
1961–1963	Sloboda Tuzla	45	(8)
1963–1964	Simmering	25	(4)
1964–1966	Sloboda Tuzla	53	(3)
1966–1968	Beringen	53	(0)
Total		335	(64)

International career
1962	Yugoslavia	3	(0)
- * Club domestic league appearances and goals

Aleksandar Ivoš (Serbian Cyrillic: Александар Ивош; 28 June 1931 – 24 December 2020) was a Yugoslav and Serbian professional footballer who played as a forward.

== Club career ==
Born in Valjevo, Ivoš grew up in Loznica and made his first football steps at local club LSK. He later played for Mačva Šabac in the Yugoslav Second League, before joining Vojvodina in 1954. Over the next seven seasons with the club, Ivoš amassed 142 appearances and scored 34 goals in the Yugoslav First League. He subsequently joined Sloboda Tuzla, helping the club win promotion to the top flight in 1962. In 1963, Ivoš went abroad to Austria and spent one season with 1. Simmeringer SC. He then returned to Sloboda Tuzla for two more seasons. In 1966, Ivoš moved abroad for the second time and played for Belgian club Beringen until 1968.

== International career ==
At international level, Ivoš was capped three times for Yugoslavia in 1962. He was a member of the squad at the 1962 FIFA World Cup, remaining an unused substitute throughout the tournament.
