= David Williams (footballer, born 1931) =

English footballer (1931–2012)

Personal information
- Date of birth: 7 October 1931
- Place of birth: Sheffield, England
- Date of death: 2 March 2012 (aged 80)
- Place of death: Toronto, Ontario, Canada
- Height: 5 ft 10 in (1.78 m)
- Position: Wing half

Senior career*
Years	Team	Apps	(Gls)
1952–1953	Beighton Miners Welfare		
1953–1954	Grimsby Town	5	(0)
- * Club domestic league appearances and goals

David Williams (7 October 1931 – 2 March 2012) was an English professional footballer who played as a wing half.

Williams died in Toronto on 2 March 2012, at the age of 80.
