= Harold Greetham =

English footballer (1930–2018)

Personal information
- Full name: Harold Greetham
- Date of birth: 7 March 1930
- Place of birth: Grimsby, England
- Date of death: December 2018 (aged 88)
- Place of death: Grimsby, England
- Height: 5 ft 8 in (1.73 m)
- Position: Full-back

Senior career*
Years	Team	Apps	(Gls)
1950–1951	Grimsby Town	4	(0)
1951–195?	Skegness Town		
- * Club domestic league appearances and goals

Harold Greetham (7 March 1930 – December 2018) was an English professional footballer who played as a full-back.
