= Tommy Ritchie =

Northern Ireland footballer

Personal information
- Full name: Tommy Ritchie
- Date of birth: 10 July 1930
- Place of birth: Bangor, County Down, Northern Ireland
- Date of death: Novewmber 2017 (aged 87)
- Place of death: Oxfordshire, England
- Position: Inside forward

Senior career*
Years	Team	Apps	(Gls)
1949–1950	Bangor		
1950–1953	Manchester United	0	(0)
1953–1955	Reading	18	(5)
1955–1956	Bedford Town		
1956–1958	Dartford		
1958	Grimsby Town	1	(0)
1958–1959	Barrow	16	(6)
1959–19??	Guildford City		
- * Club domestic league appearances and goals

Tommy Ritchie ( 10 July 1930 - November 2017) was a Northern Irish professional footballer who played as an inside forward.
