= George Thomas (entrepreneur) =

George Thomas was an African-American who found success in the Russian Empire during the reign of Nicholas II.

Thomas moved to St. Petersburg in 1890 to become a valet. The tsars had long hired black servants, and Afro-Russians could become extremely successful (see, for example Abram Petrovich Gannibal or Ira Aldridge). Thomas became an extremely rich and successful nightclub owner, theatrical producer, and more; he owned and ran the Aquarium, which boasted a theater, an amphitheater, back rooms, and so on. As examples of his place in society, Thomas hosted men like Jimmy Winkfield, had connections with the Tsar, and once introduced Jack Johnson to Rasputin. Thomas adopted the Russian name of Fyodor.

Thomas fled to Constantinople during the Russian Revolution but was never as rich and famous as he once had been.
