= George Thomas (Indian cricketer) =

Indian cricketer

Cricket information
- Bowling: Right-arm fast

Domestic team information
- Years: Team
- 1962-63 to 1969–70: Madras

Career statistics
| Competition | First-class |
|---|---|
| Matches | 13 |
| Runs scored | 44 |
| Batting average | 4.44 |
| 100s/50s | 0/0 |
| Top score | 22 |
| Balls bowled | 1314 |
| Wickets | 22 |
| Bowling average | 24.54 |
| 5 wickets in innings | 0 |
| 10 wickets in match | 0 |
| Best bowling | 4/30 |
| Catches/stumpings | 2/0 |
- Source: ESPNcricinfo, 7 October 2015

George Thomas (Note: Years of birth and death: Judging by the ages (where known) of the other boys who played in the Cooch Behar Trophy at the time, Thomas was probably born in 1941, 1942 or 1943. Waheed Yar Khan, for example, who played alongside Thomas in the South Zone Schools team in the same three seasons, was born in November 1942. Thomas died before August 2015.) was an Indian cricketer who played first-class cricket for Madras from 1962 to 1969.

== Playing career ==
George Thomas was a prominent schoolboy fast bowler who represented Madras Schools and South Zone Schools in the national Cooch Behar Trophy in 1957–58, 1958–59 and 1959–60.

Thomas made his first-class debut as a fast bowler and tail-end batsman for Madras in 1962–63 against Kerala in the Ranji Trophy. He took the wicket of the first opening batsman in each innings, and Madras won by an innings, but he was no-balled for throwing. He took one wicket in the next match, which was ruined by rain, and was then omitted. Thomas returned to the team in 1963–64 and opened the bowling in all three of Madras's matches, taking five wickets at an average of 33.80 in an attack based on spinners led by V. V. Kumar.

He played the first match in 1964–65, taking one wicket, and was left out of the team for the next two matches. He returned for the last match, against Andhra, and took 4 for 30 and 2 for 41 in an innings victory.

Thomas seldom played thereafter, but returned for the Gopalan Trophy match in 1968–69, making his highest score, 22, and taking 4 for 58, including the wickets of Anura Tennekoon (leg-before) and David Heyn (bowled). His last match came in 1969–70, when, for his last wicket, he bowled the Andhra opening batsman before a run had been scored in the match.

Thomas was one of the early players for the Jolly Rovers cricket club in Chennai, which began in 1966.
