= Cabeção (footballer) =

Brazilian footballer (1930–2020)

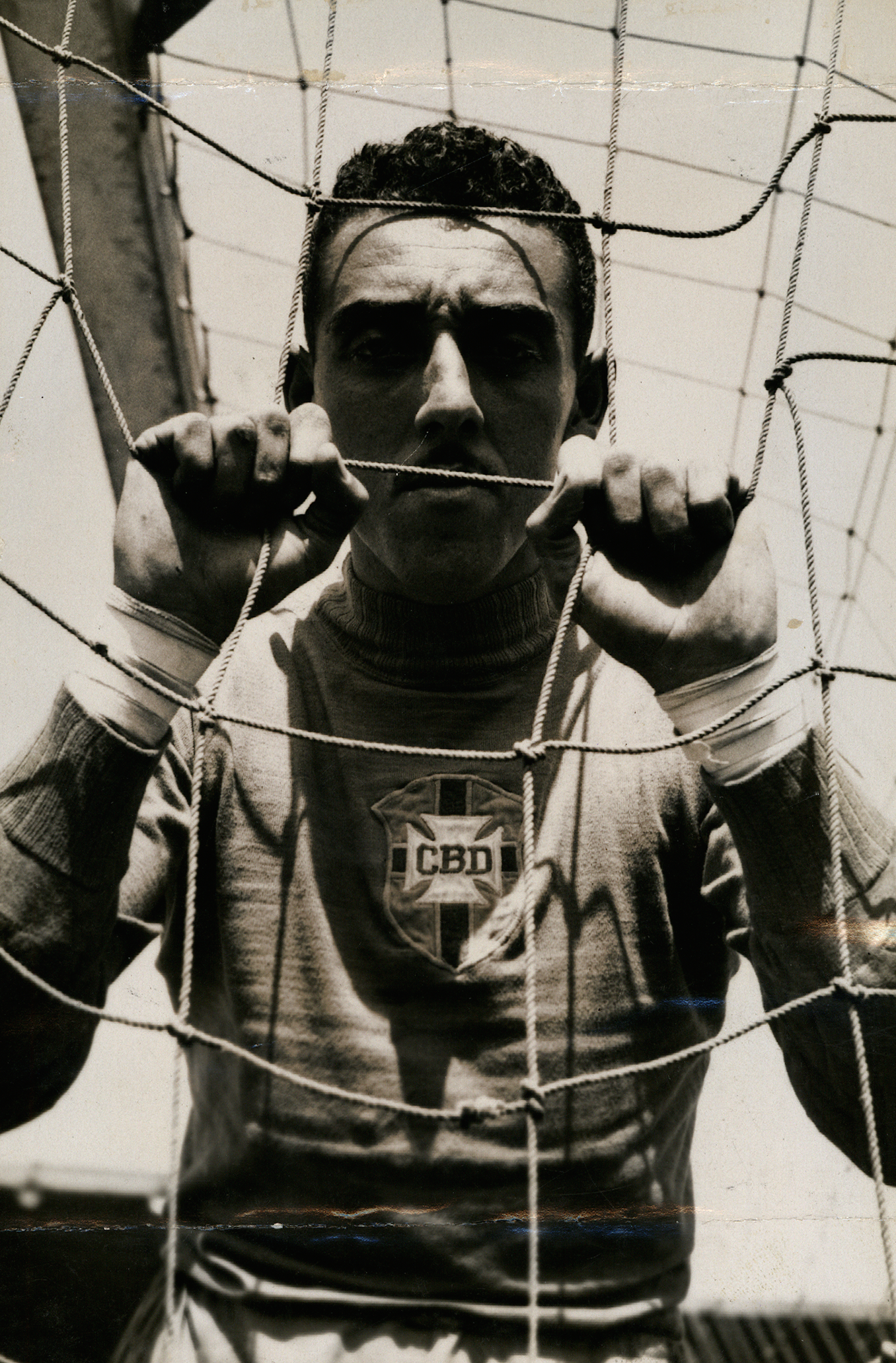

Personal information
- Full name: Luís Morais
- Date of birth: 23 August 1930
- Place of birth: São Paulo, Brazil
- Date of death: 6 January 2020 (aged 89)
- Position: Goalkeeper

Senior career*
Years	Team	Apps	(Gls)
1949–1954	Corinthians		
1954–1955	Bangu		
1955–1957	Portuguesa		
1957–1960	Corinthians		
- * Club domestic league appearances and goals

Luís Morais (23 August 1930 – 6 January 2020), also known as Cabeção, was a Brazilian football player. He played for the Brazil national football team at the 1954 FIFA World Cup finals.

Cabeção played club football for Corinthians, Bangu, Portuguesa, Comercial-SP, Juventus-SP and Portuguesa Santista, winning the Campeonato Paulista in 1951, 1952 and 1954 with Corinthians. Cabeção died on 6 January 2020 at the age of 89.
