= James Freeburn =

Scottish engineer, inventor and industrial designer

James Freeburn (1808 – 5 August 1876) was a Scottish engineer, inventor and industrial designer.

He was born in 1808 in the parish of St. Cuthbert's, Midlothian. At an early age he was apprenticed to a baker. At the age of seventeen he enlisted in the 7th battalion of the Royal Artillery, and for a time served as gunner and driver. In December 1827 he was made bombardier(an archaic name for artillery crewman) and then in May 1831 corporal. In January 1835 he was appointed sergeant and finally in April 1844 sergeant-major. From May 1837 to September 1840 he served abroad in the West Indies. On his return home he began to devote his attention to the subject of explosives. During 1846 he was commissioned quartermaster of the 10th battalion Royal Artillery. There he invented an elaborate series of metal and wood fuses for exploding live artillery shells both on 'concussion' and by 'time'. In 1847 he effected improvements on his original idea and his fuses were approved by the Master-General of the Ordnance then adopted in Her Majesty's Forces. Freeburn continued in the Royal Artillery until 21 April 1856, when he retired with the honorary rank of captain, on retired half-pay of 10s Per diem.

He died at Plumstead on 5 August 1876.
