= Brian Johnson (footballer, born 1930) =

English footballer

Personal information
- Full name: Brian Arthur Bentley Johnson
- Date of birth: 28 May 1930
- Place of birth: Northwich, England
- Date of death: 2013 (aged 82–83)
- Place of death: Cheshire, England
- Position: Winger

Senior career*
| Years | Team | Apps | (Gls) |
| 1950–1952 | Wrexham | 14 | (2) |
- Witton Albion
- * Club domestic league appearances and goals

Brian Arthur Bentley Johnson (28 May 1930 – November 2013) was an English professional footballer who played as a winger. He made appearances in the English Football League for Wrexham
