= Denys Jones =

Welsh footballer

Personal information
- Full name: Denys John Jones
- Date of birth: 19 October 1930
- Place of birth: Aberdare, Wales
- Date of death: May 2003 (aged 72)
- Place of death: Norwich, England
- Position: Winger

Youth career
- Cardiff City

Senior career*
Years	Team	Apps	(Gls)
- Great Yarmouth Town
1951–1953	Norwich City	5	(2)
1953–1955	Chelmsford City		
1955–1957	Wisbech Town		
- Lowestoft Town
- Gothic
- * Club domestic league appearances and goals

Denys John Jones (19 October 1930 — May 2003) was a Welsh footballer who played as a winger.

== Career ==
In April 1951, Jones signed for Norwich City from Great Yarmouth Town. Jones made five Football League appearances for Norwich over the course of two years, before moving to Chelmsford City. Jones would subsequently go on to play for Wisbech Town, Lowestoft Town and Gothic.
