= Ken Jenkin =

English footballer (1931–2024)

Personal information
- Full name: Kenneth Jenkin
- Date of birth: 27 November 1931
- Place of birth: Grimsby, England
- Date of death: 15 July 2024 (aged 92)
- Place of death: Grimsby, England
- Position: Winger

Senior career*
Years	Team	Apps	(Gls)
1950–1954	Grimsby Town	23	(6)
- * Club domestic league appearances and goals

Kenneth Jenkin (27 November 1931 – 15 July 2024) was an English professional footballer who played as a winger. He died in Grimsby on 15 July 2024, at the age of 92.
