= William Freeburn =

Scottish footballer (1930–2019)

Personal information
- Full name: William Openshaw Freeburn
- Date of birth: 7 April 1930
- Place of birth: Hamilton, Scotland
- Date of death: 25 December 2019 (aged 89)
- Place of death: Grimsby, North Lincolnshire, England
- Position: Full-back

Senior career*
Years	Team	Apps	(Gls)
1946–1947	Wellwood		
1947–1950	Dunfermline Athletic		
1950–1951	East Stirlingshire		
1951–1955	Grimsby Town	34	(0)
- * Club domestic league appearances and goals

William Openshaw Freeburn (7 April 1930 – 25 December 2019) was a Scottish footballer, who played as a full-back.

== Biography ==
William Openshaw Freeburn was born on 7 April 1930 in Hamilton, Scotland. He played for four teams: Wellwood (1946-1947), Dunfermline Athletic (1947-1950), East Stirlingshire (1950-1951) and Grimsby Town (1951-1955). He died at the age of 89 on 25 December 2019, in Grimsby, North Lincolnshire, England.
