= John Bone (footballer) =

English footballer

Personal information
- Date of birth: 19 December 1930
- Place of birth: Hartlepool, England
- Date of death: January 2002 (aged 71)
- Place of death: Hartlepool, England
- Position: Defender

Senior career*
Years	Team	Apps	(Gls)
1949–1950	Hartlepool United	0	(0)
1950–1951	Wingate Welfare		
1951–1958	Sunderland	11	(0)
1958–19??	Cambridge City		
- * Club domestic league appearances and goals

John Bone (19 December 1930 – January 2002) was an English professional footballer who played as a defender for Sunderland.
