= Gerard Kerkum =

Dutch footballer

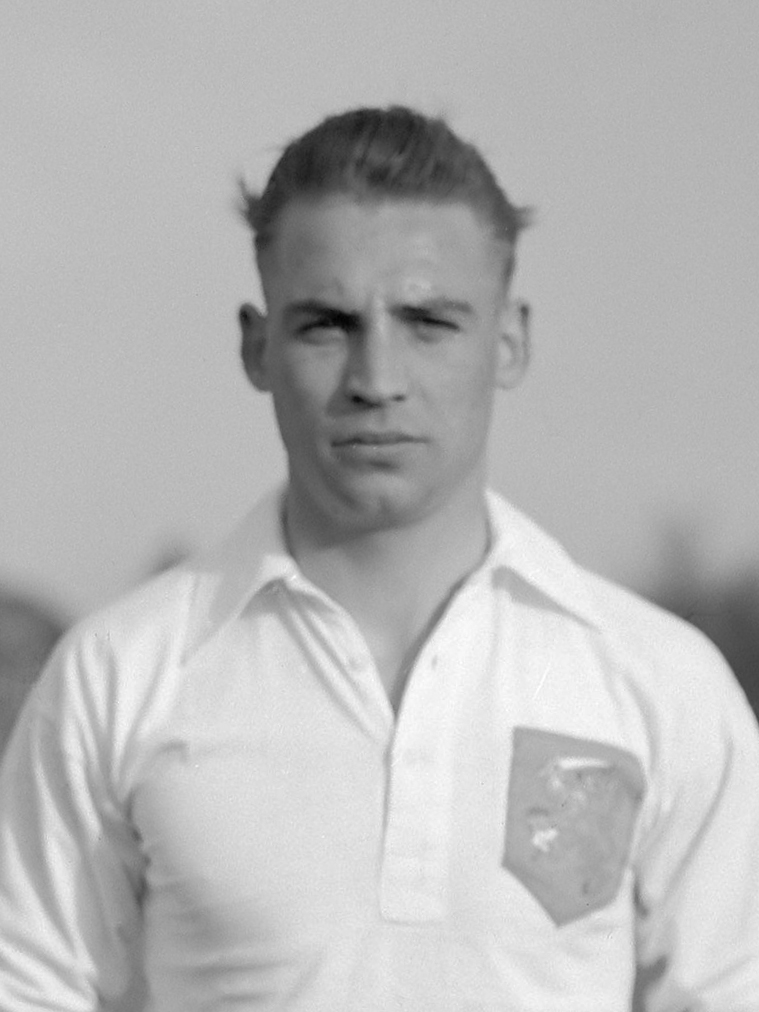
- Kerkum in 1956

Personal information
- Full name: Gerardus Gosewinus Kerkum
- Date of birth: 17 December 1930
- Place of birth: Rotterdam, Netherlands
- Date of death: 26 May 2018 (aged 87)
- Place of death: Rotterdam, Netherlands
- Position: Defender

Youth career
- Feijenoord

Senior career*
Years	Team	Apps	(Gls)
1951–1965	Feijenoord	349	(13)

International career
1960	Netherlands	1	(0)

Managerial career
- 1982–1989: Feyenoord (chairman)
- 2006–2006: Feyenoord (Commisie Kerkum)
- 2006–2007: Feyenoord (chairman)
- * Club domestic league appearances and goals

Gerard Kerkum (17 December 1930 – 26 May 2018) was a Dutch footballer and was twice chairman of Dutch football team Feyenoord Rotterdam.

Kerkum, born in Rotterdam, played a total of 349 matches in Feyenoord's (Feijenoord in those days) first team from 1951 to 1965. He was the team's captain for many years and scored a total of 13 goals for the club. He played one match for the Dutch national team.

After his career Kerkum entered the Feyenoord staff and board before he became the first and to present only former Feyenoord player to be chairman of the club in 1982. He stayed at the club until 1989, when Feyenoord suffered with financial problems and was succeeded by Jorien van den Herik. In 1984 Feyenoord won the double, winning both the Eredivisie and the KNVB Cup.

In the time that Van den Herik was Feyenoord's chairman (1989–2006) Kerkum was no longer part of the team, but always stayed in contact with those who were. After the growing pressure on Van den Herik in the media and by the fans in 2006 due to financial trouble and underachievements Feyenoord decided that the club's future had to be re-evaluated. This was done by a newly formed commission called the Commissie Kerkum, led by Gerard Kerkum.

The Commissie Kerkum had several meetings and finally came to the conclusion things at the club had to change. One of the results was that Van den Herik had to leave the club in December 2006. As Feyenoord was unable to find a new chairman right away Van den Herik was temporary replaced by Kerkum himself, until the end of the 2006–07 season. From then on Dick van Well took over as the new chairman at the club.
