= George Thomas (footballer, born 1930) =

Welsh footballer

Personal information
- Full name: George Vincent Thomas
- Date of birth: 25 June 1930
- Place of birth: Cardiff, Wales
- Date of death: February 2014 (aged 83)
- Place of death: Rhondda, Wales
- Position: Wing half

Youth career
- Cardiff Nomads
- 1949–1953: Cardiff City

Senior career*
Years	Team	Apps	(Gls)
1953–1959	Newport County	137	(0)
- Bath City
- * Club domestic league appearances and goals

George Vincent Thomas (25 June 1930 – February 2014) was a Welsh professional footballer. A wing half, he played for Cardiff City before joining Newport County in 1953, and went on to make 137 appearances in the Football League for the club between then and 1959.
