= Jorien van den Herik =

Dutch businessman

- Full name: Jorien van den Herik
- Born: November 11, 1943 (age 82); Sliedrecht, Netherlands
- Other occupation: Businessman

Domestic
Years	League	Role
1992–2006	Feyenoord (Chairman)	Chairman

Jorien van den Herik (born 11 November 1943 in Sliedrecht) is a Dutch businessman. He is most widely known as the former chairman of Dutch football club Feyenoord Rotterdam between 1992 and 2006.

Van den Herik helped Feyenoord to purchase some players in 1984 as chairman of the "Friends of Feyenoord Group". In a few years time he had invested 3 million Dutch guldens in the club. In 1989 he became president of the Stadion Feyenoord NV. When Feyenoord almost was bankrupt due to their sponsor HCS, Van den Herik claimed his position in the Feyenoord board by saying "If I lose my money, I would like to be there myself". In 1992, he became Feyenoord's chairman by taking over from Amandus Lundqvist.

The 2005/06 season ended in disappointment for Feyenoord. The team was challenging the Dutch Championship for most of the season, but eventually lost it to PSV Eindhoven. The newly born Dutch play-offs (held for the first time that year) then became fatal for Feyenoord. Ajax Amsterdam which ended on a fair distance in the regular league was Feyenoord's opponent in the play-offs and overclassed them and Feyenoord was eliminated for winning an UEFA Champions League ticket. During the summer break Feyenoord had to sell two of their key players, Salomon Kalou and the very popular Dirk Kuyt. Only a small amount of the money became available to invest in new players. When Angelos Charisteas was signed from arch rivals Ajax to replace Dirk Kuyt hundreds of die-hard fans moved to the Feyenoord board to force Van den Herik to resign. Van den Herik stayed at the team and did not want to give up his position, unless the growing pressure, the underperforming of the team and several other problems that had not been solved yet. In the meanwhile Feyenoord was placed under special guardianship because of their financial problems. A group of some Feyenoord icons, with former chairman Gerard Kerkum as their leader, operated under the name of "Commissie Kerkum" to restructure Feyenoord's future. In December 2006 they published their thoughts and came to the conclusion that Van den Herik should leave the club. Still Van den Herik did not want to leave, however after hooligan incidents in Nancy and the growing pressure he announced his retirement in mid December. Van den Herik himself said not the thoughts of the Commissie Kerkum were the key factor for his decision, but the upcoming final result in the fraud case was. After the case was finished in December 2006 - Van den Herik was acquitted - he stepped down.

In the summer transfer window of 2007, Feyenoord surprised friend and foe with the signing of big names like Roy Makaay and Giovanni van Bronckhorst. According to player manager Rob Jansen, Van den Herik played an important role in the realization of the transfers.

== Feyenoord's honours under Jorien van den Herik ==
- Eredivisie Championships:
  - 1993, 1999
- KNVB Cups:
  - 1992, 1994, 1995
- Supercup:
  - 1999
- UEFA Cup:
  - 2002
