= List of European association football families =

This is a list of association football families in Europe. The countries are listed according to the national teams of the senior family member if the other family member played for a different country. If the senior members of the given member did not play international football, the family will be listed according to nationality (e.g., the Trézéguets).

Families included on the list must have

1. at least, one member of the family is capped by a national team on the senior level or an important person in the game of football (e.g., notable coaches, referees, club chairmen, etc.)
2. a second member must be a professional player or capped by a national team on the senior level.

== Albania ==
- Arlind Ajeti, (Switzerland) Adonis Ajeti (brother), (Switzerland) Albian Ajeti (brother/Adonis's twin)
- Migjen Basha, Vullnet Basha (brother)
- Agim Cana, Lorik Cana (son)
- Armend Dallku, (Kosovo) Ardin Dallku (brother)
- Klodian Duro, Albert Duro (brother)
- Jürgen Gjasula, Klaus Gjasula (brother)
- Ali Mema, Osman Mema (brother), Ardian Mema (son), Sulejman Mema (nephew)
- Besnik Prenga, Herdi Prenga (son)
- Cristian Shpendi, Stiven Shpendi (twin brother)
- Foto Strakosha, Thomas Strakosha (son), Dhimitri Strakosha (son)
- Taulant Xhaka, (Switzerland) Granit Xhaka (brother) Armando Sadiku (cousin)
- Igli Tare, Isa Tare (father), (Germany) Etienne Tare (son)

== Andorra ==
- Koldo Álvarez, Iker Álvarez (son)
- Ariana Gonçalves, Bibiana Gonçalves (sister)
- Antoni Lima, Ildefons Lima (brother)

== Armenia ==
- Arman Karamyan, Artavazd Karamyan (twin brother)
- Ruslan Koryan, (Russia) Arshak Koryan (cousin)
- Hamlet Mkhitaryan, Henrikh Mkhitaryan (son)
- Ivan Yagan, (Belgium) Ben Yagan (brother)
- Artur Yedigaryan, Artak Yedigaryan (brother)

== Austria ==
- Caleb Chukwuemeka, Carney Chukwuemeka (brother)
- Yusuf Demir, (Turkey) Furkan Demir (brother)
- Goran Djuricin, Marco Djuricin (son)
- Wolfgang Feiersinger, Laura Feiersinger (daughter)
- Rudi Flögel, Thomas Flögel (son)
- Werner Gregoritsch, Michael Gregoritsch (son)
- Ralph Hasenhüttl, Patrick Hasenhüttl (son)
- Raimund Hedl, Niklas Hedl (son)
- Erich Hof, Norbert Hof (brother)
- Robert Ibertsberger, Andreas Ibertsberger (brother)
- Clemens Ivanschitz, Andreas Ivanschitz (brother)
- Wolfgang Kienast, Reinhard Kienast (brother), Roman Kienast (son of Wolfgang)
- Wolfgang Knaller, Walter Knaller (brother), Marco Knaller (son)
- Robert Körner, Alfred Körner (brother)
- Ernst Kozlicek, Paul Kozlicek (brother)
- Dejan Ljubičić, Robert Ljubičić (brother)
- Willy Meisl, Hugo Meisl (brother)
- Andreas Ogris, Ernst Ogris (brother)
- Gerald Piesinger, Simon Piesinger (son)
- Sebastian Prödl, Viktoria Schnaderbeck (cousin), David Schnaderbeck (cousin and brother of Viktoria),
- Herfried Sabitzer, Marcel Sabitzer (son), Thomas Sabitzer (nephew)
- Matthias Seidl, Simon Seidl (brother)
- Walter Schachner, Alexander Schachner (son)
- Markus Schopp, Christoph Urdl (nephew)
- Dejan Stanković, Marko Stanković (son)
- Pascal Stöger, Kevin Stöger (brother)
- Ivica Vastić, Toni Vastić (son)
- Thomas Weissenberger, Markus Weissenberger (brother), Philipp Weissenberger (brother)
- Patrick Zadrazil, Sarah Zadrazil (sister)
- Robert Žulj, Peter Žulj (brother)

== Azerbaijan ==
- Rufat Dadashov, Renat Dadaşov (brother)
- Isgandar Javadov, Vagif Javadov, Ilgar Gurbanov (nephews)
- Ozan Kökçü, (Turkey) Orkun Kökçü
- Badri Kvaratskhelia, (Georgia (country)) Khvicha Kvaratskhelia, (Georgia (country)) Tornike Kvaratskhelia (son)
- Kazemır Qudiyev, (Russia) Vitali Gudiyev (son)

== Belarus ==
- Alexander Hleb, Vyacheslav Hleb (brother)
- Mikhail Markhel, Yuri Markhel (brother)

== Belgium ==
- Michy Batshuayi, Aaron Leya Iseka (brother)
- Christian Benteke, Jonathan Benteke (brother)
- Gilbert Bodart, Arnaud Bodart (nephew)
- Pierre Braine, Raymond Braine (brother)
- Maximiliano Caufriez (see (Morocco) Selim Amallah)
- Leander Dendoncker, Lars Dendoncker (brother)
- Jean-François De Sart, Julien De Sart, Alexis De Sart (sons)
- Marc Emmers, Xian Emmers (son)
- Faris Haroun (see (Chad) Kévin Nicaise)
- Thierry Hazard, Carine Hazard (wife), Eden Hazard, Thorgan Hazard, Kylian Hazard (sons)
- Vincent Kompany, François Kompany (brother)
- Tom Lammens, Senne Lammens (brother)
- Stallone Limbombe, Anthony Limbombe, Bryan Limbombe (brothers)
- Romelu Lukaku, Jordan Lukaku (see (Democratic Republic of the Congo) Roger Lukaku)
- Marc Millecamps, Luc Millecamps (brother)
- Mbo Mpenza, Émile Mpenza (brother)
- Geoffrey Mujangi Bia, Adjani Mujangi Bia (son)
- Radja Nainggolan, Riana Nainggolan (twin sister)
- Divock Origi (see (Kenya) Mike Origi)
- Tristan Peersman, Kjell Peersman (son)
- Albert Sambi Lokonga (see (Democratic Republic of the Congo) Paul-José M'Poku)
- Hippolyte van den Bosch, Pieter van den Bosch (brother)
- Erwin Vandenbergh, Kevin Vandenbergh (son)
- Stan Vanden Eynde, Jack Van den Eynde (brother)
- François Van der Elst, Leo Van der Elst (brother)
- Marcel Van Vye, Eric Van Vyve (son), Sven Vermant (son-in-law of Eric), Romeo Vermant (great-grandson, son of Sven)
- Dante Vanzeir, Luna Vanzeir (sister)
- Jan Verheyen, Gert Verheyen (son)
- Dany Verlinden, Thibaud Verlinden (son)
- Marc Wilmots, Reno Wilmots, Marten Wilmots (sons)

== Bulgaria ==
- Sasho Angelov, Valeri Bojinov (stepson)
- Daniel Borimirov, Aleks Borimirov (son)
- Iliya Gruev, Ilia Gruev (son)
- Petar Hubchev, Hristofor Hubchev (nephew)
- Ivan Kolev, Todor Kolev (brother)
- Svetoslav Kovachev, Lachezar Kovachev (brother)
- Nikolay Krastev, Dimo Krastev (son)
- Biser Mihaylov, Borislav Mihaylov (son), Nikolay Mihaylov (son of Borislav)
- Veselin Minev, Yordan Minev (twin brother)
- Dimitar Penev, Lyuboslav Penev (nephew)
- Milen Petkov, Aleks Petkov (son)

== Cyprus ==
- Siniša Gogić, Alexandaros Gogić (son)
- Milenko Špoljarić, Alexander Špoljarić, Matija Špoljarić, Danilo Špoljarić (sons)
- Demetris Stylianou, Loukas Stylianou (twin brother)
- Kostas Vasiliou, Giorgos Vasiliou (son), Nikos Englezou (great-grandson)

== Czech Republic ==
- Jan Berger I, Jan Berger II, Tomáš Berger (sons), Patrik Berger (nephew)
- Louis Buffon (see (Italy) Lorenzo Buffon)
- Kamila Dubcová, Michaela Dubcová (twin sister)
- Martin Frýdek Sr., Martin Frýdek Jr., Christián Frýdek (sons)
- Petr Gabriel, Adam Gabriel, Šimon Gabriel (twin sons)
- Michal Hubník, Roman Hubník (brother)
- Karel Jarolím, Lukáš Jarolím, David Jarolím (sons), Marek Jarolím (nephew)
- Miroslav Kadlec, Michal Kadlec (son)
- Antonín Kinský Sr, Antonín Kinský Jr (son)
- Ján Kozák Sr., (Slovakia) Ján Kozák Jr. (son)
- Radoslav Látal, Radek Látal (son)
- Tomáš Necid, Simona Necidová (sister)
- Jiří Rosický Sr., Jiří Rosický Jr., Tomáš Rosický (sons)
- Lukáš Sadílek, Michal Sadílek (brother)
- René Twardzik, (Germany) Dan Twardzik (son), Filip Twardzik, Patrik Twardzik (twin sons)
- Alexander Vencel Sr., (Slovakia) Alexander Vencel Jr. (son)
- Ladislav Vízek, Vladimír Šmicer (son-in-law)
- Lucie Voňková (see (Netherlands) Mary van der Meer)
- Čestmír Vycpálek, Zdeněk Zeman (nephew)
- Vladimír Weiss I, (Slovakia) Vladimír Weiss II (son), (Slovakia) Vladimír Weiss III (grandson)

== Denmark ==
- Daniel Agger, Nicolaj Agger (cousin)
- Henrik Andersen, (Belgium) Kristoffer Andersen (son)
- Ove Flindt Bjerg, Christian Flindt Bjerg (son)
- Jan Bjur, Ole Bjur (brother), Peter Bjur (son)
- Christian Eriksen, Louise Eriksen (sister)
- Rasmus Højlund, Emil Højlund (brother), Oscar Højlund (brother/Emil's twin brother)
- Karen Holmgaard, Sara Holmgaard (twin sister)
- Henrik Jensen, Thomas Delaney (son-in-law), Mike Jensen (son)
- Niclas Jensen, Daniel Jensen (brother)
- Finn Laudrup, Ebbe Skovdahl (brother-in-law), Michael Laudrup (son), Brian Laudrup (son), Nicolai Laudrup (grandson/Brian's son), Mads Laudrup (grandson/Michael's son), Andreas Laudrup (grandson/Michael's son)
- Jan Mølby, Johnny Mølby (cousin)
- Lars Olsen, Ricki Olsen (son)
- Poul Pedersen, Viktor Fischer (grandson)
- Ebbe Sand, Peter Sand (twin brother), Emil Sand (Peter's son)
- Peter Schmeichel, Kasper Schmeichel (son)
- Kim Vilfort, Kasper Vilfort (nephew)

== Estonia ==
- Henri Anier, Hannes Anier (brother)
- Liis Emajõe, Riin Emajõe (sister)
- Enver Jääger, Enar Jääger (brother)
- Risto Kallaste, Ken Kallaste (son)
- Dzintar Klavan, Ragnar Klavan (son)
- Marko Kristal, Patrik Kristal (son)
- Evald Mikson, (Iceland) Jóhannes Eðvaldsson (son), (Iceland) Atli Eðvaldsson (son), (Iceland) Sif Atladóttir (granddaughter, Atli's daughter)
- Henrik Ojamaa, Hindrek Ojamaa (brother)
- Mart Poom, Markus Poom (son)
- Eino Puri, Sander Puri (twin brother)
- Sergei Ratnikov, Eduard Ratnikov and Daniil Ratnikov (sons)

== Faroe Islands ==
- Rannvá Biskopstø Andreasen, Ragna Biskopstø Patawary (twin sister), Jakup Andreasen (nephew)
- Andrias Edmundsson, Andrias Edmundsson (brother)
- Jens Martin Knudsen, Petur Knudsen (son)

== Finland ==
- Mika Aaltonen, Anton Aaltonen (son)
- Daniel Armstrong (see (England) / (Finland) Keith Armstrong)
- Göran Enckelman, Peter Enckelman (son)
- Alexei Eremenko, Roman Eremenko, Sergei Eremenko (see (Russia) Aleksei Yeryomenko)
- Rainer Forss, Tero Forss (son), Marcus Forss (grandson, son of Tero)
- Përparim Hetemaj, Mehmet Hetemaj (brother)
- Lukáš Hrádecký, Tomas Hradecký, Matej Hradecky (brothers)
- Toni Huttunen, Anttoni Huttunen (son)
- Aki Hyryläinen, Luka Hyryläinen (son)
- Atik Ismail, Adil Ismail (twin brother), Pele Koljonen (son),
- Petri Jakonen, Oskari Jakonen, Olli Jakonen (sons)
- Jussi Jääskeläinen, Will Jääskeläinen (son)
- Richard Olav Jensen, Fredrik Jensen (brother)
- Juho Kilo, Jesse Kilo (brother)
- Shefki Kuqi, Njazi Kuqi, Albert Kuqi (brothers)
- Lasse Lagerblom, Pekka Lagerblom (brother)
- Olavi Litmanen, Jari Litmanen (son)
- Adam Markhiyev (see (Russia) / (Finland) Umar Markhiyev)
- Niklas Moisander, Henrik Moisander (twin brother)
- Jussi Nuorela, Josep Nuorela (son)
- Patrick O'Shaughnessy, Daniel O'Shaughnessy (brother)
- Noah Pallas, Emil Pallas (brother)
- Petri Pasanen, Samuel Pasanen (son)
- Tommi Pikkarainen, Juhani Pikkarainen (son)
- Anton Popovitch (see (Russia) (Finland) Valeri Popovitch)
- Aki Riihilahti, Daniel Riihilahti (nephew)
- Riku Riski, Roope Riski (brother)
- Berat Sadik, Irfan Sadik (brother)
- Henri Sillanpää, Gabriel Sillanpää (son)
- Emmi Siren, Oona Siren (twin sister)
- Fredrik Svanbäck, Adrian Svanbäck (son)
- Pasi Tauriainen, Vesa Tauriainen, Kimmo Tauriainen (brothers), Julius Tauriainen, Jimi Tauriainen (sons)
- Robert Taylor (see (England) Paul Taylor)
- Sauli Väisänen, Leo Väisänen (brother)
- Simo Valakari, Paavo Valakari, Onni Valakari (sons)
- Niklas Vidjeskog, Adam Vidjeskog, Axel Vidjeskog, Isak Vidjeskog (sons)

== France ==
- Vincent Acapandié, (Madagascar) William Gros, Mathieu Acapandié (cousins)
- Seth Adonkor, Marcel Desailly (half-brother)
- Joris Ahlinvi, (Benin) Mattéo Ahlinvi (brother)
- Zana Allée, (Iraq) Ahmad Allée (brother)
- Morgan Amalfitano, Romain Amalfitano (brother)
- (France) (Guadeloupe) Jocelyn Angloma, (Guadeloupe) Johan Angloma (son)
- Thierry Audel, (Martinique) Johan Audel (brother)
- Loïc Badiashile, Benoît Badiashile (brother)
- Plaisir Bahamboula, (Republic of the Congo) Dylan Bahamboula, (Republic of the Congo) Jason Bahamboula (brothers) (Republic of the Congo) Yven Moyo (cousin)
- Richard Barroilhet, Jordan Barroilhet (brother), (Chile) Clemente Montes (cousin)
- Badradine Belloumou, Samir Belloumou, (Algeria) Inès Belloumou (siblings)
- Salim Ben Seghir, Eliesse Ben Seghir (brother)
- Mathieu Bodmer, Mathéo Bodmer (son)
- Basile Boli (see (Ivory Coast) Roger Boli)
- Maxime Bossis, Joël Bossis (brother)
- Jean-Alain Boumsong, Yannick Boumsong (brother), David Ngog (cousin)
- Rachid Bourabia, (Morocco) Mehdi Bourabia (brother)
- Eric Cantona, Joel Cantona (brother), Sacha Opinel (nephew)
- Cédric Carrasso, Johann Carrasso (brother)
- Delphine Cascarino, Estelle Cascarino (twin sister)
- Ilyes Chaïbi, (Algeria) Farès Chaïbi (brother)
- Bruno Cheyrou, Benoît Cheyrou (brother)
- Aly Cissokho (see (Senegal) Issa Cissokho)
- Daphne Corboz, (United States) Mael Corboz (brother), (United States) Rachel Corboz (sister), Michel Corboz (father)
- Carlos Curbelo, Gaston Curbelo (son)
- Stéphane Dalmat, (Collectivity of Saint Martin) Wilfried Dalmat (brother)
- Patrick Delamontagne, Laurent Delamontagne (brother)
- Henri Delaunay, Pierre Delaunay (son)
- Francis De Percin, (Martinique) Théo De Percin (son)
- Jean Djorkaeff, Youri Djorkaeff, Micha Djorkaeff (sons), Oan Djorkaeff (grandson/son of Youri)
- Désiré Doué, Guéla Doué (brother), Yann Gboho, Marc-Olivier Doué (cousins)
- Nabil Fekir, Yassin Fekir (brother)
- Gueïda Fofana, (Mauritania) Guessouma Fofana, (Mauritania) Mamadou Fofana (brother)
- André Frey, Raymond Frey (son), Sébastien Frey, Nicolas Frey (grandsons)
- Bernard Genghini, Benjamin Genghini (son)
- Alain Giresse, Thibault Giresse (son)
- Bafétimbi Gomis, (Senegal) Nampalys Mendy, (Guinea-Bissau) Alexandre Mendy (cousins)
- Maxime Gonalons, Lucas Camelo (cousin)
- Christian Gourcuff, Yoann Gourcuff (son)
- Antoine Griezmann (see (Portugal) Amaro Lopes (grandfather) )
- Josuha Guilavogui, (Guinea) Morgan Guilavogui (brother)
- Jean-François Hernandez, Lucas Hernandez, Théo Hernandez (sons)
- Daniel Horlaville, Christophe Horlaville (son)
- Olivier Kapo, Maxen Kapo (nephew)
- Fritz Keller, Curt Keller (brother)
- Désiré Koranyi (see (Hungary) Lajos Korányi)
- Alexandre Lacazette, Romuald Lacazette (cousin)
- Jean Laurent, Lucien Laurent (brother)
- Anthony Le Tallec, Damien Le Tallec (brother), Florent Sinama Pongolle (cousin)
- Fabrice Lepaul, Esteban Lepaul (son)
- Hugo Lloris, Gautier Lloris (brother)
- François Ludo, Éric Sikora (nephew)
- (France) (French Guiana) Florent Malouda, (French Guiana) Lesly Malouda (brother), (French Guiana) Kévin Rimane (cousin), Aaron Malouda (son of Florent)
- Steve Mandanda, (Democratic Republic of the Congo) Parfait Mandanda, (Democratic Republic of the Congo) Riffi Mandanda (brothers)
- Johan Martial, Anthony Martial (brother), Alexis Martial (cousin)
- Joris Marveaux, Sylvain Marveaux (brother)
- Rio Mavuba (see (Democratic Republic of the Congo) Ricky Mavuba)
- Kylian Mbappé, Ethan Mbappé (brother), (Democratic Republic of the Congo) Jirès Kembo Ekoko (adoptive brother)
- Griedge Mbock Bathy, Hiang'a Mbock (brother)
- Ferland Mendy (see (Senegal) Édouard Mendy)
- Nordi Mukiele, (Democratic Republic of the Congo) Nordan Mukiele, (Democratic Republic of the Congo) Norvin Mukiele (brother).
- Yohan M'Vila, Yann M'Vila (brother)
- Samir Nasri, Kaïs Nasri (cousin)
- Louisa Nécib, (Algeria) Liassine Cadamuro (husband)
- Abdelhakim Omrani, (Algeria) Billel Omrani (brother)
- Michael Olise, (England) Richard Olise (brother)
- Gérald Passi, Franck Passi (brother), (Republic of the Congo) Bryan Passi (nephew/son of Franck)
- Paul Pogba (see (Guinea) Florentin Pogba)
- Ángel Rambert, (Argentina) Sebastián Rambert (son)
- Hervé Revelli, Patrick Revelli (brother)
- Franck Ribéry, François Ribéry, Steeven Ribéry (brothers)
- Robert Rico, Jocelyn Rico (brother)
- Roger Rio, Patrice Rio (son)
- Laurent Robert, Bertrand Robert (brother), Thomas Robert (son)
- Omar Sahnoun, Nicolas Sahnoun (son)
- Guy Sénac, Didier Sénac (son)
- Noël Sinibaldi, Paul Sinibaldi, Pierre Sinibaldi (brothers)
- Oumar Solet, (Central African Republic) Isaac Solet (brother)
- Harouna Sy, (Senegal) Lamine Sy (brother)
- Moussa Sylla (see (Mali) Yacouba Sylla)
- Lilian Thuram, Marcus Thuram, Khéphren Thuram (sons), (Guadeloupe) Yohann Thuram-Ulien (cousin)
- José Touré (see (Mali) Bako Touré)
- Baba Traoré, (Mali) Cheick Traoré (brother)
- David Trezeguet (see (Argentina) Jorge Trezeguet)
- Pascal Vahirua (see (French Polynesia) Erroll Bennett)
- Tony Vairelles, Diego Vairelles, Giovan Vairelles (brothers), David Vairelles, Ludovic Vairelles (cousins)
- Raphaël Varane, Jonathan Varane (half-brother)
- Zinedine Zidane, Enzo Zidane, (Algeria) Luca Zidane, Théo Zidane, Elyaz Zidane (sons)
- Kurt Zouma (see (Central African Republic) Lionel Zouma)
- Georges Zvunka, Jules Zvunka, Victor Zvunka (brothers)

== Georgia ==
- Revaz Arveladze, Archil Arveladze (brother), Shota Arveladze (twin brother of Archil), Vato Arveladze (son of Revaz)
- Kakhaber Kacharava, Nika Kacharava (son)
- Antal Yaakobishvili, Áron Yaakobishvili (brother)

== Germany ==
- Rüdiger Abramczik, Volker Abramczik (brother)
- Karl Allgöwer, Ralf Allgöwer (brother)
- Klaus Allofs, Thomas Allofs (brother)
- Fatmire Alushi (see (Kosovo) Enis Alushi)
- Dirk Bakalorz, Marvin Bakalorz (son)
- Ridle Baku, Makana Baku (twin brother)
- Bertram Beierlorzer, Achim Beierlorzer (brother)
- Francis Banecki, Nicole Banecki (sister)
- Franz Beckenbauer, Stephan Beckenbauer (son), Luca Beckenbauer, Elias Beckenbauer (grandsons/Stephan's sons)
- Lars Bender, Sven Bender (twin brother)
- Willi Bierofka, Daniel Bierofka (son)
- Ann-Katrin Berger, (England) Jess Carter (wife)
- Philipp Bönig, Sebastian Bönig, Vincent Bönig (brothers)
- Herbert Burdenski, Dieter Burdenski (son), Fabian Burdenski (grandson/Dieter's son)
- Cacau, (Brazil) Vlademir (brother)
- Charly Dörfel, Bernd Dörfel (brother)
- Edwin Dutton (see (Scotland) James Quar McPherson)
- Stephan Engels, Mario Engels (son)
- Willi Fick, Hugo Fick (brother)
- Franco Foda, Sandro Foda (son)
- Bernd Förster, Karlheinz Förster (brother)
- Friedhelm Frontzeck, Michael Frontzeck (son)
- Friedhelm Funkel, Wolfgang Funkel (brother)
- Maurizio Gaudino, Gianluca Gaudino (son)
- Yannick Gerhardt, Anna Gerhardt (sister)
- Fabian Götze, Mario Götze, Felix Götze (brothers)
- Stephan Groß, Pascal Groß (son)
- Marcel Großkreutz, Kevin Großkreutz (cousin)
- Helmut Haller, Jürgen Haller (son), Christian Hochstätter (nephew)
- Matthias Hamann, Dietmar Hamann (brother)
- Uwe Helmes, Patrick Helmes (son)
- Bernd Hobsch, Patrick Hobsch (son)
- Uli Hoeneß, Dieter Hoeneß (brother), Sebastian Hoeneß (nephew/Dieter's son)
- Lewis Holtby, Joshua Holtby (brother)
- Hermann Hummels, Mats Hummels, Jonas Hummels (sons)
- Franz Islacker, Frank Islacker (son), Mandy Islacker (granddaughter/Frank's daughter)
- Ditmar Jakobs, Michael Jakobs (brother)
- Rolf Kahn, Axel Kahn, Oliver Kahn (sons)
- Thomas Kempe, Dennis Kempe, Tobias Kempe (sons)
- Isabel Kerschowski, Monique Kerschowski (twin sister)
- Sami Khedira, (Tunisia) Rani Khedira (brother)
- Ulf Kirsten, Benjamin Kirsten (son)
- Jürgen Klinsmann, (United States) Jonathan Klinsmann (son)
- Hans Klodt, Bernhard Klodt (stepbrother)
- Jürgen Klopp, Marc Klopp (son)
- Miroslav Klose (see (Poland) Josef Klose)
- Lukas Klostermann, Lisa Klostermann (sister)
- Harry Koch, Robin Koch (son)
- Andreas Köpke, Pascal Köpke (son)
- Erwin Kremers, Helmut Kremers (twin brother)
- Oliver Kreuzer, Niklas Kreuzer (son)
- Roland Kroos, Toni Kroos, Felix Kroos (sons)
- Günter Kuntz, Stefan Kuntz (son)
- Dieter Kurrat, Hans-Jürgen Kurrat (brother)
- Matthias Langkamp, Sebastian Langkamp (brother)
- Dzsenifer Marozsán (see (Hungary) János Marozsán)
- Martin Max, Philipp Max (son)
- Christoph Metzelder, Malte Metzelder (brother)
- Dominique Ndjeng, (Cameroon) Marcel Ndjeng (brother)
- Helmut Nerlinger, Christian Nerlinger (son)
- Tim Oberdorf, Lena Oberdorf (sister)
- Josef Posipal, Peer Posipal (son), Patrick Posipal (grandson/Peer's son)
- Helmut Rahn, George Boateng, (Ghana) Kevin-Prince Boateng (grandnephews), Jérôme Boateng (half-brother of George & Kevin-Prince)
- Oliver Reck, Daniel Reck, Gian-Luca Reck (sons), Pierre-Michel Lasogga (stepson)
- Max Reichenberger, Thomas Reichenberger (son)
- Alois Reinhardt, Dominik Reinhardt (son)
- Knut Reinhardt, Lasse Lehmann (son), Jens Lehmann (Lasse's stepfather)
- Karl-Heinz Riedle, Alessandro Riedle (son)
- Oskar Rohr, Gernot Rohr (grandnephew)
- Claude Rudy, Florian Rudy, Sebastian Rudy, Felix Rudy (sons)
- Wolfgang Rummenigge, Karl-Heinz Rummenigge, Michael Rummenigge (brothers), Marco Rummenigge (nephew/Michael's son)
- Leroy Sané (see (Senegal) Souleyman Sané)
- Célia Šašić (see (Croatia) Milan Šašić)
- Markus Schäfer, Marcel Schäfer (son)
- Fred Schaub, (Austria) Louis Schaub (son)
- Niels Schlotterbeck, Keven Schlotterbeck, Nico Schlotterbeck (nephews)
- Andreas Schmidt, Oliver Schmidt (twin brother)
- Mehmet Scholl, Lucas Scholl (son)
- Helmut Schön, Erwin Schön (brother)
- Christian Schreier, Toni Schreier (brother)
- Hannes Schröers, Jan Schröers (son), (Denmark) Jannik Vestergaard (grandson/Jan's nephew)
- Anton Schrobenhauser, Francisco Copado (son-in-law), Lucas Copado (Francisco's son), (Bosnia and Herzegovina) Hasan Salihamidžić (Francisco's brother-in-law)
- Günther Schuh, Timo Werner (son)
- Nico Schulz, Gian Luca Schulz (brother)
- Manfred Schwabl, Markus Schwabl (son)
- Alfred Schweinsteiger, Tobias Schweinsteiger, Bastian Schweinsteiger (sons)
- Erwin Seeler, Dieter Seeler, Uwe Seeler (sons), Levin Öztunalı (Uwe's grandson)
- Sahr Senesie, Antonio Rüdiger (half brother)
- Lukas Sinkiewicz, Michael Gardawski (cousin)
- Elia Soriano, (Italy) Roberto Soriano (brother)
- Rahman Soyudoğru, (Turkey) Ömer Toprak (cousin)
- Sandra Starke (see (Namibia) Manfred Starke)
- Bernhard Steffen, Horst Steffen (son)
- Hans Sturm, Ralf Sturm (son)
- Jonathan Tah, Mikael Baza (cousin)
- Michael Tarnat, Niklas Tarnat (son)
- Hans Tibulski, Otto Tibulski (brother)
- Heinz Toppmöller, Klaus Toppmöller (brother), Marco Toppmöller (son), Dino Toppmöller (nephew/Klaus' son)
- Rudi Völler, Kévin Völler-Adducci (son)
- Fritz Walter, Ludwig Walter, Ottmar Walter (brothers)
- Adolf Werner, August Werner (brother)
- Juliane Wirtz, Florian Wirtz (brother)
- Wolfgang Wolf, Arno Wolf (brother), Patrick Wolf (son)
- Pia Wunderlich, Tina Wunderlich (sister)
- Murat Yılmaz, (Turkey) Sefa Yılmaz (brother)
- Dieter Zorc, Michael Zorc (son)

=== East Germany ===
- Roland Ducke, Peter Ducke (brother)
- Lothar Kurbjuweit, (Germany) Tobias Kurbjuweit (son)
- Uwe Rösler, (Norway) Colin Rösler (son)
- Klaus Sammer, (Germany) Matthias Sammer (son)
- Eberhard Schuster, (Germany) Dirk Schuster (son)
- Wolfgang Seguin, (Germany) Paul Seguin (son), Norman Seguin (brother), Nick Seguin (son of Norman, nephew of Paul & grandson of Wolfgang)
- Hilmar Weilandt, (Germany) Tom Weilandt (son)
- Karl Wolf, Siegfried Wolf (brother)
- Wolfgang Wruck, Horst Wruck (brother)

== Gibraltar ==
- Allen Bula, Danny Higginbotham (nephew)
- Lee Casciaro, Ryan Casciaro (brother), Kyle Casciaro (brother)
- Joseph Chipolina, Kenneth Chipolina (brother)
- Anthony Hernandez, Andrew Hernandez (brother)
- Terrence Jolley, Ethan Jolley (son), Tjay De Barr (nephew & cousin of Ethan Jolley)

== Greece ==
- Georgios Donis, Christos Donis, Anastasios Donis (sons)
- Giannis Douvikas, Anastasios Douvikas (son)
- Anthimos Kapsis, Michalis Kapsis (son)
- Athanasios Kostoulas, Charalampos Kostoulas (son)
- Babis Intzoglou, Thanasis Intzoglou (brother), Lefteris Intzoglou (son)
- Kostas Giannoulis, Dimitris Giannoulis (brother)
- Stelios Manolas, Konstantinos Manolas (son), Kostas Manolas (nephew)
- Antonios Nikopolidis, Giannis Nikopolidis (son)
- Giannis Petrakis, Giorgos Petrakis (son)
- Ioannis Samaras, Georgios Samaras (son)
- Thanasis Saravakos, Dimitris Saravakos (son)
- Stelios Serafidis, Lambis Serafidis (brother)
- Apostolos Toskas, Grigoris Toskas (son)
- Panagiotis Vlachodimos, Odysseas Vlachodimos (brother)
- Giannis Vlantis, Stelios Skevofilakas (cousin), Giorgos Vlantis (son)

== Hungary ==
- Flórián Albert, Flórián Albert Jr. (son)
- József Bozsik, Péter Bozsik (son)
- Pál Dárdai Sr., Balázs Dárdai, Pál Dárdai Jr. (sons), Palkó Dárdai, Márton Dárdai, Bence Dárdai (grandsons/sons of Dárdai Jr.)
- Péter Disztl, László Disztl (brother), Dávid Disztl (nephew)
- Géza Turi, (Faroe Islands) Géza Dávid Turi (son)
- Lajos Korányi, Mátyás Korányi, (France) Désiré Koranyi (brothers)
- Krisztián Lisztes, Krisztián Lisztes Jr (son)
- János Marozsán, (Germany) Dzsenifer Marozsán (daughter)
- István Plattkó, Károly Plattkó, Ferenc Plattkó (brothers)
- Ferenc Puskás Sr., Ferenc Puskás (son)
- István Sallói, Dániel Sallói (son)
- Ádám Simon, András Simon (twin brother)
- Zoltán Stieber, András Stieber (brother)
- Zsolt Szoboszlai, Dominik Szoboszlai (son)
- Ottó Vincze, Gábor Vincze (brother)

== Iceland ==
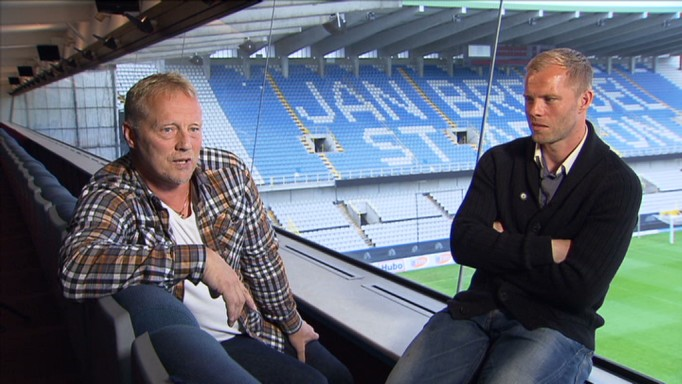
Arnór Gudjohnsen (left) with his son Eiður: both international forwards from Iceland

- Axel Óskar Andrésson, Jökull Andrésson (brother)
- Arnór Guðjohnsen, Eiður Guðjohnsen (son), Sveinn Aron Guðjohnsen, Andri Guðjohnsen, Daníel Guðjohnsen (grandsons, sons of Eiður)
- Albert Guðmundsson, Ingi Björn Albertsson (son), Guðmundur Benediktsson (Ingadóttir's husband), Albert Guðmundsson (great-grandson, son of Ingadóttir and Benediktsson)
- Arnar Gunnlaugsson, Bjarki Gunnlaugsson (twin brother)
- Viðar Halldórsson, Arnar Viðarsson (son), Davíð Viðarsson (son), Bjarni Viðarsson (son)
- Haraldur Ingólfsson, Jónína Víglundsdóttir (wife), Tryggvi Hrafn Haraldsson (son), Hákon Arnar Haraldsson (son)
- Rakel Karvelsson, (United States) Cole Campbell (son)
- Rúnar Kristinsson, Rúnar Alex Rúnarsson (son)
- Gylfi Sigurðsson, Karólína Lea Vilhjálmsdóttir (niece)
- Andri Sigþórsson, Kolbeinn Sigþórsson (brother), Amanda Andradóttir (Andri's daughter)
- Ragna Lóa Stefánsdóttir, Hermann Hreiðarsson (husband), Ída Marín Hermannsdóttir (daughter)
- Eyjólfur Sverrisson, Hólmar Örn Eyjólfsson (son)
- Guðjón Þórðarson, Þórður Guðjónsson (son), Bjarni Guðjónsson (son), Joey Guðjónsson (son), Björn Sigurðarson (half brother of Þórður, Bjarni and Joey), Ísak Bergmann Jóhannesson (grandon of Þórðarson, son of Joey Guðjónsson)
- Willum Þór Þórsson, Willum Þór Willumsson (son)
- Margrét Lára Viðarsdóttir, Elísa Viðarsdóttir (sister)

== Italy ==
- Beniamino Abate, Ignazio Abate (son)
- Ermanno Aebi, Giorgio Aebi (son)
- Nicola Amoruso, Luca Amoruso, Fabio Amoruso (brothers)
- Carlo Arcari, Angelo Arcari, Pietro Arcari, Bruno Arcari (brothers)
- Edoardo Artistico, Mario Artistico (brother), Gabriele Artistico (nephew, son of Mario)
- Manlio Bacigalupo, Valerio Bacigalupo (brother)
- Emilio Badini (see (Argentina) Angelo Badini)
- Roberto Baggio, Eddy Baggio (brother)
- Mario Balotelli, (Ghana) Enock Barwuah (brother)
- Giuseppe Baresi, Franco Baresi (brother), Regina Baresi (daughter)
- Alessandro Birindelli, Samuele Birindelli (son)
- Antonio Bocchetti, Salvatore Bocchetti (cousin)
- Ercole Bodini, Renato Bodini (brothers)
- Dario Bonetti, Ivano Bonetti (brother)
- Ernesto Borel, (France) Aldo Borel, Felice Borel (sons)
- Marco Borriello, Fabio Borriello (brother)
- Renato Brighenti, Sergio Brighenti (brother)
- Matteo Brighi (see (San Marino) Alessandro Brighi)
- Lorenzo Buffon, Gianluigi Buffon (grandnephew), (Czech Republic) Louis Buffon (great-grandnephew, Gianluigi's son)
- Alberto Cambiaghi, Michela Cambiaghi (daughter)
- Fabio Cannavaro, Paolo Cannavaro (brother), Adrian Cannavaro (nephew, son of Paolo)
- Guido Carboni, Amedeo Carboni (brother)
- Ernesto Castano, Giuseppe Castano (brother)
- Giorgio Chiellini, Claudio Chiellini (twins)
- Enrico Chiesa, Federico Chiesa (son)
- Antonio Conte, Gianluca Conte (brother)
- Bruno Conti, Andrea Conti, Daniele Conti (sons), Bruno Conti (grandson, son of Daniele)
- Guglielmo Cudicini, Fabio Cudicini (son), Carlo Cudicini (grandson, son of Fabio)
- Luigi De Agostini, Stefano De Agostini (cousin), Michele De Agostini (son)
- Gino De Vitis, Antonio De Vitis (son), Alessandro De Vitis (grandson, son of Antonio)
- Attilio Demaría, (Argentina) Félix Demaría (brother)
- Flavio Destro, Mattia Destro (son)
- Stefano Di Chiara, Alberto Di Chiara (brother), Diego Di Chiara (son of Stefano)
- Eusebio Di Francesco, Federico Di Francesco (son)
- Angelo Di Livio, Lorenzo Di Livio (son)
- Alfredo Di Stefano Sr., (Argentina) (Colombia) (Spain) Alfredo Di Stéfano (son)
- Antonio Donnarumma, Gianluigi Donnarumma (brother)
- Agostino Esposito, Salvatore Esposito, Sebastiano Esposito and Pio Esposito (sons)
- Otávio Fantoni (see (Brazil) Ninão)
- Giacomo Ferri, Riccardo Ferri (brother)
- Antonio Filippini, Emanuele Filippini (twins)
- Silvano Fontolan, Davide Fontolan (brother)
- Berardo Frisoni, Evaristo Frisoni (brother)
- Melania Gabbiadini, Manolo Gabbiadini (brother)
- Giovanni Galli, Niccolò Galli (son)
- Gennaro Gattuso, (Germany) Cataldo Cozza (cousin)
- Otmar Gazzari, Lorenzo Gazzari (brother)
- Sebastian Giovinco, Giuseppe Giovinco (brother)
- Vito Grieco, Roberto Grieco (son)
- Anfilogino Guarisi (see (Portugal) Manuel Augusto Marques)
- Antonio Insigne, Lorenzo Insigne, Roberto Insigne, Marco Insigne (brothers)
- Filippo Inzaghi, Simone Inzaghi (brother)
- Giovanni Kean, Moise Kean (brother)
- Spartaco Landini, Fausto Landini (brother)
- Cristiano Lucarelli, Alessandro Lucarelli (brother), Mattia Lucarelli (son of Cristiano), Matteo Lucarelli (son of Alessandro)
- Tommaso Maestrelli, Giuseppe Materazzi (father-in-law of Tommaso's son), Marco Materazzi, Matteo Materazzi (Giuseppe's sons), Andrea Maestrelli and Alessio Maestrelli (Tommaso & Giuseppe's grandsons)
- Renzo Magli, Augusto Magli (brother)
- Luigi Maldera, Attilio Maldera, Aldo Maldera (brothers), Andrea Maldera (son of Luigi)
- Cesare Maldini, Paolo Maldini (son), Christian Maldini, Daniel Maldini (grandsons, sons of Paolo)
- Antonio Manicone, (Switzerland) Carlo Manicone (son) Lorenzo Malagrida (nephew)
- Diego Maradona Jr. (see (Argentina) Diego Maradona)
- Luca Marchegiani, Gabriele Marchegiani (son)
- Gregorio Mauro, Massimo Mauro (brother)
- Valentino Mazzola, Sandro Mazzola, Ferruccio Mazzola (sons)
- Mario Menti, Umberto Menti, Romeo Menti (brothers), Luigi Menti (son of Mario)
- Domenico Morfeo, Mario Morfeo (brother)
- Eugenio Mosso (see (Argentina) Francisco Mosso)
- Alessandro Nesta, Gian Marco Nesta (nephew)
- Carlo Novelli, Alberto Novelli (brother)
- Antonio Paganin, Massimo Paganin (brother)
- Gianluca Pagliuca, Mattia Pagliuca (son)
- Emerson Palmieri (see (Brazil) Giovanni)
- Luca Pellegrini, Davide Pellegrini, Stefano Pellegrini (brothers)
- Gianluca Pessotto, Vanni Pessotto (brother)
- Gabriele Piccinini, Stefano Piccinini (brother)
- Alessandro Pierini, Nicholas Pierini (son)
- Edoardo Pierozzi, Niccolò Pierozzi (twins)
- Giampiero Pinzi, Riccardo Pinzi (son)
- Giorgio Repetto, Fabio Grosso (son-in-law), Filippo Grosso (grandson, son of Fabio)
- Eduardo Ricagni, (Greece) Eduardos Kontogeorgakis (son)
- Gianluigi Rigoni, Luca Rigoni, Nicola Rigoni (sons)
- Pierluigi Ronzon, Gianmarco Zigoni (grandnephew), Gianfranco Zigoni (Gianmarco's father)
- Giuseppe Rosetti, Gino Rossetti (brother)
- Giuseppe Savoldi, Gianluigi Savoldi (brother), Gianluca Savoldi (son)
- Juan Alberto Schiaffino (see (Uruguay) Raúl Schiaffino)
- Ennio Sentimenti, Arnaldo Sentimenti, Vittorio Sentimenti, Lucidio Sentimenti, Primo Sentimenti (brothers), Lino Sentimenti (cousin), Roberto Sentimenti (son of Lucidio), Andrea Sentimenti (nephew of Lino)
- Michele Serena, Riccardo Serena (son)
- Andrea Silenzi, Christian Silenzi (son)
- Roberto Soriano (see (Germany) Elia Soriano)
- Angelo Sormani, Adolfo Sormani (son)
- Enrico Spinosi, Luciano Spinosi (brother)
- Massimiliano Tacchinardi, Alessio Tacchinardi (brother)
- Salvatore Tedesco, Giovanni Tedesco, Giacomo Tedesco (brothers)
- Francesco Totti, Cristian Totti (son)
- Roberto Vieri, Christian Vieri, (Australia) Max Vieri (sons)
- Antonio Vojak, Oliviero Vojak (brother)
- Pino Wilson, James Walter Wilson (son)
- Walter Zenga, Jacopo Zenga, Andrea Zenga (sons)
- Cristian Zenoni, Damiano Zenoni (twin brother)
- Gianfranco Zola, Andrea Zola (son)

== Latvia ==
- Ilmārs Verpakovskis, Māris Verpakovskis (son)

== Liechtenstein ==
- Thomas Beck, Roger Beck (brother)
- Mario Frick, Yanik Frick (son)
- Rainer Hasler, Nicolas Hasler (son)
- Martin Stocklasa, Michael Stocklasa (brother)
- Marco Wolfinger, Sandro Wolfinger, Fabio Wolfinger (brothers)

== Lithuania ==
- Deividas Česnauskis, Edgaras Česnauskis (brother)
- Robertas Fridrikas, Mantas Fridrikas, (Austria) Lukas Fridrikas (sons)
- Aurimas Kučys, Armandas Kučys (son)

== Luxembourg ==
- Frank Deville, Maurice Deville (son)
- Théo Malget, Kevin Malget (son)
- Dejvid Sinani, Danel Sinani (brother)
- Serge Thill, Sébastien Thill (son), Olivier Thill (son), Vincent Thill (son)

== Malta ==
- Daniel Bogdanović, Ferdinando Apap (brother-in-law)
- Tony Cauchi, Denis Cauchi (son)
- Ryan Fenech, Roderick Fenech (brother)
- Joseph Mbong, Paul Mbong (brother)
- Chucks Nwoko, Udo Nwoko (brother), Kyrian Nwoko (son)
- Salvinu Schembri, Eric Schembri (son), André Schembri (grandson)

== Moldova ==
- Oleg Andronic, Gheorghe Andronic, Valeriu Andronic (cousin), Igor Andronic (cousin), Maxim Andronic (brother of Valeriu and Igor)
- Alexandru Antoniuc, Maxim Antoniuc (brother)
- Pavel Cebanu, Ilie Cebanu (son)
- Serghei Cleșcenco, Nicky Cleșcenco (son)
- Serghei Covalciuc, (Ukraine) Kyrylo Kovalchuk (brother)
- Ilie Damașcan, Vitalie Damașcan (brother)
- Sergiu Epureanu, Alexandru Epureanu (brother)
- Nicolae Mandrîcenco, Ivan Mandricenco (brother), Constantin Mandrîcenco, Dmitri Mandrîcenco (sons)
- Sergiu Plătică, Mihai Plătică (brother)

== Netherlands ==
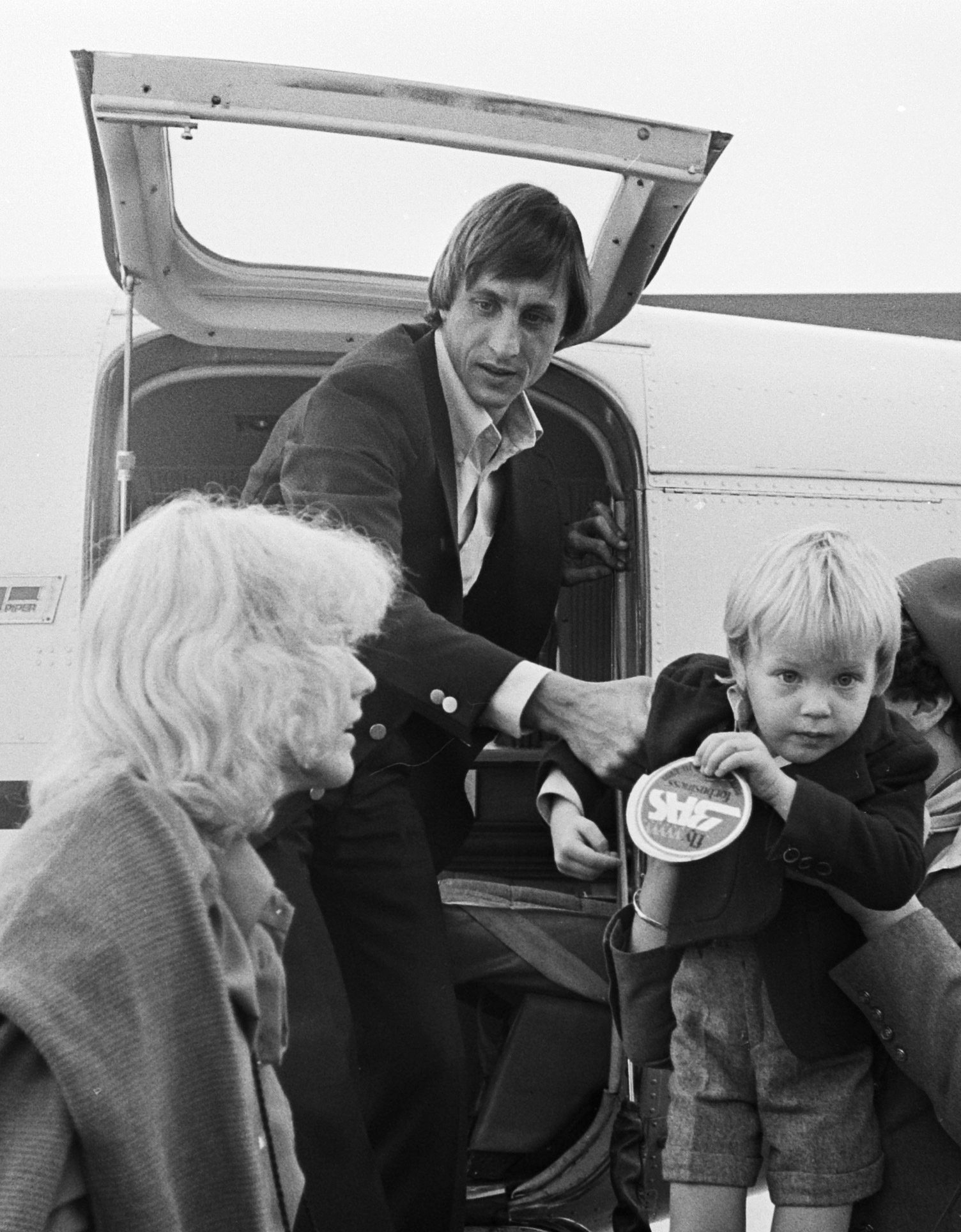
Johan Cruyff with his young son Jordi in 1977. Jordi would emulate Johan in playing for Ajax (as a youth), Barcelona and the Netherlands.

- Wim Anderiesen, Wim Anderiesen Jr. (son)
- Hennie Ardesch, Sander Westerveld (son-in-law), (Spain) Sem Westerveld (grandson/Sander's son)
- Frank Berghuis, Steven Berghuis (son)
- Dennis Bergkamp, Roland Bergkamp (nephew), Donny van de Beek (son-in-law)
- Wim Bleijenberg, Hans Bleijenberg (son)
- Danny Blind, Daley Blind (son)
- Frank de Boer, Ronald de Boer (twin brother), Calvin Stengs (son-in-law)
- Winston Bogarde, Danilho Doekhi, (Suriname) Melayro Bogarde, Lamare Bogarde (nephews)
- Peter Bosz, Sonny Bosz (son)
- Kevin Brobbey, (Ghana) Derrick Luckassen (brother), Brian Brobbey (cousin)
- Marciano Bruma, Jeffrey Bruma (brother), Kyle Ebecilio (cousin)
- Evert Jan Bulder, Jaap Bulder (brother)
- Johan Cruyff, Jordi Cruyff (son), (Spain) Jesús Angoy (son-in-law), (Spain) Jesjua Angoy-Cruyff (grandson)
- Edgar Davids, Lorenzo Davids (cousin)
- Daniëlle van de Donk, (Australia) Ellie Carpenter (wife)
- Royston Drenthe, (Suriname) Giovanni Drenthe (brother), Georginio Wijnaldum, Rajiv van La Parra, Giliano Wijnaldum (cousins), (Suriname) Tyrone Conraad (cousin)
- Urby Emanuelson, Jean-Paul Boëtius (see (Suriname) Errol Emanuelson)
- Jan Everse Sr, Jan Everse Jr (son), Coen Moulijn (cousin)
- Leroy Fer, Patrick van Aanholt (cousins)
- Alfons Fosu-Mensah, Timothy Fosu-Mensah, Paul Fosu-Mensah (brothers)
- Mannes Francken, Jacques Francken (brother)
- Janus van der Gijp, Wim van der Gijp, Cor van der Gijp (brothers), René van der Gijp (nephew/Wim's son), Dennis van der Gijp (nephew/Cor's son).
- Kenneth Goudmijn, Kenzo Goudmijn (son)
- Cees Groot, Henk Groot (brother)
- Ruud Gullit, Maxim Gullit (son)
- Jonathan de Guzmán (see (Canada) Julian de Guzman)
- Maurice van Ham, Jaap Stam (cousin)
- Cor van der Hart, Mickey van der Hart (grandson)
- Jimmy Floyd Hasselbaink (see (Suriname) Jacques Alex Hasselbaink)
- Dido Havenaar, (Japan) Mike Havenaar, (Japan) Nikki Havenaar (sons)
- Guus Hiddink, René Hiddink (brother)
- Pierre van Hooijdonk, Sydney van Hooijdonk (son)
- Donny Huijsen, (Spain) Dean Huijsen (son)
- Klaas-Jan Huntelaar, Koen Huntelaar (nephew)
- Kew Jaliens (see (Suriname) Kenneth Jaliens)
- Collins John, Paddy John, Ola John (brothers)
- Jerry de Jong, Nigel de Jong (son)
- Siem de Jong, Luuk de Jong (brother)
- Piet Keizer, Marcel Keizer (cousin)
- René van de Kerkhof, Willy van de Kerkhof (twin brother)
- Dolf Kessler, Boelie Kessler (brother), Tonny Kessler, Dé Kessler (cousins)
- Patrick Kluivert, Justin Kluivert (see (Suriname) Kenneth Kluivert)
- Martin Koeman, Ronald Koeman, Erwin Koeman (sons), Ronald Koeman Jr. (grandson/Ronald's son)
- Terence Kongolo, Rodney Kongolo, Fidel Kongolo (brothers)
- Teun Koopmeiners, Peer Koopmeiners (brother)
- Hans Kraay Sr., Hans Kraay Jr. (son)
- Kees Krijgh Sr., Kees Krijgh Jr. (nephew)
- André Krul, Tim Krul (brother)
- Noa Lang (see (Morocco) Nourdin Boukhari)
- Bert van Lingen, Vera Pauw (wife)
- Bert van Marwijk, Mark van Bommel (son-in-law), Thomas van Bommel (grandson/Mark's son)
- Rob Matthaei, (Indonesia) Marc Klok (nephew)
- Mary van der Meer, Claudia van den Heiligenberg (daughter), (Czech Republic) Lucie Voňková (daughter-in-law/Claudia's wife)
- Martijn Meerdink, Mexx Meerdink (son)
- Vivianne Miedema, Lars Miedema (brother)
- Harry Melis, Manon Melis (daughter)
- John Metgod, Edward Metgod (brother)
- Vivianne Miedema, Lars Miedema (brother)
- Keje Molenaar, Matthijs de Ligt (son-in-law)
- Ibad Muhamadu, (Suriname) Roland Alberg (brother), Lorenzo Ebecilio (nephew)
- Gerrie Mühren, Arnold Mühren (brother), Robert Mühren (nephew)
- Jan Mulder, Youri Mulder (son)
- Kiki Musampa, Nordin Musampa (nephew)
- Johan Neeskens, Ricky van Wolfswinkel (son-in-law)
- Dennis de Nooijer, Gérard de Nooijer (twin brother), (Curaçao) Jeremy de Nooijer, (Sint Maarten) Mitchell de Nooijer (sons of Dennis), Bradley de Nooijer (son of Gérard)
- Joop Odenthal, Cas Odenthal (grandson)
- Nigel Ogidi Nwankwo, (Suriname) Neville Ogidi Nwankwo (brother)
- Bas Paauwe Sr., Jaap Paauwe (brother), Bas Paauwe Jr. (son)
- Patrick Paauwe, Cees Paauwe (brother)
- Jan Pelser, Adriaan Pelser, Joop Pelser, Fons Pelser (brothers)
- Robin van Persie, Shaqueel van Persie (son)
- Jan Poortvliet, Jan Paul van Hecke (nephew)
- Jaap van Praag, Michael van Praag (son)
- Martin Reynders, Tijjani Reijnders, (Indonesia) Eliano Reijnders (sons)
- Karim Rekik, (Tunisia) Omar Rekik (brother)
- Jaïro Riedewald, (Suriname) Kenzo Riedewald (distant relative)
- Frank Rijkaard (see (Suriname) Herman Rijkaard)
- René Roord, Jill Roord (daughter)
- Edwin van der Sar, Joe van der Sar (son)
- Clarence Seedorf (see (Suriname) Johann Seedorf)
- Regillio Simons, Faustino Simons, Xavi Simons (sons)
- Harry Sinkgraven, Daley Sinkgraven (son)
- Jeffrey Sneijder, Wesley Sneijder, Rodney Sneijder (brothers)
- Simon Tahamata, Calvin Tahamata (brother), Michaël Tahamata, Petrus Tahamata (nephews)
- Jordan Teze, (Luxembourg) Aston da Silva (cousin)
- Jurriën Timber, Quinten Timber (see (Curaçao) Dylan Timber)
- Janny Timisela, Josephine Timisela (sister)
- Rafael van der Vaart, Damián van der Vaart (son)
- Gerald Vanenburg (see (Suriname) Roy Vanenburg)
- Jan Vennegoor of Hesselink, Lucas Vennegoor of Hesselink (son)
- Leen Vente, (Suriname) Dylan Vente (great-nephew)
- Frank Verlaat, Jesper Verlaat (son)
- Tonny Vilhena (see (Angola) Toy Vilhena)
- Aron Winter (see (Suriname) Ricardo Winter)
- Rob Witschge, Richard Witschge (brother), Dave Bulthuis (Richard's son-in-law)

== Northern Ireland ==
- Danny Blanchflower, Jackie Blanchflower (brother)
- Shea Charles, Pierce Charles (brother)
- Fay Coyle, Liam Coyle (son)
- Jonny Evans, Corry Evans (brother)
- Jim Feeney, Warren Feeney Sr. (son), Warren Feeney (grandson, son of Warren Sr.), (Wales) George Feeney (great-grandson, son of Warren Jr.)
- Danny Hale, (Republic of Ireland) Rory Hale, Ronan Hale (grandsons)
- Paul Kirk, Andy Kirk (son), Makenzie Kirk (grandson, son of Andy)
- Grant McCann, Ryan McCann (brother)
- Conor McLaughlin, Ryan McLaughlin (brother)
- Stephen Robinson, Harry Robinson (son)
- Kenny Shiels, Dean Shiels (son),
- Nigel Worthington, Brendan Rodgers (cousin), (Republic of Ireland) Anton Rodgers (son of Brendan)

== Norway ==
- Mohammed Abdellaoue, Mustafa Abdellaoue (brother), Omar Elabdellaoui (cousin), Jones El-Abdellaoui (cousin & brother of Omar)
- Yaw Ihle Amankwah, (Ghana) Emmanuel Frimpong (cousin)
- Jørn Andersen, (Germany) Niklas Andersen (son)
- Harald Berg, Knut Berg (brother), Ørjan Berg, Runar Berg, Arild Berg (sons), Patrick Berg (grandson/son of Ørjan) Sara Berg (granddaughter/daughter of Runar)
- Kristin Blystad-Bjerke, Trine Rønning (wife)
- Lars Bohinen, Emil Bohinen (son)
- Nils Arne Eggen, Knut Torbjørn Eggen (son)
- Tarik Elyounoussi, Mohamed Elyounoussi (cousin)
- Mohammed Fellah, (Morocco) Osame Sahraoui (nephew)
- Kjell Rune Flo, Jostein Flo, Jarle Flo, Tore André Flo (brothers), Ulrik Flo (son), Håvard Flo (cousin), Per-Egil Flo (nephew of Håvard)
- Terje Gulbrandsen, Solveig Gulbrandsen (daughter)
- Bjørn Gulden, Henrik Gulden (son)
- Alf-Inge Haaland, Erling Haaland (son), Jonatan Braut Brunes, Albert Tjåland (nephews)
- Hugo Hansen, Cato Hansen (son), Hege Hansen, Tuva Hansen (daughters)
- Andrine Hegerberg, Ada Hegerberg (sister), Thomas Rogne (Ada's husband)
- Kai Erik Herlovsen, Isabell Herlovsen (daughter)
- Jon Olav Hjelde, Leo Hjelde (son)
- Even Hovland, Stine Hovland (sister)
- Kjell Gunnar Ildhusøy, Celin Bizet (daughter), Aron Dønnum (son-in-law)
- Odd Iversen, Steffen Iversen (son)
- Jørn Jamtfall, Michael Jamtfall (son)
- Roald Jensen, Sondre Jensen (son), Roy Wassberg, (son-in-law), Niklas Jensen Wassberg (grandon, son of Roald)
- Truls Jenssen, Ruben Yttergård Jenssen, Ulrik Yttergård Jenssen (sons)
- Tor Gunnar Johnsen, Dennis Johnsen, Mikael Tørset Johnsen (sons)
- Anne Kitolano, Eric Kitolano, John Kitolano, Joshua Kitolano (brothers), Nema Kitolano (sister)
- Jon Knudsen, Mari Knudsen (sister),Magnus Knudsen (Son of Jon)
- Erik Mjelde, Maren Mjelde (sister)
- Roger Nilsen, Steinar Nilsen (brother)
- Moussa Njie, (Somalia) Bilal Njie (brother), (The Gambia) Momodou Lion Njie (cousin)
- Hans Erik Ødegaard, Martin Ødegaard (son)
- Erik Ruthford Pedersen, Kjetil Ruthford Pedersen, Steinar Pedersen (sons), Emil Pedersen (grandson/Steinar's son)
- Thomas Pereira, Adrian Pereira (son)
- Tore Reginiussen, Mads Reginiussen, Christian Reginiussen (brothers)
- John Arne Riise, Bjørn Helge Riise (brother)
- Terje Rise, Vilde Bøe Risa (daughter)
- Einar Rossbach, Sondre Rossbach (son)
- Ståle Solbakken, Markus Solbakken (son)
- Gøran Sørloth, Alexander Sørloth (son)
- Lene Storløkken, Hege Storløkken (sister)
- Erik Thorstvedt, Kristian Thorstvedt (son)
- Thomas Wæhler, Kristine Edner (wife)
- Hugues Wembangomo, Brice Wembangomo (brother)

== Poland ==
- Filip Bednarek, Jan Bednarek (brother)
- Józef Boniek, Zbigniew Boniek (son)
- Łukasz Broź, Mateusz Broź (brother)
- Paweł Brożek, Piotr Brożek (twin brother)
- Jerzy Brzęczek, Jakub Błaszczykowski (nephew)
- Adam Buksa, Aleksander Buksa (brother)
- Jacek Burkhardt, Marcin Burkhardt, Filip Burkhardt (sons)
- Matty Cash (see (England) Stuart Cash)
- Dariusz Drągowski, Bartłomiej Drągowski (son)
- Jerzy Dudek, Dariusz Dudek (brother)
- Dariusz Dźwigała, Jan Dźwigała (son), Adam Dźwigała (son of Dariusz & Brother of Jan), Michał Janota (cousin from Adam & Jan and nephew of Dariusz)
- Marek Gancarczyk, Janusz Gancarczyk, Mateusz Gancarczyk, Andrzej Gancarczyk, Waldemar Gancarczyk, Krzysztof Gancarczyk (brothers)
- Radosław Gilewicz, Konrad Gilewicz (son)
- Andrzej Iwan, Bartosz Iwan (son)
- Jan Jałocha, Marcin Jałocha (nephew)
- Roman Jańczyk, Wiesław Jańczyk (son)
- Josef Klose, (Germany) Miroslav Klose (son)
- Kazimierz Kmiecik, Grzegorz Kmiecik (son)
- Andrzej Kobylański, Martin Kobylański (son)
- Roman Kosecki, Jakub Kosecki (son)
- Roman Korynt, Tomasz Korynt (son)
- Jan Kotlarczyk, Józef Kotlarczyk (brother), Tadeusz Kotlarczyk (son)
- Jan Loth, Stefan Loth (brother)
- Krystian Michallik, (United States) Janusz Michallik (son)
- Piotr Mowlik, Mariusz Mowlik (son), David Topolski (nephew)
- Adam Musiał, Maciej Musiał, Tomasz Musiał (sons)
- Ryszard Robakiewicz, Józef Robakiewicz (brother), Zbigniew Robakiewicz (brother), Paweł Golański (nephew)
- Adrian Sikora, Mieczysław Sikora (brother)
- Włodzimierz Smolarek, Ebi Smolarek (son)
- Marek Świerczewski, Piotr Świerczewski (brother)
- Maciej Szczęsny, Wojciech Szczęsny (son)
- Mieczysław Szewczyk, Michał Szewczyk (son), Kamil Szewczyk (son)
- Mirosław Sznaucner, Maksymilian Sznaucner, Leon Sznaucner (sons)
- Stanisław Terlecki, Maciej Terlecki (son)
- Tomasz Wałdoch, Kamil Wałdoch (son)
- Robert Warzycha, Konrad Warzycha (son)
- Jerzy Wilim, Jan Wilim (brother)
- Piotr Włodarczyk, Szymon Włodarczyk (son)
- Ryszard Wyrobek, Jerzy Wyrobek (son)
- Tadeusz Zastawniak, Franciszek Zastawniak, Stanisław Zastawniak (brothers)
- Marcin Żewłakow, Michał Żewłakow (twin brother)
- Paweł Zieliński, Piotr Zieliński (brother)
- Michał Żyro, Mateusz Żyro (brother)

== Portugal ==
- José Águas, Rui Águas (son), Raul Águas (nephew)
- Carlos Alhinho, (Cape Verde) Alexandre Alhinho (brother)
- Bruno Alves (see (Brazil) Geraldo Assoviador)
- Carlos Alves, João Alves (grandson)
- António André, André André (son)
- Nuno Assis, Afonso Assis (son)
- Fábio Coentrão, Rui Coentrão (cousin)
- Sérgio Conceição, Sérgio Conceição Jr., Rodrigo Conceição, Francisco Conceição (sons)
- Cristiano Ronaldo, Cristiano Ronaldo Jr. (son)
- Deco (see (Brazil) Lela)
- Yannick Djaló, (Guinea-Bissau) José Embaló (cousin)
- Domingos, Gonçalo Paciência, Vasco Paciência (sons)
- Manuel Fernandes, (Switzerland) Gelson Fernandes (cousin of Manuel Fernandes, Cabral and Edimilson), (Switzerland) Edimilson Fernandes, (cousin of Gelson, Manuel and Cabral), (Switzerland) Cabral, (cousin of Edimilson, Manuel, and Gelson), Elton Monteiro, (cousin of Gelson, brother of Joël), (Switzerland) Joël Monteiro, (cousin of Gelson, brother of Elton), (Switzerland) Ulisses Garcia (cousin of Gelson), (Cape Verde) Dylan Tavares, Keyan Varela (cousins of the Fernandes', Garcia's and Tavares')
- Matilde Fidalgo, Bernardo Silva (cousin)
- Artur Fonte, José Fonte, Rui Fonte (sons)
- Fábio Fortes, (Cape Verde) Carlos Fortes (brother)
- Nuno Gomes, Tiago Ribeiro (brother)
- Ricardo Horta, André Horta (brother)
- Edgar Ié, (Guinea-Bissau) Edelino Ié (twin brother)
- João Mário (see (Angola) Wilson Eduardo)
- Diogo Jota, André Silva (brother)
- Laurindo, (Angola) Mauro (son)
- Amaro Lopes, (France) Antoine Griezmann (grandson)
- Miguel Lopes, Nuno Lopes (twin brother)
- Ariza Makukula (see (Democratic Republic of the Congo) Kuyangana Makukula)
- Maniche, Jorge Ribeiro (brother)
- Manuel Augusto Marques, (Brazil) (Italy) Anfilogino Guarisi (son)
- Gelson Martins, Euclides Cabral (cousin)
- Abel Miglietti (see (Mozambique) Zeca Miglietti)
- António Morato, António Morato, Jr. (son)
- Félix Mourinho, José Mourinho (son)
- Pedro Neto (see (Mozambique) Sérgio Lomba)
- Paulo Oliveira, Afonso Rodrigues (cousin)
- Fernando Peyroteo, Diogo Peyroteo (great-grandson), José Couceiro (grandnephew)
- João Pinto, Sérgio Pinto (brother), Tiago Pinto (son)
- Hélder Postiga, José Postiga (brother)
- Artur Quaresma, Alfredo Quaresma (cousin), Ricardo Quaresma (great-nephew of Artur and Alfredo)
- Ricardo Quaresma, Eduardo Quaresma (cousin)
- Samuel Quina, Domingos Quina (son)
- Renato Sanches (see (Cape Verde) Cláudio Tavares)
- Jorge Silva, Chico Silva (brother)
- Jorge Silva, Fábio Silva (son)
- António Sousa, Ricardo Sousa (son), Afonso Sousa, (grandson, son of Ricardo), José Sousa (nephew), (Cape Verde) Bruno Leite (son of José)
- José Taira, Afonso Taira (son)
- Silvestre Varela, Nilton Varela (nephew)
- António Veloso, Miguel Veloso (son)
- Pedro Venâncio, Frederico Venâncio (son)
- José Luís Vidigal (see (Angola) Beto Vidigal)

== Republic of Ireland ==
- Kwame Ampadu, (Wales) Ethan Ampadu (son)
- Frank Brady Sr., Pat Brady, Ray Brady, Frank Brady Jr., Liam Brady (great-nephews), Liam Brady Jr. (son of Liam)
- Robbie Brady, Gareth Brady (brother), Liam Brady (brother)
- Jason Byrne, Robbie Keane (cousin)
- Clive Clarke, Mason Melia (nephew)
- Rory Delap, (England) Liam Delap, (England) Finn Delap (sons)
- Christy Giles, Johnny Giles (son), (England) Nobby Stiles (Johnny's brother-in-law)
- Paddy Henderson, Dave Henderson (son), Stephen Henderson (son), Wayne Henderson (son), Stephen Henderson (grandson/Stephen's son)
- Marie Hourihan, Conor Hourihane (cousin)
- Stephen Hunt, Noel Hunt (brother)
- Alan Kelly Sr., Gary Kelly (son), Alan Kelly Jr. (son)
- Gary Kelly, Ian Harte (nephew)
- Con Martin, Mick Martin (son), Gerry Garvan (son-in-law), Owen Garvan (grandson/son of Gerry)
- Gary McCabe, Katie McCabe (sister)
- David O'Leary, Pierce O'Leary (brother)
- Alan Quinn, Stephen Quinn (brother), Keith Quinn (brother)
- John Russell, Julie-Ann Russell (sister)
- Paddy Turner, John Delamere (step-brother), (Australia) Callum Elder (grandson)
- Ronnie Whelan, Sr., Ronnie Whelan, Jr. (son), Paul Whelan (son)

== Romania ==
- George Bănuță, Alexandru Bănuță (son), Anne-Marie Bănuță (daughter)
- Daniel Boloca, Gabriele Boloca (brother)
- Liviu Ciobotariu, Denis Ciobotariu (son)
- Remus Câmpeanu, Septimiu Câmpeanu (nephew)
- Paul Cazan, Lucian Cazan (son)
- Florin Costea, Mihai Costea (brother)
- Mihai Drăguș, Denis Drăguș (son)
- Mircea Dridea, Virgil Dridea (brother)
- Cristian Dulca, Marco Dulca (son)
- Emil Dumitriu, Dumitru Dumitriu, Constantin Dumitriu (brothers)
- Liviu Goian, Dorin Goian, Lucian Goian (brothers)
- Gheorghe Hagi, Ianis Hagi (son)
- Anghel Iordănescu, Edward Iordănescu (son)
- Adrian Ilie, Sabin Ilie (brother)
- Mircea Lucescu, Răzvan Lucescu (son)
- Nicolae Lupescu, Ioan Lupescu (son)
- Silviu Lung, Tiberiu Lung (son), Silviu Lung Jr. (son)
- Virgil Mărdărescu, Gil Mărdărescu (son)
- Daniel Minea, Iulian Minea (brother)
- Dumitru Mitriță, Alexandru Mitriță (nephew)
- Ion Motroc, Florin Motroc (son)
- Gheorghe Mulțescu, Cătălin Mulțescu (son)
- Dumitru Munteanu, Anton Munteanu (twin brother)
- Mircea Neșu, Mihai Neșu (son)
- Ion Nunweiller, Lică Nunweiller, Radu Nunweiller (brothers)
- Costel Orac, Daniel Orac (nephew)
- Costel Pană, Marian Pană (brother)
- Florentin Petre, Patrick Petre (son)
- Victor Pițurcă, Alexandru Pițurcă (son)
- Iosif Rotariu, Dorin Rotariu (nephew)
- Lucian Sânmărtean, Dinu Sănmărtean (brother)
- Tudorel Stoica, Alin Stoica (son)
- Nicolae Tătaru, Gheorghe Tătaru (brother)
- Fănel Țîră, Cătălin Țîră (son)
- Vasile Zavoda, Francisc Zavoda (brother)

== Russia ==
- Dmitri Alenichev, Andrei Alenichev (brother)
- Aleksei Berezutski, Vasili Berezutski (twin brother)
- Vladimir Beschastnykh, Mikhail Beschastnykh (twin brother)
- Rinat Bilyaletdinov, Diniyar Bilyaletdinov (son)
- Vladimir But, Vitali But (brother)
- Vasily Butusov, (Soviet Union) Mikhail Butusov (brother)
- Dmitri Cheryshev, Denis Cheryshev (son)
- Gela Dzagoyev, Alan Dzagoev (brother)
- Vladimir Gabulov, Georgy Gabulov (brother)
- Mário Fernandes, (Brazil) Jô (brother)
- Sergey Vladimirovich Grishin, Sergey Sergeyevich Grishin (son)
- Aleksandr Kerzhakov, Mikhail Kerzhakov (brother)
- Dmitry Kharine, Mikhail Kharin (brother), Filipp Kharin (nephew)
- Dmitri Khokhlov, Igor Khokhlov (son)
- Sergei Kiriakov, Yegor Kiryakov (brother)
- Dmitri Kombarov, Kirill Kombarov (twin brother)
- Alan Kusov, Artur Kusov (brother)
- Kabir Kuzyayev, Adyam Kuzyayev (son), Ruslan Kuzyayev (grandson), Daler Kuzyayev (grandson)
- Umar Markhiyev, (Finland) Adam Markhiyev (son)ref/> Markhiyev is a Muslim.
- Aleksei Miranchuk, Anton Miranchuk (twin brother)
- Sergei Nekrasov, Igor Nekrasov (brother)
- Viktor Onopko, (Ukraine) Sergei Onopko (brother)
- Viktor Panchenko, Kirill Panchenko (son)
- Pavel Pogrebnyak, Kirill Pogrebnyak (brother)
- Danil Prutsev, Yegor Prutsev (brother)
- Sergey Ryzhikov, Andrei Ryzhikov (brother)
- Andrei Semak, Sergei Semak, Nikolai Semak (brothers)
- Aleksei Smertin, Evgeny Smertin (brother)
- Vladimir Tatarchuk, Vladimir Tatarchuk, Jr. (son)
- Andrey Tikhonov, Mikhail Tikhonov (son)
- Akhrik Tsveiba, Sandro Tsveiba (son)
- Aleksei Yeryomenko, (Finland) Alexei Eremenko (son), (Finland) Roman Eremenko (son), (Finland) Sergei Eremenko (son)
- Leonid Zolkin, Pavel Zolkin (brother)

== San Marino ==
- Manuel Battistini, Michael Battistini (brother)
- Pierluigi Benedettini, Simone Benedettini (son), Elia Benedettini (nephew)
- Tommaso Benvenuti, Giacomo Benvenuti (twin brother)
- Gianluca Bollini, Fabio Bollini (brother)
- Alessandro Brighi, (Italy) Matteo Brighi, (Italy) Marco Brighi, (Italy) Andrea Brighi (brothers)
- Alex Gasperoni, Bryan Gasperoni (brother)
- Enrico Golinucci, Alessandro Golinucci (brother)
- Mauro Marani, Michele Marani (brother)
- Paolo Mazza, Marco Mazza (brother)
- Danilo Rinaldi, Federico Rinaldi (brother) (see (Argentina) Cristian Menin)
- Aldo Simoncini, Davide Simoncini (twin brother)
- Fabio Tomassini, David Tomassini (brother)
- Fabio Vitaioli, Matteo Vitaioli (brother)

== Slovakia ==
- David Depetris, (Argentina) Rodrigo Depetris (brother)
- Emil Le Giang, (Vietnam) Patrik Le Giang (brother)
- Albert Rusnák Sr., Albert Rusnák Jr. (son)
- Jozef Jajcaj, Ľubor Jajcaj (son), Noel Jajcaj (grandson of Jozef & son of Ľubor)

== Soviet Union ==
- Sergei Pavlovich Baltacha, (Scotland) Sergei Baltacha, Jr. (son)
- Viktor Chanov, Sr., Vyacheslav Chanov (son), Viktor Chanov (son)
- Anatoli Davydov, (Russia) Dmitri Davydov (son)
- Grigory Fedotov, Vladimir Fedotov (son)
- Valery Gazzaev, Yuri Gazzaev (cousin)
- Nodar Khizanishvili, (Georgia (country)) Zurab Khizanishvili (son)
- Vladimir Kozlov, (Russia) Aleksei Kozlov (son)
- Viktor Kuznetsov, Sergei Kuznetsov (brother)
- Evgeny Lovchev, (Kazakhstan) Evgeniy Lovchev (son)
- Volodymyr Malyhin, (Russia) Aleksandr Malygin, (Ukraine) Yuriy Malyhin (sons)
- Aleksandr Novikov, (Russia) Kirill Novikov (son)
- Hennadiy Perepadenko, Serhiy Perepadenko (brother)
- Valeriy Petrakov, (Russia) Yuri Petrakov (son)
- Nikolai Savichev, Yuri Savichev (twin brother), (Russia) Daniil Savichev (son)
- Viktor Shustikov, (Commonwealth of Independent States) Sergey Shustikov (son), (Russia) Sergei Shustikov Jr. (grandson)
- Lev Yashin, (Russia) Vasili Frolov (grandson)

== Sweden ==
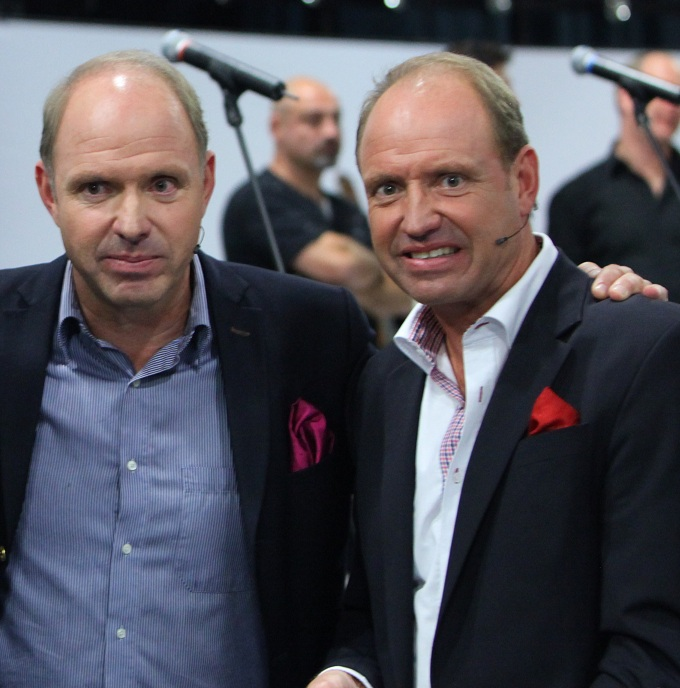
The Ravelli brothers, Thomas and Andreas, have a combined 184 caps for Sweden

- Sargon Abraham, (Syria) Elmar Abraham (brother)
- Mauricio Albornoz, (Chile) Miiko Albornoz (brother)
- Roy Andersson, Patrik Andersson (son), Daniel Andersson (son)
- Hans Andersson-Tvilling, Stig Andersson-Tvilling (twin brother)
- Ludwig Augustinsson, Jonathan Augustinsson (brother)
- Karl-Gunnar Björklund, Joachim Björklund (son), Kalle Björklund
- Johan Dahlin, Erik Dahlin (brother)
- Jimmy Durmaz, David Durmaz, Sharbel Touma (relatives)
- Yvonne Ekroth, Petronella Ekroth (daughter), Oliver Ekroth (son)
- David Elm, Viktor Elm (brother), Rasmus Elm (brother)
- Magnus Erlingmark, August Erlingmark (son)
- Hans Eskilsson, Malin Swedberg (wife), Williot Swedberg (son of Eskilsson and Swedberg)
- Jesper Ferm, Martin Ferm, Martin Ferm (cousins)
- Samuel Gustafson, Simon Gustafson (twin brother)
- Kristin Hammarström, Marie Hammarström (twin sister)
- Samuel Holmén, Sebastian Holmén (brother)
- Tord Holmgren, Tommy Holmgren (brother)
- Glenn Hysén, Tobias Hysén (son), Alexander Hysén (son), (England) Anton Hysén (son)
- Sebastian Jacobsson, Tobias Jacobsson (brother)
- Karl-Alfred Jacobsson, Frank Jacobsson (brother)
- Conny Karlsson, Jerry Carlsson (twin brother)
- Imad Khalili, Abdul Khalili, (Palestine) Moustafa Zeidan (cousins)
- Ove Kindvall, Niclas Kindvall (son)
- Ajsel Kujović, Emir Kujović (brother)
- Edvin Kurtulus, Bleon Kurtulus (brother)
- Henrik Larsson, Jordan Larsson (son)
- Daniel Larsson, Sam Larsson (brother)
- Anders Lewicki, Oscar Lewicki (son), Tobias Lewicki (nephew)
- Anders Linderoth, Tobias Linderoth (son)
- Jesper Ljunggren, Jonathan Ljunggren (brother)
- Frderik Martinsson, Mikael Martinsson (brother)
- Olof Mellberg, John Mellberg (son)
- Jim Nildén, David Nildén (son), Amanda Nildén (Jim's granddaughter, David's daughter)
- Per Nilsson, Joakim Nilsson (brother)
- Bertil Nordahl, Knut Nordahl (brother), Gunnar Nordahl (brother), Göran Nordahl (brother), Gösta Nordahl (brother), Thomas Nordahl (nephew/Gunnar's son)
- Joakim Olsson, Martin Olsson (brother)
- Marcus Olsson, Martin Olsson (twin brother)
- Rade Prica, Tim Prica (son)
- Andreas Ravelli, Thomas Ravelli (twin brother)
- Maic Sema, Ken Sema (brother)
- Johan Sundqvist, Jonathan Sundqvist (brother)
- Gary Sundgren, Daniel Sundgren (son)
- Stig Svensson, Tommy Svensson (son), Joachim Björklund (great-grandson) Kalle Björklund (great-great-grandson)
- Jonas Thern, Simon Thern (son)

== Switzerland ==
- Jean Abegglen, Max Abegglen, André Abegglen (brothers)
- Martin Andermatt, Nicolas Andermatt (son)
- Umberto Barberis, Sébastien Barberis (son)
- Nicolas Beney, Noémie Beney (sister), Roméo Beney (son), Iman Beney (daughter)
- Roman Bürki, Marco Bürki (brother)
- Pierre-Albert Chapuisat, Stéphane Chapuisat (son)
- David Degen, Philipp Degen (twin brother)
- Nico Elvedi, Jan Elvedi (twin brother)
- Alessandro Frigerio, Roberto Frigerio (son)
- Manuel Fernandes (see (Portugal) Manuel Fernandes)
- Alexander Frei, Stefan Frei (second-cousin)
- Ertan Irizik, Murat Yakin, Hakan Yakin (stepbrothers)
- Simon Lustenberger, Fabian Lustenberger (brother)
- Rémo Meyer, Leny Meyer (son)
- Nedim Omeragić, Bećir Omeragić (brother), Edin Omeragić (cousin)
- Roberto Rodríguez, Ricardo Rodríguez, Francisco Rodríguez (brothers)
- Christian Schwegler, Pirmin Schwegler (brother)
- Coumba Sow, Djibril Sow (cousin)
- Alain Sutter, René Sutter (brother), Nicola Sutter (nephew/René's son)
- Johan Vonlanthen, (Colombia) Henry Acosta (brother)
- Max Weiler, Walter Weiler (brother)

== Turkey ==
- Ayhan Akman, Hamza, Efe Akman (sons), Ali Akman (nephew)
- Mustafa Altıntaş, Yaşar Altıntaş (son), Yusuf Altıntaş (son), Batuhan Altıntaş (grandson, son of Yusuf)
- Hamit Altıntop, Halil Altıntop (twin brother)
- Ogün Altıparmak, Batur Altıparmak (son)
- Ali Artuner, Cenk Gönen (nephew)
- Kaan Ayhan, Mertcan Ayhan (brother)
- Fuat Buruk, Okan Buruk (brother)
- Hakan Çalhanoğlu, Muhammed Çalhanoğlu (brother), (Germany) Kerim Çalhanoğlu (cousin)
- Tolga Ciğerci, Tolcay Ciğerci (brother)
- Tanju Çolak, Yücel Çolak (brother)
- Ali Kemal Denizci, Osman Denizci (brother)
- Bülent Eken, Reha Eken (brother)
- Nail Elmastaşoğlu, Ayhan Elmastaşoğlu, Ayfer Elmastaşoğlu (brothers)
- Mehmet Ali Has, Şeref Has (brother)
- Muzzy Izzet, (England) Kemal Izzet (brother)
- Reşit Kaynak, İrfan Kaynak, Kayhan Kaynak, Ayhan Kaynak, Orhan Kaynak, İlhan Kaynak (brothers)
- Bülent Korkmaz, Mert Korkmaz (brother)
- Tayfun Korkut, Efe Korkut (son)
- İsmail Kurt, Metin Kurt (brother)
- Serdar Kurtuluş, Serkan Kurtuluş (brother)
- Ersen Martin, (Germany) Erkan Martin
- Erhan Önal, (Germany) Patrick Mölzl (son)
- Gökmen Özdenak, Yasin Özdenak (brother), Doğan Özdenak (brother)
- Coşkun Şahinkaya, Bülent Şahinkaya, Güngör Şahinkaya (brothers)
- Hasan Kamil Sporel, Zeki Rıza Sporel (brother)
- Serdar Topraktepe, Ömer Topraktepe (brother)
- Mesut Ünal, Enes Ünal (son)
- Murat Yıldırım, (Germany) Atilla Yıldırım (brother)
- Fikret Yılmaz, Burak Yılmaz (son)
- Semih Yuvakuran, Utku Yuvakuran (son)

== Ukraine ==
- Oleksandr Bondarenko, (Turkmenistan) Roman Bondarenko (twin brother), Taras Bondarenko (nephew, son of Roman)
- Oleksandr Pomazun, (Russia) Ilya Pomazun (son)

== Wales ==
- Ivor Allchurch, Len Allchurch (brother)
- Paul Bodin, Billy Bodin (son)
- Jason Bowen, Sam Bowen (son)
- John Charles, Mel Charles (brother), Jeremy Charles (nephew), Jake Charles (grandson of John)
- David Cotterill, Joel Cotterill (cousin)
- Ryan Giggs, Rhodri Giggs (brother), (Barbados) Curtis Hutson (cousin)
- Terry Hennessey, Wayne Hennessey (cousin)
- Frank Jackett, Kenny Jackett (son)
- Ken Leek, Karl Darlow (grandson)
- Donato Nardiello, (England) Gerry Nardiello (brother), Daniel Nardiello (son)
- Jason Koumas, Lewis Koumas (son)
- Josh Low, Joe Low (son)
- Chris Pike, Gareth Bale (nephew)
- Ian Rush, Owen Beck (great-nephew)
- Peter Rodon, Chris Rodon (son), Sam Rodon, Joe Rodon (grandsons, nephews of Chris)
- Dean Saunders, Callum Saunders (son)
- Robbie Savage, Charlie Savage (son)
- David Thomson, George Thomson (brother)
- John Toshack, Cameron Toshack (son)
- Mike Walker, (England) Ian Walker (son)
- Ivor Jones, Bryn Jones, Shoni Jones, Emlyn Jones (brothers), Bryn Jones, Cliff Jones (sons of Ivor), Ken Jones (son of Emlyn), Scott Neilson, (England) Matt Wells (grandsons of Cliff)
- Eric Young, (England) Paul Ince (cousin), (Trinidad and Tobago) Clayton Ince (cousin), (England) Tom Ince (cousin/Paul's son), (England) Rohan Ince (nephew)

== See also ==
- List of professional sports families
- List of family relations in American football
  - List of second-generation National Football League players
- List of association football (soccer) families
  - List of African association football families
  - List of European association football families
    - List of English association football families
    - List of former Yugoslavia association football families
    - List of Scottish football families
    - List of Spanish association football families
  - Category:Association football families
- List of Australian rules football families
- List of second-generation Major League Baseball players
- List of second-generation National Basketball Association players
- List of boxing families
- List of chess families
- List of International cricket families
- List of family relations in the National Hockey League
- List of family relations in rugby league
- List of international rugby union families
- List of professional wrestling families
