= Kees Krijgh =

Kees Krijgh may refer to:

- Kees Krijgh (footballer, born 1950), Dutch former professional footballer
- Kees Krijgh Sr. (1921–2007), Dutch footballer and uncle of above
