= Kurbjuweit =

Kurbjuweit is a surname. Notable people with the surname include:

- Dirk Kurbjuweit (born 1962), German journalist and author
- Lothar Kurbjuweit (born 1950), German football player
- Petra Kurbjuweit (born 1956), German gymnast
- Tobias Kurbjuweit (born 1982), German football player
