= Elmastaşoğlu =

Elmastaşoğlu is a Turkish surname. Notable people with the name include:

- Nail Elmastaşoğlu (born 1933), Turkish football forward
- Ayhan Elmastaşoğlu (born 1941), Turkish football midfielder
- Ayfer Elmastaşoğlu (born 1944), Turkish football midfielder and manager
