= Zvunka =

Zvunka is a surname of Romanian origin (Romanian language: Zvuncă). Notable people with the surname include:

- Georges Zvunka (born 1937), French footballer
- Jules Zvunka (born 1941), French footballer
- Victor Zvunka (born 1951), French footballer
