= Delphine Guehl =

French handball player (born 1978)

Personal information
- Nationality: French
- Born: 30 July 1978 (age 48) Metz, Moselle, France
- Height: 171 cm (67 in)

Sport
- Sport: Handball
- Position: Left wing
- Current club: Retired

Youth career
- Years: Team
- 1987-1993: Marly

Senior clubs
- Years: Team
- 1993-2002: ASPTT Metz
- 1993-2002: Cercle Dijon Bourgogne
- 1993-2002: Metz Handball
National team
Years	Team	Apps	(Gls)
2002-2008	France	63	(98)

Delphine Guehl (born 30 July 1978) is a French former handball player.

She was born in Metz, Moselle, France. She competed at the 2004 Summer Olympics, when France finished 4th.

She played almost her entire career at Metz Handball, except for a two-year period from 2002 to 2004, where she played for Cercle Dijon Bourgogne. She won the French championship 9 times with Metz Handball between 1997 and 2009.

She the niece of former football players Georges Zvunka, Victor Zvunka and Jules Zvunka, and the cousin of former handballer Corinne Zvunka-Krumbholz.

== Titles ==
- French Championship:
  - Winner: 1997, 1999, 2000, 2002, 2005, 2006, 2007, 2008, 2009
- Coupe de France:
  - Winner: 1998, 1999, 2010
- Coupe de la Ligue
  - Winner: 2005, 2006, 2007, 2008, 2009, 2010
