= Bosz =

Bosz is a Dutch surname. Notable people with the surname include:

- Gino Bosz (born 1993), Dutch football player, son of Peter and brother of Sonny
- Peter Bosz (born 1963), Dutch football manager and player
- Sonny Bosz (born 1990), Dutch football player
