= John Delamere =

John Delamere is the name of:

- John Delamere (footballer) (born 1956), Irish footballer
- John Delamere (politician) (born 1951), New Zealand politician

== See also ==
- John Delamare (c. 1320 – 1383), knight at the court of King Edward III of England
