= Gianluigi Rigoni =

Italian footballer (born 1956)

Personal information
- Full name: Gianluigi Rigoni
- Date of birth: September 19, 1956 (age 70)
- Place of birth: Cogollo del Cengio, Italy
- Position: Midfielder

Youth career
- Lanerossi Vicenza

Senior career*
Years	Team	Apps	(Gls)
1974–1976	Lanerossi Vicenza	1	(0)
1976–1978	AC Padova	2	(0)
1978–1979	Abano	?	(?)
????–1986	Giorgione	15+ (0+)	
- * Club domestic league appearances and goals

Gianluigi Rigoni (born 19 September 1956 in Cogollo del Cengio) is an Italian retired footballer. He played as a defender or midfielder. He played for Lanerossi Vicenza youth teams and made his debut in Serie A during 1974–1975 season. He then played for Padova in Serie C. Nowadays he managed Summaria, an amateur team based in Veneto. He is the father of Luca Rigoni and Nicola Rigoni.
