= Hennie Ardesch =

Dutch footballer (1943–2019)

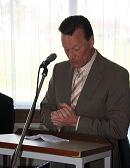

Personal information
- Full name: Hendrikus Ardesch
- Date of birth: 29 October 1943
- Place of birth: Enschede, Netherlands
- Date of death: 26 November 2019 (aged 76)
- Height: 1.85 m (6 ft 1 in)
- Position: Goalkeeper

Senior career*
Years	Team	Apps	(Gls)
1964–1965	Enschede	0	(0)
1965–1966	Twente	5	(0)
1966–1973	ADO Den Haag	11	(0)
1967	Golden Gate Gales	1	(0)
1973–1975	Twente	19	(0)
1975–1976	Go Ahead Eagles	5	(0)
1976–1977	VVV	9	(0)
Total		50	(ß)
- * Club domestic league appearances and goals

Hendrikus "Hennie" Ardesch (29 October 1943 – 26 November 2019) was a Dutch professional footballer who played as a goalkeeper.

== Career ==
Ardesch spent most of his career as backup goalkeeper, notably with ADO Den Haag from 1966 to 1967. Ardesch wanted to keep semi-professional status, as he focused on careers outside of football while he mostly trained with the reserves and youth teams of ADO. He made his debut with ADO in a 4–2 Eredivisie loss to Feyenoord on 24 September 1967, where he memorably let in a goal while suffering from a kidney stone. He almost signed with Atlético Madrid in 1971, but could not sign due to foreigner restrictions. On 12 March 1971, he was celebrated by ADO for his 250th appearance on the substitute bench.

== Death ==
Ardesch died of a heart attack on 26 November 2019 at the age of 76.

== Personal life ==
Ardesch's son-in-law Sander Westerveld, and grandson Sem Westerveld, are also professional football goalkeepers.
