= Josef Klose =

Polish footballer

Personal information
- Full name: Józef Klose
- Date of birth: 3 October 1947 (age 79)
- Place of birth: Sławięcice, Poland
- Position: Forward

Youth career
- Energetyk Sławięcice

Senior career*
Years	Team	Apps	(Gls)
1966–1978	Odra Opole	142	(36)
1978–1980	Auxerre	57	(11)
1981–1984	FC Chalon	57	(4)
Total		256	(51)
- * Club domestic league appearances and goals

Josef Klose (born 3 October 1947) is a Polish former footballer who played as a forward. He is the father of former German national striker and 2014 World Cup winner Miroslav Klose.

== Career ==
Klose began his career at Energetyk Sławięcice. From 1966, he was a forward for Odra Opole, winning the 1977 Polish League Cup and subsequently playing in the 1977–78 UEFA Cup. In November 1978, the year his son was born, he joined French side AJ Auxerre in Ligue 2. He helped them reach the 1979 Coupe de France final and win promotion in 1980 to Ligue 1, where he played 14 games, scoring twice. From 1981 to 1984, while already in his mid-thirties, he played for fourth league side FC Chalon.

== Personal life ==
He is married to Barbara Jeż, a former member of the Poland women's national handball team.

His family, of Silesian-German ancestry, had been German citizens in the Province of Upper Silesia (until 1945) and thus could resettle in West Germany as Aussiedler, which they did in 1985, settling down in Kusel.

== Honours ==
Odra Opole

- Polish League Cup: 1977
