= Anne-Marie Bănuță =

Romanian footballer (born 1991)

Personal information
- Date of birth: 16 November 1991 (age 34)
- Place of birth: Toulouse, France
- Height: 1.67 m (5 ft 6 in)
- Positions: Midfielder; forward

Team information
- Current team: Rodez

Senior career*
Years	Team	Apps	(Gls)
2007–2011	Toulouse	35	(5)
2011–2013	Saint-Étienne	27	(1)
2013–2020	Rodez	120	(22)
2020–2022	Brest	28	(5)
2022–2023	Nantes	20	(0)
2023–2024	Metz	20	(1)
2024–	Rodez	11	(0)

International career
2012–	Romania	4	(2)
- * Club domestic league appearances and goals as of 26 May 2024

Anne-Marie Bănuță (born 16 November 1991) is a footballer who plays as a forward for Seconde Ligue club Rodez. Born in France, she represents Romania at international level.

== Career ==
She previously played for Toulouse and Saint-Étienne.

She chose to play for the Romanian national team, and made her debut on 31 March 2012 scoring two goals against Kazakhstan.

== Personal life ==
Her brother Alexandru Bănuță is also a football player. Their father George Bănuță who emigrated to France, the same. She acquired French nationality on 21 September 2001, through the collective effect of her father's naturalization.

== Honours ==
=== Club ===
Saint-Étienne

- Coupe de France Féminine: runners-up 2012–13
