= Leonid Zolkin =

Russian footballer

Personal information
- Full name: Leonid Aleksandrovich Zolkin
- Date of birth: 1892
- Place of birth: Moscow, Russian Empire
- Date of death: 1958 (aged 65–66)
- Position: Striker

Senior career*
Years	Team	Apps	(Gls)
1912	Novogireyevo Moscow		
1913–1918	KS Orekhovo Orekhovo-Zuyevo		
1919–1920	KF Sokolniki Moscow		
1921–1923	Olimpiya Tashkent		
1924–1927	Komanda Goroda Tveri		

International career
1913	Russia	1	(0)
- * Club domestic league appearances and goals

Leonid Aleksandrovich Zolkin (Russian: Леонид Александрович Золкин; 1892–1958) was a Russian association football player. He was the brother of Pavel Zolkin.

== International career ==
Zolkin played his only game for the Russian Empire on May 4, 1913 in a friendly match against Sweden.
