= Bruno Mauro =

Angolan footballer

Personal information
- Full name: Bruno Mauro Nunes da Silva
- Date of birth: 3 October 1973 (age 53)
- Place of birth: Lisbon, Portugal
- Height: 1.80 m (5 ft 11 in)
- Position: Winger

Youth career
- 1990–1992: Belenenses
- 1992–1993: Ginásio Clube 1ºMaio Agualva
- 1993: → U. Almeirim (loan)

Senior career*
| Years | Team | Apps | (Gls) |
| 1993–1995 | Académico Viseu | 18 | (3) |
| 1994–1995 | → Naval (loan) | 28 | (11) |
| 1995–1996 | Farense | 3 | (0) |
| 1995–1996 | → Lamego (loan) | 19 | (0) |
| 1996–1997 | Covilhã | 21 | (1) |
| 1997–1999 | Torreense | 45 | (9) |
| 1999–2000 | Lusitânia | 17 | (6) |
| 2000–2001 | Penafiel | 40 | (13) |
| 2001–2003 | Paços de Ferreira | 47 | (10) |
| 2003–2004 | Belenenses | 29 | (4) |
| 2004–2005 | Estrela da Amadora | 19 | (1) |
| 2005–2006 | Ovarense | 0 | (0) |
| 2005–2006 | Acharnaikos | 12 | (0) |
| 2007–2008 | Santa Clara | 12 | (0) |
| 2008–2009 | Onisilos Sotira | 13 | (0) |

International career
| 2002–2004 | Angola | 11 | (3) |
- * Club domestic league appearances and goals

Bruno Mauro Nunes da Silva (born 3 October 1973), more commonly known as Bruno Mauro or just Mauro, is an Angolan former professional footballer who played as a winger. Mauro was a journeyman who played on various teams in Portugal, as well as Cyprus and Greece.

== Club career ==
Mauro is the son of Portugal international footballer Laurindo, who spent most of his career with Belenenses. He was born in Portugal but moved to Angola at the age of four with his family. He studied electrical engineering for a year before committing himself to football, returning to Portugal to jumpstart his career. He is noted for scoring a hat-trick against Sporting on 16 September 2002, ending their 28-game win streak.

== International career ==
Mauro was born in Portugal to Angolan parents. He played for the Angola national football team.
