= Salvinu Schembri =

Maltese footballer (1923–2008)

Personal information
- Date of birth: 19 October 1923
- Place of birth: Malta
- Date of death: 15 December 2008 (aged 85)
- Place of death: Msida, Malta
- Position: Inside forward

Senior career*
Years	Team	Apps	(Gls)
1943–1945	Sliema Wanderers		
1945–1953	Valletta		
1953–1960	Sliema Wanderers		
1960–1961	Ħamrun Spartans		

International career
1957–1958	Malta	3	(1)
- * Club domestic league appearances and goals

Salvinu Schembri (19 October 1923 – 15 December 2008) was a professional footballer who played as a inside forward for Sliema Wanderers, Valletta and Ħamrun Spartans. He also played in full international matches for the Malta national team.

== Club career ==
Schembri joined Sliema Wanderers in 1943 where he spent two seasons.

Schembri joined Valletta for the 1945–46 season. With Valletta he won the Maltese Premier League twice and between 1945 and 1948. In January 1947, in a tribute match between MFA XI and Yugoslav club Zaboversky played in his honour, Schembri sustained a serious injury. The injury kept him out of action for three months, after which he returned for an important league match against rivals Ħamrun Spartans on 11 May. He scored the decisive goal to win the match for Valletta.

In 1953, Schembri returned to former club Sliema Wanderers. In his second, seven-year spell at the club, he contributed to three championships, a Maltese FA Trophy, a Cassar Cup and two Scicluna Cups.

Schembri played one season with Ħamrun Spartans before retiring in 1961 due to a knee injury.

== International career ==
Schembri made 35 appearances for the MFA XI. On 24 February 1957, he captained the Malta national team in its first official international match against Austria which ended in 3–2 loss. He earned two further caps.

== Style of play ==
An inside forward, Schembri was known for his positioning and awareness, passing and goal-scoring ability.

== Personal life ==
Schembri is the father of former Malta international striker Eric Schembri and the grandfather of former Malta international attacking midfielder André Schembri.

He was inducted into the Maltese Olympic Committee's Hall of Fame in 2004.

Schembri died on 15 December 2008 at Mater Dei Hospital in Msida, at the age of 85. His funeral was held two days later on 17 December 2008.

== Honours ==
Valletta

- Maltese Premier League: 1945, 1947

Army & RAF

- Cassar Cup: 1950

Sliema Wanderers

- Maltese Premier League: 1953, 1955, 1956
- Maltese FA Trophy: 1955
- Cassar Cup: 1956
- Scicluna Cup: 1955, 1957

Malta XI

- Victory Cup: 1945

Individual

- Maltese Premier League top scorer: 1948 – 14 goals
