= Mieczysław Sikora =

Polish footballer

Personal information
- Full name: Mieczysław Sikora
- Date of birth: 6 February 1982 (age 44)
- Place of birth: Wisła, Poland
- Height: 1.68 m (5 ft 6 in)
- Position: Striker

Team information
- Current team: KS Nierodzim
- Number: 2

Youth career
- Czantoria Nierodzim

Senior career*
Years	Team	Apps	(Gls)
2000–2001	Kuźnia Ustroń		
2002–2003	Koszarawa Żywiec		
2003	Podbeskidzie Bielsko-Biała	16	(1)
2004	Odra Wodzisław	6	(0)
2005	Piast Gliwice	13	(0)
2006	Szczakowianka Jaworzno	12	(4)
2006–2007	Koszarawa Żywiec		
2007–2008	ŁKS Łódź	21	(0)
2008	Stal Głowno	1	(0)
2008	KSZO Ostrowiec	7	(3)
2009	Podbeskidzie	9	(1)
2009–2010	ŁKS Łódź	11	(0)
2010	Podbeskidzie II		
2011	Elana Toruń	12	(1)
2011–2013	Kuźnia Ustroń		
2013–2016	Rekord Bielsko-Biała		
2016–2017	Kuźnia Ustroń		
2017–2018	Spójnia Landek	29	(4)
2018–2021	Beskid Skoczów	60	(23)
2021	KS Nierodzim	3	(2)
2022–2023	KS Międzyrzecze	35	(11)
2023–2025	Beskid Skoczów	50	(10)
2025–	KS Nierodzim	24	(46)
- * Club domestic league appearances and goals as of 22:37, 22 June 2026 (UTC)

Mieczysław Sikora (born 6 February 1982) is a Polish footballer who plays as a striker for KS Nierodzim. He is the younger brother of fellow Polish footballer, Adrian Sikora.

== Honours ==
Kuźnia Ustroń

- Regional league Bielsko-Biała: 2016–17

Beskid Skoczów

- Regional league Bielsko-Biała: 2018–19

KS Międzyrzecze

- Klasa A Bielsko-Biała: 2021–22

KS Nierodzim

- Klasa B Skoczów: 2025–26
