= Eric Schembri =

Maltese footballer (born 1995)

Personal information
- Date of birth: 30 April 1955 (age 71)
- Place of birth: Malta
- Position: Striker

Team information
- Current team: Mdina Knights (technical director)

Senior career*
Years	Team	Apps	(Gls)
1974–1980	Gżira United		
- Sliema Wanderers

International career
1974–?	Malta	3	(0)

Managerial career
- 1999: Floriana
- 2006–2010: Mdina Knights
- 2010–: Mdina Knights (technical director)
- * Club domestic league appearances and goals

Eric Schembri (born 30 April 1955) was a professional footballer who played as a striker for Gżira United and Sliema Wanderers. He also played in full international matches for the Malta national team, including a UEFA Euro 1980 qualifying match against West Germany on 27 February 1980.

Following his playing career, Schembri became a football manager, leading Mdina Knights during the 2006 season. As of 2010, he was serving as Technical Director for the Knights.

== Personal life ==
Schembri is the son of former Sliema Wanderers and Malta international midfielder Salvinu Schembri, and is the father to Malta's international attacking midfielder André Schembri.
