= Günter Kuntz =

German footballer (1938–2026)

Personal information
- Date of birth: 28 November 1938
- Place of birth: Kaiserslautern, Gau Westmark, Germany
- Date of death: 12 July 2026 (aged 87)
- Position: Right winger

Senior career*
Years	Team	Apps	(Gls)
1957–1960	VfR Kaiserslautern		
1960–1968	Borussia Neunkirchen		
1968–1970	Austria Wien		
1970–1971	Borussia Neunkirchen		
Signature
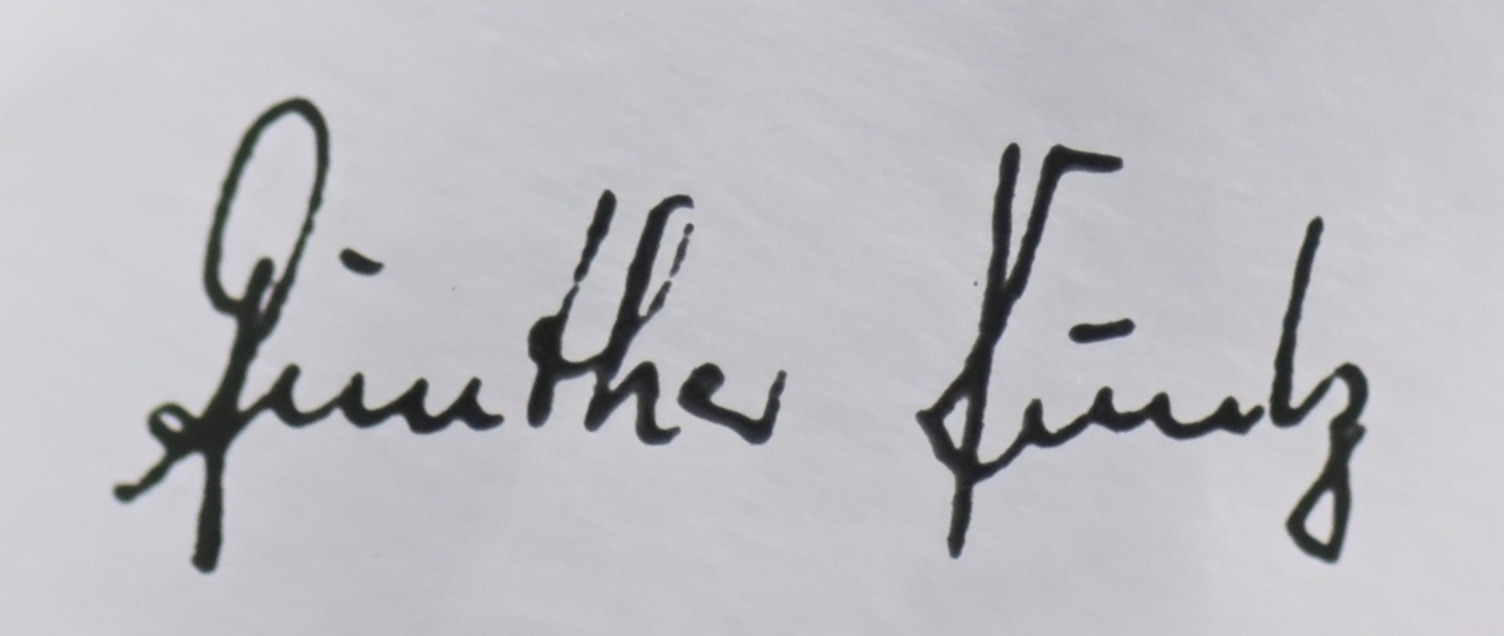
- * Club domestic league appearances and goals

Günter Kuntz (28 November 1938 – 12 July 2026) was a German footballer. He primarily played as a right winger for Borussia Neunkirchen in Germany and Austria Wien in Austria throughout the 1960s and the early 1970s. He is also the father of German international and 1. FC Kaiserslautern player Stefan Kuntz.

== Career ==
=== Oberliga ===
In the 1957–58 Oberliga, Günter Kuntz played his first thirteen games in the Südwest for VfR Kaiserslautern. He scored six goals, but the team from Erbsenberg was relegated to the 2nd division as the penultimate team in the table. Kuntz, who is usually used as a left winger, was immediately able to celebrate the championship in the II Division in the southwest and thus promotion. In his second season, during the 1959–60 Oberliga he played 27 games with six goals, but the club would end up relegated from the Oberliga with VfR Kaiserslautern.

Kuntz moved to Borussia Neunkirchen in Saarland for the 1960–61 Oberliga. In the last three rounds of the Oberliga era from 1961 to 1963, the Borussians from Ellenfeld with Kuntz as a forward won the runners-up title twice and were crowned champions of the Südwest in 1962. Alongside Elmar May, Paul Pidancet, top goalscorer Rudi Dörrenbächer with 37 goals and Karl Ringel, Neunkirchen won the southwest Südwest in 1962 with a goal difference of 102–29 and thus qualified into the final round of the German football championship. He made 51 appearances for Neunkirchen in the Oberliga, scoring 32 goals. After the Saarlanders had failed in 1961 in qualifying with 0–5 goals against Eintracht Frankfurt, Kuntz only made one appearance in 1962. In the 3–2 defeat against Schalke 04, he played as left winger for a few matches. In their third attempt for promotion in 1963, he played five games alongside May, Ringel, Horst Berg and Pidancet including the 3–0 home win against Hamburger SV as well as against 1860 Munich and Borussia Dortmund. In total, Kuntz played 108 games with 47 goals in the Oberliga Südwest from 1957 to 1963. In the final round, he made seven appearances.

=== Regionalliga ===
Since only 1. FC Kaiserslautern and 1. FC Saarbrücken from the southwest were nominated by the DFB for the newly founded Bundesliga for the inaugural 1963–64 season, Kuntz played with Neunkirchen in the Regionalliga Südwest in 1963–64. Throughout the season, Kuntz celebrated winning the championship in the Regionalliga, thus entering the promotion round and prevailing against the favorites Bayern Munich. On 20 June 1964, he scored the decisive goal in the 2–0 away win at Bayern with Sepp Maier playing for Bayern that match.

=== Bundesliga and Career in Austria ===
The team of coach Horst Buhtz improved its performance in the 1964–65 season by reaching 10th place. Kuntz made 20 appearances and contributed seven goals. In the following 1965–66 season, Kuntz increased his personal records with 28 appearances with 13 goals, but Neunkirchen were relegated to the Regionalliga at 17th place with Kuntz scoring 22 in his entire career in his Bundesliga career. However, the club would quickly win the championship in 1967 and once more achieved promotion to the Bundesliga in the promotion round. Kuntz was often in action in the runners' line with Erich Leist and Dieter Schock. Coach Željko Čajkovski mostly relied on the formation of Kuntz, Erich Hermesdorf and Wolfgang Gayer in the midfield throughout the 1967–68 season. Kuntz recorded 32 games with two goals in the 1967–68 Bundesliga when the Black and Whites from Ellenfeld were relegated back to the Regionalliga in 17th place. After relegation, Kuntz moved to Austria to Austria Wien and celebrated winning the title twice in 1969 and 1970. He played 53 games for Austria in the league, in which he scored 16 goals. In the 1969–70 European Cup, he played in both games against Dynamo Kiev.

For the 1970–71 season, Kuntz returned to Borussia Neunkirchen in the Regionalliga Südwest and won the championship again with coach Kurt Sommerlatt and the outstanding midfielder Gerd Zewe. In the promotion round, however, the veteran, who had recently acted as a libero, made no appearances and shortly retired soon after.

== Personal life and death ==
Kuntz later married his wife, Christa, and had two sons, including Stefan, who also became a footballer. Like his father, he also began his career with Neunkirchen, with Gunter himself attending the inaugural match of the season. He remained active with the club through his involvement in various functions from assistant coach to match committee chairman.

Kuntz died on 12 July 2026, at the age of 87.

== Bibliography ==
- Skrentny, Werner, ed. (1996). Teufelsangst vorm Erbsenberg: die Geschichte der Oberliga Südwest 1946 - 1963 (1. Aufl ed.). Essen: Klartext. ISBN 978-3-88474-394-2.
- Homann, Ulrich (1990). Höllenglut an Himmelfahrt. Die Geschichte der Aufstiegsrunden zur Fußballbundesliga 1963–1974. Essen: Klartext. ISBN 3-88474-346-5.
- Weinrich, Matthias (1998). Enzyklopädie des deutschen Ligafußballs. 35 Jahre Bundesliga. Teil 1. Die Gründerjahre 1963–1975. Geschichten, Bilder, Aufstellungen, Tabellen. Vol. 3. Kassel: AGON Sportverlag. ISBN 3-89784-132-0.
