= Franciszek Zastawniak =

Polish footballer

Personal information
- Date of birth: 13 August 1905
- Place of birth: Gdów, Austria-Hungary
- Date of death: 16 November 1966 (aged 61)
- Place of death: Kraków, Poland
- Height: 1.74 m (5 ft 9 in)
- Position: Defender

Senior career*
Years	Team	Apps	(Gls)
1923–1929	Cracovia		

International career
1927–1928	Poland	2	(0)

Managerial career
- 1937: Cracovia
- * Club domestic league appearances and goals

Franciszek Zastawniak (13 August 1905 – 16 November 1966) was a Polish footballer who played as a defender. He made two appearances for the Poland national team from 1927 to 1928.

== Honours ==
Cracovia

- Ekstraklasa: 1937
