= Henri Sillanpää =

Finnish footballer (born 1979)

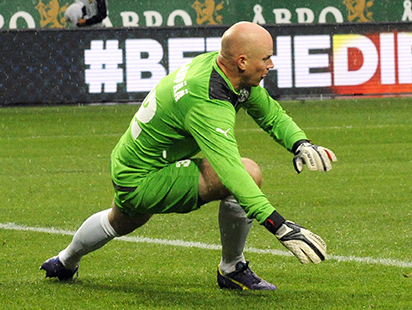
- Sillanpää with VPS in 2015

Personal information
- Full name: Henri Sillanpää
- Date of birth: 4 June 1979 (age 47)
- Place of birth: Tornio, Finland
- Height: 1.89 m (6 ft 2 1/2 in)
- Position: Goalkeeper

Team information
- Current team: VPS (assistant manager)

Youth career
- VPS
- TP-47
- Visan Pallo

Senior career*
Years	Team	Apps	(Gls)
1998–2002	VPS	78	(0)
2001	→ Kiisto (loan)	1	(0)
2002	→ Närpes Kraft (loan)	7	(0)
2003	TP-47	26	(0)
2004–2005	AC Allianssi	49	(0)
2006–2010	VPS	95	(0)
2010–2012	GAIS	32	(0)
2012	→ Tromsø (loan)	2	(0)
2013–2016	VPS	80	(0)
2020	BK-48		

International career^{‡}
1999–2000	Finland U21	3	(0)
2004–2012	Finland	6	(0)

Managerial career
- 2016–2021: VPS (gk coach)
- 2022–: VPS (assistant)
- * Club domestic league appearances and goals as of 23 October 2013 ‡ National team caps and goals as of 28 August 2012

Henri Sillanpää (born 4 June 1979) is a Finnish football coach and a former professional footballer who is currently working as an assistant manager of Vaasan Palloseura (VPS).

== International career ==
He made his debut for the Finnish national team on 3 December 2004 in a friendly match against Oman.

== Personal life ==
His son Gabriel Sillanpää is also a professional footballer who plays for VPS.

== Career statistics ==
=== Club ===
As of 1 September 2024.

Appearances and goals by club, season and competition
Club	Season	League			Cup (Note: Includes Suomen Cup)		League cup		Europe		Total	
Club	Season	Division	Apps	Goals	Apps	Goals	Apps	Goals	Apps	Goals	Apps	Goals
VPS	1998	Veikkausliiga	3	0	–		–		0	0	3	0
VPS	1999	Veikkausliiga	10	0	–		–		1 (Note: Appearance(s) in UEFA Cup)	0	11	0
VPS	2000	Veikkausliiga	31	0	–		–		–		31	0
VPS	2001	Veikkausliiga	26	0	–		–		–		26	0
VPS	2002	Veikkausliiga	8	0	–		–		–		8	0
VPS	Total		78	0	0	0	0	0	1	0	79	0
Kiisto (loan)	2001	Kakkonen	1	0	–		–		–		1	0
Närpes Kraft (loan)	2002	Ykkönen	7	0	–		–		–		7	0
TP-47	2003	Ykkönen	26	0	–		–		–		26	0
AC Allianssi	2004	Veikkausliiga	26	0	–		–		2	0	28	0
AC Allianssi	2005	Veikkausliiga	23	0	–		–		4	0	27	0
AC Allianssi	Total		49	0	0	0	0	0	6	0	55	0
VPS	2006	Veikkausliiga	24	0	–		–		–		24	0
VPS	2007	Veikkausliiga	25	0	–		–		–		25	0
VPS	2008	Veikkausliiga	25	0	1	0	–		–		26	0
VPS	2009	Veikkausliiga	20	0	0	0	4	0	–		24	0
VPS	Total		94	0	1	0	4	0	0	0	99	0
GAIS	2010	Allsvenskan	1	0	2	0	–		–		3	0
GAIS	2011	Allsvenskan	15	0	2	0	–		–		17	0
GAIS	2012	Allsvenskan	16	0	0	0	–		–		16	0
GAIS	Total		32	0	4	0	0	0	0	0	36	0
Tromsø (loan)	2012	Tippeligaen	2	0	0	0	–		–		2	0
VPS	2013	Veikkausliiga	30	0	3	0	4	0	–		37	0
VPS	2014	Veikkausliiga	17	0	1	0	7	0	0	0	25	0
VPS	2015	Veikkausliiga	33	0	1	0	4	0	2 (Note: Appearances in UEFA Europa League)	0	40	0
VPS	Total		80	0	5	0	15	0	2	0	102	0
Career total			369	0	10	0	19	0	9	0	407	0

=== International ===
As of 6 June 2012

Finland national team
Year	Apps	Goals
2004	1	0
2005	1	0
2006	2	0
2008	1	0
2012	1	0
Total	6	0

== Honours ==
Individual

- Veikkausliiga Goalkeeper of the year: 2013
