= Laurindo =

Portuguese footballer

Personal information
- Full name: Eduardo Laurindo da Silva
- Date of birth: 30 September 1944 (age 82)
- Place of birth: Portugal
- Position: Forward

Senior career*
Years	Team	Apps	(Gls)
1967–1973	Belenenses	127	(29)
1973–1975	Porto	24	(6)
1975–1976	Beira-Mar	20	(7)

International career
1969	Portugal	1	(0)
- * Club domestic league appearances and goals

Eduardo Laurindo da Silva (born 30 September 1944) is a Portuguese former footballer who played as a forward. He spent most of his career with Belenenses.

== Career ==
Laurindo made his professional debut on 12 May 1968 for Belenenses in a 4–0 win over Sporting.

Laurindo was born in Portugal to Angolan parents. His sole appearance for the Portugal national team was in a friendly 0-0 tie with Mexico on 6 April 1969.

== Personal life ==
Laurindo is the father of Angola international footballer Mauro, who also played for Belenenses. He sold all he had and left Portugal for Angola, with his sons Mauro and Hector, to help rebuild the country.
