= Alexandru Bănuță =

Romanian footballer

Alexandru Bănuţă
Personal information
- Full name: Marian-Alexandru Bănuţă
- Date of birth: 13 August 1986 (age 40)
- Place of birth: Bucharest, Romania
- Height: 1.75 m (5 ft 9 in)
- Position: Midfielder

Youth career
- Toulouse

Senior career*
Years	Team	Apps	(Gls)
2005–2006	Balma SC		
2007–2008	Ceahlăul Piatra Neamţ	12	(0)
2008–2009	Perpignan		
2009–2010	Toulouse Fontaines Club	8	(0)
2010	SS Saint-Louisienne		
2010–2011	JS Saint-Pierroise		
2011–2013	Juventus București	19	(1)
2013–2014	OC Perpignan		
2014–2015	Angoulême	23	(1)
- * Club domestic league appearances and goals

Marian-Alexandru Bănuţă (born 13 August 1986) is a Romanian former professional footballer who played as a midfielder.

== Career ==
Bănuţă was born in Bucharest, Romania, and moved to Toulouse, France, around 1991.

He played on the professional level in the Romanian Liga I for FC Ceahlăul Piatra Neamţ.

== Personal life ==
His father George Banuta was also a footballer who migrated to France. Banuta's sister Anne Marie plays for Saint-Étienne. He acquired French nationality on 21 September 2001, through the collective effect of his father's naturalization.
