= Gabriel Sillanpää =

Finnish footballer (born 2005)

Personal information
- Date of birth: 8 September 2005 (age 21)
- Place of birth: Finland
- Height: 1.84 m (6 ft 0 in)
- Position: Centre back

Youth career
- VPS

Senior career*
Years	Team	Apps	(Gls)
2020–2023	VPS II	17	(0)
2022–2023	VPS	2	(0)

International career^{‡}
2022	Finland U18	2	(0)
- * Club domestic league appearances and goals as of 21 February 2024 ‡ National team caps and goals as of 21 February 2024

Gabriel Sillanpää (born 8 September 2005) is a Finnish professional football player who plays as a centre back.

== Personal life ==
His father Henri Sillanpää is a former professional football goalkeeper, and is currently working as an assistant manager of VPS.
