= Pavel Zolkin =

Russian footballer

Personal information
- Full name: Pavel Aleksandrovich Zolkin
- Date of birth: 1894
- Date of death: 1962 (aged 67–68)
- Position: Striker

Senior career*
Years	Team	Apps	(Gls)
1912–1916	Novogireyevo Moscow		
1917–1922	Sokolnichesky Klub Lyzhnikov Moscow		
1923	Mossovet Moscow		
1924	Krasnye Khamovniki Moscow		

International career
1913	Russia	1	(0)
- * Club domestic league appearances and goals

Pavel Aleksandrovich Zolkin (Russian: Леонид Александрович Золкин) (born 1894; died 1962) was an association football player. He was the brother of Leonid Zolkin.

== International career ==
Zolkin played his only game for Russia on May 4, 1913 in a friendly against Sweden.
