= Paddy Turner =

Irish footballer (1939–2026)

Personal information
- Full name: Patrick Turner
- Date of birth: 20 April 1939
- Place of birth: Dublin, Ireland
- Date of death: 14 November 2026 (aged 87)
- Place of death: Dublin, Ireland
- Position: Inside right

Senior career*
Years	Team	Apps	(Gls)
1957–1960	Shamrock Rovers	23	(10)
1960–1961	Shelbourne	19	(2)
1961–1963	Morton	41	(19)
1963–1964	Celtic	7	(1)
1964–1966	Glentoran	32	(7)
1966–1972	Dundalk	142	(54)
1972–1973	Bohemians	17	(5)

International career
1963–1964	Republic of Ireland	2	(0)
- * Club domestic league appearances and goals

Patrick Turner (20 April 1939 – 14 November 2026) was an Irish footballer. He was an inside right who played for Shamrock Rovers, Shelbourne, Morton, Celtic, Glentoran, Dundalk and Bohemians. On the international front he won two full caps for the Republic of Ireland national team, his first cap coming in a 1–0 home win for Ireland over Scotland on 9 June 1963.

== Career ==
Turner won a League of Ireland winners medal with Shamrock Rovers in 1958–59 and made two appearances in European competition for Rovers before signing for Shels in August 1960.

He signed for Celtic from Morton in May 1963. The former Shelbourne and Shamrock Rovers inside right had played for Morton before making his debut for Celtic in a 3–0 loss to Rangers at Parkhead in a League Cup tie on 8 August. Turner's time at Celtic coincided with Bobby Murdoch playing in the same position, resulting in Turner making 14 appearances before joining Glentoran after a year.

While at The Oval (Belfast) he scored against Panathinaikos in the 1964–65 European Cup.

In November 1972, he signed for Bohs from Dundalk on a free transfer. He made 17 league appearances in Bohs colours scoring 5 goals before he left the club at the end of the 1972–73 season. He also netted the first goal in Bohemians 3–1 win over Shamrock Rovers in the 1973 Leinster Senior Cup Final.

== Personal life and death ==
Turner died at St. Vincent's University Hospital in Dublin, on 14 November 2026, at the age of 87.

His step-brother John Delamere was also a footballer. His grandson, Callum Elder, also became a footballer.

== Honours ==
Shamrock Rovers

- League of Ireland: 1958–59

Dundalk

- League of Ireland: 1966–67

Bohemians

- Leinster Senior Cup: 1973

== Sources ==
- Dundalk F.C. profile
