= Florian Rudy =

German footballer (born 1989)

Personal information
- Date of birth: January 7, 1989 (age 37)
- Place of birth: Villingen, West Germany
- Position: Striker

Team information
- Current team: SV Heimstetten

Youth career
- –2004: VfB Stuttgart
- 2004–2005: 1. FC Kaiserslautern
- 2005–2007: 1899 Hoffenheim
- 2007–2008: Karlsruher SC

Senior career*
Years	Team	Apps	(Gls)
2008–2012	FC 08 Villingen	103	(31)
2012–2013	SpVgg Unterhaching II	22	(6)
2012–2013	SpVgg Unterhaching	6	(0)
2013–	SV Heimstetten	32	(5)
- * Club domestic league appearances and goals as of July 2, 2014

Florian Rudy (born January 7, 1989) is a German footballer who plays as a striker for SV Heimstetten. He is the brother of Sebastian Rudy.

== Career ==
Rudy played as a youth for four of southwest Germany's top clubs (VfB Stuttgart, 1899 Hoffenheim, 1. FC Kaiserslautern and Karlsruher SC), but it was with FC 08 Villingen of the Oberliga Baden-Württemberg that he made his breakthrough in senior football. He spent three and a half years with the club, making over a hundred appearances, before joining SpVgg Unterhaching of the 3. Liga in January 2012. He made his debut for the club a month later, as a substitute for Ömer Kanca in a 5–1 defeat to Chemnitzer FC, and made a further five appearances before the end of the season. After making no appearances during the first half of the 2012–13 season, he joined Regionalliga Bayern side SV Heimstetten on a six-month loan in January 2013. At the end of the season, the move was made permanent.
