= Sem Westerveld =

Spanish footballer (born 2002)

Personal information
- Date of birth: 18 July 2002 (age 24)
- Place of birth: San Sebastián, Spain
- Height: 1.93 m (6 ft 4 in)
- Position: Goalkeeper

Team information
- Current team: Zaragoza
- Number: 1

Youth career
- Ajax Cape Town
- –2016: HC & FC Victoria
- 2016–2021: AZ

Senior career*
Years	Team	Apps	(Gls)
2021–2026	Jong AZ	39	(0)
2025–2026	→ MVV (loan)	38	(0)
2026–	Zaragoza	0	(0)
- * Club domestic league appearances and goals as of 28 April 2026

Sem Westerveld (born 18 July 2002) is a Spanish professional footballer who plays as a goalkeeper for Primera Federación – Group 2 club Real Zaragoza.

== Career ==
Westerveld made his professional debut with Jong AZ in a 1–0 Eerste Divisie loss to Roda on 4 January 2021. On 18 June 2021, he signed his first professional contract with AZ for three years.

He suffered a torn cruciate knee ligament in 2024 and spent a year out of action. He returned to the Jong AZ team for a match against Vitesse in April 2025, in a 2–2 draw.

On 2 July 2025, Westerveld joined Eerste Divisie club MVV on a one-season loan. He quickly established himself as a key figure for MVV, producing a series of decisive performances that included a penalty save in a goalless draw away to Jong Ajax. Having struggled with injuries for much of the previous two and a half years, he described the run of form as a personal breakthrough after a "long, dark period".

On 6 July 2026, Westerveld returned to his birth nation and signed a three-year contract with Real Zaragoza in Primera Federación.

== Personal life ==
Westerveld was born in Spain to a Dutch family, as his father was playing football in the country at the time. His father Sander Westerveld and grandfather Hennie Ardesch were also professional football goalkeepers. Sem was born in San Sebastián, Spain while his father was playing for Real Sociedad. Sem holds dual Spanish and Dutch citizenship and is a fluent Spanish speaker.

== Career statistics ==
As of match played 25 April 2026

Appearances and goals by club, season and competition
Club	Season	League			Cup		Other		Total	
Club	Season	Division	Apps	Goals	Apps	Goals	Apps	Goals	Apps	Goals
Jong AZ	2020–21	Eerste Divisie	5	0	—		—		5	0
Jong AZ	2021–22	Eerste Divisie	17	0	—		—		17	0
Jong AZ	2022–23	Eerste Divisie	13	0	—		—		13	0
Jong AZ	2023–24	Eerste Divisie	2	0	—		—		2	0
Jong AZ	2024–25	Eerste Divisie	3	0	—		—		3	0
Jong AZ	Total		40	0	—		—		40	0
MVV (loan)	2025–26	Eerste Divisie	38	0	1	0	—		39	0
Real Zaragoza	2026–27	Primera Federación	0	0	0	0	—		0	0
Career total			78	0	1	0	0	0	79	0
