= Tadeusz Zastawniak =

Polish footballer

Personal information
- Date of birth: 29 August 1907
- Place of birth: Gdów, Austria-Hungary
- Date of death: 16 February 1956 (aged 48)
- Place of death: Kraków. Poland
- Height: 1.67 m (5 ft 6 in)
- Positions: Defender; midfielder

Senior career*
Years	Team	Apps	(Gls)
1923–1933	Cracovia		
1934–1935	Polonia Warsaw		

International career
1925–1928	Poland	8	(0)
- * Club domestic league appearances and goals

Tadeusz Zastawniak (29 August 1907 – 16 February 1956) was a Polish footballer.

He earned eight caps for the Poland national team from 1925 to 1928.

== Honours ==
Cracovia

- Ekstraklasa: 1930, 1932
