= Cogollo del Cengio =

- Comune
- Comune di Cogollo del Cengio
- Location within Italy Location within Veneto
- Coordinates: 45°47′N 11°25′E
- Country: Italy
- Region: Veneto
- Province: Vicenza (VI)
- Frazioni: Casale, Follon, Mosson, Schiri

Government
  - Mayor: Piergildo Capovilla

Area
  - Total: 36.22 km^{2} (13.98 sq mi)
- Elevation: 310 m (1,020 ft)

Population (30 June 2017)
  - Total: 3,243
  - Density: 89.54/km^{2} (231.9/sq mi)
- Demonym(s): Cogollesi, Mossonari
- Time zone: UTC+1 (CET)
  - Summer (DST): UTC+2 (CEST)
- Postal code: 36010
- Dialing code: 0445
- Patron saint: St. Christopher
- Saint day: 25 July
- Website: Official website

Cogollo del Cengio is a town in the province of Vicenza, Veneto, Italy. It is north of SP 350 provincial road.

== Twin towns ==
Cogollo del Cengio is twinned with:

- Mauthausen, Austria, since 1999

== Sources ==
- (Google Maps)
