= Jules Zvunka =

French footballer and manager (born 1941)

Personal information
- Date of birth: 17 August 1941 (age 85)
- Place of birth: Le Ban-Saint-Martin, France
- Height: 1.78 m (5 ft 10 in)
- Position: Defender

Senior career*
Years	Team	Apps	(Gls)
1960–1966	Metz	173	(15)
1966–1973	Marseille	250	(0)

Managerial career
- 1974–1976: Marseille
- 1977: Marseille
- 1978–1980: Marseille
- 1983–1984: Aix
- * Club domestic league appearances and goals

Jules Zvunka (born 17 August 1941) is a retired French football player and manager.

He is the brother of Georges Zvunka and Victor Zvunka and played for Metz and Olympique Marseille. He is the uncle of handballer Delphine Guehl.
