= Tobias Kurbjuweit =

German footballer

Personal information
- Full name: Tobias Kurbjuweit
- Date of birth: 30 December 1982 (age 43)
- Place of birth: Jena, East Germany
- Height: 1.71 m (5 ft 7 in)
- Positions: Midfielder; forward

Team information
- Current team: Hertha BSC II (Assistant manager)

Youth career
- 1994–2000: Carl Zeiss Jena

Senior career*
Years	Team	Apps	(Gls)
2000–2002	Carl Zeiss Jena	28	(6)
2002–2003	FC St. Pauli	13	(1)
2003–2004	Mainz 05 II	12	(1)
2004–2005	1. FC Magdeburg	33	(13)
2005–2006	Union Berlin	23	(6)
2007	Tennis Borussia Berlin	13	(2)
2007–2008	1. FC Gera 03	16	(4)
2008–2010	Berliner FC Dynamo	51	(8)
2010–2011	Carl Zeiss Jena	18	(1)
2011	Chemnitzer FC	3	(0)
2011–2012	Berliner FC Dynamo	15	(3)
Total		225	(45)
- * Club domestic league appearances and goals

Tobias Kurbjuweit (born 30 December 1982) is a German former professional footballer who played as a midfielder or forward.

== Career ==
Kurbjuweit was born in Jena. He made his professional debut in the German 3. Liga against 1. FC Heidenheim on 24 July 2010.

== Personal life ==
Tobias is the son of former footballer and current director of sport of FC Carl Zeiss Jena Lothar Kurbjuweit.
