= Nail Elmastaşoğlu =

Turkish footballer (born 1933)

Personal information
- Full name: Nail Elmastaşoğlu
- Date of birth: 1933
- Place of birth: İzmir, Turkey
- Height: 1.74 m (5 ft 9 in)
- Position: Forward

Senior career*
Years	Team	Apps	(Gls)
1959–1965	Altay		
1965–1967	Altınordu		
- * Club domestic league appearances and goals

Nail Elmastaşoğlu (born 1933) is a Turkish former professional footballer. Elmastaşoğlu's brothers, Ayhan and Ayfer, were also professional footballers.
