= Lothar Kurbjuweit =

German footballer (born 1950)

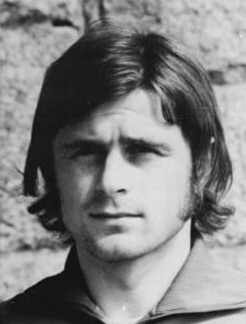
- Kurbjuweit in 1974

Personal information
- Birth name: Lothar Kurbjuweit
- Date of birth: 6 November 1950 (age 76)
- Place of birth: Riesa, East Germany
- Height: 1.80 m (5 ft 11 in)
- Position: Defender

Youth career
- 1959–1965: BSG Traktor Seerhausen
- 1965–1968: BSG Stahl Riesa

Senior career*
Years	Team	Apps	(Gls)
1968–1970	BSG Stahl Riesa	35	(5)
1970–1983	Carl Zeiss Jena	299	(21)
1983–1984	Hallescher FC Chemie	23	(0)
Total		357	(26)

International career
1967–1969	East Germany U18 (de)	29	(1)
1969–1972	East Germany U23	9	(0)
1979–1980	East Germany U21	8	(1)
1972–1976	East Germany Olympic	13	(1)
1970–1981	East Germany	66	(4)

Managerial career
- 1984: Carl Zeiss Jena II (assistant coach)
- 1984–1989: Carl Zeiss Jena
- 1990–1991: Rot-Weiß Erfurt
- 1992–1996: Carl Zeiss Jena U19
- 1996–1999: Carl Zeiss Jena (chairman)
- 2003–2004: VfB Pößneck
- 2005: VfB Pößneck
- 2006–2009: 1. FC Nürnberg (scout)
- 2010–2011: Carl Zeiss Jena (sporting director)
- 2011–2014: Carl Zeiss Jena II
- 2011: → Carl Zeiss Jena (interim)
- 2014: Carl Zeiss Jena
Medal record
Representing East Germany
Men's football
Bronze medal – third place	1972 Munich	Team competition
Gold medal – first place	1976 Montreal	Team competition
- * Club domestic league appearances and goals

Lothar Kurbjuweit (born 6 November 1950 in Riesa) is a former German footballer and football manager.

== Club career ==
Kurbjuweit played for Stahl Riesa (1965–1970) and Carl Zeiss Jena (1970–1983).

== International career ==
On the national level Kurbjuweit played for the East Germany national team (66 matches/four goals), and was a participant at the 1974 FIFA World Cup.

== Coaching career ==
Kurbjuweit later began coaching and led several teams, including Carl Zeiss Jena, Rot-Weiß Erfurt and VfB Pößneck. Kurbjuweit was from 1996 between 1999 the club chairman of Carl Zeiss Jena. On 22 April 2010, he signed a contract as Director of Sport with his former club Carl Zeiss Jena.

== Personal life ==
Kurbjuweit is married with the former long jumper Birgit Grimm and has a son with her, Tobias, who is a professional footballer. In the year 1992 he was named new business executive of Honda Präsent in Jena-Göschwitz and worked for the Carcenter between 2006.
