= Kees Krijgh (footballer, born 1950) =

Dutch footballer

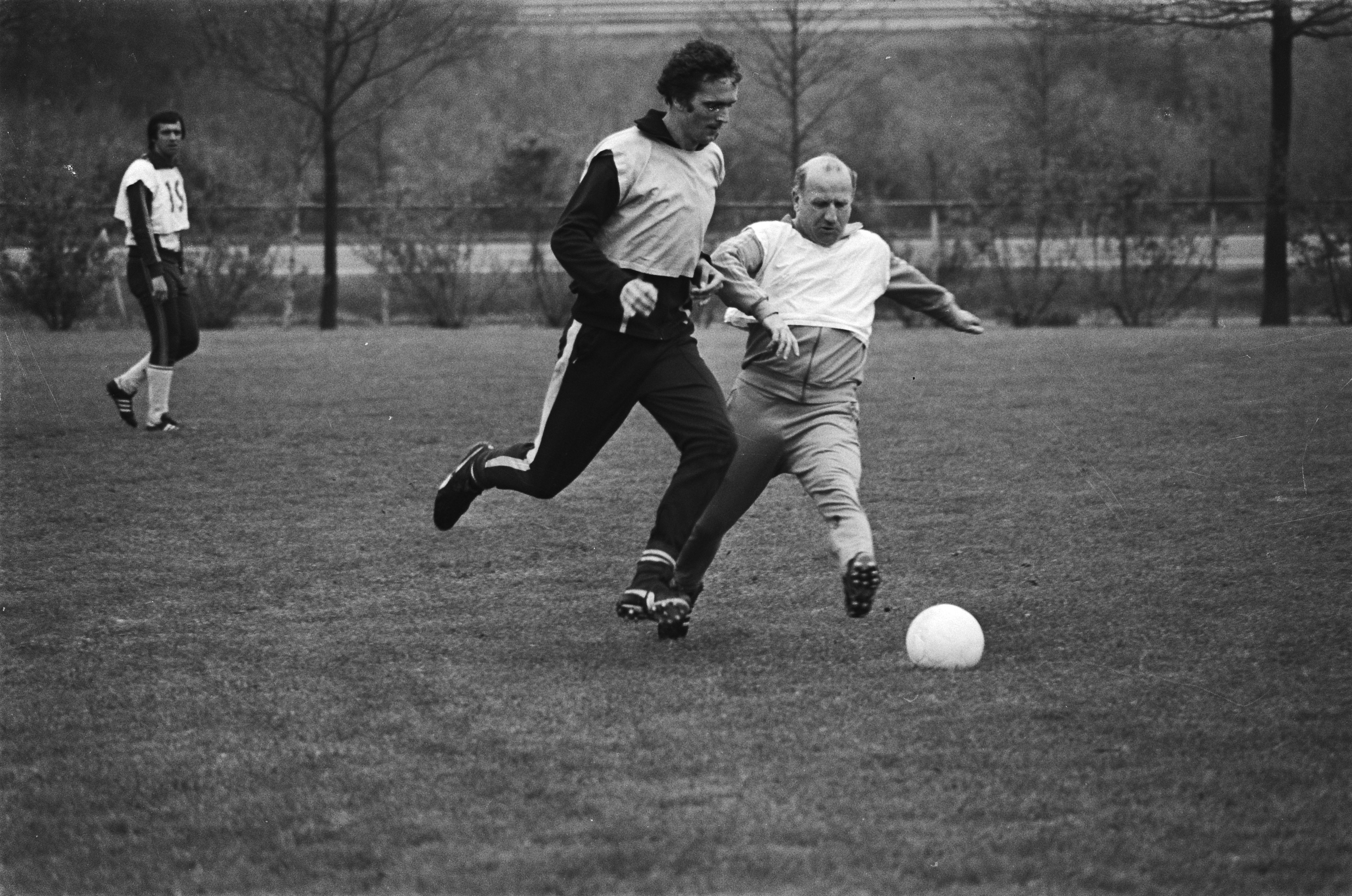
- Krijgh in 1978

Personal information
- Full name: Cornelus Krijgh
- Date of birth: 13 February 1950 (age 76)
- Place of birth: 's-Hertogenbosch, Netherlands
- Position: Defender

Youth career
- BVV

Senior career*
Years	Team	Apps	(Gls)
1969–1970	NEC	23	(0)
1970–1971	De Graafschap		
1971–1972	FC Den Bosch	32	(0)
1972–1979	PSV	209	(7)
1979–1981	Cercle Brugge	61	(4)
1981–1984	Willem II	63	(2)

International career
1975	Netherlands	2	(0)
- * Club domestic league appearances and goals

Cornelus "Kees" Krijgh (born 13 February 1950) is a Dutch retired professional football player. He was usually fielded as defender.

Krijgh started playing football with his local team BVV. His professional career took off with NEC, where he would stay one season. In the next two years, Krijgh played for De Graafschap and FC Den Bosch. In 1972, Krijgh signed with PSV Eindhoven, where he would spend most of his career. Highlight during this period was the final of the UEFA Cup in 1978, in which PSV defeated French side SC Bastia. In 1979, Krijgh went to Cercle Brugge, a Belgian team that just had won promotion to first division. After two seasons in Belgium, Krijgh chose Willem II Tilburg as his last team.

Krijgh appeared twice in his national colours. He made his debut on 15 October 1975 in a 3–0 home win against Poland. His was capped a second time against Italy.

His uncle, also nicknamed Kees Krijgh (real name: Cornelis Krijgh)', was also a Dutch footballer.
