= Ayfer Elmastaşoğlu =

Turkish footballer and manager

Personal information
- Full name: Ayfer Elmastaşoğlu
- Date of birth: 16 February 1944
- Place of birth: İzmir, Turkey
- Date of death: 13 January 2026 (aged 81)
- Place of death: İzmir, Turkey
- Height: 1.74 m (5 ft 9 in)
- Position: Midfielder

Senior career*
Years	Team	Apps	(Gls)
1961-1976	Altay	324	(60)

International career
1962–1963	Turkey U18	5	(1)
1966–1973	Turkey U21	3	(0)
1967–1971	Turkey	3	(0)

Managerial career
- 1980: Altay
- 1985: Altay
- 1990–1991: Marmaris Belediye
- 1991–1992: Manisaspor
- 1903: Bucaspor
- 1993–1994: Marmaris Belediye
- 1996: Simav Eynalspor
- 1999–2000: Marmaris Belediye
- 2001–2002: Marmaris Belediye
- 2005: Göztepe
- * Club domestic league appearances and goals

Ayfer Elmastaşoğlu (16 February 1944 – 13 January 2026) was a Turkish professional footballer and football manager. Elmastaşoğlu spent his entire playing career with Altay and captained them to their first Turkish Cup win in 1967. He also managed them for their second and final Turkish Cup victory in 1980.

== International career ==
Elmastaşoğlu was a youth international for Turkey, and represented the senior Turkey team 3 times. He debuted for Turkey in a 0-0 friendly tie with Denmark on 30 May 1966.

== Personal life ==
Elmastaşoğlu's brothers, Ayhan and Nail, were also professional footballers.

== Honours ==
=== Player ===
Altay

- Turkish Cup: 1966-67

=== Manager ===
Altay

- Turkish Cup: 1979-80
