= John Delamere (footballer) =

Irish footballer (born 1956)

Personal information
- Date of birth: 18 February 1956 (age 70)
- Position: Forward

Senior career*
Years	Team	Apps	(Gls)
1976–1978	Shelbourne		
1978	Sligo Rovers		
1978–1980	Shelbourne		
1980	Limerick		
1980–1981	Cork United		
1981–1983	PEC Zwolle	16	(3)
1983–84	Shelbourne		
1984	SV SVV		
1984–1985	Hammond Lane		
1985–1986	Home Farm		
1986–1987	Longford Town		
1987	Athlone Town		
- * Club domestic league appearances and goals

John Delamere (born 18 February 1956) is an Irish former professional footballer who played as a forward.

== Playing career ==
Delamere played in Ireland with Shelbourne, Limerick and Sligo Rovers. At Shelbourne, he was their top scorer for a few seasons. He signed for Sligo Rovers in January 1978 to replace Mick Leonard. Delamere was the top scorer in the 1978–79 League of Ireland season, scoring two goals for Sligo and 15 goals for Shelbourne.

He also played for Cork United, Hammond Lane, Home Farm, Longford Town and Athlone Town.

He spent the 1981–82 season with Dutch club PEC Zwolle. Author Gerjos Weelink described Delamere as a "purebred cult figure".

== Later life ==
As of September 2009, he was the President of amateur club Galty Celtic, and also sponsored the club's kits.

== Personal life ==
Delamere's step-brother Paddy Turner was also a footballer.
