= Kees Krijgh Sr. =

Dutch footballer (1921–2007)

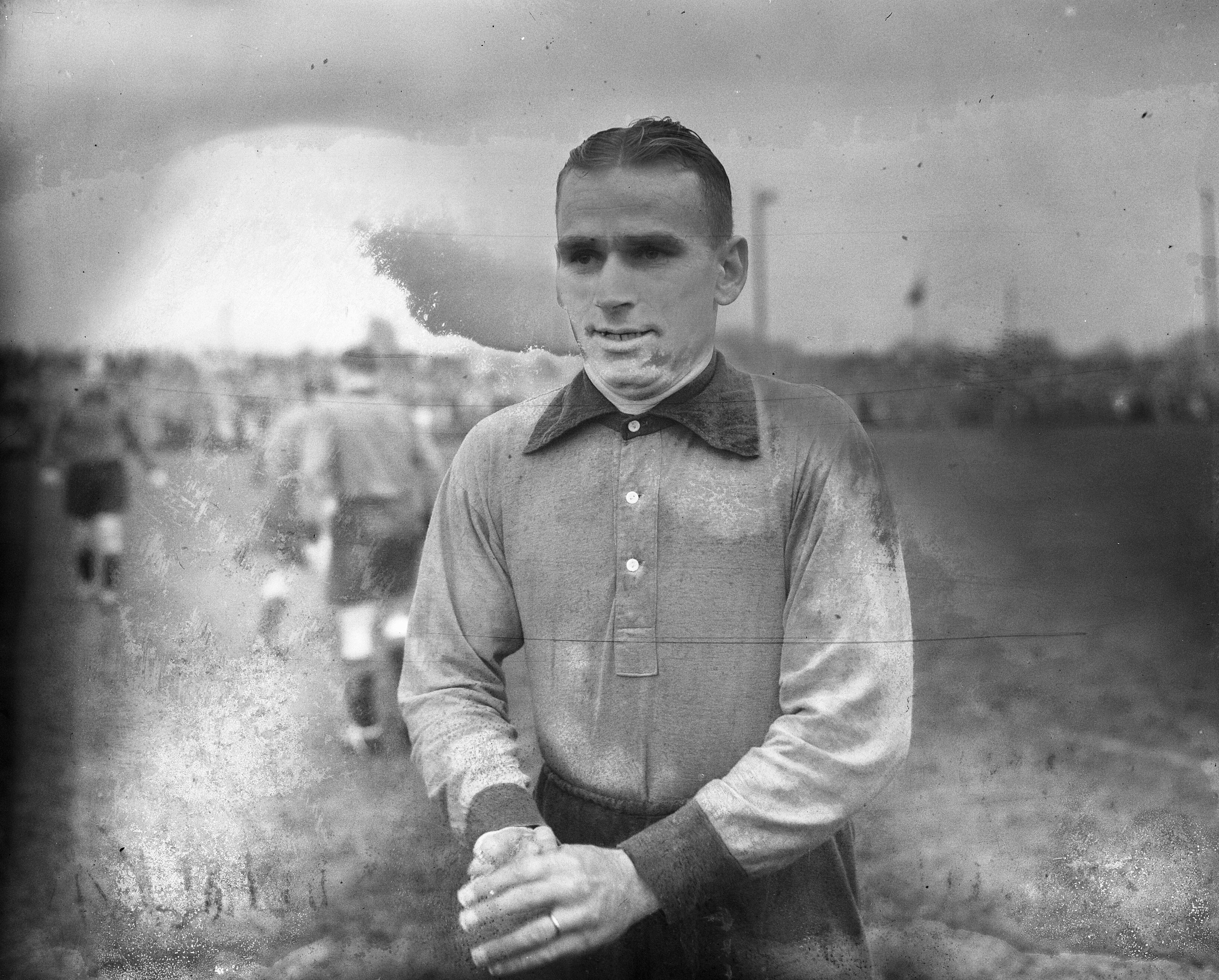
- Krijgh in 1950

Personal information
- Full name: Cornelis Krijgh
- Date of birth: 20 August 1921
- Place of birth: 's-Hertogenbosch, Netherlands
- Date of death: 15 June 2007 (aged 85)
- Place of death: 's-Hertogenbosch, Netherlands
- Position: Midfielder

Senior career*
Years	Team	Apps	(Gls)
1940–1957	BVV Den Bosch		

International career
1948–1950	Netherlands	3	(0)
- * Club domestic league appearances and goals

Cornelis "Kees" Krijgh Sr. (20 August 1921 – 15 June 2007) was a Dutch footballer who played as a midfielder, spending his entire career for BVV Den Bosch. He competed in the men's tournament at the 1948 Summer Olympics.

== Career ==
Born in 's-Hertogenbosch, Krijgh Sr. played for BVV Den Bosch his entire career as a defensive midfielder. In 1948, he won the league title with the club. He was capped three times for the Netherlands; his international debut was during the 1948 Summer Olympics. This match, in the preliminary round against Ireland, ended in a 3–1 win. Despite this, the Dutch team was eliminated in the first round.

During his career he was also called "de kleine Kees Krijgh" ("the small Kees Krijgh"). He was an uncle of Kees Krijgh Jr., who played for PSV and Cercle Brugge in the 1970s.

== Death ==
On 15 June 2007, Krijgh Sr. died at the age of 85 in the Oosterhof nursing home. His wife, Suze already preceded him. "After a life characterised by simplicity, cordiality, concern and love," could be read in the obituary.

== Honours ==
BVV

- Netherlands Football League Championship: 1947–48
