= Sonny Bosz =

Dutch footballer (born 1990)

Personal information
- Date of birth: 17 July 1990 (age 36)
- Place of birth: Toulon, France
- Positions: Defender; midfielder

Senior career*
Years	Team	Apps	(Gls)
-2010	Go Ahead Eagles	1	(0)
2010-2013	WHC		
2013-2014	Lienden	23	(1)
2014-2016	AGOVV		

Managerial career
- 2014-2020: Vitesse (scout)
- 2020-2024: Ajax (scout)
- 2024-: RKC (scout)
- * Club domestic league appearances and goals

Sonny Bosz (born 17 July 1990 in France) is a Dutch retired footballer, who could play alternatively as defender or midfielder.

== Career ==
Bosz started his career with Go Ahead Eagles. In 2014, he signed for AGOVV Apeldoorn.

He was named main scout at RKC in 2024 after working as a scout for Ajax and Vitesse.

== Personal life ==
Bosz is a son of manager and former international player Peter Bosz.
