= Georges Zvunka =

French footballer and manager (1937–2022)

Personal information
- Date of birth: 5 March 1937
- Place of birth: Le Ban-Saint-Martin, France
- Date of death: 12 April 2022 (aged 85)
- Position: Defender

Senior career*
Years	Team	Apps	(Gls)
1959–1972	Metz	433	(16)

Managerial career
- 1971–1972: Metz
- * Club domestic league appearances and goals

Georges Zvunka (Romanian: George Zvuncă; 5 March 1937 – 12 April 2022) was a French football player and manager.

He was the brother of Jules Zvunka and Victor Zvunka.
