= Maxim Dekker =

Dutch footballer (born 2004)

Personal information
- Date of birth: 21 April 2004 (age 22)
- Place of birth: Rijsenhout, Netherlands
- Height: 1.90 m (6 ft 3 in)
- Position: Centre-back

Team information
- Current team: Willem II
- Number: 23

Youth career
- 2014–2017: AFC
- 2017–2022: AZ

Senior career*
| Years | Team | Apps | (Gls) |
| 2021–2026 | Jong AZ | 80 | (2) |
| 2022–2026 | AZ | 35 | (1) |
| 2026– | Willem II | 5 | (0) |

International career^{‡}
| 2019 | Netherlands U15 | 4 | (0) |
| 2019–2020 | Netherlands U16 | 3 | (0) |
| 2021–2022 | Netherlands U18 | 6 | (0) |
| 2022 | Netherlands U19 | 2 | (0) |
| 2024 | Netherlands U21 | 2 | (1) |
- * Club domestic league appearances and goals as of 11 October 2026 ‡ National team caps and goals as of 14 November 2024

Maxim Dekker (born 21 April 2004) is a Dutch professional footballer who plays as a centre-back for Eredivisie club Willem II.

== Club career ==
A youth academy graduate of AZ, Dekker signed his first professional contract with the club in August 2020. He made his professional debut for Jong AZ on 30 April 2021 in a 1–0 league win against Roda JC.

On 2 September 2026, Dekker signed a three-season contract with Willem II.

== International career ==
Dekker is a current Dutch youth international. In September 2020, he was named in preliminary squad for the 2021 UEFA European Under-17 Championship. However, the tournament was cancelled due to COVID-19 pandemic in Europe.

== Career statistics ==
As of match played 15 April 2026

Appearances and goals by club, season and competition
| Club | Season | League | | | National cup | | Continental | | Other | | Total | |
| Club | Season | Division | Apps | Goals | Apps | Goals | Apps | Goals | Apps | Goals | Apps | Goals |
|---|---|---|---|---|---|---|---|---|---|---|---|---|
| Jong AZ | 2020–21 | Eerste Divisie | 1 | 0 | — | | — | | — | | 1 | 0 |
| Jong AZ | 2021–22 | Eerste Divisie | 24 | 0 | — | | — | | — | | 24 | 0 |
| Jong AZ | 2022–23 | Eerste Divisie | 10 | 2 | — | | — | | — | | 10 | 2 |
| Jong AZ | 2023–24 | Eerste Divisie | 26 | 0 | — | | — | | — | | 26 | 0 |
| Jong AZ | Total | | 61 | 2 | 0 | 0 | 0 | 0 | 0 | 0 | 61 | 2 |
| AZ | 2021–22 | Eredivisie | 0 | 0 | 0 | 0 | 0 | 0 | 1 (Note: Appearance in European play-offs) | 0 | 1 | 0 |
| AZ | 2022–23 | Eredivisie | 13 | 1 | 0 | 0 | 6 (Note: Appearances in UEFA Europa Conference League) | 0 | — | | 19 | 1 |
| AZ | 2023–24 | Eredivisie | 5 | 0 | 2 | 0 | 0 | 0 | — | | 7 | 0 |
| AZ | 2024–25 | Eredivisie | 14 | 0 | 2 | 0 | 3 (Note: Appearances in UEFA Europa League) | 0 | — | | 19 | 0 |
| AZ | 2025–26 | Eredivisie | 6 | 0 | 1 | 0 | 4 | 0 | — | | 11 | 0 |
| AZ | Total | | 38 | 1 | 5 | 0 | 13 | 0 | 1 | 0 | 56 | 1 |
| Career total | | | 99 | 3 | 5 | 0 | 13 | 0 | 1 | 0 | 118 | 3 |
