= 2024–25 AZ Alkmaar season =

AZ Alkmaar
2024–25 season
- President: René Neelissen
- General manager: Robert Eenhoorn
- Manager: Maarten Martens
- Stadium: AFAS Stadion
- Eredivisie: 5th
- KNVB Cup: Runners-up
- UEFA Europa League: Round of 16
- Top goalscorer: League: Troy Parrott (14); All: Troy Parrott (20)
- Highest home attendance: 19,002
- Lowest home attendance: 12,007
- Average home league attendance: 17,919
- Biggest win: AZ 9–1 Heerenveen
Home colours	Away colours	Third colours

The 2024–25 season was the 58th season in the history of AZ Alkmaar, and was also the 27th consecutive season in the Eredivisie. In addition to the domestic league, the club participated in the KNVB Cup and reached the round of 16 in the UEFA Europa League.

== Transfers ==
=== In ===
Pos.	Player	Transferred from	Fee	Date	Source
DF	(Japan) Seiya Maikuma	(Japan) Cerezo Osaka	€800,000	1 July 2024	
FW	(Republic of Ireland) Troy Parrott	(England) Tottenham Hotspur	€4,000,000	13 July 2024	
GK	(Netherlands) Jeroen Zoet	(Italy) Spezia	Free transfer	15 July 2024	

=== Out ===
Pos.	Player	Transferred to	Fee	Date	Source
FW	(Greece) Vangelis Pavlidis	(Portugal) Benfica	€18,000,000	1 July 2024	
MF	(Denmark) Jens Odgaard	(Italy) Bologna	€4,000,000	1 July 2024	
GK	(Denmark) Peter Vindahl Jensen	(Czech Republic) Sparta Prague	€1,500,000	1 July 2024	
MF	(Netherlands) Dani de Wit	(Germany) VfL Bochum	Free transfer	3 July 2024	
MF	(Netherlands) Kenzo Goudmijn	(England) Derby County	€820,000	10 July 2024	
DF	(Japan) Yukinari Sugawara	(England) Southampton	€7,000,000	14 July 2024	
GK	(Australia) Mathew Ryan	(Italy) AS Roma	Free transfer	17 July 2024	

== Friendlies ==
=== Pre-season ===
13 July 2024 Friendly	AZ	8–0	Excelsior	Alkmaar
14:00	Sadiq 1'; van Brederode 7' (pen.); Koopmeiners 27'; Poku 37', 57'; Zeefuik 67', 81'; Bazoer 85'	Report		Stadium: Alkmaarsche Boys

20 July 2024 Friendly	AZ (Netherlands)	3–0	(Belgium) Kortrijk	Alkmaar, Netherlands
14:00	Parrott 14'; Sadiq 59'; Maikuma 78'	Report		Stadium: Sportpark Overdie

24 July 2024 Friendly	AZ (Netherlands)	2–1	(Greece) Aris	Dirkshorn, Netherlands
14:00	Burmeester 21'; Penetra 68'	Report		Stadium: Football pitch Dirkshorn

27 July 2024 AZ Fan Day	AZ (Netherlands)	2–2	(Italy) Atalanta	Alkmaar, Netherlands
14:00 CEST (UTC+2)	Parrott 35'; Zeefuik 88'	Report	Wolfe 65' (o.g.); De Ketelaere 70'	Stadium: AFAS Stadion; Referee: Joey Kooij

31 July 2024 Friendly	AZ (Netherlands)	1–1	(France) Le Havre	Alkmaar, Netherlands
19:00 CEST (UTC+2)	Poku 2'	Report	Soumaré 10'	Stadium: AFAS Stadion; Referee: Jannick van der Laan

3 August 2024 Friendly	Stoke City (England)	0–1	(Netherlands) AZ	Stoke-on-Trent, England
15:00 BST		Report	Parrott 47'	Stadium: Bet365 Stadium; Referee: Andrew Kitchen

== Competitions ==
=== Overall record ===
Competition	First match	Last match	Starting round	Final position	Record							
Competition	First match	Last match	Starting round	Final position	Pld	W	D	L	GF	GA	GD	Win %
Eredivisie	11 August 2024	18 May 2025	Matchday 1	5th	34	16	9	9	58	37	+21	47.06
KNVB Cup	9 December 2025	21 April 2025	Second round	Runners-up	5	3	2	0	11	5	+6	60.00
UEFA Europa League	25 September 2024	13 March 2025	League phase	Round of 16	12	5	3	4	21	19	+2	41.67
Total					51	24	14	13	90	61	+29	47.06

Last updated: 18 May 2025
Source: Competitions

=== Eredivisie ===
The full schedule was released in June 2024.

==== League table ====
Pos	Team	Pld	W	D	L	GF	GA	GD	Pts	Qualification or relegation
3	Feyenoord	34	20	8	6	76	38	+38	68	Qualification for the Champions League third qualifying round
4	Utrecht	34	18	10	6	62	45	+17	64	Qualification for the Europa League second qualifying round
5	AZ (O)	34	16	9	9	58	37	+21	57	Qualification for the European competition play-offs
6	Twente	34	15	9	10	62	49	+13	54	Qualification for the European competition play-offs
7	Go Ahead Eagles	34	14	9	11	57	55	+2	51	Qualification for the Europa League league phase (Note: Qualified for the Europa League league phase as the 2024–25 KNVB Cup winners.)

Source: Eredivisie
Rules for classification: 1) Points; 2) Goal difference; 3) Goals scored; 4) Head-to-head points; 5) Head-to-head goal difference; 6) Head-to-head away goals scored; 7) Play-off if relevant for deciding champion, relegation or participating in a European league, otherwise by draw. 8) Penalty shoot-out (only after a play-off)
(O) Play-off winners

==== Matches ====
10 August 2024 1	Almere City FC	0–1	AZ Alkmaar	Almere

17 August 2024 2	AZ Alkmaar	1–0	NEC Nijmegen	Alkmaar

25 August 2024 3	FC Groningen	0–0	AZ Alkmaar	Groningen

30 August 2024 4	RKC Waalwijk	0–3	AZ Alkmaar	Waalwijk

14 September 2024 5	AZ Alkmaar	9–1	SC Heerenveen	Alkmaar

20 September 2024 6	PEC Zwolle	1–2	AZ Alkmaar	Zwolle

29 September 2024 7	AZ Alkmaar	1–2	FC Utrecht	Alkmaar

6 October 2024 8	Fortuna Sittard	1–0	AZ Alkmaar	Sittard-Geleen

19 October 2024 9	AZ Alkmaar	1–2	PSV Eindhoven	Alkmaar

27 October 2024 10	AZ Alkmaar	2–2	Go Ahead Eagles	Alkmaar

2 November 2024 11	Feyenoord	3–2	AZ Alkmaar	Rotterdam

10 November 2024 12	AZ Alkmaar	1–2	Willem II	Alkmaar

24 November 2024 13	Sparta Rotterdam	1–2	AZ Alkmaar	Rotterdam

1 December 2024 14	AZ Alkmaar	1–0	Heracles Almelo	Alkmaar

8 December 2024 15	AZ Alkmaar	2–1	AFC Ajax	Alkmaar

15 December 2024 16	NAC Breda	1–2	AZ Alkmaar	Breda

21 December 2024 17	AZ Alkmaar	1–0	FC Twente	Alkmaar

11 January 2025 18	PSV Eindhoven	2–2	AZ Alkmaar	Eindhoven

18 January 2025 19	FC Utrecht	0–0	AZ Alkmaar	Utrecht

26 January 2025 20	AZ Alkmaar	1–2	Sparta Rotterdam	Alkmaar

2 February 2025 21	Willem II	0–2	AZ Alkmaar	Tilburg

9 February 2025 22	AZ Alkmaar	2–0	PEC Zwolle	Alkmaar

23 February 2025 23	AZ Alkmaar	1–0	Fortuna Sittard	Alkmaar

2 March 2025 24	SC Heerenveen	3–1	AZ Alkmaar	Heerenveen

16 March 2025 25	AFC Ajax	2-2	AZ Alkmaar	Amsterdam

29 March 2025 26	NEC	3-3	AZ Alkmaar	Nijmegen

1 April 2025 27	AZ Alkmaar	2-2	RKC Waalwijk	Alkmaar

5 April 2025 28	AZ Alkmaar	0-1	Feyenoord	Alkmaar

5 April 2025 29	Heracles	1-0	AZ Alkmaar	Almelo

24 April 2025 30	AZ Alkmaar	1-1	NAC	Alkmaar

4 May 2025 31	Go Ahead Eagles	0-3	AZ Alkmaar	Deventer

11 May 2025 32	AZ Alkmaar	3-0	FC Groningen	Alkmaar

14 May 2025 33	FC Twente	2-3	AZ Alkmaar	Enschede

18 May 2025 34	AZ Alkmaar	1-1	Almere City	Alkmaar

=== KNVB Cup ===
==== Matches ====
18 December 2024 Second round	AZ	3–1	FC Groningen	Alkmaar
21:00	Mijnans 4'; Van Bommel 70'; Addai 84'	Report	Bacuna 41' (pen.)	Stadium: AFAS Stadion; Attendance: 8,881; Referee: Serdar Gözübüyük

14 January 2025 Round of 16	AZ	2–0	Ajax	Alkmaar
18:45	Goes 36'; Meerdink 89'	Report		Stadium: AFAS Stadion; Attendance: 15,032; Referee: Serdar Gözübüyük

6 February 2025 Quarter-final	AZ	3–1	Quick Boys	Alkmaar
20:00	Addai 33'; Parrott 58' (pen.); Smit 90+6'	Report	Brouwer 39'	Stadium: AFAS Stadion; Attendance: 14,334; Referee: Bas Nijhuis

27 February 2025 Semi-final	Heracles Almelo	2–2 (a.e.t.) (3–4 p)	AZ	Almelo
20:00	Mirani 17'; Podgoreanu 80'	Report	Poku 12'; Lahdo 28'	Stadium: Asito Stadium; Attendance: 12,161; Referee: Serdar Gözübüyük
	Penalties
	Hornkamp (penalty scored); Van Kaam (penalty scored); Hoogma (penalty missed); Engels (penalty scored); Mesík (penalty missed); Limbombe (penalty missed)		(penalty scored) Clasie; (penalty missed) Parrott; (penalty scored) Koopmeiners; (penalty missed) Kasius; (penalty scored) Penetra; (penalty scored) Lahdo

21 April 2025 Final	AZ	1–1 (a.e.t.) (2–4 p)	Go Ahead Eagles	De Kuip, Rotterdam
18:00 UTC+02:00	Parrott 54' (pen.); Poku (yellow card) 62'; Goes (yellow card) 89'	Report	Kramer (yellow card) 84'; Deijl 90+9' (pen.); Victor Edvardsen (yellow card) 90+9'	Attendance: 42,972; Referee: Danny Makkelie
	Penalties
	Meerdink (penalty scored); Koopmeiners (penalty scored); Buurmeester (penalty missed); Lahdo (penalty missed)		(penalty scored) Deijl; (penalty scored) Søren Tengstedt; (penalty scored) MSmit; (penalty scored) Dirksen

=== UEFA Europa League ===
==== League phase ====
25 September 2024 1	AZ (Netherlands)	3–2	(Sweden) IF Elfsborg	AFAS Stadion, Alkmaar
18:45	Van Bommel 44', 50'; Parrott 74' (pen.)	Report	Ouma 23'; Hedlund 53'	Attendance: 16,371; Referee: Juxhin Xhaja (Albania)

3 October 2024 2	Athletic Bilbao (Spain)	2–0	(Netherlands) AZ	San Mamés, Bilbao
21:00	I. Williams 72'; Sancet 85'	Report		Attendance: 40,328; Referee: Balázs Berke (Hungary)

24 October 2024 3	Tottenham Hotspur (England)	1–0	(Netherlands) AZ	Tottenham Hotspur Stadium, London
21:00 (20:00 UTC+1)	Richarlison 53' (pen.)	Report		Attendance: 53,438; Referee: Manfredas Lukjančukas (Lithuania)

7 November 2024 4	AZ (Netherlands)	3–1	(Turkey) Fenerbahçe	AFAS Stadion, Alkmaar
21:00	Daal 59'; Smit 75'; Kasius 87'	Report	En-Nesyri 70'	Attendance: 15,383; Referee: John Beaton (Scotland)

28 November 2024 5	AZ (Netherlands)	1–1	(Turkey) Galatasaray	AFAS Stadion, Alkmaar
18:45	Mijnans 2'	Report	Osimhen 43'	Attendance: 16,229; Referee: Horațiu Feșnic (Romania)

12 December 2024 6	Ludogorets Razgrad (Bulgaria)	2–2	(Netherlands) AZ	Huvepharma Arena, Razgrad
18:45 (19:45 UTC+2)	Chochev 60'; Duah 63'	Report	Van Bommel 13'; Maikuma 19'	Attendance: 4,245; Referee: Kristo Tohver (Estonia)

23 January 2025 7	AZ (Netherlands)	1–0	(Italy) Roma	AFAS Stadion, Alkmaar
18:45	Parrott 80'	Report		Attendance: 18,635; Referee: Irfan Peljto (Bosnia and Herzegovina)

30 January 2025 8	Ferencváros (Hungary)	4–3	(Netherlands) AZ	Ferencváros Stadion, Budapest
21:00	Ben Romdhane 9', 45'; Traoré 34'; B. Varga 82' (pen.)	Report	Mijnans 76', 90+5'; Parrott 90'	Attendance: 18,657; Referee: Nenad Minaković (Serbia)

==== Knockout phase ====
13 February 2025 First leg	AZ (Netherlands)	4–1	(Turkey) Galatasaray	Alkmaar, Netherlands
	Mijnans 12'; Parrott 37' (pen.); Wolfe (yellow card) 48', (goal) 66'; Clasie 57', (yellow card) 75'	Report	Ayhan (yellow card) 11' (yellow-red card) 51'; Sallai 20'; Bardakcı (yellow card) 43'; Morata (yellow card) 57'	Stadium: AFAS Stadion; Referee: João Pinheiro (Portugal)

20 February 2025 Second Leg	Galatasaray (Turkey)	2–2 (6–3 agg.)	(Netherlands) AZ	Istanbul
	Osimhen 56'; Jelert (yellow card) 65'; Sallai 70'	Report	Maikuma 42'; Kasius 55'	Stadium: Rams Park; Referee: Anthony Taylor (England)

==== Round of 16 ====
6 March 2025 Play-offs	AZ (Netherlands)	1–0	(England) Tottenham Hotspur	Alkmaar, Netherlands
18:45 CET	Bergvall 18' (o.g.); Koopmeiners (yellow card) 66'; Poku (yellow card) 68'; Van Duijn (yellow card) 90+4'	Report	Bentancur (yellow card) 62'	Stadium: AFAS Stadion; Attendance: 18,281; Referee: Rade Obrenovič (Slovenia)

13 March 2025 Play-offs	Tottenham Hotspur (England)	3–1 (3–2 agg.)	(Netherlands) AZ	London, England
20:00 GMT	Odobert 26', 74'; Maddison 48'	Report	Koopmeiners 63'	Stadium: Tottenham Hotspur Stadium; Referee: João Pinheiro (Portugal)
