= 2023–24 AZ Alkmaar season =

AZ Alkmaar
2023–24 season
- Chairman: René Neelissen
- Head coach: Pascal Jansen (until 17 January); Maarten Martens (from 17 January)
- Stadium: AFAS Stadion
- Eredivisie: 4th
- KNVB Cup: Quarter-finals
- UEFA Europa Conference League: Group stage
- Top goalscorer: League: Vangelis Pavlidis (29); All: Vangelis Pavlidis (33)
- Average home league attendance: 18,187
| Home colours | Away colours | Third colours |

The 2023–24 season was AZ Alkmaar's 57th season in existence and second consecutive season in the Eredivisie. They also competed in the KNVB Cup and the UEFA Europa Conference League.

== Players ==
=== First-team squad ===
As of 1 February 2024

Note: Flags indicate national team as defined under FIFA eligibility rules; some limited exceptions apply. Players may hold more than one non-FIFA nationality.

| No. | Pos. | Nation | Player |
|---|---|---|---|
| 1 | GK | AUS | Mathew Ryan |
| 2 | DF | JPN | Yukinari Sugawara |
| 3 | DF | NED | Wouter Goes |
| 4 | DF | NED | Bruno Martins Indi (captain) |
| 5 | DF | POR | Alexandre Penetra |
| 6 | MF | POR | Tiago Dantas (on loan from Benfica) |
| 8 | MF | NED | Jordy Clasie (vice-captain) |
| 9 | FW | GRE | Vangelis Pavlidis |
| 10 | MF | NED | Dani de Wit |
| 11 | FW | GHA | Ibrahim Sadiq |
| 12 | GK | NED | Hobie Verhulst |
| 13 | GK | NED | Sem Westerveld |
| 14 | MF | SRB | Kristijan Belić |
| 15 | FW | NED | Ruben van Bommel |

| No. | Pos. | Nation | Player |
|---|---|---|---|
| 16 | MF | NED | Sven Mijnans |
| 18 | DF | NOR | David Møller Wolfe |
| 19 | FW | NED | Myron van Brederode |
| 20 | GK | NED | Rome-Jayden Owusu-Oduro |
| 21 | FW | NED | Ernest Poku |
| 22 | DF | NED | Maxim Dekker |
| 23 | FW | SWE | Mayckel Lahdo |
| 24 | MF | NED | Lewis Schouten |
| 25 | DF | NED | Riechedly Bazoer |
| 27 | DF | POR | Gonçalo Esteves (on loan from Sporting) |
| 28 | FW | NED | Lequincio Zeefuik |
| 30 | DF | NED | Denso Kasius |
| 34 | DF | NED | Mees de Wit |

=== Out on loan ===
Note: Flags indicate national team as defined under FIFA eligibility rules; some limited exceptions apply. Players may hold more than one non-FIFA nationality.

| No. | Pos. | Nation | Player |
|---|---|---|---|
| — | MF | NED | Zico Buurmeester (at PEC Zwolle until 30 June 2024) |
| — | MF | NED | Kenzo Goudmijn (at Excelsior until 30 June 2025) |

| No. | Pos. | Nation | Player |
|---|---|---|---|
| — | MF | NED | Peer Koopmeiners (at Almere City until 30 June 2024) |
| — | FW | NED | Mexx Meerdink (at Vitesse until 30 June 2025) |
| — | FW | DEN | Jens Odgaard (at Bologna until 30 June 2024) |

== Transfers ==
=== In ===
| Pos. | Player | Transferred from | Fee | Date | Source |
|---|---|---|---|---|---|
| DF | (Portugal) Alexandre Penetra | (Portugal) Famalicão | €4,200,000 | 24 July 2023 | |
| FW | (Ghana) Ibrahim Sadiq | (Sweden) BK Häcken | €4,000,000 | 1 September 2023 | |
| MF | (Serbia) Kristijan Belić | (Serbia) FK Partizan | €4,000,000 | 13 January 2024 | |

=== Out ===
| Pos. | Player | Transferred to | Fee | Date | Source |
|---|---|---|---|---|---|
| FW | (Turkey) Yusuf Barası | (Turkey) Adana Demirspor | Undisclosed | 26 August 2023 | |
| DF | (Greece) Pantelis Chatzidiakos | (Italy) Cagliari | €2,000,000 | 1 September 2023 | |

== Pre-season and friendlies ==
Win Draw Loss Fixtures

| 19 July 2023 Friendly | AZ (Netherlands) | 1–1 | (England) Norwich City | Dirkshorn, Netherlands |
| 18:30 UTC+2 | Van Bommel 10' | Report | Barnes 6' | Stadium: Sportpark vv Dirkshorn; Attendance: 1,800; Referee: Sander van der Eijk (Netherlands) |

| 22 July 2023 Friendly | Club Brugge (Belgium) | 1–2 | (Netherlands) AZ | Bruges |
| 15:00 UTC+2 | Olsen 3'; Thiago (yellow card) 42'; Odoi (yellow card) 76'; Yaremchuk (yellow card) 81'; Vetlesen (yellow card) 90+2'; Vanaken (yellow card) 90+4' | | De Wit 9'; Bazoer (yellow card) 42'; Sugawara (yellow card) 55', (goal) 64' | Stadium: Jan Breydel Stadium |

| 29 July 2023 Friendly | Southampton (England) | 0–1 | (Netherlands) AZ | Southampton, England |
| 15:00 UTC+1 | Stephens (yellow card) | Report | M. De Wit (yellow card); Lahdo 65' | Stadium: St Mary's Stadium; Attendance: 7,277; Referee: Keith Stroud (England) |

| 5 August 2023 Friendly | AZ (Netherlands) | 1–0 | (Italy) Bologna | Alkmaar |
| 17:00 UTC+2 | Poku 48' | Report | | Stadium: AFAS Stadion; Attendance: 8,021; Referee: Dennis Higler (Netherlands) |

== Competitions ==
=== Overall record ===
| Competition | First match | Last match | Starting round | Final position | Record | | | | | | | |
| Competition | First match | Last match | Starting round | Final position | Pld | W | D | L | GF | GA | GD | Win % |
|---|---|---|---|---|---|---|---|---|---|---|---|---|
| Eredivisie | 13 August 2023 | 19 May 2024 | Matchday 1 | 4th | 34 | 19 | 8 | 7 | 70 | 39 | +31 | 55.88 |
| KNVB Cup | 20 December 2023 | 7 February 2024 | Second round | Quarter-finals | 3 | 1 | 1 | 1 | 6 | 7 | −1 | 33.33 |
| UEFA Europa Conference League | 10 August 2023 | 14 December 2023 | Third qualifying round | Group stage | 10 | 4 | 2 | 4 | 14 | 15 | −1 | 40.00 |
| Total | | | | | 47 | 24 | 11 | 12 | 90 | 61 | +29 | 51.06 |

Source: Soccerway

=== Eredivisie ===
==== League table ====
| Pos | Team | Pld | W | D | L | GF | GA | GD | Pts | Qualification or relegation |
|---|---|---|---|---|---|---|---|---|---|---|
| 2 | Feyenoord | 34 | 26 | 6 | 2 | 92 | 26 | +66 | 84 | Qualification for the Champions League league stage |
| 3 | Twente | 34 | 21 | 6 | 7 | 69 | 36 | +33 | 69 | Qualification for the Champions League third qualifying round |
| 4 | AZ | 34 | 19 | 8 | 7 | 70 | 39 | +31 | 65 | Qualification for the Europa League league stage (Note: The 2023–24 KNVB Cup winners qualified for the Europa League league stage. Since the cup winners (Feyenoord) qualified based on league position, the Europa League spot was passed to the fourth-placed team.) |
| 5 | Ajax | 34 | 15 | 11 | 8 | 74 | 61 | +13 | 56 | Qualification for the Europa League second qualifying round |
| 6 | NEC | 34 | 14 | 11 | 9 | 68 | 51 | +17 | 53 | Qualification for the European competition play-offs |

Source: Eredivisie
Rules for classification: Season in progress: 1) Most points won; 2) Less points lost; 3) Goal difference; 4) Goals scored; 5) Alphabetical order; End of season: 1) Points; 2) Goal difference; 3) Goals scored; 4) Head-to-head points; 5) Head-to-head goal difference; 6) Head-to-head away goals scored; 7) Play-off if relevant for deciding champion, relegation or participating in a European league, otherwise by draw. 8) Penalty shoot-out (only after a play-off)

==== Results summary ====
| Overall | | | | | | | | Home | | | | | | Away | | | | | |
| Pld | W | D | L | GF | GA | GD | Pts | W | D | L | GF | GA | GD | W | D | L | GF | GA | GD |
|---|---|---|---|---|---|---|---|---|---|---|---|---|---|---|---|---|---|---|---|
| 34 | 19 | 8 | 7 | 70 | 39 | +31 | 65 | 11 | 3 | 3 | 41 | 18 | +23 | 8 | 5 | 4 | 29 | 21 | +8 |

==== Results by round ====
| Round | 1 | 2 | 3 | 4 | 5 | 6 | 7 | 8 | 9 | 10 | 11 | 12 | 13 | 14 | 15 | 16 | 17 | 18 | 19 | 20 | 21 | 22 | 23 | 24 | 25 | 26 | 27 | 28 | 29 |
|---|---|---|---|---|---|---|---|---|---|---|---|---|---|---|---|---|---|---|---|---|---|---|---|---|---|---|---|---|---|
| Ground | H | A | H | H | A | H | H | A | H | A | A | H | A | H | H | H | A | H | A | H | A | A | H | A | H | A | H | A | A |
| Result | W | W | W | W | W | D | W | W | W | D | L | W | D | L | W | L | L | D | D | L | D | W | W | D | W | W | W | L | |
| Position | 1 | 1 | 6 | 5 | 5 | 5 | 2 | 2 | 2 | 2 | 4 | 3 | 3 | 3 | 3 | 4 | 4 | 4 | 4 | 4 | 4 | 4 | 4 | 4 | 4 | 4 | 4 | 4 | 4 |
| Points | 3 | 6 | 9 | 12 | 15 | 16 | 19 | 22 | 25 | 26 | 26 | 29 | 30 | 30 | 33 | 33 | 33 | 34 | 35 | 35 | 36 | 39 | 42 | 43 | 46 | 49 | 52 | 52 | |

Updated to match(es) played on 3 April 2024. Source:
A = Away; H = Home; W = Win; D = Draw; L = Loss

==== Matches ====
The league fixtures were unveiled on 30 June 2023.

| 13 August 2023 1 | AZ | 5–1 | Go Ahead Eagles | Alkmaar |
| 14:30 UTC+2 | Clasie 4'; Pavlidis 15'; D. de Wit (yellow card) 16', (goal) 87' (pen.); Van Bommel 51'; Chatzidiakos (yellow card) 65'; Lahdo 90+3' | Report | Amofa (yellow card) 2'; Nauber (yellow card) 34'; Rommens 66'; Deijl (yellow card) 87' | Stadium: AFAS Stadion; Referee: Danny Makkelie |

| 20 August 2023 2 | RKC Waalwijk | 1–3 | AZ | Waalwijk |
| 16:45 UTC+2 | Kramer 41' (pen.), (yellow card) 58'; Margaret (yellow card) 76' | Report | Pavlidis 54', 79'; D. de Wit 59'; Poku (yellow card) 63' | Stadium: Mandemakers Stadion; Referee: Alex Bos |

| 3 September 2023 4 | Vitesse | 0–2 | AZ | Arnhem |
| 16:45 | | Report | Pavlidis 49', 64' | Stadium: GelreDome; Referee: Jeroen Manschot |

| 17 September 2023 5 | AZ | 2–0 | Sparta Rotterdam | Alkmaar |
| 16:45 UTC+2 | D. de Wit 18'; Pavlidis 19' | Report | | Stadium: AFAS Stadion; Referee: Pol van Boekel |

| 24 September 2023 6 | PEC Zwolle | 0–3 | AZ | Zwolle |
| 16:45 UTC+2 | | Report | Lahdo 13'; Van Brederode 52'; Pavlidis 90' | Stadium: MAC³PARK Stadion; Referee: Edwin van de Graaf |

| 28 September 2023 3 | AZ | 1–1 | Heracles | Alkmaar |
| 20:00 UTC+2 | Pavlidis 13' | Report | Ouahim 53' | Stadium: AFAS Stadion; Referee: Danny Makkelie |

| 1 October 2023 7 | AZ | 4–0 | Fortuna Sittard | Alkmaar |
| 16:45 UTC+2 | Clasie 45+1'; Pavlidis 49'; Siovas 82' (o.g.); Dantas 88' | Report | | Stadium: AFAS Stadion; Referee: Serdar Gözübüyük |

| 8 October 2023 8 | Ajax | 1–2 | AZ | Amsterdam |
| 12:30 UTC+2 | Van den Boomen 73' | Report | Pavlidis 45'; D. de Wit 57' | Stadium: Johan Cruyff Arena; Referee: Allard Lindhout |

| 21 October 2023 9 | AZ | 3–0 | Heerenveen | Alkmaar |
| 19:00 UTC+2 | Pavlidis 11', 59', 76' | Report | | Stadium: AFAS Stadion; Referee: Jochen Kamphuis |

| 6 November 2023 11 | Excelsior | 1–1 | AZ | Rotterdam |
| 16:45 UTC+1 | Sandra 90+1' | Report | Lahdo 72' | Stadium: Stadion Woudestein; Referee: Laurens Gerrets |

| 12 November 2023 12 | Feyenoord | 1–0 | AZ | Rotterdam |
| 16:45 UTC+1 | Timber 24' | Report | | Stadium: De Kuip; Referee: Danny Makkelie |

| 26 November 2023 13 | AZ | 3–0 | Volendam | Alkmaar |
| 14:30 UTC+1 | Van Bommel 5'; Pavlidis 48'; Martins Indi 57' | Report | | Stadium: AFAS Stadion; Referee: Bas Nijhuis |

| 3 December 2023 14 | Utrecht | 1–1 | AZ | Utrecht |
| 16:45 UTC+1 | Jensen 49' | Report | Pavlidis 40' | Stadium: Stadion Galgenwaard; Referee: Erwin Blank |

| 6 December 2023 10 | AZ | 1–2 | NEC | Alkmaar |
| 19:00 UTC+1 | Pavlidis 57' | Report | Dost 11'; Mattsson 31' | Stadium: AFAS Stadion; Referee: Jeroen Manschot |
Note: Match originally scheduled on 29 October 2023, but was abandoned in injury time after NEC player Bas Dost collapsed.

| 9 December 2023 15 | AZ | 4–1 | Almere City | Alkmaar |
| 21:00 UTC+1 | Pavlidis 7', 90+2'; D. de Wit 66'; Møller Wolfe 80' | Report | Mbe Soh 56' | Stadium: AFAS Stadion; Attendance: 18,429; Referee: Sander van der Eijk |

| 17 December 2023 16 | AZ | 0–4 | PSV | Alkmaar |
| 20:00 UTC+1 | | Report | de Jong 9' (pen.), 57'; Saibari 11'; Dest 16' | Stadium: AFAS Stadion; Referee: Dennis Higler |

| 13 January 2024 17 | Twente | 2–1 | AZ | Enschede |
| 18:45 UTC+1 | Ugalde 42', 70' | Report | Odgaard 4' | Stadium: De Grolsch Veste; Referee: Serdar Gözübüyük |

| 20 January 2024 18 | AZ | 2–2 | PEC Zwolle | Alkmaar |
| 20:00 UTC+1 | Pavlidis 77' (pen.); Mijnans 90+4' | Report | Thy 57'; Velanas 86' | Stadium: AFAS Stadion; Referee: Allard Lindhout |

| 28 January 2024 19 | Heerenveen | 2–2 | AZ | Heerenveen |
| 12:15 UTC+1 | Clasie 24' (o.g.); Brouwers 51' | Report | Pavlidis 19'; Bochniewicz 88' (o.g.) | Stadium: Abe Lenstra Stadion; Referee: Sander van der Wijk |

| 4 February 2024 20 | AZ | 0–1 | Feyenoord | Alkmaar |
| 12:30 UTC+1 | | Report | Wieffer 6' | Stadium: AFAS Stadion; Referee: Danny Makkelie |

| 10 February 2024 21 | Almere City | 0–0 | AZ | Almere |
| 20:00 UTC+1 | | Report | | Stadium: Yanmar Stadion; Referee: A. Bos |

| 17 February 2024 22 | Fortuna Sittard | 1–2 | AZ | Sittard |
| 16:45 UTC+1 | Córdoba 18' | Report | Pavlidis 63'; D. de Wit 90' | Stadium: Fortuna Sittard Stadion |

| 25 February 2024 23 | AZ | 2–0 | Ajax | Alkmaar |
| 16:45 UTC+1 | van Bommel 7', 67' | Report | | Stadium: AFAS Stadion; Referee: Allard Lindhout |

| 2 March 2024 24 | Sparta Rotterdam | 1–1 | AZ | Rotterdam |
| 16:45 UTC+1 | Verschueren 74' | Report | Sugawara 25' | Stadium: Sparta Stadion Het Kasteel; Referee: Jochem Kamphuis |

| 10 March 2024 25 | AZ | 4–0 | Excelsior | Alkmaar |
| 16:45 UTC+1 | D. de Wit 13'; Pavlidis 15'; Mijnans 25', 72' | Report | | Stadium: AFAS Stadion; Referee: Martin van den Kerkhof |

| 17 March 2024 26 | Volendam | 0–4 | AZ | Volendam |
| 12:15 UTC+1 | | Report | D. de Wit 22'; Sugawara 30', 76'; Pavlidis 70' | Stadium: Kras Stadion; Referee: Sander van der Eijk |

| 30 March 2024 27 | AZ | 2–0 | Vitesse | Alkmaar |
| 16:45 UTC+1 | D. de Wit 53'; Pavlidis 64' | Report | | Stadium: AFAS Stadion; Referee: Jannick van der Laan |

| 3 April 2024 28 | Heracles | 5–0 | AZ | Almelo |
| 18:45 UTC+2 | De Keersmaecker 19'; Hornkamp 38' (pen.), 40' (pen.); Sankoh 90', 90+4' | Report | | Stadium: Erve Asito; Referee: Allard Lindhout |

| 6 April 2024 29 | PSV | 5–1 | AZ | Eindhoven |
| 16:45 UTC+2 | Bakayoko 9'; De Jong 23', 53'; Teze (yellow card) 25'; Boscagli (yellow card) 45'; Veerman 80'; Uneken 90+1' | Report | Belić (yellow card) 13'; Pavlidis 58'; Mijnans (yellow card) 73' | Stadium: Philips Stadion; Attendance: 34,700; Referee: Dennis Johan Higler |

| 13 April 2024 30 | AZ | 3–2 | RKC Waalwijk | Alkmaar |
| 16:45 UTC+2 | Sugawara 66'; Sadiq 75'; Pavlidis 77'; Goes (yellow card) 83' | Report | Min 3', 41', (yellow card) 67'; Lokesa (yellow card) 74'; Vaessen (yellow card) 77' | Stadium: AFAS Stadion; Attendance: 18,309; Referee: Marc Nagtegaal |

| 27 April 2024 31 | NEC | 0–3 | AZ | Nijmegen |
| 16:45 UTC+2 | Proper (yellow card) 66'; Sano (yellow card) 90+3' | Report | D. de Wit 16', (yellow card) 34'; Pavlidis (yellow card) 49', (goal) 58'; Sugawara (yellow card) 74'; M. de Wit (yellow card) 87'; Poku 90+5' | Stadium: Goffertstadion; Attendance: 12,540; Referee: Martin van den Kerkhof |

| 4 May 2024 32 | AZ | 2–1 | Twente | Alkmaar |
| 16:45 UTC+2 | van Bommel (yellow card) 8', (goal) 46'; Sadiq (yellow card) 50'; Belić (yellow card) 59'; Pavlidis 66' | Report | Steijn 5'; Pröpper (yellow card) 30' | Stadium: AFAS Stadion; Attendance: 18,827; Referee: Danny Desmond Makkelie |

| 12 May 2024 33 | Go Ahead Eagles | 0–3 | AZ | Deventer |
| 16:45 UTC+2 | | Report | Sadiq 39'; Mijnans 45+3'; van Brederode 77' | Stadium: De Adelaarshorst |

| 19 May 2024 34 | AZ | 3–3 | Utrecht | Alkmaar |
| 16:45 UTC+2 | M. de Wit 15'; van Bommel 16'; Pavlidis 37', (yellow card) 38'; Sadiq (yellow card) 51'; D. de Wit (red card) 60' | Report | Boussaid 55'; Lammers 71'; Jensen 81' | Stadium: AFAS Stadion; Attendance: 18,937; Referee: Bas Nijhuis |

=== KNVB Cup ===
AZ entered the KNVB Cup in the second round; the draw was made on 4 November 2023. On 21 December 2023, the draw was made for the round of 16. The draw for the quarter-finals was made on 20 January 2024.

| 20 December 2023 Second round | HHC Hardenberg | 2–3 (a.e.t.) | AZ | Hardenberg |
| 20:00 UTC+1 | Fatima 63'; Church 90+4' | Report | Pavlidis 22'; Odgaard 77'; Van Bommel 102' | Stadium: De Boshoek; Attendance: 4,150; Referee: Robin Hensgens |

| 16 January 2024 Round of 16 | AZ | 3–3 (a.e.t.) (4–2 p) | Quick Boys | Alkmaar |
| 21:00 UTC+1 | D. de Wit 70'; Poku 72'; Van Brederode 97' | Report | Nwankwo 59'; De Beste 90+7'; S. van Duijn 113' | Stadium: AFAS Stadion; Attendance: 7,578; Referee: Edwin van de Graaf |
| | Penalties |
| | D. de Wit (penalty missed); Clasie (penalty scored); Pavlidis (penalty scored); Van Brederode (penalty scored); Odgaard (penalty scored) | | (penalty scored) Van den Meiracker; (penalty missed) Franken; (penalty missed) L. van Duijn; (penalty scored) Nwankwo |

| 7 February 2024 Quarter-finals | Feyenoord | 2–0 | AZ | Rotterdam |
| 21:00 UTC+1 | Geertruida 44'; Nieuwkoop 86' | Report | | Stadium: De Kuip; Attendance: 47,500; Referee: Bas Nijhuis |

=== UEFA Europa Conference League ===
==== Third qualifying round ====
The draw for the third qualifying round was held on 24 July 2023.

| 10 August 2023 First leg | FC Santa Coloma (Andorra) | 0–1 | (Netherlands) AZ | Andorra la Vella, Andorra |
| 19:00 UTC+2 | Crespo Zurita (yellow card) 45'; Novoa (yellow card) 71' | Report | Mihailović 74'; Møller Wolfe (yellow card) 86' | Stadium: Estadi Nacional; Attendance: 716; Referee: Sayat Karabayev (Kazakhstan) |
Note: FC Santa Coloma played their third qualifying round home match at the Estadi Nacional in Andorra la Vella, instead of their regular stadium, the Estadi Comunal d'Andorra la Vella in Andorra la Vella, which did not meet UEFA requirements.

| 17 August 2023 Second leg | AZ (Netherlands) | 2–0 (3–0 agg.) | (Andorra) FC Santa Coloma | Alkmaar, Netherlands |
| 20:45 UTC+2 | Van Bommel 40'; Mijnans (yellow card) 45+1'; Clasie (yellow card) 59'; D. de Wit (yellow card) 66'; Lahdo 78' | Report | Toribio (yellow card) 78' | Stadium: AFAS Stadion; Attendance: 10,014; Referee: Henrik Nalbandyan (Armenia) |

==== Play-off round ====
The draw for the play-off round was held on 7 August 2023.

| 24 August 2023 First leg | AZ (Netherlands) | 1–1 | (Norway) Brann | Alkmaar, Netherlands |
| 20:45 UTC+2 | Chatzidiakos 71' | Report | Castro (yellow card) 31', (goal) 59'; Heltne Nilsen (yellow card) 45+2'; Pallesen Knudsen (yellow card) 65' | Stadium: AFAS Stadion; Attendance: 10,888; Referee: Evangelos Manouchos (Greece) |

| 31 August 2023 Second leg | Brann (Norway) | 3–3 (a.e.t.) (4–4 agg.) (5–6 p) | (Netherlands) AZ | Bergen, Norway |
| 19:00 UTC+2 | Heltne Nilsen (yellow card) 39'; Pallesen Knudsen 45+1', (yellow card) 54'; Soltvedt 66'; Sery 82'; Børsting (yellow card) 90+6'; Horn Myhre (red card) 120+1' | Report | Lahdo 12', (yellow card) 77'; Pavlidis (yellow card) 20'; Mijnans 29'; Van Bommel 50'; D. de Wit (yellow card) 58'; Møller Wolfe (yellow card) 65'; Ryan (yellow card) 75'; Sugawara (yellow card) 81' | Stadium: Brann Stadion; Attendance: 14,355; Referee: Gergő Bogár (Hungary) |
| | Penalties |
| | Finne (penalty scored); Heltne Nilsen (penalty scored); Heggebø (penalty scored); Simba (penalty scored); Soltvedt (penalty scored); Børsting (penalty missed) | | (penalty scored) D. de Wit; (penalty scored) Sugawara; (penalty scored) Odgaard; (penalty scored) Mijnans; (penalty scored) Mihailović; (penalty scored) Penetra |

==== Group stage ====
The draw for the group stage was held on 1 September 2023.

| Pos | Team | Pld | W | D | L | GF | GA | GD | Pts | Qualification | AVL | LEG | AZ | ZRI |
|---|---|---|---|---|---|---|---|---|---|---|---|---|---|---|
| 1 | (England) Aston Villa | 6 | 4 | 1 | 1 | 12 | 7 | +5 | 13 | Advance to round of 16 | — | 2–1 | 2–1 | 1–0 |
| 2 | (Poland) Legia Warsaw | 6 | 4 | 0 | 2 | 10 | 6 | +4 | 12 | Advance to knockout round play-offs | 3–2 | — | 2–0 | 2–0 |
| 3 | (Netherlands) AZ | 6 | 2 | 0 | 4 | 7 | 12 | −5 | 6 | | 1–4 | 1–0 | — | 1–0 |
| 4 | (Bosnia and Herzegovina) Zrinjski Mostar | 6 | 1 | 1 | 4 | 6 | 10 | −4 | 4 | | 1–1 | 1–2 | 4–3 | — |

Source: UEFA
Rules for classification: Group stage tiebreakers

| 21 September 2023 1 | Zrinjski Mostar (Bosnia and Herzegovina) | 4–3 | (Netherlands) AZ | Mostar, Bosnia and Herzegovina |
| 18:45 | Kožulj 48', 81'; Ćorluka 68'; Hrvanović 71' | Report | Van Brederode 10'; Mijnans 32'; D. de Wit 44' | Stadium: Stadion pod Bijelim Brijegom; Attendance: 5,100; Referee: Don Robertson (Scotland) |

| 5 October 2023 2 | AZ (Netherlands) | 1–0 | (Poland) Legia Warsaw | Alkmaar, Netherlands |
| 21:00 | Pavlidis 52' | Report | | Stadium: AFAS Stadion; Attendance: 14,239; Referee: Nenad Minaković (Serbia) |

| 26 October 2023 3 | AZ (Netherlands) | 1–4 | (England) Aston Villa | Alkmaar, Netherlands |
| 18:45 | Sadiq 65' | Report | Bailey 13'; Tielemans 23'; Watkins 51'; McGinn 56' | Stadium: AFAS Stadion; Attendance: 16,633; Referee: Sven Jablonski (Germany) |

| 9 November 2023 4 | Aston Villa (England) | 2–1 | (Netherlands) AZ | Birmingham, England |
| 21:00 | Diego Carlos 61'; Watkins 81' | Report | Pavlidis 52' | Stadium: Villa Park; Attendance: 35,156; Referee: Luis Godinho (Portugal) |

| 30 November 2023 5 | AZ (Netherlands) | 1–0 | (Bosnia and Herzegovina) Zrinjski Mostar | Alkmaar, Netherlands |
| 18:45 | Pavlidis 59' (pen.) | Report | | Stadium: AFAS Stadion; Attendance: 17,132; Referee: Oleksiy Derevinskyi (Ukraine) |

| 14 December 2023 6 | Legia Warsaw (Poland) | 2–0 | (Netherlands) AZ | Warsaw, Poland |
| 18:45 | Ribeiro 34'; Kramer 81' | Report | Martins Indi (red card) 53' | Stadium: Stadion Wojska Polskiego; Referee: Harald Lechner (Austria) |
