= 2022–23 AZ Alkmaar season =

AZ Alkmaar
2022–23 season
- Chairman: René Neelissen
- Head coach: Pascal Jansen
- Stadium: AFAS Stadion
- Eredivisie: 4th
- KNVB Cup: Round of 16
- UEFA Europa Conference League: Semi-finals
- Top goalscorer: League: Vangelis Pavlidis (12); All: Vangelis Pavlidis (22)
- Highest home attendance: 18,772 (vs. Ajax, 18 September 2022)
- Lowest home attendance: 8,523 (vs. Vaduz, 15 September 2022)
- Biggest win: 7–0 (vs. Dundee United (H), 11 August 2022 UEFA Conference League)
- Biggest defeat: 1–3 (vs. Feyenoord (H), 16 October 2022 Eredivisie); 1–3 (vs. RKC Waalwijk (A), 6 November 2022 Eredivisie)
Home colours	Away colours

The 2022–23 season was the 56th in the history of AZ Alkmaar and their 25th consecutive season in the top flight. The club participated in the Eredivisie, the KNVB Cup, and the UEFA Europa Conference League.

== Players ==
As of 1 September 2022

Note: Flags indicate national team as defined under FIFA eligibility rules; some limited exceptions apply. Players may hold more than one non-FIFA nationality.

No.	Pos.	Nation	Player
1	GK	DEN	Peter Vindahl Jensen
2	DF	JPN	Yukinari Sugawara
3	DF	GRE	Pantelis Hatzidiakos
4	DF	NED	Bruno Martins Indi (captain)
5	DF	HUN	Milos Kerkez
6	MF	NED	Tijjani Reijnders
7	FW	DEN	Jens Odgaard
8	MF	NED	Jordy Clasie
9	FW	GRE	Vangelis Pavlidis
10	MF	NED	Dani de Wit
11	FW	SWE	Jesper Karlsson
12	GK	NED	Hobie Verhulst
13	GK	NED	Sem Westerveld

No.	Pos.	Nation	Player
14	MF	NED	Peer Koopmeiners
17	FW	TUR	Yusuf Barası
18	MF	NOR	Håkon Evjen
19	FW	NED	Myron van Brederode
21	FW	NED	Ernest Poku
22	DF	NED	Maxim Dekker
23	FW	SWE	Mayckel Lahdo
25	MF	NED	Riechedly Bazoer
27	DF	BEL	Zinho Vanheusden (on loan from Inter)
28	MF	NED	Zico Buurmeester
31	DF	NED	Sam Beukema
34	DF	NED	Mees de Wit

=== Out on loan ===
Note: Flags indicate national team as defined under FIFA eligibility rules; some limited exceptions apply. Players may hold more than one non-FIFA nationality.

No.	Pos.	Nation	Player
—	FW	NED	Jelle Duin (at Aarhus GF until 30 June 2023)
—	GK	NED	Mees Bakker (at De Graafschap until 30 June 2023)

No.	Pos.	Nation	Player
—	MF	NED	Kenzo Goudmijn (at Excelsior until 30 June 2023)

== Pre-season and friendlies ==
Win Draw Loss Fixtures

2 July 2022 Friendly	AZ (Netherlands)	3–1	(Netherlands) PEC Zwolle	Dirkshorn
16:00 CEST (UTC+2)	Barası 10'; Lahdo 23'; Pavlidis 55'		Landu 68'	Stadium: Sportpark Dirkshorn

6 July 2022 Friendly	AZ (Netherlands)	2–2	(Greece) PAOK	Wenum-Wiesel
19:00 CEST (UTC+2)	Pavlidis 27'; Griffith 72'		A. Živković 5'; Kargas 13'	Stadium: Sportpark Wiesel

9 July 2022 Friendly	Olympiacos (Greece)	1–0	(Netherlands) AZ	Piraeus, Greece
20:30 EEST (UTC+3)	Abou Cissé 45'			Stadium: Karaiskakis Stadium

16 July 2022 Friendly	Westerlo (Belgium)	0–1	(Netherlands) AZ	Westerlo, Belgium
16:00 CEST (UTC+2)			Evjen 88'	Stadium: Het Kuipje

24 July 2022 Friendly	AZ (Netherlands)	1–0	(Italy) Bologna	Alkmaar, Netherlands
17:00 CEST (UTC+2)	Buurmeester 41'	Report		Stadium: AFAS Stadion; Attendance: 3,000; Referee: Clay Ruperti (Netherlands)

29 December 2022 Friendly	Atalanta (Italy)	0–1	(Netherlands) AZ	Bergamo
19:00 CET (UTC+1)	Zapata (penalty missed) 79'	Report	Evjen 1'	Stadium: Gewiss Stadium

== Competitions ==
=== Overall record ===
Competition	First match	Last match	Starting round	Final position	Record							
Competition	First match	Last match	Starting round	Final position	Pld	W	D	L	GF	GA	GD	Win %
Eredivisie	7 August 2022	28 May 2023	Matchday 1	4th	34	20	7	7	68	35	+33	58.82
KNVB Cup	11 January 2023	7 February 2023	Second round	Round of 16	2	1	0	1	5	3	+2	50.00
UEFA Europa Conference League	21 July 2022	18 May 2023	Second qualifying round	Semi-finals	18	13	0	5	37	15	+22	72.22
Total					54	34	7	13	110	53	+57	62.96

Source: Soccerway

=== Eredivisie ===
==== League table ====
Pos	Team	Pld	W	D	L	GF	GA	GD	Pts	Qualification or relegation
2	PSV Eindhoven	34	23	6	5	89	40	+49	75	Qualification to Champions League third qualifying round
3	Ajax	34	20	9	5	86	38	+48	69	Qualification to Europa League play-off round
4	AZ	34	20	7	7	68	35	+33	67	Qualification to Europa Conference League third qualifying round
5	Twente (O)	34	18	10	6	66	27	+39	64	Qualification to European competition play-offs
6	Sparta Rotterdam	34	17	8	9	60	37	+23	59	Qualification to European competition play-offs

Source: Eredivisie
Rules for classification: Season in progress: 1) Most points won; 2) Less points lost; 3) Goal difference; 4) Goals scored; 5) Alphabetical order; End of season: 1) Points; 2) Goal difference; 3) Goals scored; 4) Head-to-head points; 5) Head-to-head goal difference; 6) Head-to-head away goals scored; 7) Play-off if relevant for deciding champion, relegation or participating in a European league, otherwise by draw. 8) Penalty shoot-out (only after a play-off)
(O) Play-off Winner

==== Results summary ====
Overall								Home						Away					
Pld	W	D	L	GF	GA	GD	Pts	W	D	L	GF	GA	GD	W	D	L	GF	GA	GD
34	20	7	7	68	35	+33	67	9	5	3	36	20	+16	11	2	4	32	15	+17

Source: Eredivisie

==== Results by round ====
Round	1	2	4	3	5	6	7	8	9	10	11	12	13	14	15	16	17	18	19	20	21	22	23	24	25	26	27	28	29	30	31	32	33	34
Ground	H	A	A	H	A	H	H	A	A	H	A	H	A	A	H	A	H	A	H	A	H	A	H	A	H	A	H	H	A	H	A	H	A	H
Result	W	W	W	D	W	D	W	W	W	L	L	W	L	W	D	W	W	W	D	D	W	L	W	W	W	L	D	L	W	W	D	W	W	L
Position	3	5	4	4	3	4	3	1	1	4	4	3	4	4	5	2	2	2	2	2	2	3	3	3	3	4	4	4	4	4	4	4	4	4

Source: Eredivisie
A = Away; H = Home; W = Win; D = Draw; L = Loss

==== Matches ====
The league fixtures were announced on 14 June 2022.

7 August 2022 1	AZ	2–0	Go Ahead Eagles	Alkmaar
16:45 CEST (UTC+2)	Pavlidis 70'; Van Brederode 86'	Report		Stadium: AFAS Stadion; Attendance: 14,438; Referee: Allard Lindhout

14 August 2022 2	Sparta Rotterdam	2–3	AZ	Rotterdam
16:45 CEST (UTC+2)	Van Crooij 1', 59'	Report	D. de Wit 57'; Kerkez 65'; Pavlidis 45+1' (pen.)	Stadium: Sparta Stadion Het Kasteel; Attendance: 9,631; Referee: Jannick van der Laan

28 August 2022 4	SC Cambuur	0–1	AZ	Leeuwarden
16:45 CEST (UTC+2)		Report	Clasie 90'	Stadium: Cambuur Stadion; Attendance: 10,000; Referee: Rob Dieperink

1 September 2022 3	AZ	1–1	NEC	Alkmaar
20:00 CEST (UTC+2)	Odgaard 57'	Report	Márquez 54'	Stadium: AFAS Stadion; Attendance: 14,945; Referee: Dennis Higler

4 September 2022 5	FC Emmen	0–3	AZ	Emmen
14:30 CEST (UTC+2)		Report	Odgaard 21'; D. de Wit 27'; Reijnders 34'	Stadium: De Oude Meerdijk; Attendance: 8,062; Referee: Martin Pérez

11 September 2022 6	AZ	1–1	FC Twente	Alkmaar
14:30 CEST (UTC+2)	Odgaard 54'	Report	Ugalde 81'	Stadium: AFAS Stadion; Attendance: 16,269; Referee: Pol van Boekel

18 September 2022 7	AZ	2–1	Ajax	Alkmaar
16:45 CEST (UTC+2)	M. de Wit 40'; Odgaard 45+6'	Report	Kudus 12'	Stadium: AFAS Stadion; Attendance: 18,772; Referee: Bas Nijhuis

1 October 2022 8	FC Groningen	1–4	AZ	Groningen
21:00 CEST (UTC+2)	Pepi 42'	Report	de Wit 3'; Karlsson 19'; Kerkez 61'; Lahdo 85'	Stadium: Hitachi Capital Mobility Stadion; Attendance: 18,890; Referee: Jeroen Manschot

9 October 2022 9	FC Utrecht	1–2	AZ	Utrecht
16:45 CEST (UTC+2)	Sylla 90+3'	Report	van Brederode 31'; Sugawara 68'	Stadium: Stadion Galgenwaard; Attendance: 20,873; Referee: Serdar Gözübüyük

16 October 2022 10	AZ	1–3	Feyenoord	Alkmaar
16:45 CEST (UTC+2)	Odgaard 26'	Report	Kökçu 31' (pen.); Szymański 56'; Danilo 82'	Stadium: AFAS Stadion; Attendance: 17,039; Referee: Danny Makkelie

23 October 2022 11	Excelsior	2–1	AZ	Rotterdam
12:15 CET (UTC+1)	Horemans 6'; Azarkan 31'	Report	Sugawara 48'	Stadium: Van Donge & De Roo Stadion; Attendance: 4,400; Referee: Allard Lindhout

30 October 2022 12	AZ	2–1	FC Volendam	Alkmaar
16:45 CET (UTC+1)	Odgaard 20'; Reijnders 40'	Report	H. Veerman 48'	Stadium: AFAS Stadion; Attendance: 18,255; Referee: Joey Kooij

6 November 2022 13	RKC Waalwijk	3–1	AZ	Waalwijk
16:45 CET (UTC+1)	Bel Hassani 32'; Bakkali 87', 90+2'	Report	Karlsson 9'	Stadium: Mandemakers Stadion; Attendance: 5,067; Referee: Martin van den Kerkhof

12 November 2022 14	PSV	0–1	AZ	Eindhoven
21:00 CET (UTC+1)		Report	Pavlidis 18'	Stadium: Philips Stadion; Attendance: 33,009; Referee: Serdar Gözübüyük

7 January 2023 15	AZ	1–1	Vitesse	Alkmaar
18:45 CET (UTC+1)	Pavlidis 77'	Report	Sankoh 87'	Stadium: AFAS Stadion; Attendance: 17,277; Referee: Jochem Kamphuis

14 January 2023 16	SC Heerenveen	0–2	AZ	Heerenveen
18:45 CET (UTC+1)		Report	D. de Wit 33'; Reijnders 46'	Stadium: Abe Lenstra Stadion; Attendance: 20,019; Referee: Serdar Gözübüyük

22 January 2023 17	AZ	3–1	Fortuna Sittard	Alkmaar
16:45 CET (UTC+1)	D. de Wit 4'; Navarro 24' (o.g.); Pavlidis 56'	Report	Yılmaz 11' (pen.)	Stadium: AFAS Stadion; Attendance: 16,652; Referee: Dennis Higler

25 January 2023 18	Go Ahead Eagles	1–4	AZ	Deventer
18:45 CET (UTC+1)	Willumsson 90+2' (pen.)	Report	Pavlidis 38'; Mihailovic 57'; Sugawara 87'; Buurmeester 90+5'	Stadium: De Adelaarshorst; Attendance: 9,457; Referee: Allard Lindhout

28 January 2023 19	AZ	5–5	FC Utrecht	Alkmaar
21:00 CET (UTC+1)	Dekker 20'; Pavlidis 31', 34', 78'; M. de Wit 70'	Report	Douvikas 12', 16', 65'; Viergever 41'; van de Streek 80'	Stadium: AFAS Stadion; Attendance: 16,765; Referee: Edwin van de Graaf

4 February 2023 20	FC Volendam	1–1	AZ	Volendam
18:45 CET (UTC+1)	Mbuyamba 62'	Report	Odgaard 83'	Stadium: Kras Stadion; Attendance: 6,850; Referee: Martin Pérez

10 February 2023 21	AZ	5–0	Excelsior	Alkmaar
20:00 CET (UTC+1)	Mijnans 20', 30'; Karlsson 27'; Odgaard 35'; Pavlidis 38'	Report		Stadium: AFAS Stadion; Attendance: 16,187; Referee: Alex Bos

18 February 2023 22	Feyenoord	2–1	AZ	Rotterdam
21:00 CET (UTC+1)	Jahanbakhsh 45+2'; Pedersen 90'	Report	Dilrosun 17' (o.g.)	Stadium: De Kuip; Attendance: 47,500; Referee: Dennis Higler

25 February 2023 23	AZ	2–1	SC Cambuur	Alkmaar
20:00 CET (UTC+1)	Pavlidis 40'; Goes 73'	Report	Johnsen 85' (pen.)	Stadium: AFAS Stadion; Attendance: 16,869; Referee: Marc Nagtegaal

5 March 2023 24	Vitesse	0–1	AZ	Arnhem
20:00 CET (UTC+1)		Report	Karlsson 29'	Stadium: GelreDome; Attendance: 16,367; Referee: Danny Makkelie

12 March 2023 25	AZ	1–0	FC Groningen	Alkmaar
14:30 CET (UTC+1)	Karlsson 4'	Report		Stadium: AFAS Stadion; Attendance: 16,526; Referee: Pol van Boekel

19 March 2023 26	FC Twente	2–1	AZ	Enschede
20:00 CET (UTC+1)	Ugalde 8', 11'	Report	Karlsson 66'	Stadium: De Grolsch Veste; Attendance: 29,500; Referee: Allard Lindhout

1 April 2023 27	AZ	1–1	SC Heerenveen	Alkmaar
16:30 CEST (UTC+2)	Mous 75' (o.g.)	Report	van Hooijdonk 5'	Stadium: AFAS Stadion; Attendance: 18,393; Referee: Jochem Kamphuis

8 April 2023 28	AZ	0–1	Sparta Rotterdam	Alkmaar
20:00 CEST (UTC+2)		Report	Lauritsen 45+1'	Stadium: AFAS Stadion; Attendance: 18,002; Referee: Danny Makkelie

16 April 2023 29	Fortuna Sittard	0–3	AZ	Sittard
20:00 CEST (UTC+2)		Report	Odgaard 24'; Kerkez 42'; Pavlidis 84'	Stadium: Fortuna Sittard Stadion; Attendance: 9,825; Referee: Serdar Gözübüyük

23 April 2023 30	AZ	3–0	RKC Waalwijk	Alkmaar
20:00 CEST (UTC+2)	Mijnans 8'; Lahdo 50'; van Brederode 63'	Report		Stadium: AFAS Stadion; Attendance: 16,787; Referee: Allard Lindhout

6 May 2023 31	Ajax	0–0	AZ	Amsterdam
21:00 CEST (UTC+2)		Report		Stadium: Johan Cruyff Arena; Attendance: 53,841; Referee: Danny Makkelie

14 May 2023 32	AZ	5–1	FC Emmen	Alkmaar
20:00 CEST (UTC+2)	Mijnans 13'; van Brederode 15'; Reijnders 23'; Beukema 28'; Clasie 45+1'	Report	Živković 50'	Stadium: AFAS Stadion; Attendance: 16,481; Referee: Edwin van de Graaf

21 May 2023 33	N.E.C.	0–3	AZ	Nijmegen
14:30 CEST (UTC+2)		Report	Karlsson 28', 50'; Clasie 43'	Stadium: Goffertstadion; Attendance: 12,000; Referee: Sander van der Eijk

28 May 2023 34	AZ	1–2	PSV	Alkmaar
14:30 CEST (UTC+2)	Karlsson 84' (pen.)	Report	Simons 65', 90+8'	Stadium: AFAS Stadion; Referee: Danny Makkelie

=== KNVB Cup ===
11 January 2023 Second round	Excelsior	1–4	AZ	Rotterdam
18:45 CET (UTC+1)	Kharchouch 32'	Report	Odgaard 13'; D. de Wit 35'; Karlsson 39'; Pavlidis 79'	Stadium: Van Donge & De Roo Stadion; Attendance: 4.300; Referee: Bas Nijhuis

7 February 2023 Round of 16	AZ	1–2 (a.e.t.)	FC Utrecht	Alkmaar
18:45 CET (UTC+1)	Karlsson 86'	Report	Viergever 58'; Maeda 93'	Stadium: AFAS Stadion; Attendance: 10,214; Referee: Jochem Kamphuis

=== UEFA Europa Conference League ===
==== Second qualifying round ====
The draw for the second qualifying round was held on 15 June 2022.

21 July 2022 Second leg	AZ (Netherlands)	1–0	(Bosnia and Herzegovina) Tuzla City	Alkmaar
20:30 CEST (UTC+2)	D. de Wit 12' (pen.)	Report		Stadium: AFAS Stadion; Attendance: 9,047; Referee: Lukas Fähndrich (Switzerland)

28 July 2022 First leg	Tuzla City (Bosnia and Herzegovina)	0–4 (0–5 agg.)	(Netherlands) AZ	Sarajevo, Bosnia and Herzegovina
20:45 CEST (UTC+2)		Report	D. de Wit 34'; Pavlidis 61'; Lahdo 63'; F. de Jong 81'	Stadium: Stadion Grbavica; Attendance: 4,800; Referee: Ashot Ghaltakhchyan (Armenia)

==== Third qualifying round ====
The draw for the third qualifying round was held on 18 July 2022.

4 August 2022 First leg	Dundee United (Scotland)	1–0	(Netherlands) AZ	Dundee, Scotland
20:00 BST (UTC+1)	Middleton 61'	Report		Stadium: Tannadice Park; Attendance: 10,181; Referee: Vítor Ferreira (Portugal)

11 August 2022 Second leg	AZ (Netherlands)	7–0 (7–1 agg.)	(Scotland) Dundee United	Alkmaar
21:00 CEST (UTC+2)	Pavlidis 21', 36'; Reijnders 31', 41'; Evjen 44'; D. de Wit 46'; Clasie (yellow card) 63'; Lahdo 74'	Report		Stadium: AFAS Stadion; Attendance: 11,005; Referee: Antonio Mateu Lahoz (Spain)

==== Play-off round ====
The draw for the play-off round was held on 2 August 2022.

18 August 2022 First leg	AZ (Netherlands)	4–0	(Portugal) Gil Vicente	Alkmaar, Netherlands
21:00 CEST (UTC+2)	D. de Wit 24', 89'; Lahdo 78'; Pavlidis 85'	Report		Stadium: AFAS Stadion; Attendance: 11,211; Referee: Guillermo Cuadra Fernández (Spain)

25 August 2022 Second leg	Gil Vicente (Portugal)	1–2 (1–6 agg.)	(Netherlands) AZ	Barcelos
20:00 WEST (UTC+1)	Boselli 86'	Report	Evjen 60'; Reijnders 64'	Stadium: Estádio Cidade de Barcelos; Attendance: 4,625; Referee: Fran Jovic (Croatia)

==== Group stage ====
The draw for the group stage was held on 26 August 2022.

Pos	Team	Pld	W	D	L	GF	GA	GD	Pts	Qualification	AZ	DNI	APL	VAD
1	(Netherlands) AZ	6	5	0	1	12	6	+6	15	Advance to round of 16	—	2–1	3–2	4–1
2	(Ukraine) Dnipro-1	6	3	1	2	9	7	+2	10	Advance to knockout round play-offs	0–1	—	1–0	2–2
3	(Cyprus) Apollon Limassol	6	2	1	3	5	7	−2	7		1–0	1–3	—	1–0
4	(Liechtenstein) Vaduz	6	0	2	4	5	11	−6	2		1–2	1–2	0–0	—

Source: UEFA
Rules for classification: Group stage tiebreakers

8 September 2022 1	Dnipro-1 (Ukraine)	0–1	(Netherlands) AZ	Košice, Slovakia
21:00 CEST		Report	D. de Wit 63'	Stadium: Košická futbalová aréna Attendance: 3,347; Referee: Yigal Frid (Israel)

15 September 2022 2	AZ (Netherlands)	4–1	(Liechtenstein) Vaduz	Alkmaar, Netherlands
18:45 CEST	Barası 19'; Beukema 81'; Sugawara 90+2'; D. de Wit 90+5'	Report	Goelzer 22'	Stadium: AFAS Stadion; Attendance: 8,523; Referee: Nick Walsh (Scotland)

6 October 2022 3	AZ (Netherlands)	3–2	(Cyprus) Apollon Limassol	Alkmaar, Netherlands
21:00 CEST	Odgaard 16'; D. de Wit 62' (pen.); Karlsson 85'	Report	Joosten 19'; Cabral 71'	Stadium: AFAS Stadion; Attendance: 10,016; Referee: Rohit Saggi (Norway)

13 October 2022 4	Apollon Limassol (Cyprus)	1–0	(Netherlands) AZ	Nicosia, Cyprus
18:45 CEST	Roberge 32'	Report		Stadium: GSP Stadium; Attendance: 3,011; Referee: Morten Krogh (Denmark)

27 October 2022 5	Vaduz (Liechtenstein)	1–2	(Netherlands) AZ	Vaduz, Liechtenstein
18:45 CEST	Halser 76'; Ulrich (yellow card) 83'	Report	Kerkez 50'; van Brederode 75'	Stadium: Rheinpark Stadion; Attendance: 1.949; Referee: Donald Robertson (Scotland)

3 November 2022 6	AZ (Netherlands)	2–1	(Ukraine) Dnipro-1	Alkmaar, Netherlands
18:45 CET	Odgaard 8'; Pavlidis 87'	Report	Dovbyk 40'	Stadium: AFAS Stadion; Attendance: 12.387; Referee: Anastasios Papapetrou (Greece)

==== Knockout phase ====
===== Round of 16 =====
7 March 2023 First leg	Lazio (Italy)	1–2	(Netherlands) AZ	Rome
18:45 CET(UTC+1)	Pedro 18'	Report	Pavlidis 45'; Kerkez 62'	Stadium: Stadio Olimpico; Attendance: 19,584; Referee: Glenn Nyberg (Sweden)

16 March 2023 Second leg	AZ (Netherlands)	2–1 (4–2 agg.)	(Italy) Lazio	Alkmaar
21:00 CET(UTC+1)	Karlsson 28'; Pavlidis 62'	Report	Felipe Anderson 21'	Stadium: AFAS Stadion; Attendance: 18,500; Referee: Matej Jug (Slovenia)

===== Quarter-finals =====
13 April 2023 First leg	Anderlecht (Belgium)	2–0	(Netherlands) AZ	Brussels
21:00 CET(UTC+1)	Murillo 22'; Ashimeru 70'	Report		Stadium: Constant Vanden Stock Stadium; Attendance: 18,157; Referee: Daniel Siebert (Germany)

20 April 2023 Second leg	AZ (Netherlands)	2–0 (a.e.t.) (2–2 agg.) (4–1 p)	(Belgium) Anderlecht	Alkmaar
18:45 CET (UTC+1)	Pavlidis 5' (pen.), 13'	Report		Stadium: AFAS Stadion; Attendance: 19,500; Referee: Davide Massa (Italy)
	Penalties
	Clasie (penalty scored); Sugawara (penalty scored); Reijnders (penalty scored); Meerdink (penalty scored)		(penalty missed) Vertonghen; (penalty scored) Kana; (penalty missed) Sardella
Note: 2 –2 on aggregate. AZ won 4–1 on penalties.

===== Semi-finals =====
11 May 2023 First leg	West Ham United (England)	2–1	(Netherlands) AZ	London
21:00 (20:00 BST)	Benrahma 67' (pen.); Antonio 76'	Report	Reijnders 41'	Stadium: London Stadium; Attendance: 59,412; Referee: Halil Umut Meler (Turkey)

18 May 2023 Second leg	AZ (Netherlands)	0–1 (1–3 agg.)	(England) West Ham United	Alkmaar
21:00		Report	Fornals 90+4'	Stadium: AFAS Stadion; Attendance: 19,000; Referee: Ivan Kružliak (Slovakia)
