= Jordy Clasie =

Dutch footballer (born 1991)

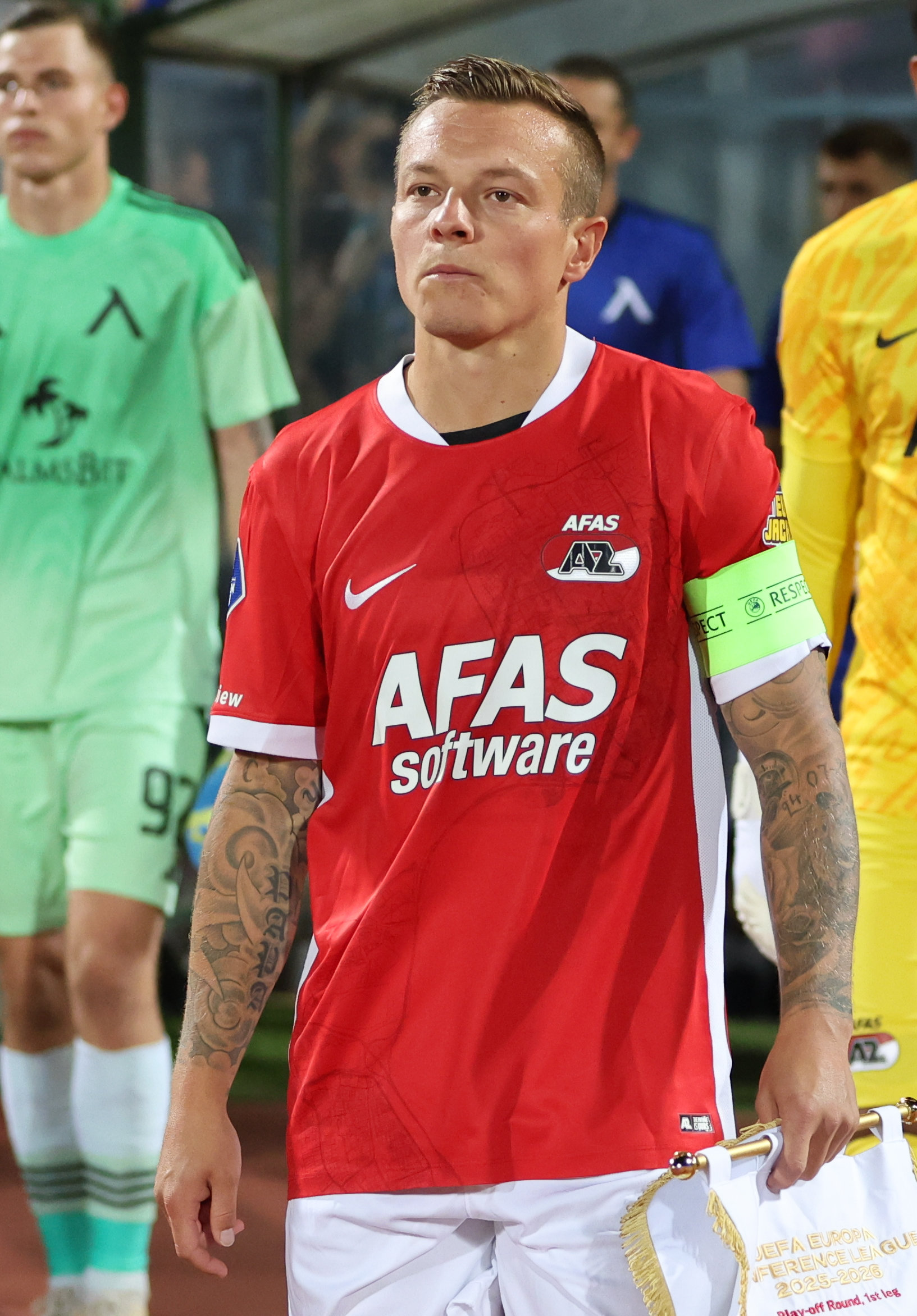
- Clasie playing for AZ in 2025

Personal information
- Full name: Jordy Clasie
- Date of birth: 27 June 1991 (age 35)
- Place of birth: Haarlem, Netherlands
- Height: 1.69 m (5 ft 7 in)
- Position: Defensive midfielder

Team information
- Current team: AZ
- Number: 8

Youth career
- DSK
- -2000: EDO
- 2000–2010: Feyenoord

Senior career*
Years	Team	Apps	(Gls)
2010–2015	Feyenoord	129	(8)
2010–2011	→ Excelsior (loan)	32	(2)
2015–2019	Southampton	38	(1)
2017–2018	→ Club Brugge (loan)	20	(0)
2018–2019	→ Feyenoord (loan)	33	(1)
2019–	AZ	161	(9)

International career
2008–2009	Netherlands U18	3	(0)
2009–2010	Netherlands U19	12	(0)
2010–2013	Netherlands U21	12	(1)
2012–2016	Netherlands	17	(0)
Medal record
Representing Netherlands
FIFA World Cup
Third place	2014
- * Club domestic league appearances and goals as of 06:17, 20 November 2026 (UTC)

Jordy Clasie (Dutch pronunciation: [ˈjɔrdi ˈklaːsi]; born 27 June 1991) is a Dutch professional footballer who plays as a defensive midfielder for and captains Eredivisie club AZ.

== Club career ==
=== Early career ===
Clasie arrived at the youth Feyenoord Academy (Varkenoord) as a 9-year-old in the summer of 2000 and progressed through the ranks to the Feyenoord / Excelsior U19s. In the summer of 2010 the Haarlem-born youngster went out on loan to Excelsior.

Clasie made his professional debut for Excelsior on 15 August 2010, when he was part of the starting line-up in the Rotterdam derby victory against Feyenoord (3–2).

=== Feyenoord ===
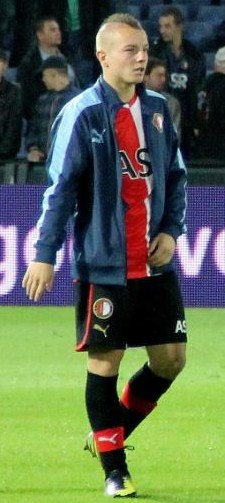
Clasie after a Feyenoord match in 2012

Clasie was brought into the first-team squad at Feyenoord at the start of the 2011–12 season and incoming coach Ronald Koeman immediately handed the youngster a place in the starting line-up. On 31 July 2011, he made his debut for Feyenoord in a friendly game against Málaga. Because of his good play and his tenacity he soon became one of the most popular players among the supporters.

On 29 August 2014, a day after Clasie helped Feyenoord qualify for the group stage of the UEFA Europa League, Clasie agreed to extend his contract until 2018. Clasie explained the decision that he was keen on developing himself as a player within the team as well as developing together with the team as a whole.

=== Southampton ===
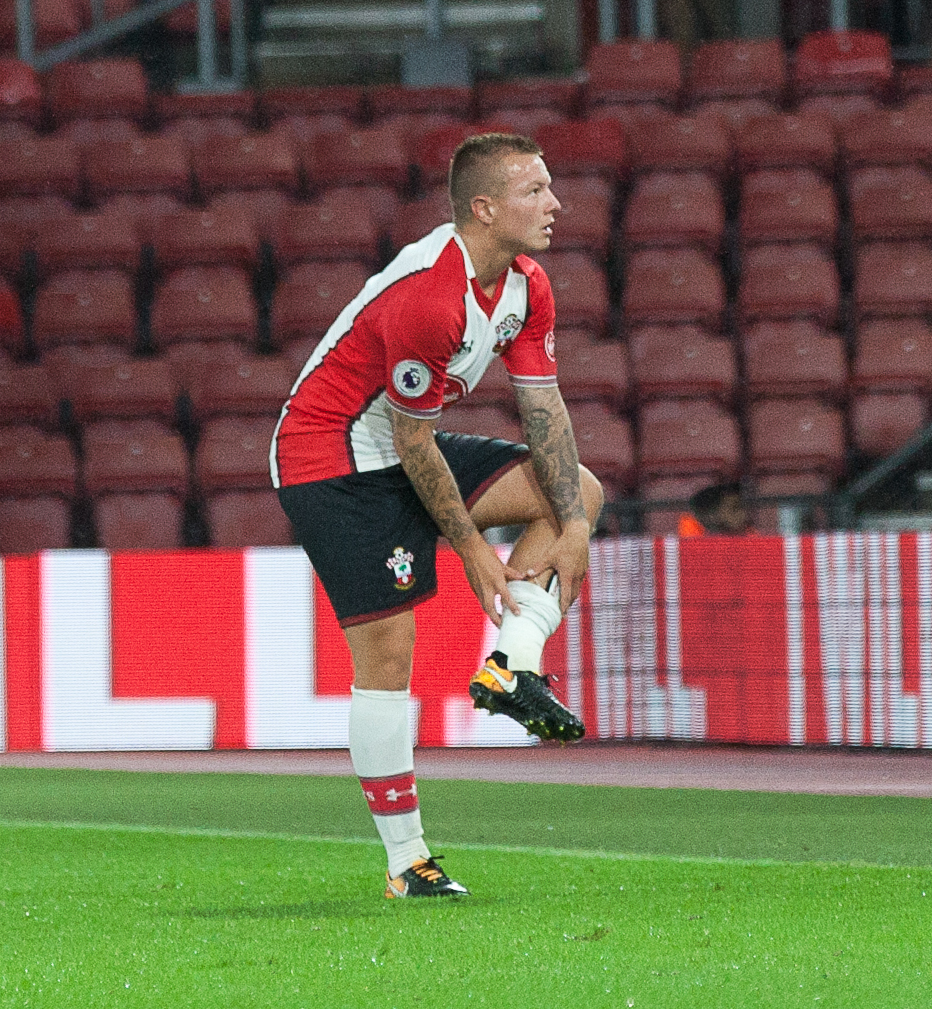
Clasie with Southampton in 2017

On 15 July 2015, Clasie signed for English club Southampton on a five-year deal for a fee in the region of £8 million. This meant he would once again link up with Ronald Koeman who brought him into the Feyenoord first-team.

In the summer of 2016, Frenchman Claude Puel took over at the helm of Southampton. Clasie then scored his first goal for the club on 30 November 2016, in a 2–0 win over Arsenal in the EFL Cup. Clasie's creativity was instrumental in Southampton getting to the League Cup final of 2017 where the Saints eventually emerged as runners up.

He scored his only Premier League goal on 8 April 2017 in a 1–0 victory at West Bromwich Albion.

==== Loans to Club Brugge and Feyenoord ====
On 30 August 2017, Clasie joined Club Brugge on loan for the duration of the 2017–18 season.

On 25 July 2018, the midfielder rejoined Feyenoord on loan for the duration of the 2018–19 season.

=== AZ Alkmaar ===
On 22 July 2019, Clasie signed a two-year contract for AZ Alkmaar, leaving Southampton on a free transfer.

== International career ==
In November 2010, two months after his debut for Excelsior, he was selected for the Netherlands U21 squad. In February 2012, Bert van Marwijk, the coach of the first team of the Netherlands, pronounced his interest in Clasie. He was made aware that his name was on the stand-by list for Euro 2012.

Clasie was part of Louis van Gaal's 23-man squad for the 2014 FIFA World Cup in Brazil where the Dutch finished third beating the likes of defending champions Spain and hosts Brazil. He made two appearances in the tournament, coming on as a substitute for Nigel de Jong in the semi-finals against Argentina and started the third place game against the hosts which the Dutch won 3–0 comfortably.

== Playing style ==
As a combative midfielder with an eye for goal, Clasie's style of play has earned him the label of the "Dutch Xavi".

== Career statistics ==
=== Club ===
As of match played 8 November 2026

Appearances and goals by club, season and competition
Club	Season	League			National cup (Note: Includes KNVB Cup, FA Cup, Belgian Cup)		League cup (Note: Includes EFL Cup)		Europe		Other		Total	
Club	Season	Division	Apps	Goals	Apps	Goals	Apps	Goals	Apps	Goals	Apps	Goals	Apps	Goals
Excelsior (loan)	2010–11	Eredivisie	32	2	1	0	–		–		2 (Note: Appearances in Eredivisie relegation play-offs)	0	35	2
Feyenoord	2011–12	Eredivisie	33	3	0	0	–		–		–		33	3
Feyenoord	2012–13	Eredivisie	33	2	2	0	–		4 (Note: Two appearances in UEFA Champions League, two appearances in UEFA Europa League)	0	–		39	2
Feyenoord	2013–14	Eredivisie	32	1	3	0	–		2 (Note: Appearance(s) in UEFA Europa League)	0	–		37	1
Feyenoord	2014–15	Eredivisie	31	2	1	0	–		12 (Note: Two appearances in UEFA Champions League, ten appearances in UEFA Europa League)	0	2 (Note: Appearances in Eredivisie European play-offs)	0	46	2
Feyenoord	Total		129	8	6	0	–		18	0	2	0	155	8
Southampton	2015–16	Premier League	22	0	1	0	1	0	1	0	–		25	0
Southampton	2016–17	Premier League	16	1	2	0	4	1	2	0	–		24	2
Southampton	Total		38	1	3	0	5	1	3	0	–		49	2
Club Brugge (loan)	2017–18	Belgian Pro League	20	0	5	1	–		0	0	–		25	1
Feyenoord (loan)	2018–19	Eredivisie	33	1	5	0	–		2	0	–		40	1
AZ	2019–20	Eredivisie	18	0	3	0	–		11	0	–		32	0
AZ	2020–21	Eredivisie	8	1	1	0	–		2 (Note: Appearances in UEFA Champions League)	0	–		11	1
AZ	2021–22	Eredivisie	30	1	4	0	–		8 (Note: One appearance in UEFA Europa League, seven appearances and one goal in UEFA Europa Conference League)	1	4	1	46	3
AZ	2022–23	Eredivisie	33	3	2	0	–		18 (Note: Appearances in UEFA Conference League)	0	–		53	3
AZ	2023–24	Eredivisie	28	2	3	0	–		8	0	–		39	2
AZ	2024–25	Eredivisie	24	0	3	0	–		10	1	–		37	1
AZ	2025–26	Eredivisie	12	1	1	0	–		4	0	–		17	1
AZ	2026–27	Eredivisie	8	1	0	0	–		2	0	–		10	1
AZ	Total		161	9	17	0	–		63	2	4	1	245	12
Career total			413	21	37	1	5	1	86	2	7	1	549	26

=== International ===
Appearances and goals by national team and year
National team	Year	Apps	Goals
Netherlands	2012	2	0
Netherlands	2013	4	0
Netherlands	2014	5	0
Netherlands	2015	2	0
Netherlands	2016	4	0
Total		17	0

== Honours ==
Feyenoord

- Johan Cruyff Shield: 2018

Southampton

- EFL Cup runner-up: 2016–17

Club Brugge

- Belgian First Division A: 2017–18

AZ Alkmaar

- KNVB Cup: 2025–26

Netherlands

- FIFA World Cup third place: 2014
