= Tijjani Reijnders =

Dutch footballer (born 1998)

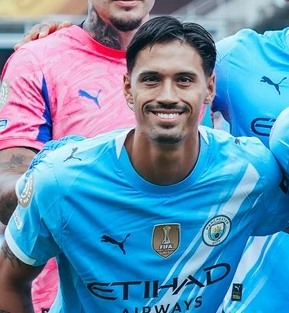
- Reijnders with Manchester City in 2025

Personal information
- Full name: Tijjani Martinus Jan Reijnders
- Date of birth: 29 July 1998 (age 28)
- Place of birth: Zwolle, Netherlands
- Height: 1.85 m (6 ft 1 in)
- Position: Midfielder

Team information
- Current team: Al-Qadsiah
- Number: 14

Youth career
- 2003–2007: WVF Zwolle
- 2007–2011: PEC Zwolle
- 2011–2015: Twente
- 2015–2016: CSV '28
- 2016–2017: PEC Zwolle

Senior career*
Years	Team	Apps	(Gls)
2017	PEC Zwolle	1	(0)
2017–2021	Jong AZ	92	(19)
2018–2023	AZ	96	(9)
2019–2020	→ RKC Waalwijk (loan)	8	(0)
2023–2025	AC Milan	73	(13)
2025–2026	Manchester City	28	(5)
2026–	Al-Qadsiah	10	(8)

International career^{‡}
2018–2019	Netherlands U20	15	(0)
2023–	Netherlands	41	(11)
Medal record
Men's football
Representing Netherlands
UEFA European Championship
Bronze medal – third place	2024 Germany	Team
- * Club domestic league appearances and goals as of 22:37, 29 October 2026 (UTC) ‡ National team caps and goals as of 22:00, 16 November 2026 (UTC)

Tijjani Martinus Jan Reijnders (Dutch pronunciation: [tiˈdʒaːni ˈrɛi̯ndərs]; born 29 July 1998) is a Dutch professional footballer who plays as a midfielder for Saudi Pro League club Al-Qadsiah and the Netherlands national team.

After representing various Dutch junior teams, Reijnders began his career with his hometown club, PEC Zwolle, before moving to fellow Dutch club AZ in the 2017–18 season. He was then loaned to RKC Waalwijk until the conclusion of the 2019–20 campaign, returning to AZ as a mainstay. He signed for AC Milan in the summer of 2023 and won the 2024–25 Supercoppa Italiana. After two years in Italy, he signed for Manchester City in 2025, winning the FA Cup and EFL Cup in his sole season at the club, before being sold to Saudi side Al-Qadsiah in 2026.

Reijnders is a Dutch international, having progressed from the under-20 level onwards. He made his senior international debut for the country in September 2023.

== Club career ==
=== Early career ===
Reijnders started his career with the Twente youth team. He played at Twente until the U-17 team before being released to CSV '28 and playing for one year from 2015 to 2016.

In 2016, Reijnders joined his hometown team PEC Zwolle U-19 where he then moved up the level and appeared in the Eredivisie club's first team.

=== AZ ===
In 2017, development of his career accelerated rapidly. From working at a local Aldi supermarket and training in Zwolle, he crossed over to AZ's Under-21 team and moved up to the first professional team in 2018.

In 2020, he was loaned to RKC Waalwijk for six months, from January to June. Afterwards, Reijnders returned to AZ and became part of the first team, in which he managed to play in the 2022–23 Europa Conference League semi-finals. Reijnders was named to the Eredivisie Team of the Month in September 2022 and April 2023.

=== AC Milan ===
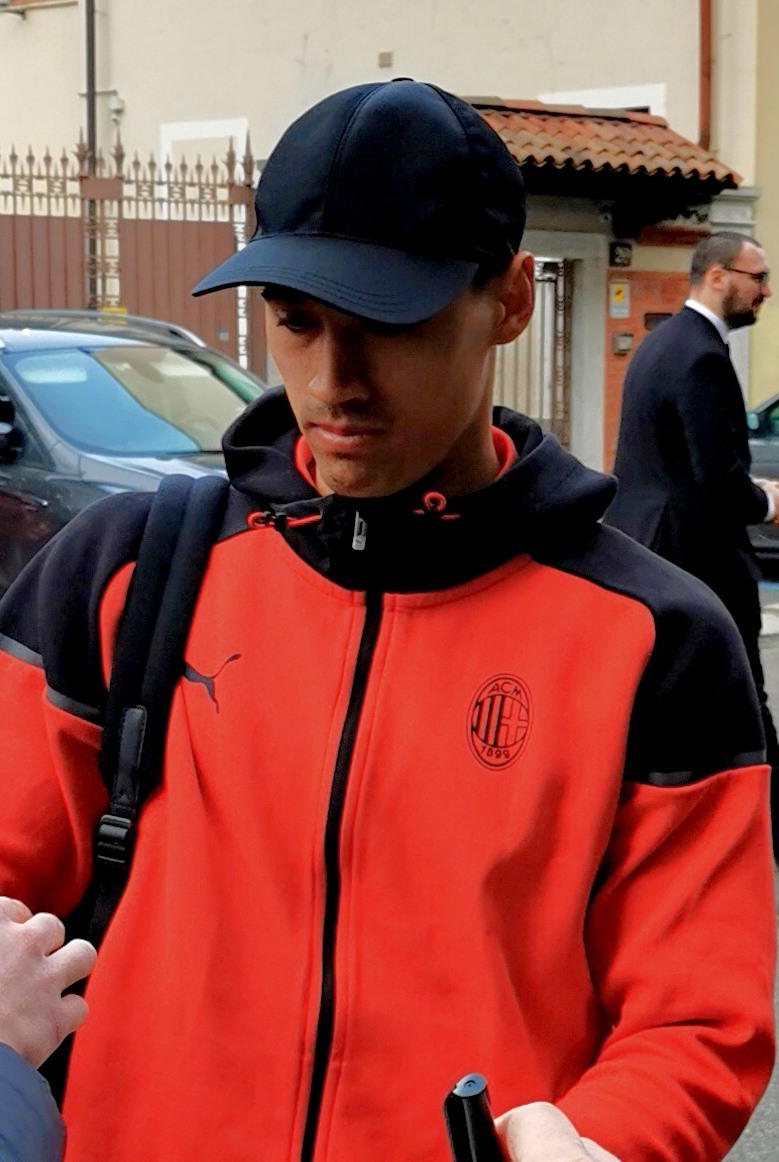
Reijnders with AC Milan in 2024

On 19 July 2023, Reijnders joined Serie A club AC Milan, signing a five-year contract until June 2028. On 21 August, he made his first competitive start for Rossoneri in a Serie A match against Bologna. On 11 November, in a Serie A match against Lecce at the Stadio Via del mare, Reijnders scored his debut goal for Milan. On 3 March 2025, AC Milan announced that Tijjani Reijnders had signed a contract extension, committing to the club until 30 June 2030.

Reijnders was listed on the 2024–25 Serie A Team of the Season and was named the Serie A Best Midfielder of the season.

=== Manchester City ===
On 11 June 2025, Premier League club Manchester City announced the signing of Reijnders on a five-year deal reportedly worth £46.5m. On 16 August, Reijnders made his league debut for the club in a 4–0 away win against Wolverhampton Wanderers, scoring the second goal of the game and assisting Erling Haaland for the third. On 22 March 2026, Reijnders won his first trophy for the club, the Carabao Cup, beating Arsenal 2–0 in the final.

=== Al-Qadsiah ===
On 19 August 2026, Reijnders joined Saudi Pro League club Al-Qadsiah on a four-year deal for a reported £52m fee.

== International career ==
Prior to receiving his first call-up to the Dutch senior team in June 2023 for the UEFA Nations League Finals, Reijnders was also eligible to represent Indonesia through his mother's lineage, but he chose to represent his birth country.

On 7 September 2023, Reijnders made his Netherlands debut as a substitute in a 3–0 win over Greece in a UEFA Euro 2024 qualifier. On 13 October, he made his first start as the Netherlands were defeated 2–1 by France in the same competition.

Reijnders scored his first senior international goal in a 4–0 win over Scotland at the Johan Cruyff Arena on 22 March 2024.

On 29 May 2024, Reijnders was named in the Netherlands' squad for UEFA Euro 2024.

On 27 May 2026, Reijnders was named in the Netherlands' squad for the 2026 FIFA World Cup.

== Style of play ==
Reijnders is a mobile central midfielder with a penchant for going forward into the final third and the opposition's penalty area, to either make attempts at scoring or to press opponents.

Upon his transfer to Milan, he was immediately integrated into the team's starting XI by manager Stefano Pioli as a left-sided central midfielder, known as mezzala in Italy, in a 4–3–3 formation. He also played as part of the double pivot in a 4–2–3–1 formation, again primarily on the left despite being right-footed.

According to Reijnders, tactical reasons played a somewhat significant role in him choosing AC Milan over Barcelona as his proposed playing position in the latter team would have limited his movement.

== Personal life ==
Reijnders is the son of the former footballer Martin Reijnders, as well as the older brother of Eliano Reijnders, a professional footballer who currently plays for Persib Bandung. Reijnders is of Indonesian descent through his Moluccan mother. He was named after former Nigeria and Ajax forward Tijani Babangida.

== Career statistics ==
=== Club ===
As of match played 2 November 2026

Appearances and goals by club, season and competition
Club	Season	League			National cup (Note: Includes KNVB Cup, Coppa Italia, FA Cup)		League cup (Note: Includes EFL Cup)		Continental		Other		Total	
Club	Season	Division	Apps	Goals	Apps	Goals	Apps	Goals	Apps	Goals	Apps	Goals	Apps	Goals
PEC Zwolle	2017–18	Eredivisie	1	0	—		—		—		—		1	0
Jong AZ	2017–18	Eerste Divisie	32	6	—		—		—		—		32	6
Jong AZ	2018–19	Eerste Divisie	36	8	—		—		—		—		36	8
Jong AZ	2019–20	Eerste Divisie	16	3	—		—		—		—		16	3
Jong AZ	2020–21	Eerste Divisie	8	2	—		—		—		—		8	2
Jong AZ	Total		92	19	—		—		—		—		92	19
AZ	2017–18	Eredivisie	1	0	0	0	—		—		—		1	0
AZ	2018–19	Eredivisie	0	0	1	0	—		—		—		1	0
AZ	2019–20	Eredivisie	3	0	0	0	—		—		—		3	0
AZ	2020–21	Eredivisie	22	0	0	0	—		—		—		22	0
AZ	2021–22	Eredivisie	36	6	4	0	—		7 (Note: Appearances in UEFA Europa Conference League)	0	—		47	6
AZ	2022–23	Eredivisie	34	3	2	0	—		18	4	—		54	7
AZ	Total		96	9	7	0	—		25	4	—		128	13
RKC Waalwijk (loan)	2019–20	Eredivisie	8	0	—		—		—		—		8	0
AC Milan	2023–24	Serie A	36	3	2	0	—		12 (Note: Six appearances in UEFA Champions League, six appearances and one goal in UEFA Europa League)	1	—		50	4
AC Milan	2024–25	Serie A	37	10	5	2	—		10 (Note: Appearances in UEFA Champions League)	3	2 (Note: Appearances in Supercoppa Italiana)	0	54	15
AC Milan	Total		73	13	7	2	—		22	4	2	0	104	19
Manchester City	2024–25	Premier League	—		—		—		—		3 (Note: Appearances in FIFA Club World Cup)	0	3	0
Manchester City	2025–26	Premier League	28	5	5	1	4	1	10	0	—		47	7
Manchester City	Total		28	5	5	1	4	1	10	0	3	0	50	7
Al-Qadsiah	2026–27	Saudi Pro League	10	8	0	0	—		4 (Note: Appearances in AFC Champions League Elite)	1	0	0	14	9
Career total			308	53	19	3	4	1	61	9	5	0	397	66

=== International ===
As of match played 16 November 2026

Appearances and goals by national team and year
National team	Year	Apps	Goals
Netherlands	2023	6	0
Netherlands	2024	14	3
Netherlands	2025	9	3
Netherlands	2026	12	5
Total		41	11

As of match played 13 November 2026

Netherlands score listed first, score column indicates score after each Reijnders goal

International goals by date, venue, cap, opponent, score, result and competition
No.	Date	Venue	Cap	Opponent	Score	Result	Competition
1	22 March 2024	Johan Cruyff Arena, Amsterdam, Netherlands	7	Scotland	1–0	4–0	Friendly
2	7 September 2024	Philips Stadion, Eindhoven, Netherlands	16	Bosnia and Herzegovina	2–1	5–2	2024–25 UEFA Nations League A
3	10 September 2024	Johan Cruyff Arena, Amsterdam, Netherlands	17	Germany	1–0	2–2	2024–25 UEFA Nations League A
4	20 March 2025	De Kuip, Rotterdam, Netherlands	21	Spain	2–1	2–2	2024–25 UEFA Nations League A
5	9 October 2025	National Stadium, Ta' Qali, Malta	26	Malta	3–0	4–0	2026 FIFA World Cup qualification
6	17 November 2025	Johan Cruyff Arena, Amsterdam, Netherlands	29	Lithuania	1–0	4–0	2026 FIFA World Cup qualification
7	27 March 2026	Johan Cruyff Arena, Amsterdam, Netherlands	30	Norway	2–1	2–1	Friendly
8	1 October 2026	Toumba Stadium, Thessaloniki, Greece	38	Greece	2–2	2–2	2026–27 UEFA Nations League A
9	13 November 2026	Johan Cruyff Arena, Amsterdam, Netherlands	39	Greece	2–0	7–0	2026–27 UEFA Nations League A
10	13 November 2026	Johan Cruyff Arena, Amsterdam, Netherlands	39	Greece	3–0	7–0	2026–27 UEFA Nations League A
11	13 November 2026	Johan Cruyff Arena, Amsterdam, Netherlands	39	Greece	4–0	7–0	2026–27 UEFA Nations League A

== Honours ==
AC Milan

- Supercoppa Italiana: 2024–25
- Coppa Italia runner-up: 2024–25

Manchester City

- FA Cup: 2025–26
- EFL Cup: 2025–26

Individual

- Serie A Team of the Season: 2024–25
- Serie A Best Midfielder: 2024–25
- The Athletic Serie A Team of the Season: 2024–25
- Serie A Team of the Year: 2024–25
