= 2021–22 AZ Alkmaar season =

AZ Alkmaar
2021–22 season
- Executive director Technical director: Robert Eenhoorn; Max Huiberts
- Chairman: René Neelissen
- Head coach: Pascal Jansen
- Stadium: AFAS Stadion
- Eredivisie: 5th
- KNVB Cup: Semi-finals
- UEFA Europa League: Play-off round
- UEFA Europa Conference League: Round of 16
- Top goalscorer: League: Vangelis Pavlidis (17); All: Vangelis Pavlidis (25)
- Biggest defeat: 0–3 (vs. PSV (h), 11 September 2021)
Home colours	Away colours	Third colours

The 2021–22 season was the 55th season in the existence of AZ Alkmaar and the club's 24th consecutive season in the top flight of Dutch football. In addition to the domestic league, AZ Alkmaar participated in this season's editions of the KNVB Cup, the UEFA Europa League and the UEFA Europa Conference League.

== Players ==
=== First-team squad ===
As of 3 February 2022

Note: Flags indicate national team as defined under FIFA eligibility rules; some limited exceptions apply. Players may hold more than one non-FIFA nationality.

No.	Pos.	Nation	Player
1	GK	DEN	Peter Vindahl Jensen
2	DF	JPN	Yukinari Sugawara
3	DF	GRE	Pantelis Chatzidiakos
4	DF	NED	Bruno Martins Indi
5	DF	NED	Owen Wijndal (captain)
6	MF	NOR	Fredrik Midtsjø
7	FW	MAR	Zakaria Aboukhlal
8	FW	GHA	Kamal Sowah (on loan from Brugge)
9	FW	GRE	Vangelis Pavlidis
10	MF	NED	Dani de Wit
11	FW	SWE	Jesper Karlsson
12	GK	NED	Hobie Verhulst
14	MF	NED	Peer Koopmeiners

No.	Pos.	Nation	Player
15	DF	NOR	Aslak Fonn Witry
16	GK	NED	Beau Reus
17	FW	TUR	Yusuf Barası
18	MF	NOR	Håkon Evjen
19	FW	NED	Jelle Duin
20	MF	NED	Jordy Clasie
21	FW	NED	Ernest Poku
23	MF	NED	Mohamed Taabouni
24	MF	NED	Tijjani Reijnders
26	DF	HUN	Milos Kerkez
30	GK	NED	Mees Bakker
31	DF	NED	Sam Beukema

=== Out on loan ===
Note: Flags indicate national team as defined under FIFA eligibility rules; some limited exceptions apply. Players may hold more than one non-FIFA nationality.

No.	Pos.	Nation	Player
—	FW	NED	Ferdy Druijf (at (Austria) Rapid Wien until 30 June 2022)
—	MF	NED	Kenzo Goudmijn (at SBV Excelsior until 30 June 2022)

No.	Pos.	Nation	Player
—	DF	NED	Joris Kramer (at Go Ahead Eagles until 30 June 2022)
—	DF	NED	Thomas Ouwejan (at (Germany) Schalke 04 until 30 June 2022)

=== Other players under contract ===
Note: Flags indicate national team as defined under FIFA eligibility rules; some limited exceptions apply. Players may hold more than one non-FIFA nationality.

No.	Pos.	Nation	Player
22	DF	NED	Timo Letschert
65	FW	NED	Jeremy Helmer

== Transfers ==
=== Out ===
No.	Pos	Player	Transferred to	Fee	Date	Source
9	FW	Myron Boadu (NED)	Monaco (MON)	€17,000,000	4 August 2021	
11	MF	Albert Guðmundsson (ISL)	Genoa (ITA)	Undisclosed	31 January 2022	

== Pre-season and friendlies ==
Win Draw Loss Fixtures

3 July 2021 Friendly	AZ (Netherlands)	4–1	(Netherlands) N.E.C.	Dirkshorn, Netherlands
16:00 CEST (UTC+2)	Boadu 27'; Aboukhlal 60'; Beukema 76', 87'	Report	Okita 36'	Stadium: Sportpark vv Dirkshorn

7 July 2021 Friendly	AZ (Netherlands)	3–0	(Netherlands) TOP Oss	Wissel, Netherlands
18:30 CEST (UTC+2)	De Wit 12', 69'; Poku 47'	Report		Stadium: Sportpark Ericaweg Epe

14 July 2021 Friendly	Genk (Belgium)	1–1	(Netherlands) AZ	Genk, Belgium
13:00 CEST (UTC+2)	Dessers 78'	Report	Oosting 90'	Stadium: B-Veld Racing Genk

17 July 2021 Friendly	RB Leipzig (Germany)	1–0	(Netherlands) AZ	Leipzig, Germany
18:00 CEST (UTC+2)	Samardžić 51'	Report		Stadium: Trainingszentrum RB Leipzig Platz 1 Attendance: 600

25 July 2021 Friendly	AZ (Netherlands)	3–0	(Greece) Panathinaikos	Alkmaar, Netherlands
16:00 CEST (UTC+2)	Karlsson 12'; Boadu 85'; Reijnders 88'	Report		Stadium: AFAS Stadion

28 July 2021 Friendly	AZ (Netherlands)	2–0	(Greece) OFI	Dirkshorn, Netherlands
16:00 CEST (UTC+2)	Guðmundsson 8'; Berkhout 58'	Report		Stadium: Sportpark vv Dirkshorn

31 July 2021 Friendly	AZ (Netherlands)	1–0	(Spain) Real Sociedad	Alkmaar, Netherlands
17:00 CEST (UTC+2)	Aboukhlal 33'	Report		Stadium: AFAS Stadion; Referee: Marc Nagtegaal

8 August 2021 Friendly	AZ (Netherlands)	2–1	(Italy) Torino	Alkmaar, Netherlands
16:00 CEST (UTC+2)	Karlsson 14'; Pavlidis 86'	Report	Pjaca 1'	Stadium: AFAS Stadion; Referee: Sander van der Eijk

7 January 2022 Friendly	Gent (Belgium)	0–1	(Netherlands) AZ	Oliva, Spain
15:00 CET (UTC+1)

== Competitions ==
=== Overall record ===
Competition	First match	Last match	Starting round	Final position	Record							
Competition	First match	Last match	Starting round	Final position	Pld	W	D	L	GF	GA	GD	Win %
Eredivisie	14 August 2021	15 May 2022	Matchday 1	5th	34	18	7	9	64	44	+20	52.94
Eredivisie Play-offs	19 May 2022	29 May 2022	Semi-finals	Winners	4	2	0	2	11	6	+5	50.00
KNVB Cup	15 December 2021	3 March 2022	Second round	Semi-finals	4	3	0	1	10	4	+6	75.00
UEFA Europa League	18 August 2021	26 August 2021	Play-off round	Play-off round	2	1	0	1	2	3	−1	50.00
UEFA Europa Conference League	16 September 2021	17 March 2022	Group stage	Round of 16	8	4	3	1	11	7	+4	50.00
Total					52	28	10	14	98	64	+34	53.85

Last updated: 29 May 2022
Source: Soccerway

=== Eredivisie ===
==== League table ====
Pos	Team	Pld	W	D	L	GF	GA	GD	Pts	Qualification or relegation
3	Feyenoord	34	22	5	7	76	34	+42	71	Qualification for the Europa League group stage (Note: Since the winners of the 2021–22 KNVB Cup, PSV, qualified for the Champions League based on their league position, the Europa League play-off berth awarded to the KNVB Cup winners was transferred to the third-placed team Feyenoord, the highest-placed team not qualified for the Champions League. Feyenoord qualified for the Europa League group stage as their opponent in the 2022 UEFA Europa Conference League final, Roma, qualified to the Europa League group stage through domestic performance by finishing sixth in the Serie A.)
4	Twente	34	20	8	6	55	37	+18	68	Qualification for the Europa Conference League third qualifying round
5	AZ (O)	34	18	7	9	64	44	+20	61	Qualification for the European competition play-offs
6	Vitesse	34	15	6	13	42	51	−9	51	Qualification for the European competition play-offs
7	Utrecht	34	12	11	11	51	46	+5	47	Qualification for the European competition play-offs

Source: Eredivisie
Rules for classification: Season in progress: 1) Most points won; 2) Less points lost; 3) Goal difference; 4) Goals scored; 5) Alphabetical order; End of season: 1) Points; 2) Goal difference; 3) Goals scored; 4) Head-to-head points; 5) Head-to-head goal difference; 6) Head-to-head away goals scored; 7) Play-off if relevant for deciding champion, relegation or participating in a European league, otherwise by draw. 8) Penalty shoot-out (only after a play-off)
(O) Play-off winners

==== Results summary ====
Overall								Home						Away					
Pld	W	D	L	GF	GA	GD	Pts	W	D	L	GF	GA	GD	W	D	L	GF	GA	GD
34	18	7	9	64	44	+20	61	11	3	3	36	20	+16	7	4	6	28	24	+4

Source: Eredivisie

==== Results by round ====
Round	1	2	3	4	5	6	7	8	9	10	11	12	13	14	15	16	17	18	19	20	21	22	23	24	25	26	27	28	29	30	31	32	33	34
Ground	A	H	A	H	A	A	H	A	H	A	H	A	H	A	H	A	H	H	A	H	A	A	H	H	A	H	A	H	A	H	A	H	A	H
Result	L	W	W	L	L	L	W	W	W	L	W	L	D	D	W	W	W	W	W	D	W	W	W	W	W	L	D	W	L	W	D	D	D	L
Position	11	8	5	9	9	12	10	9	7	7	6	6	8	8	8	8	6	5	5	5	5	4	4	4	4	4	5	4	5	5	5	5	5	5

Source: Eredivisie
A = Away; H = Home; W = Win; D = Draw; L = Loss

==== Matches ====
The league fixtures were announced on 11 June 2021.

14 August 2021 1	RKC Waalwijk	1–0	AZ	Waalwijk
16:30 CEST (UTC+2)	Kramer 44'	Report		Stadium: Mandemakers Stadion; Attendance: 3,860; Referee: Joey Kooij

29 August 2021 3	SC Heerenveen	1–3	AZ	Heerenveen
16:45 CEST (UTC+2)	Veerman 11'	Report	Pavlidis 14'; Fonn Witry 50'; De Wit 88'	Stadium: Abe Lenstra Stadion; Attendance: 16,000; Referee: Bas Nijhuis

11 September 2021 4	AZ	0–3	PSV	Alkmaar
21:00 CEST (UTC+2)		Report	Boscagli 14'; Vertessen 69'; Doan 83'	Stadium: AFAS Stadion; Attendance: 13,000; Referee: Allard Lindhout

19 September 2021 5	Heracles Almelo	3–2	AZ	Almelo
16:45 CEST (UTC+2)	Sierhuis 45+1'; Vloet 90+4'; Burgzorg 72'	Report	Guðmundsson 19'; Reijnders 89'	Stadium: Erve Asito; Attendance: 8,053; Referee: Serdar Gözübüyük

23 September 2021 6	FC Twente	3–1	AZ	Enschede
21:00 CEST (UTC+2	Van Wolfswinkel 1'; Rots 17'; Limminios 90+1'	Report	Karlsson 44'	Stadium: De Grolsch Veste; Attendance: 20,000; Referee: Danny Makkelie

26 September 2021 7	AZ	5–0	Go Ahead Eagles	Alkmaar
14:30 CEST (UTC+2	Karlsson 4', 83' (pen.); de Wit 29'; Aboukhlal 86'; Reijnders 90+1'	Report		Stadium: AFAS Stadion; Attendance: 13,612; Referee: Dennis Higler

3 October 2021 8	SC Cambuur	1–3	AZ	Leeuwarden
14:30 CEST (UTC+2)	Uldriķis	Report	de Wit 16'; Wijndal 33'; Clasie 60'	Stadium: Cambuur Stadion; Attendance: 10,000; Referee: Jochem Kamphuis

17 October 2021 9	AZ	5–1	FC Utrecht	Alkmaar
12:15 CEST (UTC+2)	Pavlidis 6'; Karlsson 12'; De Wit 39', 56'; Gudmundsson 86' (pen.)	Report	Timber 90'	Stadium: AFAS Stadion; Attendance: 17,037; Referee: Kevin Blom

24 October 2021 10	FC Groningen	2–0	AZ	Groningen
CEST (UTC+2)	Ngonge 20'; de Leeuw 71'	Report		Stadium: Euroborg; Attendance: 11,300; Referee: Danny Makkelie

30 October 2021 11	AZ	3–2	PEC Zwolle	Alkmaar
21:00 CEST (UTC+2	De Wit 14'; Pavlidis 38', 52'	Report	de Wit 5', 13'	Stadium: AFAS Stadion; Attendance: 15,328; Referee: Serdar Gözübüyük

7 November 2021 12	Feyenoord	1–0	AZ	Rotterdam
16:45 CET (UTC+1)	Dessers 90+2'	Report		Stadium: De Kuip; Attendance: 47,500; Referee: Allard Lindhout

20 November 2021 13	AZ	1–1	N.E.C.	Alkmaar
20:00 CET (UTC+1)	Aboukhlal 90+3'	Report	Bruijn 9'	Stadium: AFAS Stadion; Attendance: 0 Referee: Jeroen Manschot

28 November 2021 14	Vitesse	0–0	AZ	Arnhem
CET (UTC+1)		Report		Stadium: GelreDome; Attendance: 0 Referee: Danny Makkelie

2 December 2021 2	AZ	2–1	Fortuna Sittard	Alkmaar
18:45 CET (UTC+1)	Pavlidis 41'; Karlsson 51'	Report	Flemming 9'	Stadium: AFAS Stadion; Attendance: 0 Referee: Dennis Higler

5 December 2021 15	AZ	3–1	Sparta Rotterdam	Alkmaar
14:30 CET (UTC+1)	Karlsson 27'; Pavlidis 31', 58'	Report	Auassar	Stadium: AFAS Stadion; Attendance: 0 Referee: Sander van der Eijk

12 December 2021 16	Ajax	1–2	AZ	Amsterdam
16:45 CET (UTC+1)	Haller 73'	Report	Pavlidis 50'; Aboukhlal 83'	Stadium: Johan Cruyff Arena; Attendance: 0 Referee: Bas Nijhuis

18 December 2021 17	AZ	4–1	Willem II	Alkmaar
20:00 CET (UTC+1)	de Wit 8'; Wellenreuther 76' (o.g.); Guðmundsson 86', 89'	Report	Kabangu 36'	Stadium: AFAS Stadion; Attendance: 0 Referee: Allard Lindhout

21 December 2021 18	AZ	1–0	FC Groningen	Alkmaar
21:00 CET (UTC+1)	Karlsson 8'	Report		Stadium: AFAS Stadion; Attendance: 0 Referee: Martin van den Kerkhof

16 January 2022 19	Fortuna Sittard	1–2	AZ	Sittard
16:45 CET (UTC+1)	Rienstra 85'	Report	Beukema 14'; Sugawara 61'	Stadium: Fortuna Sittard Stadion; Attendance: 0 Referee: Rob Dieperink

22 January 2022 20	AZ	0–0	SC Cambuur	Alkmaar
20:00 CET (UTC+1)		Report		Stadium: AFAS Stadion; Attendance: 0 Referee: Bas Nijhuis

5 February 2022 21	PSV	1–2	AZ	Eindhoven
20:00 CET (UTC+1)	Obispo 19'	Report	Martins Indi 40'; Karlsson 75'	Stadium: Philips Stadion; Attendance: 12,000; Referee: Allard Lindhout

13 February 2022 22	Go Ahead Eagles	1–4	AZ	Deventer
12:15 CET (UTC+1)	Brouwers 25'	Report	Beukema 27', 85'; Pavlidis 33', 42'	Stadium: De Adelaarshorst; Attendance: 3,746; Referee: Marc Nagtegaal

19 February 2022 23	AZ	2–1	Heracles Almelo	Alkmaar
21:00 CET (UTC+1)	Reijnders 25'; Pavlidis 48'	Report	Laursen 42'	Stadium: AFAS Stadion; Attendance: 13,616; Referee: Ingmar Oostrom

27 February 2022 24	AZ	2–1	Feyenoord	Alkmaar
12:15 CET (UTC+1)	Karlsson 19' (pen.), 30' (pen.)	Report	Geertruida 52'	Stadium: AFAS Stadion; Attendance: 16,241; Referee: Dennis Higler

6 March 2022 25	N.E.C.	1–3	AZ	Nijmegen
12:15 CET (UTC+1)	Guth 44'	Report	Karlsson 8', 70'; Evjen 76'	Stadium: Goffertstadion; Attendance: 12,000; Referee: Bas Nijhuis

13 March 2022 26	AZ	0–1	FC Twente	Alkmaar
20:00 CET (UTC+1)		Report	Brenet 62'	Stadium: AFAS Stadion; Attendance: 15,349; Referee: Pol van Boekel

20 March 2022 27	Willem II	2–2	AZ	Tilburg
16:00 CET (UTC+1)	Nunnely 7'; Kabangu 17'	Report	Martins Indi 35'; Aboukhlal 90+1'	Stadium: Koning Willem II Stadion; Attendance: 13,064; Referee: Rob Dieperink

2 April 2022 28	AZ	3–1	Vitesse	Alkmaar
15:00 CEST (UTC+2)	Pavlidis 32'; Rasmussen 56' (o.g.); Karlsson 83' (pen.)	Report	Tronstad 63'	Stadium: AFAS Stadion; Attendance: 17,406; Referee: Jeroen Manschot

10 April 2022 29	PEC Zwolle	2–1	AZ	Zwolle
15:00 CEST (UTC+2)	Kastaneer 51'; Redan 86'	Report	Pavlidis 81'	Stadium: MAC³PARK Stadion; Attendance: 12,876; Referee: Allard Lindhout

23 April 2022 30	AZ	2–1	SC Heerenveen	Alkmaar
18:45 CEST (UTC+2)	Karlsson 44'; Reijnders 87'	Report	Sarr 7'	Stadium: AFAS Stadion; Attendance: 17,198; Referee: Martin van den Kerkhof

30 April 2022 31	Sparta Rotterdam	1–1	AZ	Rotterdam
21:00 CEST (UTC+2)	Van Crooij 90+3'	Report	Pavlidis 48'	Stadium: Het Kasteel; Attendance: 10,010; Referee: Edwin van de Graaf

8 May 2022 32	AZ	2–2	Ajax	Alkmaar
16:45 CEST (UTC+2)	Pavlidis 62'; Evjen 75'	Report	Brobbey 42'; Álvarez 86'	Stadium: AFAS Stadion; Attendance: 18,033; Referee: Dennis Higler

11 May 2022 33	FC Utrecht	2–2	AZ	Utrecht
20:00 CEST (UTC+2)	Van de Streek 37'; Douvikas 90+4'	Report	Pavlidis 12', 15'	Stadium: Stadion Galgenwaard; Attendance: 20,085; Referee: Jochem Kamphuis

15 May 2022 34	AZ	1–3	RKC Waalwijk	Alkmaar
14:30 CEST (UTC+2)	De Wit 45+1'	Report	Stokkers 18'; Gaari 64'; Kuijpers 79'	Stadium: AFAS Stadion; Attendance: 17,568; Referee: Sander van der Eijk

==== European competition play-offs ====
19 May 2022 Semi-finals First leg	SC Heerenveen	3–2	AZ	Heerenveen
18:45 CEST (UTC+2)	Van Hooijdonk 58'; Sarr 90'; Halilović 90+5'	Report	Evjen 59'; Pavlidis 65'	Stadium: Abe Lenstra Stadion; Attendance: 15,765; Referee: Jeroen Manschot

22 May 2022 Semi-finals Second leg	AZ	2–0 (4–3 agg.)	SC Heerenveen	Alkmaar
14:30 CEST (UTC+2)	De Wit 5'; Aboukhlal 88'	Report		Stadium: AFAS Stadion; Attendance: 11,521; Referee: Danny Makkelie

26 May 2022 Final First leg	Vitesse	2–1	AZ	Arnhem
20:00 CEST (UTC+2)	Buitink 22'; Openda 86'	Report	Clasie 59'	Stadium: GelreDome; Attendance: 17,547; Referee: Pol van Boekel

29 May 2022 Final Second leg	AZ	6–1 (7–3 agg.)	Vitesse	Alkmaar
14:30 CEST (UTC+2)	Pavlidis 3'; Reijnders 13', 52'; De Wit 41'; Karlsson 75', 89'	Report	Bazoer 78'	Stadium: AFAS Stadion; Attendance: 15,222; Referee: Bas Nijhuis

=== KNVB Cup ===
15 December 2021 Second round	AZ	4–1	Heracles Almelo	Alkmaar
20:00 CET(UTC+1)	Pavlidis 2'; Karlsson 39', 76'; Barası 85'	Report	Başaçıkoğlu 43'	Stadium: AFAS Stadion; Referee: Richard Martens

19 January 2022 Round of 16	FC Twente	1–2	AZ	Enschede
21:00 CET(UTC+1)	van Wolfswinkel 48' (pen.)	Report	Pleguezuelo 63' (pen.); Pavlidis 82'	Stadium: De Grolsch Veste; Referee: Serdar Gözübüyük

9 February 2022 Quarter-finals	RKC Waalwijk	0–4	AZ	Waalwijk
19:00 CET(UTC+1)		Report	de Wit 8'; Pavlidis 23'; Karlsson 33' (pen.); Aboukhlal 71'	Stadium: Mandemakers Stadion; Attendance: 1,543; Referee: Edwin van de Graaf

3 March 2022 Semi-finals	AZ	0–2	Ajax	Alkmaar
20:00 CET (UTC+1)		Report	Berghuis 11'; Klaassen 89'	Stadium: AFAS Stadium; Attendance: 15,802; Referee: Serdar Gözübüyük

=== UEFA Europa League ===
==== Play-off round ====
The draw for the play-off round was held on 2 August 2021.

18 August 2021 First leg	Celtic (Scotland)	2–0	(Netherlands) AZ	Glasgow, Scotland
19:45 BST (UTC+1)	Furuhashi 12'; Letschert 61' (o.g.)	Report		Stadium: Celtic Park; Referee: Ovidiu Hațegan (Romania)

26 August 2021 Second leg	AZ (Netherlands)	2–1 (2–3 agg.)	(Scotland) Celtic	Alkmaar, Netherlands
20:15 CEST (UTC+2)	Aboukhlal 6'; Starfelt 26' (o.g.)	Report	Furuhashi 3'	Stadium: AFAS Stadion; Referee: Tiago Martins (Portugal)

=== UEFA Europa Conference League ===
==== Group stage ====
The draw for the group stage was held on 27 August 2021.

Pos	Team	Pld	W	D	L	GF	GA	GD	Pts	Qualification	AZ	RAN	JAB	CLJ
1	(Netherlands) AZ	6	4	2	0	8	3	+5	14	Advance to round of 16	—	1–0	1–0	2–0
2	(Denmark) Randers	6	1	4	1	9	9	0	7	Advance to knockout round play-offs	2–2	—	2–2	2–1
3	(Czech Republic) Jablonec	6	1	3	2	6	8	−2	6		1–1	2–2	—	1–0
4	(Romania) CFR Cluj	6	1	1	4	4	7	−3	4		0–1	1–1	2–0	—

Source: UEFA
Rules for classification: Group stage tiebreakers

16 September 2021 1	Randers (Denmark)	2–2	(Netherlands) AZ	Randers, Denmark
21:00	Piesinger 27'; Graves 68'	Report	Clasie 24'; Pavlidis 34'	Stadium: Randers Stadium; Attendance: 3,365; Referee: Duje Strukan (Croatia)

30 September 2021 2	AZ (Netherlands)	1–0	(Czech Republic) Jablonec	Alkmaar
18:45	Guðmundsson 53'	Report		Stadium: AFAS Stadion; Attendance: 9,071; Referee: Rade Obrenovič (Slovenia)

21 October 2021 3	CFR Cluj (Romania)	0–1	(Netherlands) AZ	Cluj-Napoca, Romania
21:00 (22:00 EEST)		Report	Karlsson 18'	Stadium: Stadionul Dr. Constantin Rădulescu; Attendance: 3,628; Referee: Halis Özkahya (Turkey)

4 November 2021 4	AZ (Netherlands)	2–0	(Romania) CFR Cluj	Alkmaar
18:45	Guðmundsson 5'; Pavlidis 86'	Report		Stadium: AFAS Stadion; Attendance: 10,554; Referee: Alain Durieux (Luxembourg)

25 November 2021 5	Jablonec (Czech Republic)	1–1	(Netherlands) AZ	Jablonec nad Nisou, Czech Republic
21:00	Kratochvíl 7'	Report	Evjen 44'	Stadium: Stadion Střelnice; Attendance: 2,650; Referee: Manuel Schüttengruber (Austria)

9 December 2021 6	AZ (Netherlands)	1–0	(Denmark) Randers	Alkmaar
18:45	Oosting 87'	Report		Stadium: AFAS Stadion; Attendance: 0 Referee: Trustin Farrugia Cann (Malta)

==== Round of 16 ====
The draw for the round of 16 was held on 25 February 2022.

10 March 2022 First leg	Bodø/Glimt (Norway)	2–1	(Netherlands) AZ	Bodø, Norway
21:00 CET (UTC+1)	Pellegrino 39'; Solbakken 90+1' (pen.)	Report	Aboukhlal 73'	Stadium: Aspmyra Stadion; Attendance: 5,724; Referee: Nikola Dabanović (Montenegro)

17 March 2022 Second leg	AZ (Netherlands)	2–2 (a.e.t.) (3–4 agg.)	(Norway) Bodø/Glimt	Alkmaar
18:45 CET (UTC+1)	Pavlidis 18', 30'	Report	Pellegrino 26'; Sampsted 105+1'	Stadium: AFAS Stadion; Attendance: 15,024; Referee: Ivan Kružliak (Slovakia)
