= Mayckel Lahdo =

Swedish footballer (born 2002)

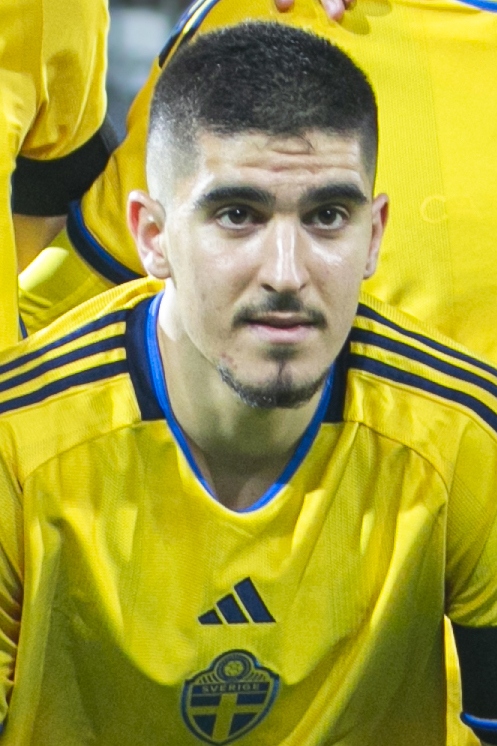
- Lahdo with Sweden U21 in 2023

Personal information
- Date of birth: 30 December 2002 (age 23)
- Place of birth: Stockholm, Sweden
- Height: 1.79 m (5 ft 10 in)
- Position: Winger

Team information
- Current team: Malmö
- Number: 15

Youth career
- –2011: Arameisk-Syrianska IF
- 2012–2013: Hammarby IF
- 2013–2014: Djurgårdens IF
- 2015–2020: Hammarby IF

Senior career*
Years	Team	Apps	(Gls)
2020–2022	Hammarby IF	17	(1)
2020	→ IK Frej (loan)	21	(5)
2021	→ Hammarby TFF (res.)	15	(3)
2022–2023	Jong AZ	6	(1)
2022–2026	AZ	61	(8)
2025–2026	→ Nantes (loan)	8	(1)
2026	→ Brøndby (loan)	9	(1)
2026–	Malmö	2	(0)

International career^{‡}
2022–2024	Sweden U21	10	(2)
- * Club domestic league appearances and goals as of 19 September 2026 ‡ National team caps and goals as of 16:30, 16 October 2024 (UTC)

Mayckel Lahdo (born 30 December 2002) is a Swedish professional footballer who plays as a winger for Allsvenskan club Malmö.

== Early life ==
Lahdo was born in Stockholm to Jony and Ninwe, both of Assyrian and Lebanese descent. His father Jony was a footballer in the Lebanese Premier League before moving to Sweden. He has two brothers, Adrian and Gabriel, who are also footballers, and a sister, Ceilia.

== Club career ==
=== Youth ===
Lahdo was born in Stockholm, Sweden, and started to play football as a youngster with local club Arameisk-Syrianska IF, before moving to Hammarby IF at age nine. After spending a few years with Djurgårdens IF, Lahdo returned to Hammarby's academy at age 12.

=== Hammarby IF ===
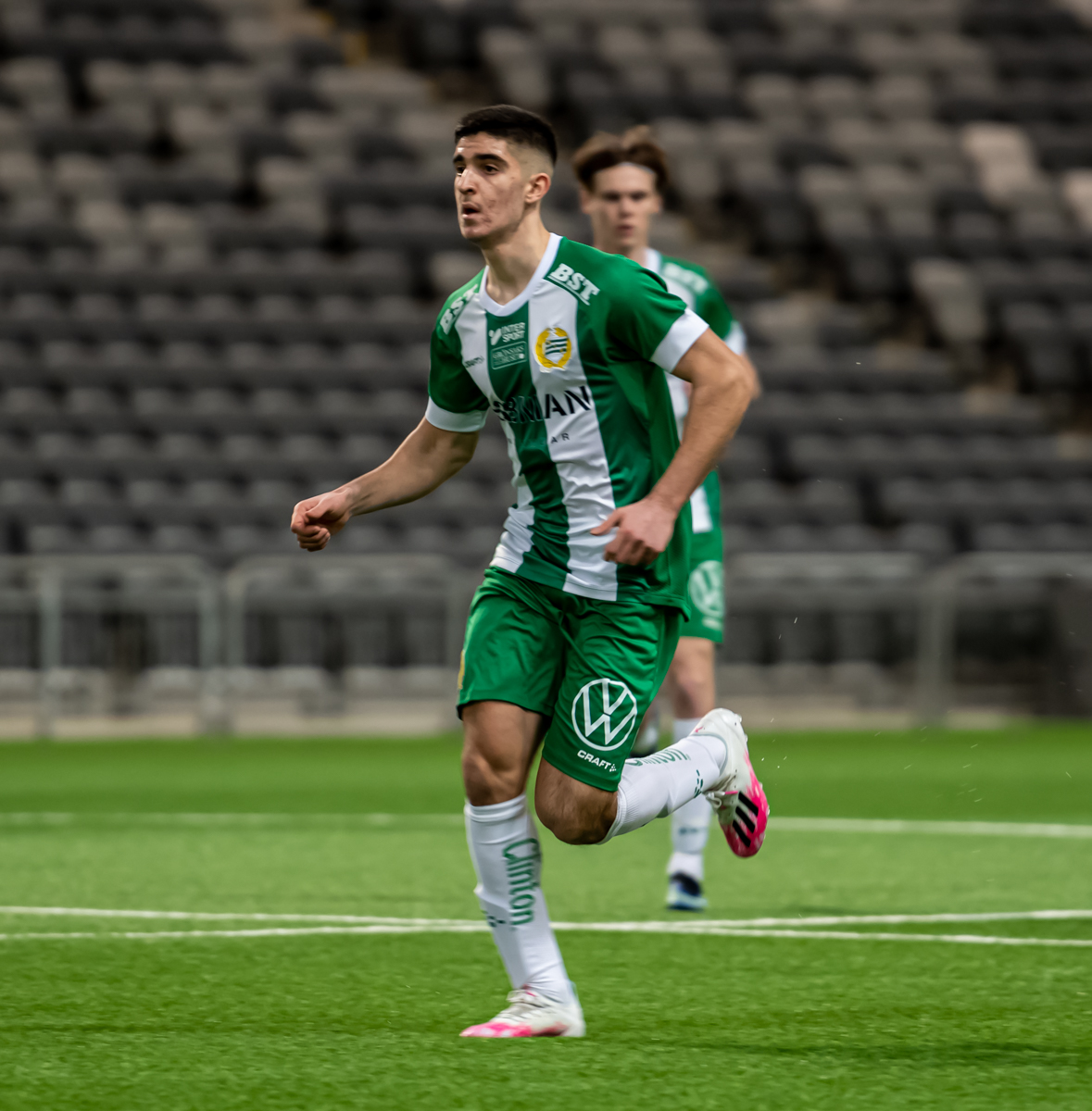
Lahdo with Hammarby IF in 2021

In 2020, Lahdo went on loan to Hammarby's affiliated club IK Frej in Division 1, Sweden's third tier. Aged 17, he played 21 games and scored five goals as the club finished 9th in the table.

On 11 January 2021, Lahdo signed his first senior contract with Hammarby, on a two-year deal. He made his competitive debut for the club on 20 February the same year, in a 4–1 home win against AFC Eskilstuna, in the group stage of the main domestic cup, Svenska Cupen. On 30 May 2021, Lahdo won the 2020–21 Svenska Cupen with Hammarby, through a 5–4 win on penalties (0–0 after full-time) against BK Häcken in the final.

=== AZ ===
On 17 June 2022, Lahdo transferred to Dutch club AZ in the Eredivisie, signing a contract until the summer of 2027. Having just six months left of his contract with Hammarby, the transfer fee was reportedly set at around €700,000.

==== Loans to Nantes and Brøndby ====
On 13 August 2025, Lahdo moved on loan to Nantes in France, with an option to buy. On 1 February 2026, Lahdo joined Brøndby in Denmark on loan with an option to buy.

=== Malmö ===
On 31 August 2026, Lahdo joined Allsvenskan side Malmö on a four-year deal.

== International career ==
In November 2022, Lahdo was called up to the Swedish under-21s for the first time, ahead of two friendlies. He scored both in his debut against Denmark in a 2–2 draw, and in a 8–1 win against Azerbaijan.

== Career statistics ==
=== Club ===
As of match played 19 September 2026

Appearances and goals by club, season and competition
Club	Season	League			National cup (Note: Includes Svenska Cupen, KNVB Cup, Coupe de France)		Continental		Other		Total	
Club	Season	Division	Apps	Goals	Apps	Goals	Apps	Goals	Apps	Goals	Apps	Goals
IK Frej (loan)	2020	Ettan	21	5	0	0	—		—		21	5
Hammarby TFF (loan)	2021	Ettan	15	3	0	0	—		—		15	3
Hammarby IF	2021	Allsvenskan	7	0	4	2	0	0	—		11	2
Hammarby IF	2022	Allsvenskan	10	1	3	1	—		—		13	2
Hammarby IF	Total		17	1	7	3	0	0	—		24	4
Jong AZ	2022–23	Eerste Divisie	6	1	—		—		—		6	1
AZ	2022–23	Eredivisie	25	2	1	0	15 (Note: Appearances in UEFA Europa Conference League)	3	—		41	5
AZ	2023–24	Eredivisie	15	3	0	0	6	2	—		21	5
AZ	2024–25	Eredivisie	21	3	3	0	10 (Note: Appearances in UEFA Europa League)	0	—		34	3
AZ	2026–27	Eredivisie	0	0	0	0	0	0	—		0	0
AZ	Total		61	8	4	0	31	5	—		96	13
Nantes (loan)	2025–26	Ligue 1	8	1	0	0	—		—		8	1
Brøndby (loan)	2025–26	Danish Superliga	9	1	—		—		1 (Note: Appearance in European play-offs)	0	10	1
Malmö	2026	Allsvenskan	2	0	0	0	—		—		2	0
Career total			139	20	11	3	31	5	1	0	182	27

== Honours ==
Hammarby IF

- Svenska Cupen: 2020–21
