= Dani de Wit =

Dutch footballer (born 1998)

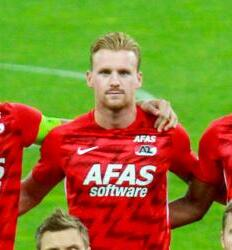
- de Wit in 2020 with AZ

Personal information
- Date of birth: 28 January 1998 (age 28)
- Place of birth: Hoorn, Netherlands
- Height: 1.84 m (6 ft 0 in)
- Position: Attacking midfielder

Team information
- Current team: FC Utrecht
- Number: 20

Youth career
- 2013–2019: Ajax

Senior career*
Years	Team	Apps	(Gls)
2016–2019	Jong Ajax	56	(19)
2018–2019	Ajax	5	(0)
2019–2024	AZ	125	(30)
2024–2025	VfL Bochum	28	(2)
2025–	FC Utrecht	36	(9)

International career
2015	Netherlands U17	6	(1)
2015–2016	Netherlands U18	7	(0)
2016–2017	Netherlands U19	15	(1)
2017–2018	Netherlands U20	11	(4)
2018–2021	Netherlands U21	15	(11)
- * Club domestic league appearances and goals as of 18 October 2026

Dani de Wit (born 28 January 1998) is a Dutch professional footballer who plays as an attacking midfielder for Eredivisie club FC Utrecht.

== Club career ==
=== Ajax ===
De Wit made his professional debut in the Eerste Divisie for Jong Ajax on 3 February 2017 in a game against RKC Waalwijk. On 25 February 2018, he made his debut in the senior squad in a 0–0 Eredivisie draw against ADO Den Haag. On 22 August 2018, he made his European debut in a 3–1 Champions League play-off win against Dynamo Kyiv.

=== AZ ===
On 30 August 2019, De Wit signed a contract with AZ Alkmaar who reportedly paid a €2 million transfer fee to Ajax.

=== Bochum ===
On 3 July 2024, De Wit signed a four-year contract with VfL Bochum as a free agent.

== Career statistics ==
=== Club ===
As of match played 18 October 2026

Appearances and goals by club, season and competition
Club	Season	League			National Cup (Note: Includes KNVB Cup)		Europe		Other		Total	
Club	Season	Division	Apps	Goals	Apps	Goals	Apps	Goals	Apps	Goals	Apps	Goals
Jong Ajax	2016–17	Eerste Divisie	4	0	—		—		—		4	0
Jong Ajax	2017–18	Eerste Divisie	33	13	—		—		—		33	13
Jong Ajax	2018–19	Eerste Divisie	18	6	—		—		—		18	6
Jong Ajax	2019–20	Eerste Divisie	1	0	—		—		—		1	0
Jong Ajax	Total		56	19	—		—		—		56	19
Ajax	2017–18	Eredivisie	1	0	0	0	0	0	—		1	0
Ajax	2018–19	Eredivisie	4	0	3	0	4 (Note: Appearance(s) in UEFA Champions League)	0	—		11	0
Ajax	2019–20	Eredivisie	0	0	0	0	2	0	0	0	2	0
Ajax	Total		5	0	3	0	6	0	0	0	14	0
AZ Alkmaar	2019–20	Eredivisie	22	3	3	2	8 (Note: Appearance(s) in UEFA Europa League)	0	—		33	5
AZ Alkmaar	2020–21	Eredivisie	20	4	0	0	7 (Note: Two appearances in UEFA Champions League, five appearances in UEFA Europa League)	1	—		27	5
AZ Alkmaar	2021–22	Eredivisie	33	8	4	1	10 (Note: Two appearances in UEFA Europa League, eight appearances in UEFA Conference League)	0	4 (Note: Appearance(s) in play-off)	2	51	11
AZ Alkmaar	2022–23	Eredivisie	18	5	1	1	13 (Note: Appearance(s) in UEFA Conference League)	7	—		32	13
AZ Alkmaar	2023–24	Eredivisie	32	10	3	1	10	1	—		45	12
AZ Alkmaar	Total		125	30	11	5	48	9	4	2	188	46
VfL Bochum	2024–25	Bundesliga	28	2	0	0	—		—		28	2
Utrecht	2025–26	Eredivisie	27	7	2	1	10	1	1 (Note: Appearance in European play-offs)	0	40	9
Utrecht	2026–27	Eredivisie	9	2	0	0	—		—		9	2
Utrecht	Total		36	9	2	1	10	1	1	0	49	11
Career total			249	60	16	6	64	10	5	2	335	78

== Honours ==
Jong Ajax

- Eerste Divisie: 2017–18

Ajax

- Eredivisie: 2018–19
- KNVB Cup: 2018–19

Individual

- UEFA European Under-21 Championship Team of the Tournament: 2021
