= Dirkshorn =

- Village
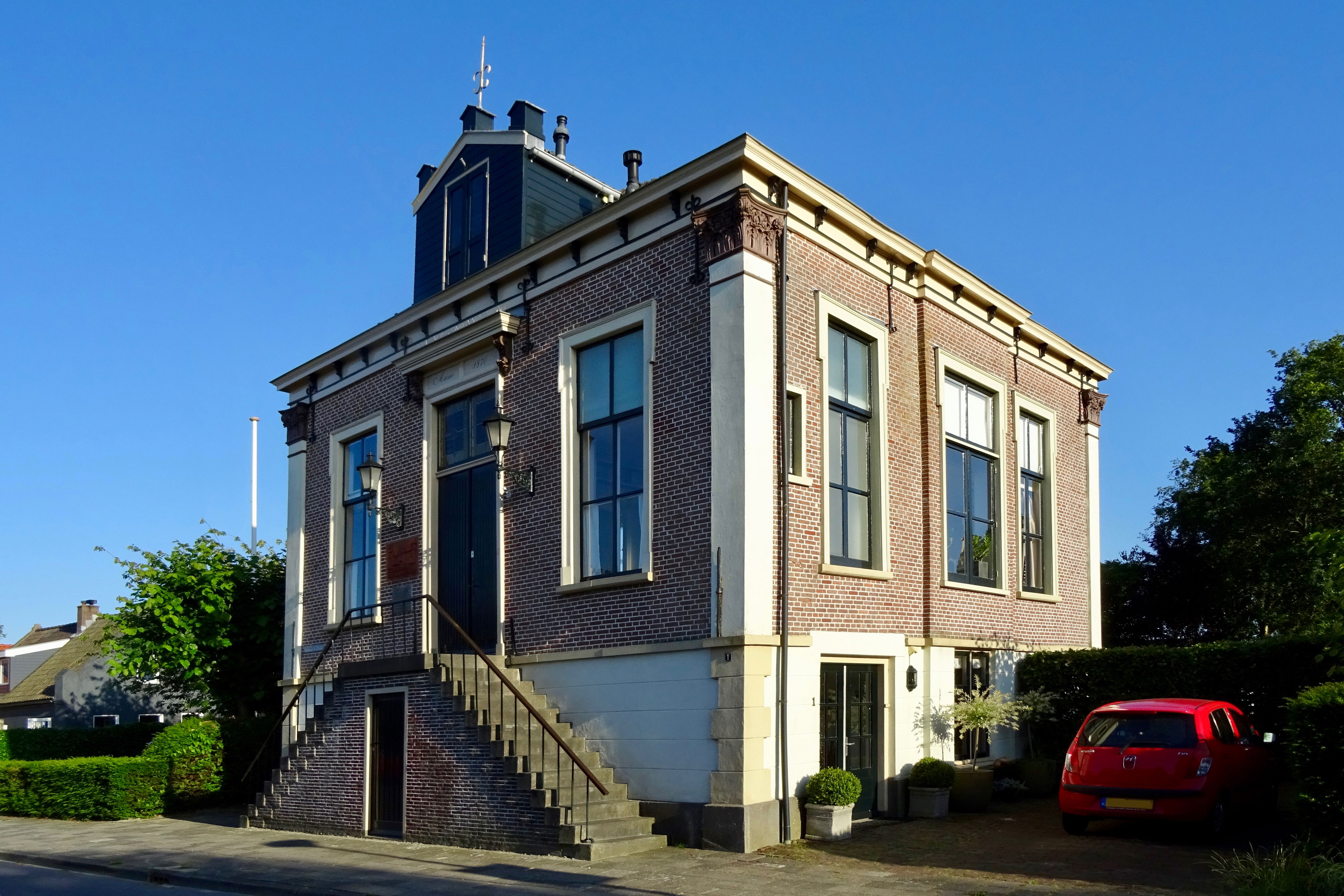
- Former town hall

- Location in the Netherlands Location in the province of North Holland in the Netherlands
- Coordinates: 52°45′N 4°47′E
- Country: Netherlands
- Province: North Holland
- Municipality: Schagen

Area
  - Village: 10.17 km^{2} (3.93 sq mi)
- Elevation: −0.4 m (−1.3 ft)

Population (2025)
  - Village: 1,675
  - Density: 164.7/km^{2} (426.6/sq mi)
  - Urban: 1,410
  - Rural: 270
- Time zone: UTC+1 (CET)
  - Summer (DST): UTC+2 (CEST)
- Postal code: 1746
- Dialing code: 0224

Dirkshorn (West Frisian: Durkshorn) is a town in the Dutch province of North Holland and the region of West-Frisia. It is a part of the municipality of Schagen, and lies about 9 km north of Heerhugowaard.

The village was first mentioned in 1573 as Dierickshorn, and means "corner of Dierick (person)". Dirkshorn is a dike village which developed in the Late Middle Ages.

The Dutch Reformed church is a Gothic Revival church which was built in 1868 to replace the 1659 church.

== Gallery ==
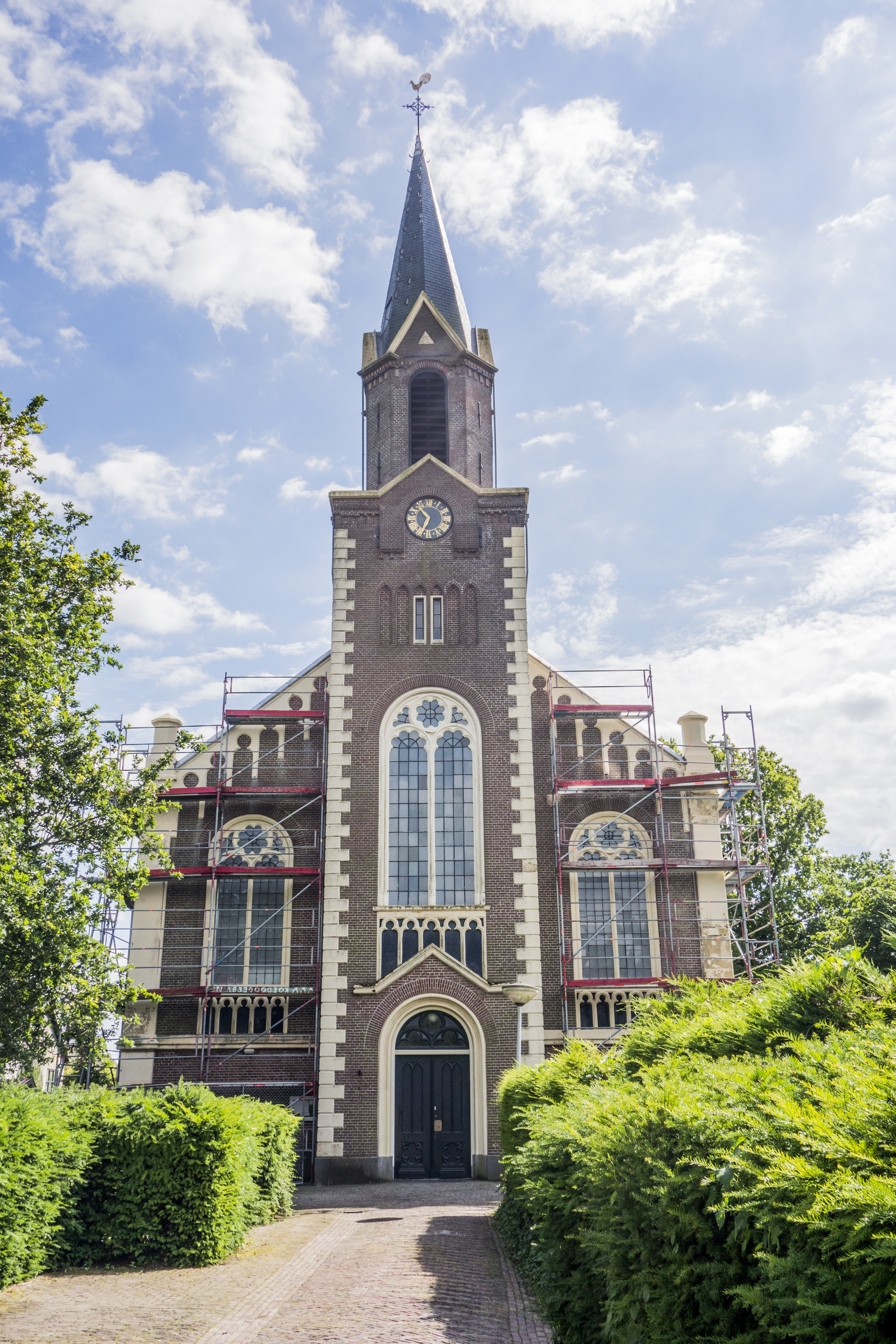
Dutch Reformed church

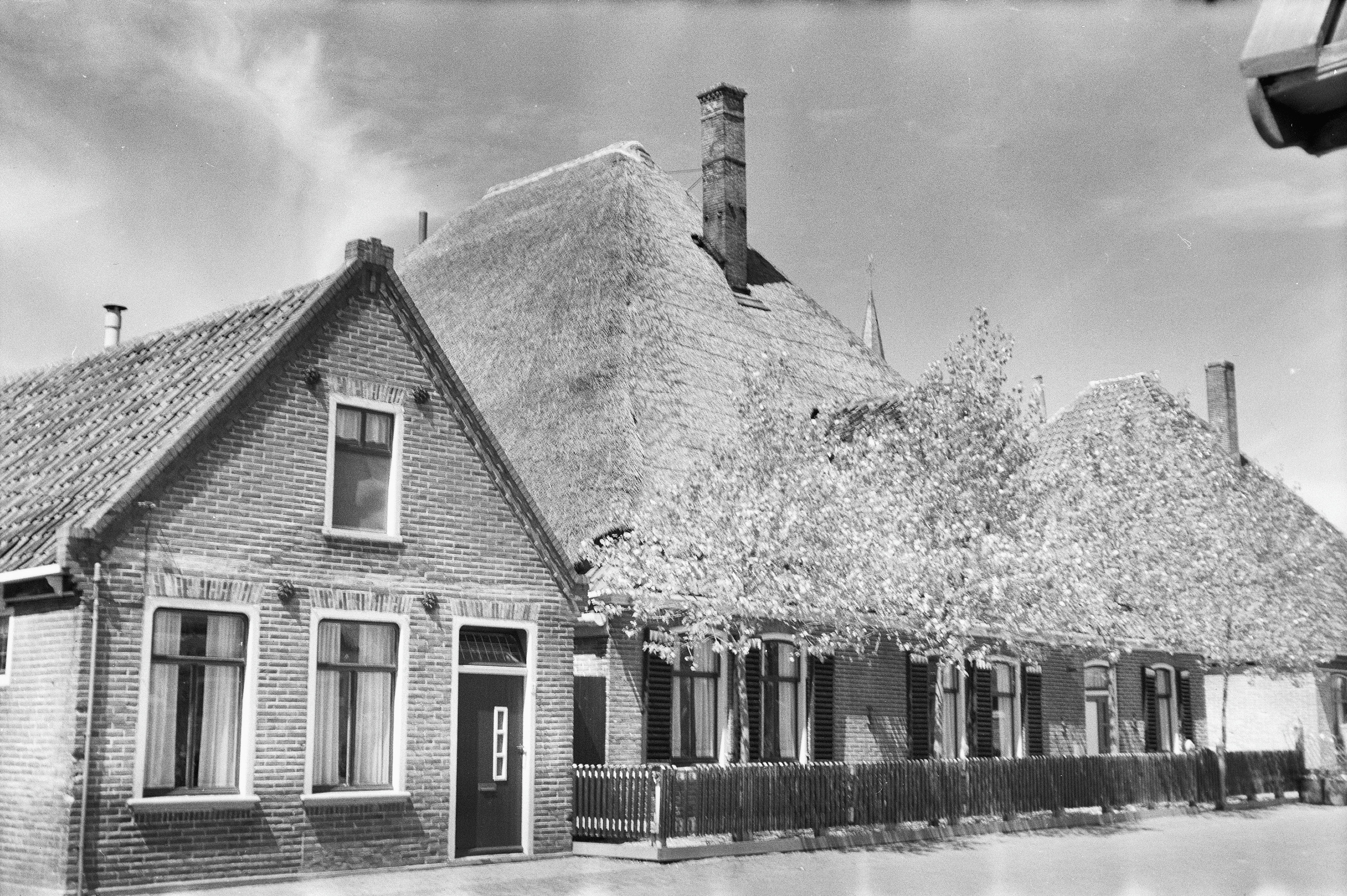
Farm in Dirkshorn
