= 2026 KNVB Cup final =

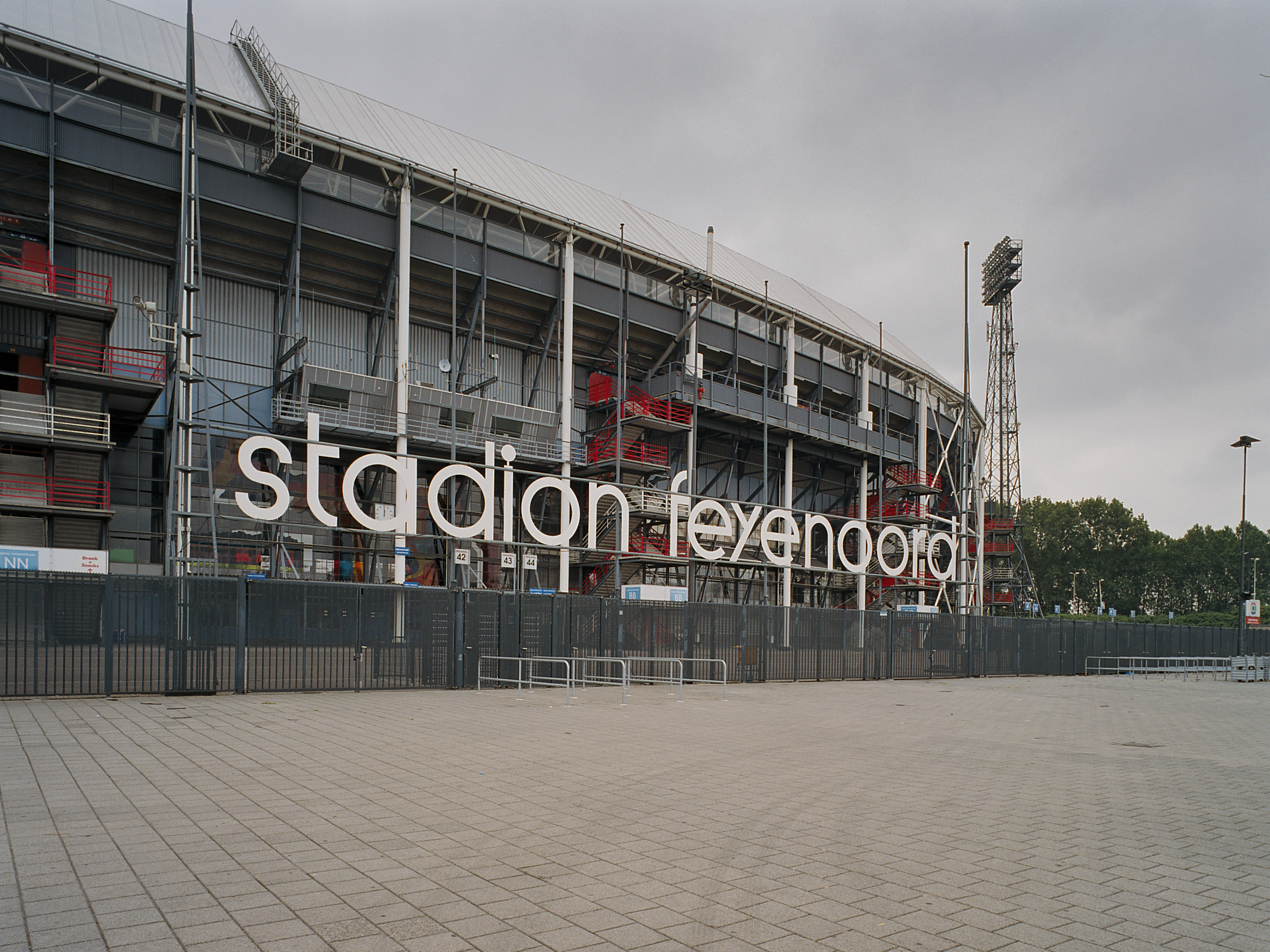
- De Kuip in Rotterdam hosted the final.
- Event: 2025–26 KNVB Cup
AZ	NEC
5	1
- Date: 19 April 2026
- Venue: De Kuip, Rotterdam
- Referee: Danny Makkelie
- Attendance: 46,500

The 2026 KNVB Cup final was the final match of the 2025–26 KNVB Cup, the 108th season of the annual Dutch national football cup competition. The match took place between AZ and NEC on 19 April 2026 at De Kuip, Rotterdam.

AZ defeated NEC 5–1 in the final and qualified for the 2026–27 UEFA Europa League and the Johan Cruyff Shield 2026 due to winning the KNVB Cup.

== Teams ==
Team	Previous final appearances (bold indicates winners)
AZ	8 (**1978**, **1981**, **1982**, 2007, **2013**, 2017, 2018, 2025)
NEC	5 (1973, 1983, 1994, 2000, 2024)

The final is contested by the losing teams of the two previous editions of the KNVB Cup final. AZ lost to Go Ahead Eagles on penalties a year prior and NEC lost the 2024 final 1–0 to Feyenoord. In total, AZ played in eight previous finals, winning four, whereas no club played as many finals without winning one as NEC, losing all their five previous finals.

== Route to the final ==
In all results below, the score of the finalist is given first (H: home; A: away).

AZ		Round	NEC	
Opponent	Result	2025–26 KNVB Cup	Opponent	Result
Bye		First round	Rijnsburgse Boys (III)	3–2 (A)
PEC Zwolle (I)	3–1 (A)	Second round	AFC (III)	3–1 (A)
Ajax (I)	6–0 (H)	Round of 16	De Treffers (III)	2–1 (A)
Twente (I)	2–1 (H) (a.e.t.)	Quarter-finals	Volendam (I)	1–0 (H)
Telstar (I)	2–1 (H)	Semi-finals	PSV (I)	3–2 (H)

== Match ==
19 April 2026
18:00 UTC+02:00

AZ	5–1	NEC
De Wit 32'; Mijnans 67'; Koopmeiners 73'; Smit 90+1'; Parrott 90+5'	Report	Ogawa 78'

De Kuip, Rotterdam
Attendance: 46,500
Referee: Danny Makkelie

GK	1	(Netherlands) Rome-Jayden Owusu-Oduro
RB	22	(Netherlands) Elijah Dijkstra
CB	3	(Netherlands) Wouter Goes
CB	5	(Portugal) Alexandre Penetra
LB	34	(Netherlands) Mees de Wit	(yellow card) 53'
CM	8	(Netherlands) Jordy Clasie	(yellow card) 8'	(substituted off) 69'
CM	26	(Netherlands) Kees Smit	(yellow card) 90+1'
CM	6	(Netherlands) Peer Koopmeiners		(substituted off) 86'
RW	10	(Netherlands) Sven Mijnans
ST	9	(Republic of Ireland) Troy Parrott	(yellow card) 90+5'
LW	27	(Netherlands) Ro-Zangelo Daal		(substituted off) 55'
Substitutes:
GK	12	(Netherlands) Hobie Verhulst
GK	41	(Netherlands) Jeroen Zoet
DF	2	(Japan) Seiya Maikuma
DF	15	(Mexico) Mateo Chávez
DF	18	(Japan) Rion Ichihara
DF	23	(Netherlands) Billy van Duijl		(substituted on) 69'
DF	30	(Netherlands) Denso Kasius		(substituted on) 86'
MF	20	(Netherlands) Kasper Boogaard
FW	7	(Brazil) Weslley Patati
FW	17	(Denmark) Isak Jensen		(substituted on) 55'
FW	24	(Netherlands) Ayoub Oufkir
FW	35	(Netherlands) Mexx Meerdink
FW	45	(Netherlands) Bendegúz Kovács
Manager:
(Netherlands) Lee-Roy Echteld

GK	22	(Netherlands) Jasper Cillessen
CB	14	(Israel) Eli Dasa
CB	3	(Netherlands) Philippe Sandler	(yellow card) 75'
CB	24	(Netherlands) Deveron Fonville		(substituted off) 74'
RM	25	(Netherlands) Sami Ouaissa	(yellow card) 10'
CM	23	(Japan) Kodai Sano		(substituted off) 74'
CM	6	(Croatia) Darko Nejašmić
LM	11	(Turkey) Başar Önal		(substituted off) 46'
AM	10	(Suriname) Tjaronn Chery
AM	20	(France) Noé Lebreton	(yellow card) 90+4'
ST	30	(Netherlands) Bryan Linssen		(substituted off) 74'
Substitutes:
GK	1	(Argentina) Gonzalo Crettaz
DF	2	(France) Brayann Pereira
DF	4	(Turkey) Ahmetcan Kaplan
DF	5	(Netherlands) Thomas Ouwejan
DF	15	(Netherlands) Jetro Willems
DF	17	(Netherlands) Bram Nuytinck
MF	19	(Iceland) Willum Þór Willumsson		(substituted on) 46'
MF	71	(Netherlands) Dirk Proper
FW	7	(Netherlands) Virgil Misidjan
FW	9	(Brazil) Danilo		(substituted on) 74'
FW	18	(Japan) Koki Ogawa		(substituted on) 74'
FW	34	(Morocco) Youssef El Kachati		(substituted on) 74'
Manager:
(Netherlands) Dick Schreuder

Assistant referees:
Hessel Steegstra
Jan de Vries
Fourth official:
Allard Lindhout
Video assistant referee:
Rob Dieperink
Assistant video assistant referee:
Robin Hensgens

**Match rules**

- 90 minutes
- 30 minutes of extra time if necessary
- Penalty shoot-out if scores still level
- Maximum of twelve named substitutes
- Maximum of five substitutions
- Maximum of three substitution opportunities
