= 2025 KNVB Cup final =

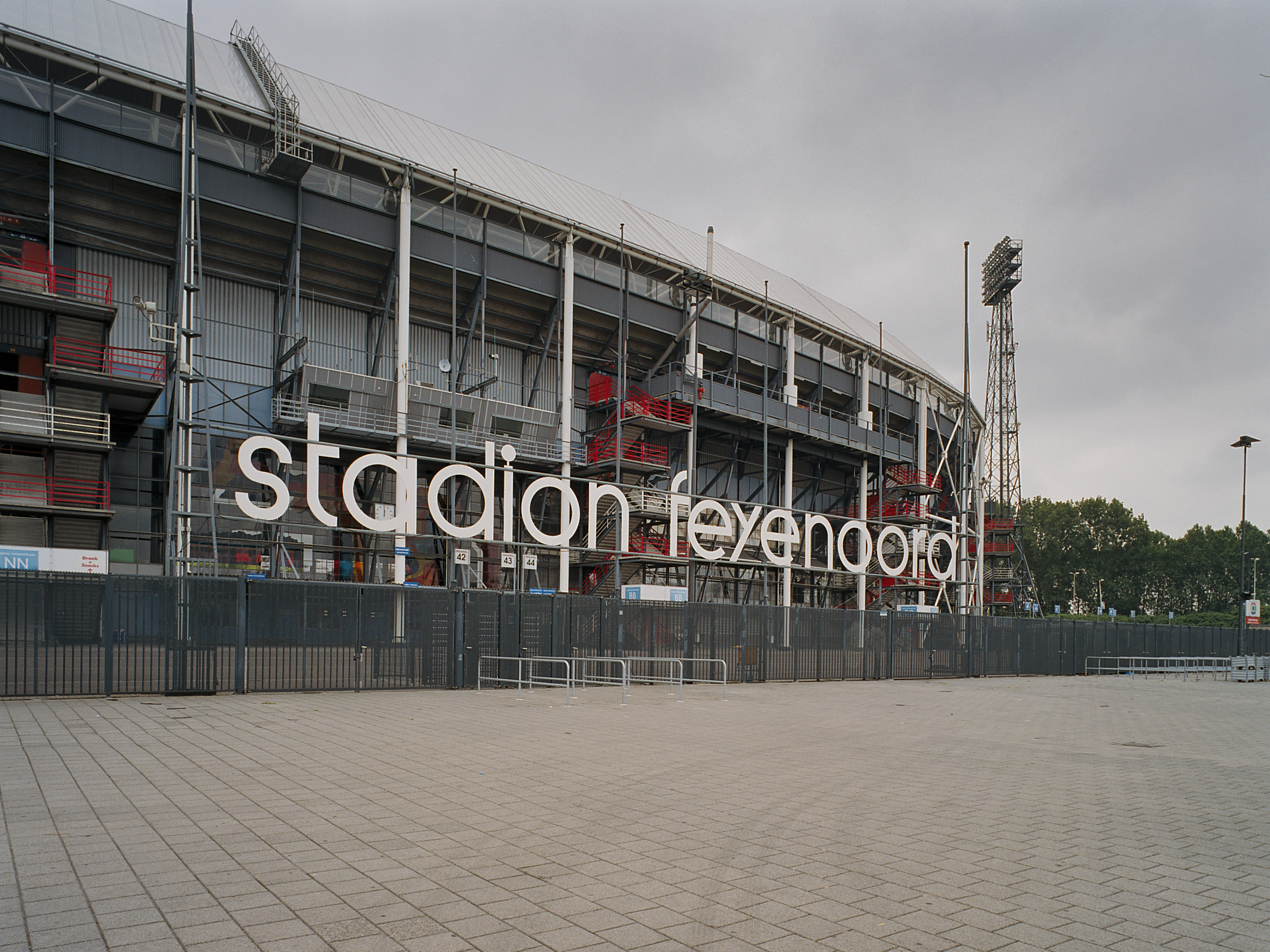
- De Kuip in Rotterdam hosted the final.
- Event: 2024–25 KNVB Cup
AZ	Go Ahead Eagles
1	1
- After extra time Go Ahead Eagles won 4–2 on penalties
- Date: 21 April 2025
- Venue: De Kuip, Rotterdam
- Referee: Danny Makkelie
- Attendance: 42,972

The 2025 KNVB Cup final was a football match between Eredivisie clubs AZ and Go Ahead Eagles, which took place on 21 April 2025 at De Kuip, Rotterdam, and was won by Go Ahead Eagles. It was the final match of the 2024–25 KNVB Cup, the 107th season of the annual Dutch national football cup competition.

Go Ahead Eagles won the final on penalties and qualified for the 2025–26 UEFA Europa League league stage and the Johan Cruyff Shield 2025 due to winning the KNVB Cup.

== Route to the final ==
AZ		Round	Go Ahead Eagles	
Opponent	Result		Opponent	Result
Bye		First round	Bye	
Groningen	3–1 (H)	Second round	Sparta Rotterdam	1–1 (5–4 pen.) (A)
Ajax	2–0 (H)	Round of 16	Twente	3–1 (H)
Quick Boys	3–1 (H)	Quarter-finals	Noordwijk	3–1 (H)
Heracles Almelo	2–2 (4–3 pen.) (A)	Semi-finals	PSV	2–1 (A)

== Match ==
21 April 2025
18:00 UTC+02:00

AZ	1–1 (a.e.t.)	Go Ahead Eagles
Parrott 54' (pen.)	Report	Deijl 90+9' (pen.)
Penalties
Meerdink (penalty scored); Koopmeiners (penalty scored); Buurmeester (penalty missed); Lahdo (penalty missed)	2–4	(penalty scored) Deijl; (penalty scored) Tengstedt; (penalty scored) Smit; (penalty scored) Dirksen

De Kuip, Rotterdam
Attendance: 42,972
Referee: Danny Makkelie

AZ	Go Ahead Eagles

GK	1	(Netherlands) Rome-Jayden Owusu-Oduro
LB	18	(Norway) David Møller Wolfe
CB	4	(Netherlands) Bruno Martins Indi	(c)	(substituted off) 88'
CB	3	(Netherlands) Wouter Goes	(yellow card) 89'
RB	16	(Japan) Seiya Maikuma	(substituted off) 94'
CDM	26	(Netherlands) Kees Smit	(substituted off) 89'
CDM	6	(Netherlands) Peer Koopmeiners
LM	7	(Netherlands) Ruben van Bommel	(substituted off) 81'
AM	10	(Netherlands) Sven Mijnans
RM	21	(Netherlands) Ernest Poku	(yellow card) 62'	(substituted off) 81'
ST	9	(Republic of Ireland) Troy Parrott	(substituted off) 60'
Substitutes:
GK	12	(Netherlands) Hobie Verhulst
GK	41	(Netherlands) Jeroen Zoet
DF	22	(Netherlands) Maxim Dekker	(substituted on) 88'
DF	30	(Netherlands) Denso Kasius	(substituted on) 94'
DF	34	(Netherlands) Mees de Wit
MF	28	(Netherlands) Zico Buurmeester	(substituted on) 89'
MF	24	(Netherlands) Lewis Schouten
MF	67	(Netherlands) Kasper Boogaard
FW	11	(Ghana) Ibrahim Sadiq	(substituted on) 81'
FW	23	(Sweden) Mayckel Lahdo	(substituted on) 81'
FW	35	(Netherlands) Mexx Meerdink	(substituted on) 60'
FW	17	(Netherlands) Jayden Addai
Manager:
(Belgium) Maarten Martens

GK	22	(Belgium) Jari De Busser
LB	29	(Denmark) Aske Adelgaard	(substituted off) 80'
CB	4	(Netherlands) Joris Kramer	(yellow card) 84'
CB	3	(Germany) Gerrit Nauber	(substituted off) 120+1'
RB	2	(Netherlands) Mats Deijl	(c)
CDM	8	(Netherlands) Evert Linthorst	(substituted off) 80'
CDM	21	(Netherlands) Enric Llansana	(yellow card) 95'
LM	17	(Belgium) Mathis Suray	(substituted off) 89'
AM	16	(Sweden) Victor Edvardsen	(yellow card) 90+9'
RM	19	(Finland) Oliver Antman	(substituted off) 94'
ST	9	(Netherlands) Milan Smit
Substitutes:
GK	1	(Germany) Luca Plogmann
GK	30	(Netherlands) Sven Jansen
GK	33	(Netherlands) Nando Verdoni
DF	26	(Netherlands) Julius Dirksen	(substituted on) 120+1'
DF	24	(Netherlands) Luca Everink
MF	6	(Netherlands) Calvin Twigt	(substituted on) 94'
MF	15	(Netherlands) Robbin Weijenberg	(substituted on) 90'
FW	10	(Denmark) Søren Tengstedt	(substituted on) 80'
FW	14	(Sweden) Oscar Pettersson	(substituted on) 89'
FW	27	(Netherlands) Finn Stokkers	(substituted on) 80'	(substituted off) 90'
FW	11	(Norway) Oskar Sivertsen
FW	31	(Netherlands) Ofosu Boakye
Manager:
(Netherlands) Paul Simonis

Match rules

- 90 minutes.
- 30 minutes of extra time if necessary.
- Penalty shoot-out if scores still level.
- Maximum of twelve named substitutes.
- Maximum of five substitutions, with a sixth allowed in extra time. (Note: Each team will only be given three opportunities to make substitutions, with a fourth opportunity in extra time, excluding substitutions made at half-time, before the start of extra time and at half-time in extra time.)
