= 2025–26 AZ Alkmaar season =

AZ Alkmaar
2025–26 season
- President: René Neelissen
- General manager: Robert Eenhoorn
- Head coach: Maarten Martens
- Stadium: AFAS Stadion
- Eredivisie: 7th
- KNVB Cup: Winners
- UEFA Conference League: Quarter-finals
- Top goalscorer: League: Troy Parrott (16); All: Troy Parrott (31)
- Highest home attendance: 17,935 vs Groningen, 10 August 2025, Eredivisie
- Lowest home attendance: 11,476 vs Vaduz, 7 August 2025, UEFA Conference League
- Average home league attendance: 14,705
- Biggest win: 6–0 (H)
- Biggest defeat: 1–5 (H)
Home colours	Away colours	Third colours

The 2025–26 season was the 59th season in the history of AZ Alkmaar, and the club's 28th consecutive season in the Eredivisie. In addition to the domestic league, the club participated in the KNVB Cup and UEFA Conference League, winning the former competition.

== Players ==
=== First-team squad ===
As of 4 February 2026

Note: Flags indicate national team as defined under FIFA eligibility rules; some limited exceptions apply. Players may hold more than one non-FIFA nationality.

No.	Pos.	Nation	Player
1	GK	NED	Rome-Jayden Owusu-Oduro
2	DF	JPN	Seiya Maikuma
3	DF	NED	Wouter Goes
4	DF	NED	Maxim Dekker
5	DF	POR	Alexandre Penetra
6	MF	NED	Peer Koopmeiners
7	FW	BRA	Weslley Patati
8	MF	NED	Jordy Clasie (captain)
9	FW	IRL	Troy Parrott
10	MF	NED	Sven Mijnans
11	FW	GHA	Ibrahim Sadiq
12	GK	NED	Hobie Verhulst
14	DF	ITA	Andrea Natali (on loan from Bayer Leverkusen)
15	DF	MEX	Mateo Chávez
17	FW	DEN	Isak Jensen

No.	Pos.	Nation	Player
18	DF	JPN	Rion Ichihara
19	FW	NED	Jizz Hornkamp
20	MF	NED	Kasper Boogaard
22	DF	NED	Elijah Dijkstra
23	DF	NED	Billy van Duijl
24	FW	NED	Ayoub Oufkir
26	MF	NED	Kees Smit
27	FW	NED	Ro-Zangelo Daal
30	DF	NED	Denso Kasius
31	GK	NED	Daniël Deen
33	MF	CZE	Matěj Šín
34	DF	NED	Mees de Wit
35	FW	NED	Mexx Meerdink
41	GK	NED	Jeroen Zoet

=== Out on loan ===
Note: Flags indicate national team as defined under FIFA eligibility rules; some limited exceptions apply. Players may hold more than one non-FIFA nationality.

No.	Pos.	Nation	Player
—	GK	NED	Sem Westerveld (at MVV Maastricht until 30 June 2026)
—	DF	NED	Finn Stam (at Willem II until 30 June 2026)
—	MF	SRB	Kristijan Belić (at Maccabi Tel Aviv until 30 June 2026)
—	MF	NED	Zico Buurmeester (at PEC Zwolle until 30 June 2026)
—	MF	NED	Dave Kwakman (at Volendam until 30 June 2026)

No.	Pos.	Nation	Player
—	MF	NED	Lewis Schouten (at Excelsior until 30 June 2026)
—	FW	NED	Sem van Duijn (at Telstar until 30 June 2026)
—	FW	SWE	Mayckel Lahdo (at Brøndby until 30 June 2026)
—	FW	NED	Lequincio Zeefuik (at Heracles until 30 June 2026)

== Transfers ==
=== In ===
Pos.	Player	Transferred from	Fee	Date	Source
DF	(Netherlands) Elijah Dijkstra	Jong AZ		1 July 2025	
DF	(Mexico) Mateo Chávez	(Mexico) Guadalajara	€2,000,000	1 July 2025	
MF	(Denmark) Isak Jensen	(Denmark) Viborg	€4,000,000	15 July 2025	
MF	(Netherlands) Billy van Duijl	Jong AZ		4 August 2025	

=== Out ===
Pos.	Player	Transferred to	Fee	Date	Source
DF	(Netherlands) Lewis Schouten	(Netherlands) Excelsior	Loan	1 July 2025	
GK	(Netherlands) Sem Westerveld	(Netherlands) MVV Maastricht	Loan	2 July 2025	
MF	(Netherlands) Jayden Addai	(Italy) Como	€14,000,000	4 July 2025	
FW	(Netherlands) Ruben van Bommel	(Netherlands) PSV	€15,800,000	11 July 2025	
DF	(Netherlands) Bruno Martins Indi	(Netherlands) Sparta Rotterdam	Loan	15 July 2025	
DF	(Norway) David Møller Wolfe	(England) Wolverhampton Wanderers	€12,000,000	2 August 2025	
MF	(Serbia) Kristijan Belić	(Israel) Maccabi Tel Aviv	Loan	10 August 2025	
FW	(Netherlands) Ernest Poku	(Germany) Bayer Leverkusen	€10,000,000	12 August 2025	

== Pre-season and friendlies ==
5 July 2025 Friendly	AZ (Netherlands)	0–1	(Belgium) Zulte Waregem	Dirkshorn, Netherlands
16:30		Report	Opoku 64'	Stadium: Sportpark V.V. Dirkshorn; Referee: Martin van den Kerkhof

9 July 2025 Friendly	AZ (Netherlands)	3–2	(Greece) Aris	Epe, Netherlands
17:00	Daal 49'; Koopmeiners 61'; Lahdo 65'	Report	Fadiga 13'; Rose 73'	Stadium: Sportpark Ericaweg

12 July 2025 Friendly	AZ	3–2	Almere City	Epe, Netherlands
13:00	Daal 27'; Smit 31', 34'	Report	Dijkstra 105' (o.g.); Bais 112'	Stadium: Sportpark Ericaweg
Note: AZ replaced all their outfield players after the 60th minute, and as such the match was considered to be played in two halves. Therefore, 105' refers to 45 minutes into the second half of the match

16 July 2025 Friendly	Gent (Belgium)	1–2	(Netherlands) AZ	Gent, Belgium
19:00	Smit 15'; Samoise 6'	Report	Chávez 100'; Smit 15'	Stadium: Planet Group Arena
Note: This was a 120-minute match, with 90 minutes of normal time and 30 minutes of extra time

19 July 2025 Friendly	AZ (Netherlands)	2–1	(Croatia) Lokomotiva	Dirkshorn, Netherlands
16:30	Dijkstra 30'; Kasius 85'	Report	Vuković 28'	Stadium: Sportpark V.V. Dirkshorn

3 August 2025 Friendly	AZ (Netherlands)	2–2	(Greece) OFI Crete	Dirkshorn, Netherlands
15:00	Meerdink 57'; Mijnans 81'	Report	Theodosoulakis 4'; Shengelia 21'	Stadium: Sportpark V.V. Dirkshorn

== Competitions ==
=== Overall record ===
Competition	First match	Last match	Starting round	Final position	Record							
Competition	First match	Last match	Starting round	Final position	Pld	W	D	L	GF	GA	GD	Win %
Eredivisie	10 August 2025	17 May 2026	Matchday 1	7th	34	14	10	10	58	51	+7	41.18
KNVB Cup	3 December 2025	19 April 2026	Second round	Winners	5	5	0	0	18	4	+14	100.00
UEFA Conference League	24 July 2025	16 April 2026	Second qualifying round	Quarter-finals	18	11	2	5	37	19	+18	61.11
Total					57	30	12	15	113	74	+39	52.63

Source: Soccerway

=== Eredivisie ===
==== League table ====
Pos	Team	Pld	W	D	L	GF	GA	GD	Pts	Qualification or relegation
5	Ajax (O)	34	14	14	6	62	41	+21	56	Qualification for the European competition play-offs
6	Utrecht	34	15	8	11	55	42	+13	53	Qualification for the European competition play-offs
7	AZ	34	14	10	10	58	51	+7	52	Qualification for the Europa League league phase (Note: Qualified for the Europa League league phase as the 2025–26 KNVB Cup winners.)
8	Heerenveen	34	14	9	11	57	53	+4	51	Qualification for the European competition play-offs
9	Groningen	34	14	6	14	49	45	+4	48	Qualification for the European competition play-offs

Source: Eredivisie
Rules for classification: At end of season: 1) Points; 2) Goal difference; 3) Goals scored; 4) Head-to-head points; 5) Head-to-head goal difference; 6) Head-to-head goals scored; 7) Head-to-head away goals scored; 8) Play-off match or matches; 9) Penalty shoot-out (if the play-off match or matches end in a draw)
(O) Play-off winners

==== Results summary ====
Overall								Home						Away					
Pld	W	D	L	GF	GA	GD	Pts	W	D	L	GF	GA	GD	W	D	L	GF	GA	GD
34	14	10	10	58	51	+7	52	8	7	2	39	26	+13	6	3	8	19	25	−6

Source: Eredivisie

==== Results by round ====
Round	1	2	3	4	5	6	7	8	9	10	11	12	13	14	15	16	17	18	19	20	21	22	23	24	25	26	27	28	29	30	31	32	33	34
Ground	H	A	A	A	H	H	A	H	A	H	A	H	A	A	H	H	A	H	A	A	H	H	A	H	A	A	H	A	H	H	A	H	A	H
Result	W	D	W	W	D	D	L	W	W	W	W	L	L	L	D	D	L	W	L	W	L	D	W	W	L	L	W	L	W	W	D	D	D	D
Position	4	5	6	4	4	5	5	4	3	3	3	3	3	4	5	5	6	5	7	5	6	7	6	5	6	6	6	6	6	6	6	6	6	7

Source: Eredivisie
A = Away; H = Home; W = Win; D = Draw; L = Loss

==== Matches ====
The full schedule was released on 18 June 2025.

Win Draw Loss Fixtures

10 August 2025 1	AZ	4–1	Groningen	Alkmaar
14:30 CEST (UTC+2)	Kasius 5'; Parrott 18', 87'; Resink 32' (o.g.); De Wit (yellow card) 35'; Smit (yellow card) 45+2'	Report	Rente 44'; De Jong (yellow card) 47'; Peersman (yellow card) 61'	Stadium: AFAS Stadion; Attendance: 17,935; Referee: Serdar Gözübüyük

17 August 2025 2	Volendam	2–2	AZ	Volendam
16:45 CEST (UTC+2)	Oehlers 7'; Bukala (yellow card) 13'; Mbuyamba 65'	Report	Sadiq 16'; De Wit (yellow card) 53'; Parrott 54', (yellow card) 85'; Buurmeester (yellow card) 89'	Stadium: Kras Stadion; Attendance: 6,376; Referee: Martijn Vos

31 August 2025 4	NAC Breda	0–1	AZ	Breda
16:45 CEST (UTC+2)	Van Hooijdonk (red card) 41'; Brym (penalty missed) 56'	Report	De Wit (yellow card) 35'; Sadiq (yellow card) 55'; Penetra (yellow card) 69'; Smit (yellow card) 83'; Mijnans 89', (yellow card) 90+4'	Stadium: Rat Verlegh Stadion; Attendance: 20,215; Referee: Jeroen Manschot

14 September 2025 5	Heracles	1–2	AZ	Almelo
14:30 CEST (UTC+2)	Mirani 29'; Hrustic (yellow card) 74'	Report	Penetra 9', (yellow card) 11'; Kasius (yellow card) 28'; De Wit (yellow card) 61'; Clasie (yellow card) 64'; Meerdink 77'; Zeefuik (yellow card) 90+1'	Stadium: Asito Stadion; Attendance: 11,694; Referee: Bas Nijhuis

21 September 2025 6	AZ	3–3	Feyenoord	Alkmaar
16:45 CEST (UTC+2)	Clasie (yellow card) 23'; Daal 24'; Sadiq (yellow card) 38'; Penetra (yellow card) 46'; Kassius 51'; Goes (yellow card) 61'; Meerdink 90+8' (pen.)	Report	Steijn 36' (pen.); Bos 56'; Ahmedhodžić (yellow card) 70' (yellow-red card) 90'; Slory (yellow card) 71'; Hadj Moussa 78'; Wellenreuther (yellow card) 90'; Nieuwkoop (yellow card) 90+4'	Stadium: AFAS Stadion; Attendance: 18,351; Referee: Danny Makkelie

24 September 2025 3	AZ	2–2	PEC Zwolle	Alkmaar
21:00 CEST (UTC+2)	Smit 38', (yellow card) 45+1'; Patati 45+3'	Report	Aertssen (yellow card) 29'; Kostons 44', 47'; Gooijer (yellow card) 82'	Stadium: AFAS Stadion; Attendance: 17,322; Referee: Marc Nagtegaal
Note: Fixture was initially scheduled for 24 August.

28 September 2025 7	NEC	2–1	AZ	Nijmegen
12:15 CEST (UTC+2)	Önal 26'; Kaplan (yellow card) 71'; Proper 79'	Report	De Wit (yellow card) 12'; Goes (yellow card) 29'; Koopmeiners (yellow card) 44'; Meerdink (yellow card) 51'; Sadiq 60'; Clasie (yellow card) 69' (yellow-red card) 85'	Stadium: Goffertstadion; Attendance: 12,650; Referee: Sander van der Eijk

5 October 2025 8	AZ	2–1	Telstar	Alkmaar
15:30 CEST (UTC+2)	Meerdink 15' (pen.); Sin 45+2', (yellow card) 52'; Goes (yellow card) 64'; Kasius (yellow card) 73'	Report	Ogidi Nwankwo (yellow card) 14'; Noslin 61'; Van de Kamp (yellow card) 90'	Stadium: AFAS Stadion; Attendance: 18,849; Referee: Serdar Gözübüyük

18 October 2025 9	Ajax	0–2	AZ	Amsterdam
21:00 CEST (UTC+2)	Gaaei (yellow card) 52'; Klaassen (yellow card) 59'; Baas (yellow card) 72'; Weghorst (yellow card) 89'	Report	De Wit (yellow card) 21'; Patati 25'; Parrott 42' (pen.); Koopmeiners (yellow card) 83'	Stadium: Johan Cruyff Arena; Attendance: 54,274; Referee: Jeroen Manschot

26 October 2025 10	AZ	4–1	Utrecht	Alkmaar
16:45 CET (UTC+1)	Parrott 6', 34', (penalty missed) 60'; De Wit 41'; Mijnans 51'	Report	Blake (yellow card) 27'; Zechiël 69'	Stadium: AFAS Stadion; Attendance: 18,909; Referee: Bas Nijhuis

2 November 2025 11	Sparta Rotterdam	0–1	AZ	Rotterdam
14:30 CET (UTC+1)	Lauritsen (yellow card) 79'	Report	Parrot (penalty missed) 28'; Smit 69'; Goes (yellow card) 79'	Stadium: Sparta Stadion Het Kasteel; Attendance: 10,290; Referee: Danny Makkelie

9 November 2025 12	AZ	1–5	PSV	Alkmaar
14:30 CET (UTC+1)	Bogaard (yellow card) 1'; Mijnans 34'; Goes (yellow card) 44'	Report	Mauro Júnior 5'; Til 11', 28', 89'; Salah-Eddine (yellow card) 17'; Veerman 62'	Stadium: AFAS Stadion; Attendance: 19,011; Referee: Serdar Gözübüyük

23 November 2025 13	Heerenveen	3–1	AZ	Heerenveen
12:15 CET (UTC+1)	Vente 38'; Van Overeem 40'; Kersten (yellow card) 54'; Brouwers 79'	Report	Parrott 75'	Stadium: Abe Lenstra Stadion; Attendance: 21,285; Referee: Allard Lindhout

30 November 2025 14	Twente	1–0	AZ	Twente
16:45 CET (UTC+1)	Van Wolfswinkel (yellow card) 69'; Rots 75'; Peixoto (yellow card) 85'	Report	Goes (yellow card) 48'; Parrott (yellow card) 49', (penalty missed) 90+9'; Smit (yellow card) 62'; Chávez (yellow card) 90+2'	Stadium: De Grolsch Veste; Attendance: 29,700; Referee: Jeroen Manschot

7 December 2025 15	AZ	2–2	Go Ahead Eagles	Alkmaar
14:30 CET (UTC+1)	Parrott 31'; Deijl 40' (o.g.); Chávez (yellow card) 42'; Goes (yellow card) 64'	Report	Meulensteen 10', 80'; James (yellow card) 61'	Stadium: AFAS Stadion; Referee: Erwin Blank

21 December 2025 17	Fortuna Sittard	4–3	AZ	Sittard
16:45 CET (UTC+1)	Lonwijk 9'; Sierhuis (yellow card) 37', (goal) 42', 54'; Brittijn (yellow card) 40', (goal) 86'; Adewoye (yellow card) 45+1'	Report	Parrott 19'; Mijnans 21'; De Wit 71'	Stadium: Fortuna Sittard Stadion; Attendance: 10,440; Referee: Marc Nagtegaal

10 January 2026 18	AZ	1–0	Volendam	Alkmaar
16:30 CET (UTC+1)	Mijnans 9'	Report	Van Cruijsen (yellow card) 45+2'	Stadium: AFAS Stadion; Attendance: 18,202; Referee: Allard Lindhout

17 January 2026 19	PEC Zwolle	3–1	AZ	Zwolle
18:45 CET (UTC+1)	Shoretire 7', 90+4', (yellow card) 90+5'; García MacNulty 26'	Report	Penetra (yellow card) 23'; Chávez (yellow card) 55'; Koopmeiners 74'	Stadium: MAC3PARK Stadion; Attendance: 13,745; Referee: Dennis Higler

21 January 2026 16	AZ	1–1	Excelsior	Alkmaar
17:45 CET (UTC+1)	Parrott 65'; Dijkstra (yellow card) 77'; Chávez (yellow card) 86'; Koopmeiners (yellow card) 90+3'	Report	De Regt (yellow card) 67'; Jonathans 81'	Stadium: AFAS Stadion; Attendance: 16,997; Referee: Alex Bos

25 January 2026 20	Telstar	0–1	AZ	Velsen
12:15 CET (UTC+1)	Tejan (yellow card) 80'	Report	Koopmeiners (yellow card) 26'; Goes (yellow card) 54'; Jensen 78'	Stadium: BUKO Stadion; Attendance: 5,293; Referee: Robin Hensgens

31 January 2026 21	AZ	1–3	NEC	Alkmaar
15:30 CET (UTC+1)	Parrott 40'; De Wit (yellow card) 71'	Report	Lebreton (yellow card) 6'; Chery 10'; Önal 12'; Sano 52'; Sano (yellow card) 77'	Stadium: AFAS Stadion; Attendance: 19,391; Referee: Serdar Gözubuyuk

8 February 2026 22	AZ	1–1	Ajax	Alkmaar
13:30 CET (UTC+1)	Goes 52'; Koopmeiners (yellow card) 55'; De Wit (yellow card) 59'; Sadiq (yellow card) 90+5'	Report	Fitz-Jim 90+3'	Stadium: AFAS Stadion; Attendance: 18,736; Referee: Danny Makkelie

14 February 2026 23	Excelsior	1–2	AZ	Rotterdam
17:45 CET (UTC+1)	Bronkhorst (yellow card) 20', (goal) 45+1'	Report	Chávez (yellow card) 29'; Robbemond (yellow card) 70'; Parrott 90+2'; Penetra 90+6'	Stadium: Stadion Woudestein; Attendance: 4,600; Referee: Erwin Blank

22 February 2026 24	AZ	3–1	Sparta Rotterdam	Alkmaar
16:45 CET (UTC+1)	Goes (yellow card) 31'; Mijnans 65'; Smit 83'; Parrott 90', (yellow card) 90+1'	Report	Clement (yellow card) 34'; Young (yellow card) 79'; Zonneveld 87'	Stadium: AFAS Stadion; Attendance: 17,776; Referee: Allard Lindhout

1 March 2026 25	Utrecht	2–0	AZ	Utrecht
16:45 CET (UTC+1)	Cathline 9'; Stepanov 35'; Van der Hoorn (yellow card) 81'	Report	Oufkir (yellow card) 25'; Owusu-Oduro (yellow card) 33'; Smit (yellow card) 81'	Stadium: Stadion Galgenwaard; Attendance: 22,635; Referee: Rob Dieperink

7 March 2026 26	PSV	2–1	AZ	Eindhoven
20:00 CET (UTC+1)	Parrott 45' (o.g.); Pepi (yellow card) 79', (goal) 86'; Drioucech (yellow card) 90'	Report	Van Duijl 13'; Penetra (yellow card) 50'	Stadium: Philips Stadion; Attendance: 35,000; Referee: Sander van der Eijk

15 March 2026 27	AZ	4–0	Heracles	Alkmaar
14:30 CET (UTC+1)	Parrott 5'; Mijnans 45+1'; De Wit 74'; Jensen 84'	Report	Wieckhoff (yellow card) 43'; Zeefuik (yellow card) 56'; Scheperman (yellow card) 70'; Mirani (yellow card) 82'	Stadium: AFAS Stadion; Attendance: 17,809; Referee: Robin Hensgens

22 March 2026 28	Groningen	3–0	AZ	Groningen
16:45 CET (UTC+1)	Peersman 36' (pen.); Van Bergen 58'; Land 76'	Report	Daal (yellow card) 79'	Stadium: Euroborg; Attendance: 22,219; Referee: Martijn Vos

4 April 2026 29	AZ	2–0	Fortuna Sittard	Alkmaar
18:45 CEST (UTC+2)	Meerdink 11'; Mijnans 15'	Report	Márquez (yellow card) 45+1'; Oukili (yellow card) 54'; Duijvestijn (yellow card) 69'	Stadium: AFAS Stadion; Attendance: 18,349; Referee: Richard Martens

12 April 2026 30	AZ	3–0	Heerenveen	Alkmaar
16:45 CEST (UTC+2)	Mijnans 7', 8'; De Wit (yellow card) 55'; Parrott 71'	Report	Braude (yellow card) 42'	Stadium: AFAS Stadion; Attendance: 18,554; Referee: Marc Nagtegaal

23 April 2026 31	Go Ahead Eagles	0–0	AZ	Deventer
18:45 CEST (UTC+2)	Meulensteen (yellow card) 15'; Dirksen (yellow card) 66'	Report	Kasius (yellow card) 80'	Stadium: De Adelaarshorst; Attendance: 9,124; Referee: Jeroen Manschot

3 May 2026 32	AZ	2–2	Twente	Alkmaar
16:45 CEST (UTC+2)	Clasie 13'; Koopmeiners 90+5'	Report	Owusu-Oduro 32' (o.g.); Lammers 55'	Stadium: AFAS Stadion; Attendance: 19,500; Referee: Sander van der Eijk

10 May 2026 33	Feyenoord	1–1	AZ	Rotterdam
16:45 CEST (UTC+2)	Kraaijeveld (yellow card) 30'; Hadj Moussa 57'	Report	Parrott 1'	Stadium: De Kuip; Attendance: 47,500; Referee: Marc Nagtegaal

17 May 2026 34	AZ	3–3	NAC Breda	Alkmaar
14:30 CEST (UTC+2)	Mijnans 8'; Chávez 12'; Meerdink (yellow card) 85', (goal) 90'	Report	Hillen (yellow card) 59'; Soumano 61', 71'; Talvitie 89'	Stadium: AFAS Stadion; Attendance: 18,460; Referee: Edwin van de Graaf

=== KNVB Cup ===
3 December 2025 Second round	PEC Zwolle	1–3	AZ	Zwolle
20:00 CET (UTC+1)	Kostons 43'; Fichtinger (yellow card) 90+3'	Report	Mijnans 53', 82'; Sadiq 90+2', (yellow card) 90+3'	Stadium: MAC3PARK Stadion; Attendance: 13,697; Referee: Danny Makkelie

14 January 2026 Round of 16	AZ	6–0	Ajax	Alkmaar
20:00 CET (UTC+1)	Parrott 2', 33', 80'; Chávez (yellow card) 16'; Koopmeiners 45+1'; Smit 47'; Sadiq 88'	Report	Godts (yellow card) 4'; Wijndal (red card) 66'	Stadium: AFAS Stadion; Attendance: 15,588; Referee: Bas Nijhuis

3 February 2026 Quarter-finals	AZ	2–1 (a.e.t.)	Twente	Alkmaar
19:00 CET (UTC+1)	De Wit (yellow card) 7'; Šín 9'; Goes (yellow card) 46'; Parrott 97', (yellow card) 112'; Patati (yellow card) 102'; Daal (yellow card) 104'	Report	Hlynsson 65'; Pjaca (yellow card) 105+2'; Bruns (yellow card) 120'	Stadium: AFAS Stadion; Attendance: 12,607; Referee: Martin van den Kerkhof

4 March 2026 Semi-finals	AZ	2–1	Telstar	Alkmaar
20:00 CET (UTC+1)	Dijkstra (yellow card) 29'; Bakker 47' (o.g.); Ogidi Nwankwo 51' (o.g.); Smit (yellow card) 57'	Report	Tejan 74'; Brouwer (yellow card) 90+1'	Stadium: AFAS Stadion; Attendance: 18,402; Referee: Jeroen Manschot

19 April 2026 Final	AZ	5–1	NEC	Feyenoord
18:00 CEST (UTC+2)	Clasie (yellow card) 8'; De Wit 32', (yellow card) 53'; Mijnans 67'; Koopmeiners 73'; Smit 90+1' (yellow card) 90+1'; Parrott 90+5', (yellow card) 90+5'	Report	Ouaissa (yellow card) 10'; Sandler (yellow card) 75'; Ogawa 78'; Lebreton (yellow card) 90+4'	Stadium: De Kuip; Attendance: 46,500; Referee: Danny Makkelie

=== UEFA Conference League ===
==== Second qualifying round ====
The draw for the second qualifying round was held on 18 June 2025.

24 July 2025 First leg	Ilves (Finland)	4–3	(Netherlands) AZ	Tampere, Finland
19:00 CEST (UTC+2)	Riski 8', 45+2'; Akinyemi 68'; Söderbäck 71'	Report	Parrott 16'; Goes (yellow card) 43'; Koopmeiners (yellow card) 45+3'; Mijnans 61'; Meerdink 90+1'	Stadium: Tammelan Stadion; Attendance: 5,413; Referee: Matteo Marcenaro (Italy)

31 July 2025 Second leg	AZ (Netherlands)	5–0 (8–4 agg.)	(Finland) Ilves	Alkmaar, Netherlands
18:45 CEST (UTC+2)	Parrott (yellow card) 11', (goal) 22', 26'; Mijnans (yellow card) 17'; Poku 36'; Kasius 42'; Daal (yellow card) 45'; De Wit 74'	Report	Rale (yellow card) 61'	Stadium: AFAS Stadion; Attendance: 13,057; Referee: Ivar Orri Kristjansson (Iceland)

==== Third qualifying round ====
The draw for the third qualifying round was held on 21 July 2025.

7 August 2025 First leg	AZ (Netherlands)	3–0	(Liechtenstein) Vaduz	Alkmaar, Netherlands
20:00 CEST (UTC+2)	Parrott 29', 74', (yellow card) 53'; De Wit (yellow card) 62'; Meerdink 80', (yellow card) 81'	Report	De Donno (yellow card) 82'	Stadium: AFAS Stadion; Attendance: 11,476; Referee: Bastien Dechepy (France)

14 August 2025 Second leg	Vaduz (Liechtenstein)	0–1 (0–4 agg.)	(Netherlands) AZ	Vaduz, Liechtenstein
19:30 CEST (UTC+2)	Mack (yellow card) 13'; Berisha (yellow card) 64'; Monsberger (yellow card) 68'; Hoxha (yellow card) 86'	Report	Daal (yellow card) 2' (yellow-red card) 7'; Buurmeester (yellow card) 47'; Goes (yellow card) 64'; Parrott 88' (pen.)	Stadium: Rheinpark Stadion; Attendance: 1,530; Referee: Snir Levi (Israel)

==== Play-off round ====
21 August 2025 First leg	Levski Sofia (Bulgaria)	0–2	(Netherlands) AZ	Sofia, Bulgaria
20:00 CEST (UTC+2)	Rildo (yellow card) 24'; Dimitrov (yellow card) 90+5'	Report	Jensen (yellow card) 44'; Sadiq 56', (yellow card) 66'; Parrott 62'; Goes (yellow card) 90+5'	Stadium: Vasil Levski National Stadium; Attendance: 29,930; Referee: Tamás Bognár (Hungary)

28 August 2025 Second leg	AZ (Netherlands)	4–1 (6–1 agg.)	(Bulgaria) Levski Sofia	Alkmaar, Netherlands
19:30 CEST (UTC+2)	Sadiq 3', 45+1'; Meerdink 6'; Clasie (yellow card) 9'; Zeefuik 86'	Report	Bala 47'; Rupanov (yellow card) 60'; Mitkov (yellow card) 66'; Sangaré (yellow card) 68'	Stadium: AFAS Stadion; Attendance: 12,612; Referee: Damian Sylwestrzak (Poland)

==== League phase ====
The draw for the league phase was held on 29 August 2025.

Pos	Team	Pld	W	D	L	GF	GA	GD	Pts	Qualification
12	(Turkish Football Federation) Samsunspor	6	3	1	2	10	6	+4	10	Advance to knockout phase play-offs (seeded)
13	(Football Association of Slovenia) Celje	6	3	1	2	8	7	+1	10	Advance to knockout phase play-offs (seeded)
14	(Royal Dutch Football Association) AZ	6	3	1	2	7	7	0	10	Advance to knockout phase play-offs (seeded)
15	(Italian Football Federation) Fiorentina	6	3	0	3	8	5	+3	9	Advance to knockout phase play-offs (seeded)
16	(Croatian Football Federation) Rijeka	6	2	3	1	5	2	+3	9	Advance to knockout phase play-offs (seeded)

Source: UEFA
Rules for classification: League phase tiebreakers

Round	1	2	3	4	5	6
Ground	A	H	A	H	A	H
Result	L	W	L	W	W	D
Position	35	21	27	20	13	14
Points	0	3	3	6	9	10

Source: UEFA
A = Away; H = Home; W = Win; D = Draw; L = Loss

Win Draw Loss Fixtures

2 October 2025 1	AEK Larnaca (Cyprus)	4–0	(Netherlands) AZ	Larnaca, Cyprus
22:00 CEST (UTC+2)	Rubio 25'; Bajić 54'; Ivanović 73'; Rohdén 83'	Report		Stadium: AEK Arena; Attendance: 3,404; Referee: Daniel Schlager (Germany)

23 October 2025 2	AZ (Netherlands)	1–0	(Slovakia) Slovan Bratislava	Alkmaar, Netherlands
18:45 CEST (UTC+2)	Mijnans 44'	Report		Stadium: AFAS Stadion; Attendance: 12,086; Referee: Tobias Stieler (Germany)

6 November 2025 3	Crystal Palace (England)	3–1	(Netherlands) AZ	London, England
20:00 GMT (UTC+0)	Lacroix 22'; Sarr 45+4', 57'	Report	Mijnans 54'	Stadium: Selhurst Park; Attendance: 21,459; Referee: Daniele Chiffi (Italy)

27 November 2025 4	AZ (Netherlands)	2–0	(Republic of Ireland) Shelbourne	Alkmaar, Netherlands
18:45 CET (UTC+1)	Kwakman (yellow card) 40'; De Wit 70'; Jensen 86', (yellow card) 90+3'	Report	Henry-Francis (yellow card) 15'; Wood (yellow card) 25'; Barrett (yellow card) 66'; Martin (yellow card) 76'	Stadium: AFAS Stadion; Attendance: 15,210; Referee: Michal Očenáš (Slovakia)

11 December 2025 5	Drita (Kosovo)	0–3	(Netherlands) AZ	Gjilan, Kosovo
18:45 CET (UTC+1)		Report	Mijnans 17'; Jensen 58'; Sadiq 90'	Stadium: Gjilan City Stadium; Attendance: 2,231; Referee: Dalibor Černý (Czech Republic)

18 December 2025 6	AZ (Netherlands)	0–0	(Poland) Jagiellonia Białystok	Alkmaar, Netherlands
21:00 CET (UTC+1)		Report		Stadium: AFAS Stadion; Attendance: 13,017; Referee: Stefan Ebner (Austria)

==== Knockout phase ====
===== Knockout phase play-offs =====
19 February 2026 First leg	Noah (Armenia)	1–0	(Netherlands) AZ	Yerevan, Armenia
18:45 CET (UTC+1)	Zolotić (yellow card) 24'; Sualehe (yellow card) 48'; Hambardzumyan 53'	Report	Goes (yellow card) 68'	Stadium: Vazgen Sargsyan Republican Stadium; Attendance: 13,040; Referee: Orel Grinfeld (Israel)

26 February 2026 Second leg	AZ (Netherlands)	4–0 (4–1 agg.)	(Armenia) Noah	Alkmaar, Netherlands
21:00 CET (UTC+1)	Daal 5'; Mijnans 39', 54', (yellow card) 44'; Dijkstra (yellow card) 69'; Boogaard (yellow card) 87'; Jensen 90+1'	Report	Muradyan (yellow card) 73'	Stadium: AFAS Stadion; Attendance: 11,531; Referee: Nikola Dabanović (Montenegro)

===== Round of 16 =====
12 March 2026 First leg	AZ (Netherlands)	2–1	(Czech Republic) Sparta Prague	Alkmaar, Netherlands
18:45 CET (UTC+1)	Parrott 29', 87'; Kasius (yellow card) 49'	Report	Kairinen (yellow card) 48'; Vojta 50'	Stadium: AFAS Stadion; Attendance: 14,013; Referee: Sebastian Gishamer (Austria)

19 March 2026 Second leg	Sparta Prague (Czech Republic)	0–4 (1–6 agg.)	(Netherlands) AZ	Prague, Czech Republic
21:00 CET (UTC+1)	Kuchta (yellow card) 81'; Rrahmani (yellow card) 86'	Report	Jensen 8' (yellow card) 55'; Parrott 58'; Kasius (yellow card) 60'; Mijnans 62'; Daal 73'	Stadium: Stadion Letná; Attendance: 18,102; Referee: Srđan Jovanović (Serbia)

===== Quarter-finals =====
9 April 2026 First leg	Shakhtar Donetsk (Ukraine)	3–0	(Netherlands) AZ	Kraków, Poland
21:00 CEST (UTC+2)	Pedro Henrique (yellow card) 59'; Pedrinho 72'; Alisson 81', 83'	Report	Penetra (yellow card) 48'; De Wit (yellow card) 64'	Stadium: Henryk Reyman Municipal Stadium; Attendance: 9,004; Referee: Nick Walsh (Scotland)

16 April 2026 Second leg	AZ (Netherlands)	2–2 (2–5 agg.)	(Ukraine) Shakhtar Donetsk	Alkmaar, Netherlands
18:45 CEST (UTC+2)	Chávez (yellow card) 31'; Van Duijl (yellow card) 33'; Boogaard (yellow card) 35'; Sadiq (yellow card) 45+2'; Jensen 73'; Šín 80'	Report	Isaque Silva (yellow card) 24'; Alisson 58'; Tobias (yellow card) 71'; Eguinaldo (yellow card) 78'; Luca Meirelles 83'; Matvienko (yellow card) 85'	Stadium: AFAS Stadion; Attendance: 15,439; Referee: Sven Jablonski (Germany)

== Statistics ==
=== Clean sheets ===
Rank	No.	Pos.	Player	Eredivisie	KNVB Cup	Conference League	Total
1	1	GK	(Netherlands) Owusu-Oduro	6	0	5	11
2	41	GK	(Netherlands) Jeroen Zoet	2	2	1	5
Totals				8	2	6	16

Last updated: 24 May 2026.
Source: FBref.com
