= Ro-Zangelo Daal =

Dutch footballer (born 2004)

Personal information
- Date of birth: 10 February 2004 (age 22)
- Place of birth: Amsterdam, The Netherlands
- Height: 1.73 m (5 ft 8 in)
- Position: Forward

Team information
- Current team: AZ
- Number: 27

Youth career
- –2015: DVC Buiksloot
- 2015–2023: AZ Alkmaar

Senior career*
| Years | Team | Apps | (Gls) |
| 2022–2026 | Jong AZ | 79 | (24) |
| 2024– | AZ | 37 | (6) |

International career^{‡}
| 2021 | Netherlands U18 | 3 | (2) |
| 2025– | Netherlands U21 | 3 | (0) |
- * Club domestic league appearances and goals as of 25 October 2026 ‡ National team caps and goals as of 14 October 2025

Ro-Zangelo Daal (born 10 February 2004) is a Dutch footballer who plays as a winger for Eredivisie club AZ and their reserve team Jong AZ, making his debut for the senior team during the 2024–25 season in the Eredivisie and also playing for the club in the UEFA Europa League.

== Club career ==
He was born in Amsterdam. He played as youngster at DVC Buiksloot, before moving across in 2015 to the AZ Alkmaar academy, Daal signed a contract with AZ in the summer of 2021. His form for the AZ youth sides saw him being offered a new and extended contract in March 2022 to keep him in Alzmaar until 2025. Daal has been tipped as a "wonderkid" in the football management computer game Football Manager in both 2021 and 2022.

Daal made his debut for Jong AZ against Jong PSV in a home 2–0 win in the Eerste Divisie on 1 April 2022. Daal scored his first senior league goal on 3 February 2023 in a 4–3 win against VVV Venlo.

On 21 April 2023, Daal scored as AZ won through against Sporting Lisbon to reach the final of the 2022–23 UEFA Youth League. He also played in the UEFA Youth League final against Hajduk Split as AZ ran out 5–0 winners. On 1 January 2024, he signed a new four-and-a-half year contract with the club.

On 7 November 2024, he opened the scoring for AZ in a 3–1 win over Fenerbache in the UEFA Europa League. He also featured for the club in the Eredivisie in a 2–1 home defeat to Willem II Tilburg on 10 November 2024. In January 2025, AZ officially announced that Ro-Zangelo Daal had been moved up from Jong AZ team to the AZ first team squad. He set up the first goal for Mees de Wit as he played in the 2026 KNVB Cup final, in a 5–1 win over NEC Nijmegen on 19 April 2026.

== International career ==
Born in the Netherlands, Daal is of Surinamese descent. He is also eligible to play for Curaçao. He scored for the Dutch under-18 national side in a 5–0 win over Italy under-18s in September 2021.

== Career statistics ==
As of match played 25 October 2026

Appearances and goals by club, season and competition
| Club | Season | League | | | KNVB Cup | | Europe | | Other | | Total | |
| Club | Season | Division | Apps | Goals | Apps | Goals | Apps | Goals | Apps | Goals | Apps | Goals |
|---|---|---|---|---|---|---|---|---|---|---|---|---|
| Jong AZ | 2021–22 | Eerste Divisie | 2 | 0 | — | | — | | — | | 2 | 0 |
| Jong AZ | 2022–23 | Eerste Divisie | 12 | 2 | — | | — | | — | | 12 | 2 |
| Jong AZ | 2023–24 | Eerste Divisie | 32 | 6 | — | | — | | — | | 32 | 6 |
| Jong AZ | 2024–25 | Eerste Divisie | 31 | 3 | — | | — | | — | | 31 | 3 |
| Jong AZ | 2025–26 | Eerste Divisie | 2 | 1 | — | | — | | — | | 2 | 1 |
| Jong AZ | Total | | 79 | 24 | — | | — | | — | | 79 | 24 |
| AZ | 2024–25 | Eredivisie | 3 | 0 | 0 | 0 | 4 (Note: Appearances in UEFA Europa League) | 1 | — | | 7 | 1 |
| AZ | 2025–26 | Eredivisie | 24 | 1 | 4 | 0 | 14 (Note: Appearances in UEFA Conference League) | 2 | — | | 42 | 3 |
| AZ | 2026–27 | Eredivisie | 10 | 5 | 0 | 0 | 3 | 0 | 1 (Note: Appearance in Johan Cruyff Shield) | 1 | 14 | 6 |
| AZ | Total | | 37 | 6 | 4 | 0 | 21 | 3 | 1 | 1 | 63 | 10 |
| Career total | | | 116 | 30 | 4 | 0 | 21 | 3 | 1 | 1 | 143 | 34 |

== Honours ==
AZ

- KNVB Cup: 2025–26
- Johan Cruyff Shield: 2026
