= Jesse Buurmeester =

Dutch football player

Personal information
- Date of birth: 26 June 2004 (age 22)
- Place of birth: Egmond aan den Hoef, Netherlands
- Position: Defender

Team information
- Current team: Rijnsburgse Boys
- Number: 15

Youth career
- –2015: Zeevogels
- 2015–2023: AZ Alkmaar

Senior career*
Years	Team	Apps	(Gls)
2022–2024	Jong AZ	0	(0)
2024–2025	Volendam	0	(0)
2025-	Rijnsburgse Boys	9	(0)
- * Club domestic league appearances and goals as of 15 May 2026

Jesse Buurmeester (born 26 June 2004) is a Dutch professional footballer who plays for Rijnsburgse Boys.

== Early life ==
He was born in Egmond aan den Hoef. His brother Zico Buurmeester is also a professional footballer.

== Career ==
In June, 2021 Jesse signed his first pro contract with AZ to keep with the club until the end of the 2022–23 season, with the option of an extra year. He was included in a Jong AZ match day squad for the first time on April 21, 2023, being named on the substitute bench for the Eerste Divisie clash away at FC Dordrecht.

He joined FC Volendam in July 2024. The following year, he was playing for Rijnsburgse Boys.

== International career ==
In March 2020 he was called up to the Dutch under-16 squad as a reserve.
