= Billy van Duijl =

Dutch footballer (born 2005)

Personal information
- Date of birth: 4 October 2005 (age 21)
- Place of birth: Volendam, The Netherlands
- Height: 1.90 m (6 ft 3 in)
- Position: Defender

Team information
- Current team: Cambuur (on loan from AZ)
- Number: 14

Youth career
- -2022: Volendam

Senior career*
| Years | Team | Apps | (Gls) |
| 2022–2024 | Jong Volendam | 35 | (1) |
| 2022–2024 | Volendam | 5 | (0) |
| 2024– | Jong AZ | 49 | (0) |
| 2026– | AZ | 7 | (1) |
| 2026– | → Cambuur (loan) | 5 | (0) |

International career^{‡}
| 2022–2023 | Netherlands U18 | 4 | (0) |
| 2023 | Netherlands U19 | 3 | (0) |
- * Club domestic league appearances and goals as of 11 October 2026 ‡ National team caps and goals as of 21 November 2023

Billy van Duijl (born 4 October 2005) is a Dutch professional footballer who plays as a defender for Eredivisie club Cambuur on loan from AZ Alkmaar.

== Club career ==
From Volendam, he came through the youth system at FC Volendam, making his debut at the age of 16 in the Eerste Divisie against FC Dordrecht in August 2022, having only made his debut for Jong Volendam a few months earlier.

He joined AZ Alkmaar in 2024. Having played 47 matches for Jong AZ, he started to play for the senior AZ team in 2026, despite having options to leave on loan. Van Duijl scored his first goal for AZ in March 2026 against PSV. He signed a new contract with the club in April 2026, having played ten matches for the first team in all competitions. That month, van Duijl started for the club against Ukrainian club Shakhtar Donetsk in the UEFA Conference League. On 19 April 2026, he appeared as a substitute in the 2026 KNVB Cup final, as AZ defeated NEC 5–1.

On 25 August 2026, van Duijl was loaned to Cambuur for the season.

== Personal life ==
Outside of football, van Duijl is also pursuing a part-time degree in Business & Innovation.

== Career statistics ==
As of match played 2 August 2026

Appearances and goals by club, season and competition
| Club | Season | League | | | Cup | | Europe | | Other | | Total | |
| Club | Season | Division | Apps | Goals | Apps | Goals | Apps | Goals | Apps | Goals | Apps | Goals |
|---|---|---|---|---|---|---|---|---|---|---|---|---|
| Jong Volendam | 2021–22 | Tweede Divisie | 8 | 0 | — | | — | | — | | 8 | 0 |
| Jong Volendam | 2022–23 | Tweede Divisie | 27 | 0 | — | | — | | — | | 27 | 0 |
| Jong Volendam | Total | | 35 | 0 | — | | — | | — | | 35 | 0 |
| Volendam | 2021–22 | Eerste Divisie | 2 | 0 | — | | — | | — | | 2 | 0 |
| Volendam | 2022–23 | Eredivisie | 3 | 0 | 0 | 0 | — | | — | | 3 | 0 |
| Volendam | 2023–24 | Eredivisie | 0 | 0 | 0 | 0 | — | | — | | 0 | 0 |
| Volendam | Total | | 5 | 0 | 0 | 0 | — | | — | | 5 | 0 |
| Jong AZ | 2024–25 | Eerste Divisie | 23 | 0 | — | | — | | — | | 23 | 0 |
| Jong AZ | 2025–26 | Eerste Divisie | 24 | 0 | — | | — | | — | | 24 | 0 |
| Jong AZ | Total | | 47 | 0 | — | | — | | — | | 47 | 0 |
| AZ | 2025–26 | Eredivisie | 7 | 1 | 2 | 0 | 4 (Note: Appearances in UEFA Conference League) | 0 | — | | 13 | 1 |
| AZ | 2026–27 | Eredivisie | 0 | 0 | 0 | 0 | 0 | 0 | 1 (Note: Appearance in Johan Cruyff Shield) | 0 | 1 | 0 |
| AZ | Total | | 7 | 1 | 2 | 0 | 4 | 0 | 1 | 0 | 14 | 1 |
| Career total | | | 94 | 1 | 2 | 0 | 4 | 0 | 1 | 0 | 99 | 1 |

== Honours ==
AZ

- KNVB Cup: 2025–26
- Johan Cruyff Shield: 2026
