= Koopmeiners =

Koopmeiners is a Dutch surname. Notable people with the surname include:

- Peer Koopmeiners (born 2000), Dutch footballer
- Teun Koopmeiners (born 1998), Dutch footballer, brother of Peer
