= Daniël Deen =

Dutch footballer (born 2003)

Personal information
- Full name: Daniël Virginio Deen
- Date of birth: 13 February 2003 (age 23)
- Place of birth: Netherlands
- Height: 1.88 m (6 ft 2 in)
- Position: Goalkeeper

Youth career
- –2014: VSV
- 2014–2022: AZ

Senior career*
Years	Team	Apps	(Gls)
2023–2026	Jong AZ	36	(0)
2023–2026	AZ	0	(0)
- * Club domestic league appearances and goals as of 17 May 2026

Daniël Virginio Deen (born 13 February 2003) is a Dutch professional footballer who plays as a goalkeeper.

== Career ==
Daniël Virginio Deen joined the AZ academy at the under-12 level, having previously been with VSV in Velsen. He agreed to his first professional contract with the club in July 2021, signing a two-year contract.

In December 2022 Deen was included in a squad of 30 players travelling with the AZ first team on a mid-season training camp in Valencia, Spain. He made his professional debut for Jong AZ in January 2023 in the Eerste Divisie keeping a clean sheet in a 2–0 win over Jong Utrecht. That same month he also appeared in his first match day squad Saturday for AZ Alkmaar, being named amongst the match day substitutes in the Eredivisie.

== Personal life ==
Born in the Netherlands, Deen is of Brazilian descent through his mother. He plays with his maternal surname Virginio on his shirt, to honour his Brazilian relatives.
