= Zico Buurmeester =

Dutch footballer (born 2002)

Personal information
- Date of birth: 7 June 2002 (age 24)
- Place of birth: Egmond aan den Hoef, Netherlands
- Height: 1.84 m (6 ft 0 in)
- Position: Midfielder

Team information
- Current team: Leganés

Youth career
- 2006–2012: Zeevogels
- 2012–2020: AZ

Senior career*
Years	Team	Apps	(Gls)
2020–2026	Jong AZ	84	(13)
2021–2026	AZ	36	(5)
2023–2024	→ PEC Zwolle (loan)	17	(0)
2025–2026	→ PEC Zwolle (loan)	22	(2)
2026–	Leganés	0	(0)
- * Club domestic league appearances and goals as of 21 May 2026

Zico Buurmeester (born 7 June 2002) is a Dutch professional footballer who plays as a midfielder for Segunda División club Leganés.

== Career ==
Buurmeester signed his first professional contract with Jong AZ on 24 January 2020. He made his professional debut with Jong AZ in a 6–2 Eerste Divisie loss to FC Volendam on 19 October 2020.

On 18 July 2023, Buurmeester joined PEC Zwolle on a season-long loan. On 1 September 2025, he returned to Zwolle on another loan.

On 6 July 2026, Buurmeester moved abroad for the first time in his career, after signing a three-year contract with Segunda División side Leganés.

== Personal life ==
His younger brother Jesse Buurmeester signed his first pro contract with AZ in June 2021.

== Career statistics ==
As of match played 17 May 2026

Appearances and goals by club, season and competition
Club	Season	League			Cup		Europe		Other		Total	
Club	Season	Division	Apps	Goals	Apps	Goals	Apps	Goals	Apps	Goals	Apps	Goals
Jong AZ	2020–21	Eerste Divisie	20	0	—		—		—		20	0
Jong AZ	2021–22	Eerste Divisie	34	8	—		—		—		34	8
Jong AZ	2022–23	Eerste Divisie	27	4	—		—		—		27	4
Jong AZ	2024–25	Eerste Divisie	2	1	—		—		—		2	1
Jong AZ	Total		83	13	—		—		—		83	13
AZ	2021–22	Eredivisie	2	0	0	0	0	0	—		2	0
AZ	2022–23	Eredivisie	7	1	0	0	0	0	—		7	1
AZ	2023–24	Eredivisie	0	0	0	0	0	0	—		0	0
AZ	2024–25	Eredivisie	28	4	3	0	10 (Note: Appearances in UEFA Europa League)	0	—		41	4
AZ	2025–26	Eredivisie	1	0	0	0	5 (Note: Appearances in UEFA Conference League)	0	—		6	0
AZ	Total		38	5	3	0	15	0	—		56	5
PEC Zwolle (loan)	2023–24	Eredivisie	17	0	1	0	—		—		18	0
PEC Zwolle (loan)	2025–26	Eredivisie	22	2	1	0	—		—		23	2
Leganés	2026–27	Segunda División	0	0	0	0	—		—		0	0
Career total			160	20	5	0	15	0	0	0	180	20
