= Elijah Dijkstra =

Dutch footballer (born 2006)

Personal information
- Full name: Elijah Raphaël Dijkstra
- Date of birth: 5 August 2006 (age 20)
- Place of birth: Assendelft, Netherlands
- Height: 1.72 m (5 ft 8 in)
- Position: Right-back

Team information
- Current team: AZ
- Number: 22

Youth career
- Fortuna Wormerveer
- 2019–2023: AZ

Senior career*
Years	Team	Apps	(Gls)
2023–	Jong AZ	36	(3)
2025–	AZ	32	(0)

International career^{‡}
2021–2022	Netherlands U16	6	(0)
2022–2023	Netherlands U17	6	(0)
2023–2024	Netherlands U18	5	(0)
2024–	Netherlands U19	13	(0)
2025–	Netherlands U21	6	(0)
Medal record
Men's football
Representing Netherlands
UEFA European Under-19 Championship
Winner	2025 Romania
- * Club domestic league appearances and goals as of 25 October 2026 ‡ National team caps and goals as of 22:15, 6 October 2026 (UTC)

Elijah Raphaël Dijkstra (born 5 August 2006) is a Dutch professional footballer who plays as a right-back for Eredivisie club AZ.

== Club career ==
A youth product of Fortuna Wormerveer, Dijkstra joined the academy of AZ in 2019 and was promoted to Jong AZ in 2023. On 5 August, he signed his first professional contract with AZ until 2029. On 27 February 2025, he made his debut with the senior AZ squad in a 2–2 (5–6) penalty shootout win over Heracles Almelo in the KNVB Cup.

== International career ==
Born in the continental Netherlands, Dijkstra is of Curaçaoan descent. He was called up to the Netherlands U17s for the 2023 UEFA European Under-17 Championship. He was part of the Netherlands U19s that won the 2025 UEFA European Under-19 Championship.

== Career statistics ==
As of match played 25 October 2026

Appearances and goals by club, season and competition
Club	Season	League			KNVB Cup		Europe		Other		Total	
Club	Season	Division	Apps	Goals	Apps	Goals	Apps	Goals	Apps	Goals	Apps	Goals
Jong AZ	2022–23	Eerste Divisie	1	0	—		—		—		1	0
Jong AZ	2023–24	Eerste Divisie	1	0	—		—		—		1	0
Jong AZ	2024–25	Eerste Divisie	26	3	—		—		—		26	3
Jong AZ	2025–26	Eerste Divisie	1	0	—		—		—		1	0
Jong AZ	Total		29	3	—		—		—		29	3
AZ	2024–25	Eredivisie	2	0	1	0	0	0	—		3	0
AZ	2025–26	Eredivisie	20	0	4	0	12 (Note: Appearances in UEFA Conference League)	0	—		36	0
AZ	2026–27	Eredivisie	10	0	0	0	1 (Note: Appearances in UEFA Europa League)	0	1 (Note: Appearance in Johan Cruyff Shield)	1	12	1
AZ	Total		32	0	5	0	13	0	1	1	51	1
Career total			61	3	5	0	13	0	1	1	80	4

== Honours ==
AZ

- KNVB Cup: 2025–26
- Johan Cruyff Shield: 2026

Netherlands U19

- UEFA European Under-19 Championship: 2025
