= Alexandre Penetra =

Portuguese footballer

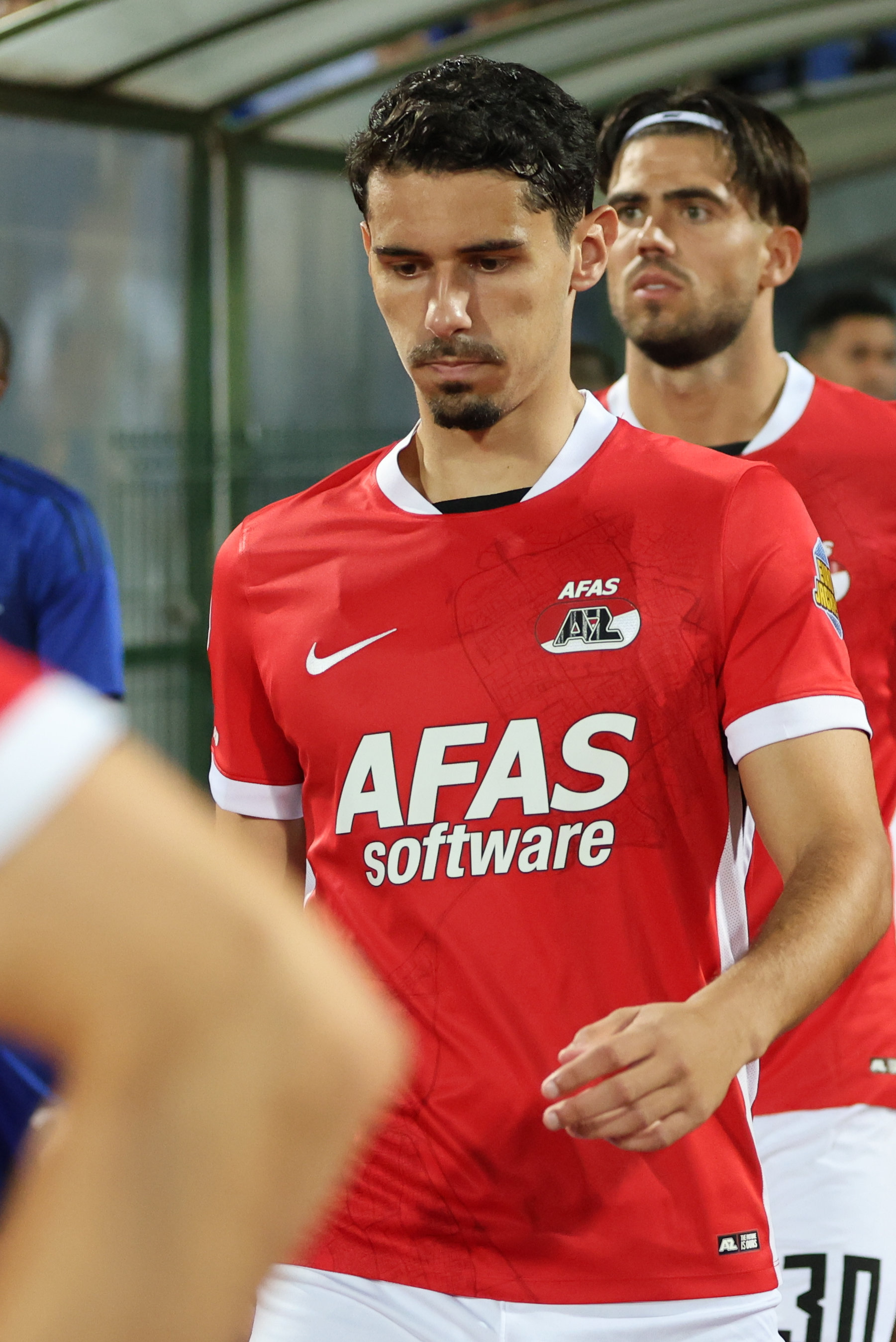
- Penetra playing AZ in 2025

Personal information
- Full name: Alexandre Manuel Penetra Correia
- Date of birth: 9 September 2001 (age 25)
- Place of birth: Viseu, Portugal
- Height: 1.84 m (6 ft 0 in)
- Positions: Centre-back; right-back

Team information
- Current team: Çorum (on loan from AZ)
- Number: 5

Youth career
- 2009–2010: Os Pestinhas
- 2010–2013: CB Viseu
- 2013–2020: Benfica
- 2020–2021: Famalicão

Senior career*
Years	Team	Apps	(Gls)
2021–2023	Famalicão	59	(3)
2023–	AZ	89	(2)
2024	Jong AZ	1	(0)
2026–	→ Çorum (loan)	5	(0)

International career^{‡}
2016	Portugal U15	2	(0)
2016–2017	Portugal U16	7	(0)
2018	Portugal U18	1	(0)
2022–2023	Portugal U21	9	(0)
- * Club domestic league appearances and goals as of 11 October 2026 ‡ National team caps and goals as of 00ː20, 11 December 2023 (UTC)

Alexandre Manuel Penetra Correia, known as Alexandre Penetra (born 9 September 2001) is a Portuguese professional footballer who plays as a centre-back or right-back for Süper Lig club Çorum on Turkey on loan from Dutch club AZ.

== Club career ==
Penetra is a youth product of Os Pestinhas, CB Viseu, Benfica and Famalicão. In August 2020, he signed a three-year contract with Famalicão.

He made his Primeira Liga debut for Famalicão on 15 August 2021 in a game against Porto.

On 24 July 2023, Penetra signed a five-year contract with AZ Alkmaar. In doing so, he followed in the footsteps of his fellow countryman, Tiago Dantas.

On 19 December 2025, following over 100 appearances in three seasons for AZ, Penetra renewed his contract with the club until June 2029.

On 3 August 2026, Penetra was loaned to Çorum in Turkey, with an option to buy.

== International career ==
Penetra is a youth international for Portugal, having played up to the Portugal U21s.

== Career statistics ==
=== Club ===
As of match played 17 May 2026

Appearances and goals by club, season and competition
Club	Season	League			National cup (Note: Includes Taça de Portugal, KNVB Cup)		League cup (Note: Includes Taça da Liga)		Continental		Total	
Club	Season	Division	Apps	Goals	Apps	Goals	Apps	Goals	Apps	Goals	Apps	Goals
Famalicão	2021–22	Primeira Liga	30	1	2	1	2	0	—		34	2
Famalicão	2022–23	Primeira Liga	29	2	5	2	2	0	—		36	4
Famalicão	Total		59	3	7	3	4	0	—		70	6
AZ Alkmaar	2023–24	Eredivisie	25	0	3	0	—		7 (Note: Appearances in UEFA Conference League)	0	35	0
AZ Alkmaar	2024–25	Eredivisie	33	1	2	0	—		11 (Note: Appearances in UEFA Europa League)	0	46	1
AZ Alkmaar	2025–26	Eredivisie	33	2	5	0	—		16	0	54	2
AZ Alkmaar	Total		91	3	10	0	—		34	0	135	3
Career total			150	6	17	3	4	0	34	0	205	9

== Honours ==
AZ

- KNVB Cup: 2025–26

Individual

- Primeira Liga Goal of the Month: December 2022/January 2023
- Eredivisie Team of the Month: February 2025, May 2025
