= Kees Smit =

Dutch footballer (born 2006)

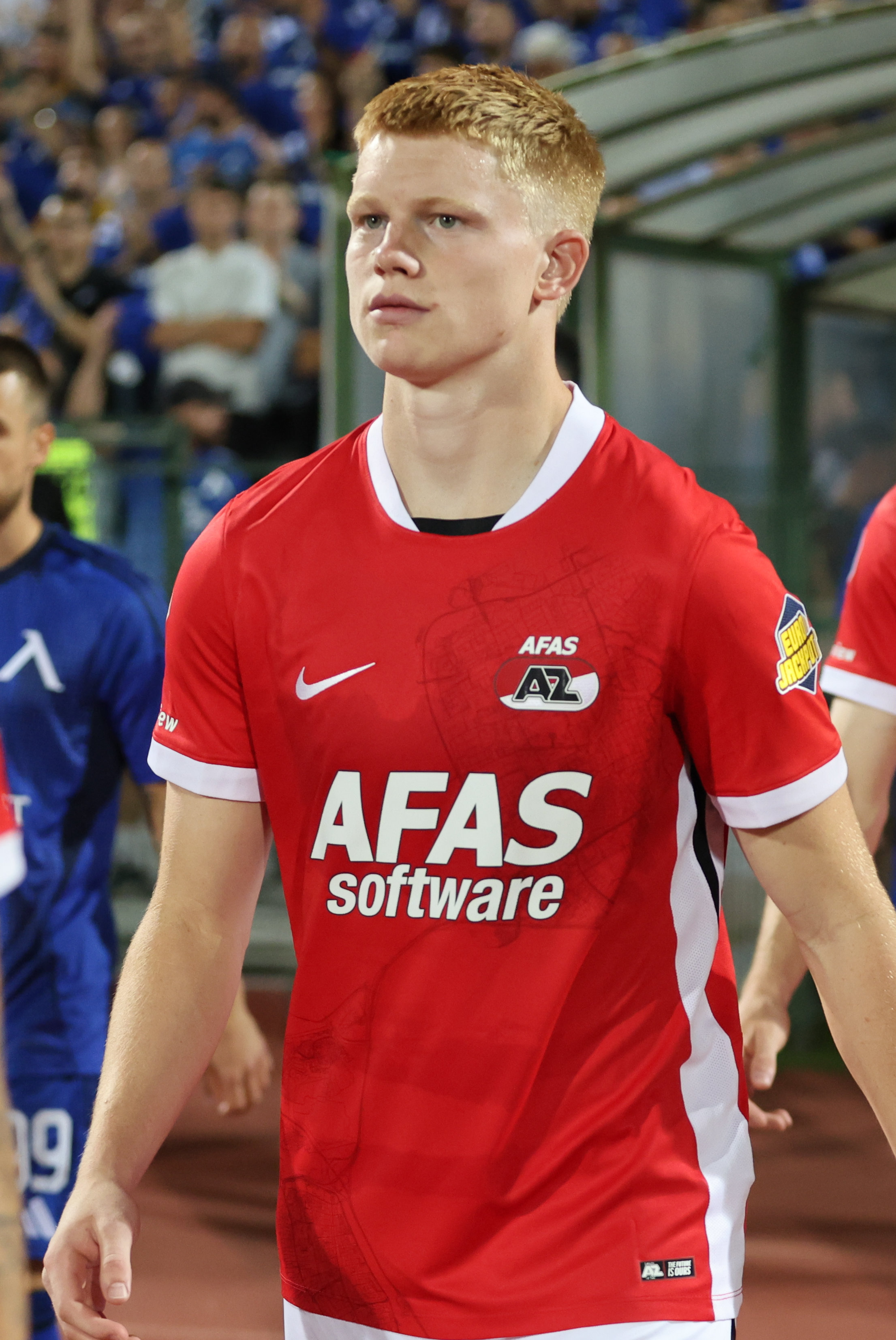
- Smit with AZ in 2025

Personal information
- Full name: Kees Henricus Petrus Smit
- Date of birth: 20 January 2006 (age 20)
- Place of birth: Heiloo, Netherlands
- Height: 1.82 m (6 ft 0 in)
- Position: Midfielder

Team information
- Current team: AZ
- Number: 26

Youth career
- 2015–2023: AZ

Senior career*
Years	Team	Apps	(Gls)
2023–2025	Jong AZ	46	(10)
2024–	AZ	52	(3)

International career^{‡}
2021–2022	Netherlands U16	6	(0)
2022–2023	Netherlands U17	7	(0)
2023	Netherlands U18	3	(0)
2024–2025	Netherlands U19	16	(4)
2025–	Netherlands U21	2	(0)
2026–	Netherlands	1	(0)
Medal record
Men's football
Representing Netherlands
UEFA European Under-19 Championship
Winner	2025
- * Club domestic league appearances and goals as of 20 September 2026 ‡ National team caps and goals as of 27 March 2026

Kees Henricus Petrus Smit (born 20 January 2006) is a Dutch footballer who plays as a midfielder for Eredivisie club AZ and the Netherlands national team.

== Club career ==
From Heiloo, Smit joined the academy at AZ at nine years-old in 2015. He then became the youngest member of their under-12 squad. After progressing through the ranks at AZ, he signed a three-and-a-half-year professional contract in January 2021.

In December 2022, Smit was included with the first team squad on their mid-season break travelling training party to Valencia, Spain. In January 2023, a goal Smit scored in a five-a-side indoor game went viral due to its unusual nature, as he beat the outrushing goalkeeper with shot rebounded from the side wall. Later that month, Smit made his professional debut for Jong AZ in the Eerste Divisie in a home match against Helmond Sport, on 23 January 2023.

With AZ under-19s playing in the UEFA Youth League he was part of the team that beat Barcelona and Real Madrid on consecutive rounds to reach the semi-finals in March 2023. Smit scored a long range goal in the UEFA Youth League last-sixteen tie against Barcelona that brought praise. He also played in the UEFA Youth League final against Hajduk Split as AZ ran out 5–0 winners.

He made his UEFA Europa League debut for AZ on 7 November 2024 in a 3–1 home win against Fenerbahçe, scoring the second goal and being credited with an assist for the third. He played in the final of the KNVB Cup as AZ lost to Go Ahead Eagles on penalties on 21 April 2025. The game had ended 1–1 in normal time after Go Ahead Eagles scored a 98th-minute equaliser. The following season, he played in the 2026 KNVB Cup final, and this time scored in a 5–1 win over NEC on 19 April 2026.

== International career ==
In November 2021, Smit played for the Netherlands national under-16 football team against the Belgian under-16s. Smit has since been selected for the Dutch U17s. Smit played for the Dutch U19s during the 2025 UEFA European Under-19 Championship which they won for the first time, Smit became player of the tournament.

Smit made his senior international debut for the Dutch national team starting in a 2–1 friendly win against Norway on 27 March 2026.

== Career statistics ==
=== Club ===
As of match played 20 September 2026

Appearances and goals by club, season and competition
Club	Season	League			KNVB Cup		Europe		Other		Total	
Club	Season	Division	Apps	Goals	Apps	Goals	Apps	Goals	Apps	Goals	Apps	Goals
Jong AZ	2022–23	Eerste Divisie	4	0	—		—		—		4	0
Jong AZ	2023–24	Eerste Divisie	29	2	—		—		—		29	2
Jong AZ	2024–25	Eerste Divisie	13	8	—		—		—		13	8
Jong AZ	Total		46	10	—		—		—		46	10
AZ	2023–24	Eredivisie	1	0	—		—		—		1	0
AZ	2024–25	Eredivisie	20	0	3	1	7 (Note: Appearances in UEFA Europa League)	1	—		30	2
AZ	2025–26	Eredivisie	26	3	4	2	16 (Note: Appearances in UEFA Conference League)	0	—		46	5
AZ	2026–27	Eredivisie	5	0	0	0	1	0	1 (Note: Appearance in Johan Cruyff Shield)	0	7	0
AZ	Total		52	3	7	3	24	1	1	0	84	7
Career total			98	13	7	3	24	1	1	0	130	17

=== International ===
As of match played 27 March 2026

Appearances and goals by national team and year
National team	Year	Apps	Goals
Netherlands	2026	1	0
Total		1	0

== Honours ==
AZ

- KNVB Cup: 2025–26
- Johan Cruyff Shield: 2026

Netherlands U19

- UEFA European Under-19 Championship: 2025

Individual

- UEFA European Under-19 Championship top scorer: 2025
- UEFA European Under-19 Championship Player of the Tournament: 2025
- UEFA European Under-19 Championship Team of the Tournament: 2025
- UEFA Conference League Young Player of the Season: 2025–26
- UEFA Conference League Team of the Season: 2025–26
