= Wouter Goes =

Dutch footballer (born 2004)

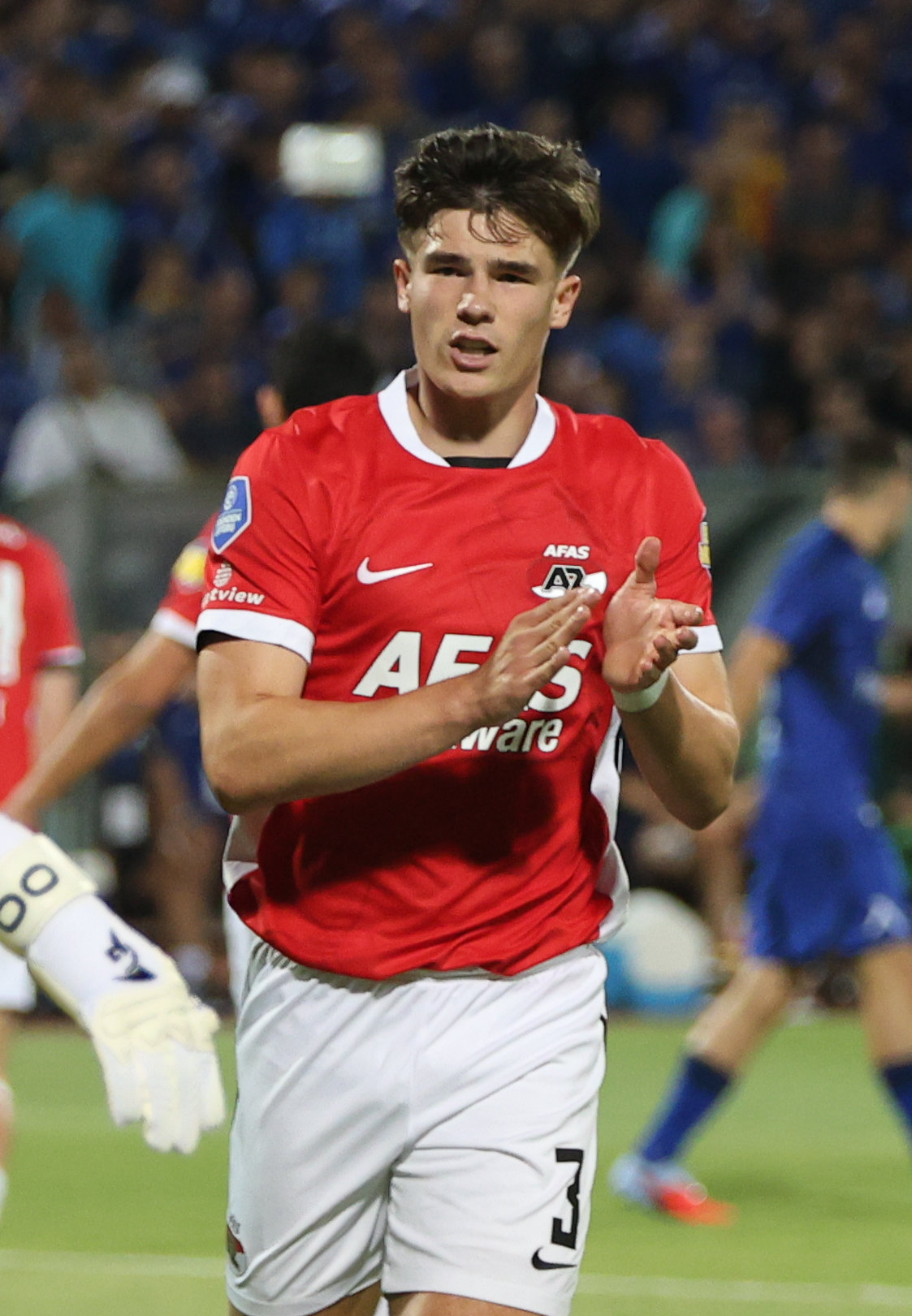
- Goes with AZ in 2025

Personal information
- Full name: Wouter Maarten Goes
- Date of birth: 10 June 2004 (age 22)
- Place of birth: Amsterdam, Netherlands
- Position: Centre-back

Team information
- Current team: AZ
- Number: 3

Youth career
- ASV Arsenal
- –2016: Ajax
- 2016–2021: AZ

Senior career*
Years	Team	Apps	(Gls)
2021–2024	Jong AZ	37	(1)
2023–	AZ	91	(3)

International career^{‡}
2019	Netherlands U15	4	(1)
2019–2020	Netherlands U16	3	(0)
2021–2022	Netherlands U18	5	(1)
2022	Netherlands U19	2	(0)
2024–	Netherlands U21	11	(0)
- * Club domestic league appearances and goals as of 18 October 2026 ‡ National team caps and goals as of 27 March 2026

Wouter Maarten Goes (born 10 June 2004) is a Dutch professional footballer who plays as a centre-back for Eredivisie club AZ. He has represented the Netherlands at youth international level.

== Club career ==
Goes progressed through the AZ academy, having earlier played for Ajax's youth teams, and captained several of AZ's age-group sides. He signed his first professional contract in November 2020, at which point he was captain of the under-17 side.

During the 2021–22 season, Goes was part of the under-19 team that reached the round of 16 of the UEFA Youth League through the Champions Path, eliminating Angers and Villarreal along the way. He made his senior debut for the reserve side Jong AZ on 4 February 2022, starting in a 2–1 Eerste Divisie defeat away to Ajax's reserve team.

Goes made his Eredivisie debut for AZ's senior side on 4 February 2023, starting in a match against Volendam. Three weeks later, on 25 February, he scored his first Eredivisie goal in a 2–1 win over Cambuur. The following season he established himself in the side.

On 21 April 2025 he played in the KNVB Cup final, in which AZ lost to Go Ahead Eagles on penalties after a 1–1 draw.

== International career ==
Goes has represented the Netherlands at under-15 through under-21 level. In March 2024 he played for the Netherlands under-21 team in a 3–0 win over Moldova in a European Under-21 Championship qualifier. The following year he featured for the under-21s in a 2–1 away win over Italy.

== Style of play and reputation ==
Goes is a combative centre-back who models his game on Sergio Ramos, whom he named as his example in a 2024 interview with Voetbal International.

His aggressive, physical style has made him a repeatedly discussed figure in the Eredivisie and has drawn criticism from opponents and pundits. After the 2025 KNVB Cup final, in which AZ lost to Go Ahead Eagles, several pundits and opposing players criticised his on-field conduct; Go Ahead Eagles forward Victor Edvardsen called him "a stupid and nasty guy".

Goes has himself reflected critically on his behaviour. He said he had consulted a sport psychologist to help manage his conduct on the pitch and had become calmer as a result, and said he wanted to move away from the theatrics in his game.

== Career statistics ==
As of match played 18 October 2026

Appearances and goals by club, season and competition
Club	Season	League			KNVB Cup		Europe		Other		Total	
Club	Season	Division	Apps	Goals	Apps	Goals	Apps	Goals	Apps	Goals	Apps	Goals
Jong AZ	2021–22	Eerste Divisie	4	0	–		–		–		4	0
Jong AZ	2022–23	Eerste Divisie	22	1	–		–		–		22	1
Jong AZ	2023–24	Eerste Divisie	11	0	–		–		–		11	0
Jong AZ	Total		37	1	–		–		–		37	1
AZ	2022–23	Eredivisie	8	1	1	0	2 (Note: Appearances in UEFA Europa Conference League)	0	–		11	1
AZ	2023–24	Eredivisie	15	0	2	0	1	0	–		18	0
AZ	2024–25	Eredivisie	26	1	5	1	9 (Note: Appearacnes in UEFA Europa League)	0	2 (Note: Appearances in Eredivisie European play-offs)	0	42	2
AZ	2025–26	Eredivisie	33	1	4	0	16	0	–		53	1
AZ	2026–27	Eredivisie	9	0	0	0	2	0	1 (Note: Appearance in Johan Cruyff Shield)	0	12	0
AZ	Total		91	3	11	1	30	0	1	0	136	4
Career total			130	4	12	1	30	0	3	0	173	5

== Honours ==
AZ

- KNVB Cup: 2025–26
- Johan Cruyff Shield: 2026

Individual

- Eredivisie Talent of the Month: December 2024, May 2025
- Eredivisie Team of the Month: December 2024, May 2025
