= Matias Rale =

Finnish footballer (born 2001)

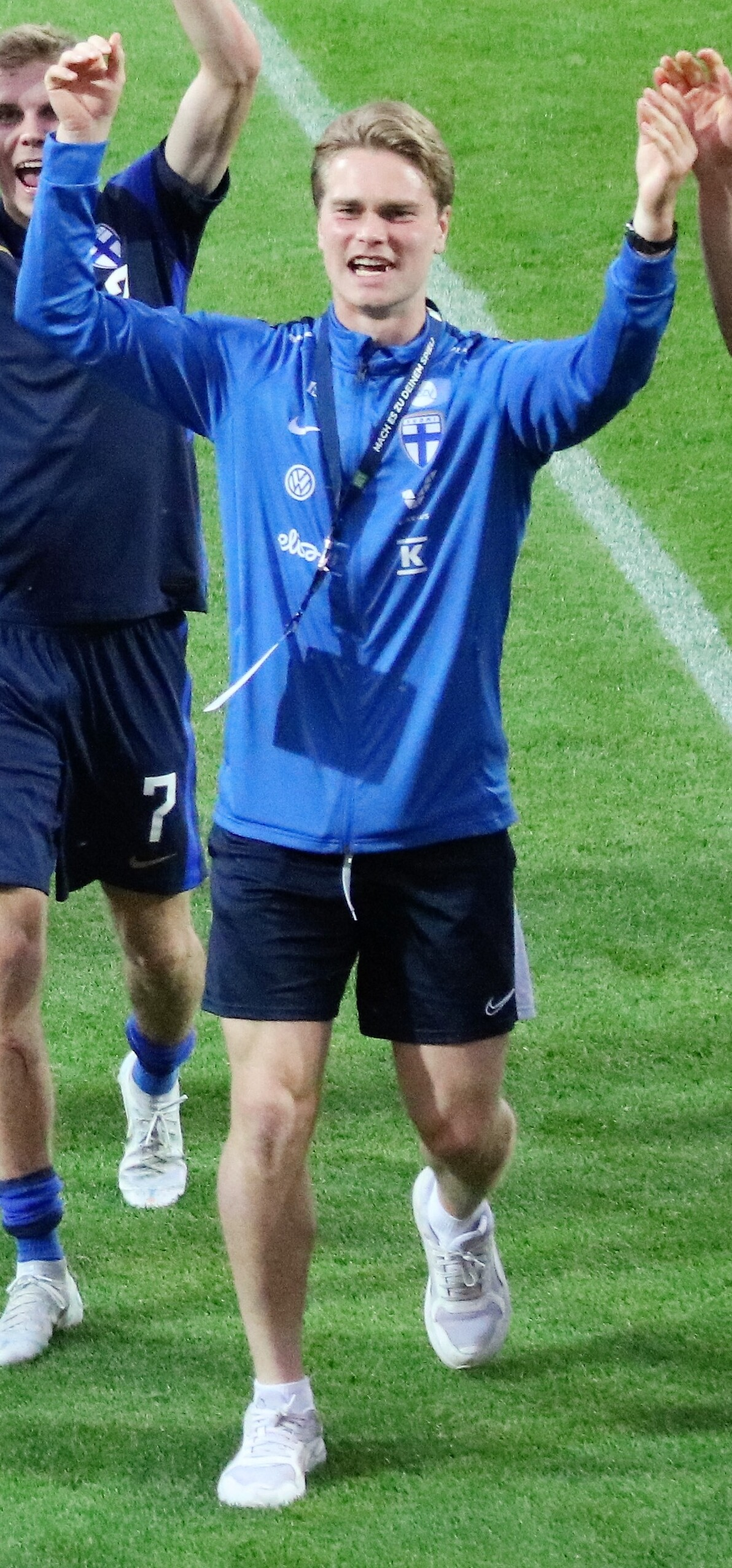
- Rale with Finland U21 in 2022

Personal information
- Full name: Matias Johan Erik Rale
- Date of birth: 4 March 2001 (age 25)
- Place of birth: Vantaa, Finland
- Height: 1.83 m (6 ft 0 in)
- Position: Left back

Team information
- Current team: Ilves
- Number: 3

Youth career
- –2014: TiPS
- 2015–2019: Honka

Senior career*
Years	Team	Apps	(Gls)
2016–2022	Honka II	35	(1)
2021–2023	Honka	61	(3)
2024	Kauno Žalgiris	24	(0)
2025–	Ilves	56	(4)

International career^{‡}
2016–2017	Finland U16	4	(0)
2018	Finland U17	7	(0)
2018	Finland U18	2	(0)
2021–2022	Finland U21	4	(0)
Medal record
Honka
First place	Finnish League Cup	2022
Second place	Finnish Cup	2023
- * Club domestic league appearances and goals as of 13 November 2026 ‡ National team caps and goals as of 7 June 2022

Matias Johan Erik Rale (born 4 March 2001) is a Finnish professional footballer who plays as a left back for Ilves.

== Club career ==
Rale was born in Vantaa, and started playing football with a local club TiPS in Tikkurila.

He joined the Espoo-based FC Honka organisation when aged 14, and made his Veikkausliiga debut with the Honka first team in 2021. For the 2023 season, Rale was named one of the team captains of Honka.

On 15 January 2024, after a surprising bankruptcy of Honka, Rale joined Lithuanian club Kauno Žalgiris in A Lyga. He left the club after the season, after finishing 3rd in the league.

On 23 January 2025, Rale signed a two-year deal with Ilves.

== Career statistics ==
As of 27 July 2026

Appearances and goals by club, season and competition
Club	Season	League			Cup (Note: Includes Suomen Cup and Lithuanian Cup)		League cup		Europe		Total	
Club	Season	Division	Apps	Goals	Apps	Goals	Apps	Goals	Apps	Goals	Apps	Goals
Honka Akatemia	2016	Kolmonen	2	0	–		–		–		2	0
Honka Akatemia	2017	Kolmonen	4	0	–		–		–		4	0
Honka Akatemia	2018	Kakkonen	11	0	–		–		–		11	0
Honka Akatemia	2019	Kakkonen	0	0	–		–		–		0	0
Honka Akatemia	2020	Kakkonen	15	1	3	0	–		–		18	1
Honka Akatemia	2021	Kakkonen	2	0	–		–		–		2	0
Honka Akatemia	2022	Kakkonen	1	0	–		–		–		1	0
Honka Akatemia	Total		35	1	3	0	0	0	0	0	38	1
Honka	2021	Veikkausliiga	13	1	4	0	–		0	0	17	1
Honka	2022	Veikkausliiga	21	2	1	0	5	0	–		27	2
Honka	2023	Veikkausliiga	27	0	5	0	4	0	2 (Note: Includes UEFA Europa Conference League)	0	38	0
Honka	Total		61	3	10	0	9	0	2	0	82	3
Kauno Žalgiris	2024	A Lyga	24	0	3	0	–		–		27	0
Ilves	2025	Veikkausliiga	24	4	1	0	5	0	3 (Note: One appearance in UEFA Europa League, two appearances in UEFA Conference League)	0	33	4
Ilves	2026	Veikkausliiga	15	0	4	0	6	0	3	0	28	0
Ilves	Total		39	4	5	0	11	0	6	0	61	4
Career total			167	8	21	0	20	0	8	0	216	8

== Honours ==
Honka

- Finnish League Cup: 2022
- Finnish Cup runner-up: 2023
