= Ibrahim Sadiq =

Ghanaian footballer (born 2000)

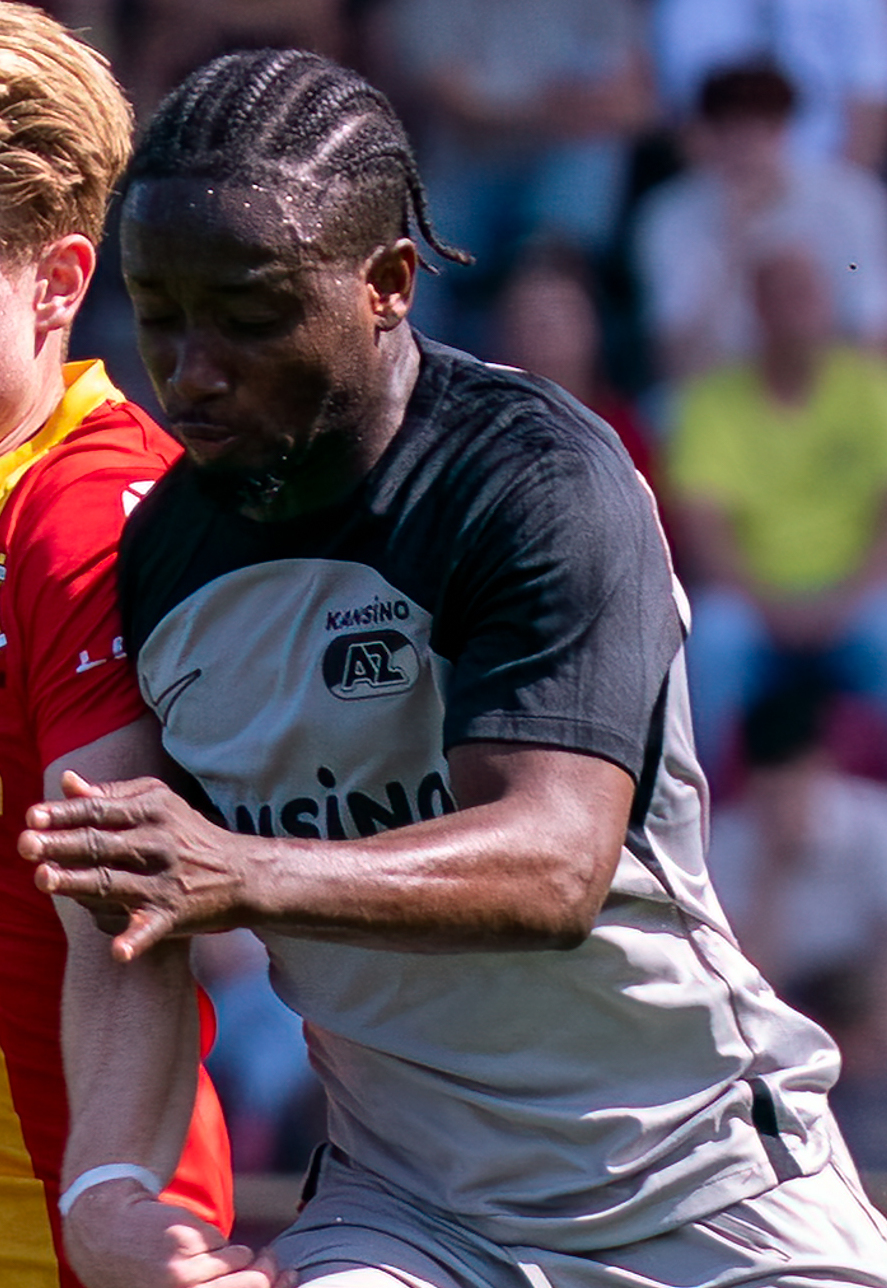
- Sadiq with AZ in 2024

Personal information
- Date of birth: 7 May 2000 (age 26)
- Place of birth: Buduburam, Ghana
- Height: 1.68 m (5 ft 6 in)
- Position: Winger

Team information
- Current team: Colorado Rapids
- Number: 11

Youth career
- –2018: Right to Dream

Senior career*
Years	Team	Apps	(Gls)
2018–2022	Nordsjælland	59	(6)
2022–2023	Häcken	29	(12)
2023–2026	AZ	57	(11)
2026–	Colorado Rapids	0	(0)

International career^{‡}
2017	Ghana U17	4	(1)
2019	Ghana U20	3	(0)
- * Club domestic league appearances and goals as of 22 March 2026 ‡ National team caps and goals as of 13:16, 8 November 2021 (UTC)

Ibrahim Sadiq (born 7 May 2000) is a Ghanaian professional footballer who plays as a winger for Colorado Rapids of Major League Soccer.

== Early life ==
Sadiq was with the Right to Dream Academy before moving to Europe.

== Club career ==
Sadiq made his unofficial debut for FC Nordsjælland on 4 July 2018 in a friendly match against the Belgian team KFCO Beerschot Wilrijk. He scored a goal after 72 minutes, leading to a 3–2 win. Sadiq made his official debut in the Danish Superliga for Nordjsælland on 15 July 2018 when he appeared as a 73rd-minute substitute in a 1–0 win over Esbjerg fB. On 19 July, he made his debut in the UEFA Europa League in the 2–1 home win over Cliftonville.

On 18 February 2022, Sadiq signed a contract with BK Häcken in Sweden until the end of 2025. After a successful period at BK Häcken, Sadiq made the switch to AZ Alkmaar on 1 September 2023, signing a five-year contract.

On 2 September 2026, Sadiq transferred to the Colorado Rapids of Major League Soccer for an undisclosed fee, signing a contract through the 2027-28 season with an option to extend for an additional year.

== International career ==
Sadiq played at the 2017 FIFA U-17 World Cup scoring the match winner and earning the Man of the Match in Ghana's opening day victory against Colombia.

== Career statistics ==
As of match played 15 April 2026

Appearances and goals by club, season and competition
Club	Season	League			National cup (Note: Includes Danish Cup, Svenska Cupen and KNVB Cup)		Continental		Other		Total	
Club	Season	Division	Apps	Goals	Apps	Goals	Apps	Goals	Apps	Goals	Apps	Goals
Nordsjælland	2018–19	Danish Superliga	8	0	1	0	1 (Note: Appearances in UEFA Europa League)	0	—		10	0
Nordsjælland	2019–20	Danish Superliga	26	3	2	0	0	0	—		28	3
Nordsjælland	2020–21	Danish Superliga	19	2	0	0	0	0	—		19	2
Nordsjælland	2021–22	Danish Superliga	6	0	0	0	0	0	—		6	0
Nordsjælland	Total		59	5	3	0	1	0	0	0	63	5
Häcken	2022	Allsvenskan	19	7	6	7	—		—		25	14
Häcken	2023	Allsvenskan	10	5	0	0	8 (Note: Four appearances and three goals in UEFA Champions League, four appearances and five goals in UEFA Europa League)	8	—		18	13
Häcken	Total		29	12	6	7	8	8	0	0	43	27
AZ	2023–24	Eredivisie	16	2	1	0	5 (Note: Appearances in UEFA Europa Conference League)	1	—		22	3
AZ	2024–25	Eredivisie	21	7	1	0	5	0	—		27	7
AZ	2025–26	Eredivisie	20	2	4	2	13	4	—		37	8
AZ	Total		57	11	6	2	23	5	0	0	86	18
Career total			145	28	15	9	32	13	0	0	192	50

== Honours ==
BK Häcken

- Allsvenskan: 2022

AZ

- KNVB Cup: 2025–26

Individual

- Eredivisie Team of the Month: September 2024
