= Denso Kasius =

Dutch footballer (born 2002)

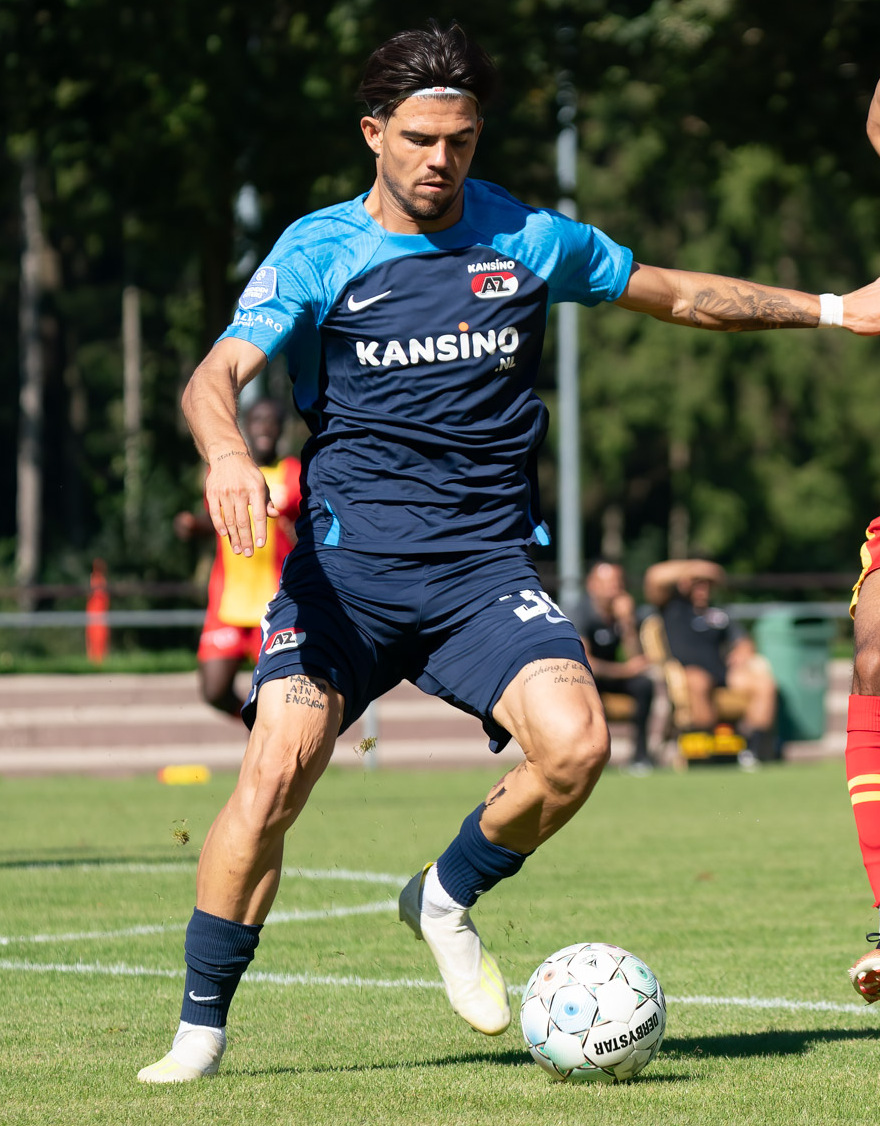
- Kasius with AZ in 2023

Personal information
- Date of birth: 6 October 2002 (age 24)
- Place of birth: Delft, Netherlands
- Height: 1.86 m (6 ft 1 in)
- Position: Defender

Team information
- Current team: AZ Alkmaar
- Number: 30

Youth career
- DHC Delft
- 2011–2013: Sparta Rotterdam
- 2013–2017: Feyenoord
- 2017–2018: ADO Den Haag
- 2018–2021: Utrecht

Senior career*
Years	Team	Apps	(Gls)
2020–2022	Jong Utrecht	7	(0)
2021–2022	→ Volendam (loan)	35	(6)
2022–2023	Bologna	14	(0)
2023	→ Rapid Wien (loan)	10	(0)
2023–	AZ Alkmaar	67	(5)

International career^{‡}
2018	Netherlands U16	1	(0)
- * Club domestic league appearances and goals as of 25 October 2026 ‡ National team caps and goals as of 13:17, 1 June 2020 (UTC)

Denso Kasius (born 6 October 2002) is a Dutch professional footballer who plays as a defender for Eredivisie club AZ.

== Club career ==
In January 2021, Kasius joined FC Volendam on loan.

On 30 January 2022, he signed for Italian club Bologna.

On 26 January 2023, Kasius joined Austrian Bundesliga club Rapid Wien on loan until the end of the season.

On 3 July 2023, Kasius signed a four-year deal to join AZ Alkmaar. He was in the Eredivisie Team of the Month for October 2024.

== Career statistics ==
As of match played 25 October 2026

Appearances and goals by club, season and competition
Club	Season	League			National cup (Note: Includes KNVB Cup)		Europe		Total	
Club	Season	Division	Apps	Goals	Apps	Goals	Apps	Goals	Apps	Goals
Jong FC Utrecht	2019–20	Eerste Divisie	1	0	—		—		1	0
Jong FC Utrecht	2020–21	Eerste Divisie	6	0	—		—		6	0
Jong FC Utrecht	Total		7	0	—		—		7	0
FC Volendam (loan)	2020–21	Eerste Divisie	0	0	0	0	—		0	0
Bologna	2021–22	Serie A	7	0	0	0	—		7	0
Bologna	2022–23	Serie A	7	0	0	0	—		7	0
Bologna	Total		14	0	0	0	—		14	0
Rapid Wien (loan)	2022–23	Austrian Bundesliga	10	0	2	0	—		12	0
AZ	2023–24	Eredivisie	16	0	2	0	4 (Note: Appearances in UEFA Conference League)	0	22	0
AZ	2024–25	Eredivisie	32	3	4	0	9 (Note: Appearances in UEFA Europa League)	2	45	5
AZ	2025–26	Eredivisie	17	2	2	0	10	1	29	3
AZ	2026–27	Eredivisie	2	0	0	0	2	0	4	0
AZ	Total		67	5	8	0	25	3	100	8
Jong AZ	2023–24	Eerste Divisie	3	3	—		—		3	3
Career total			101	8	10	0	25	3	136	11

== Honours ==
AZ

- KNVB Cup: 2025–26
