= Rome-Jayden Owusu-Oduro =

Dutch footballer (born 2004)

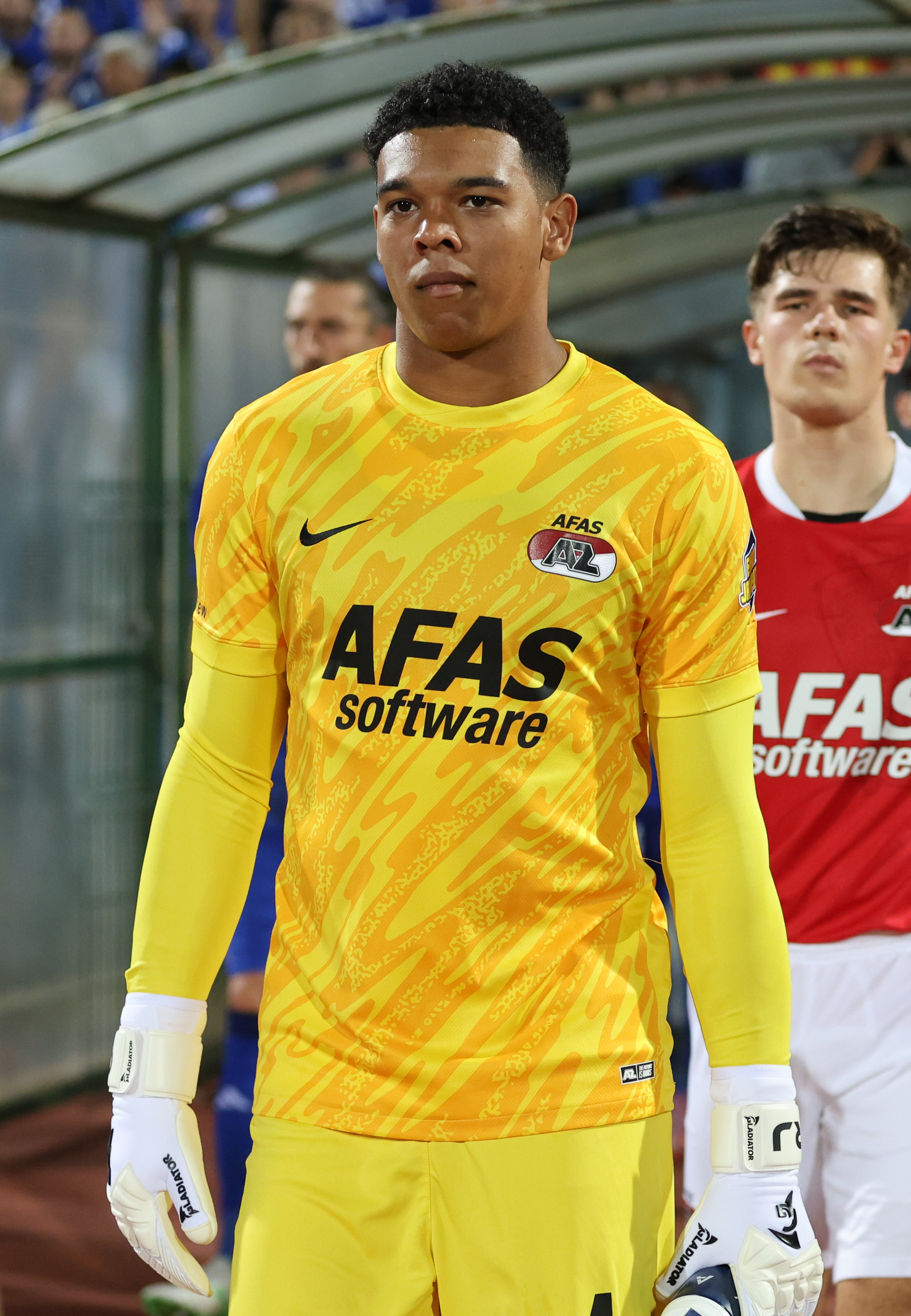

Personal information
- Full name: Rome-Jayden Owusu-Oduro
- Date of birth: 2 July 2004 (age 22)
- Place of birth: Purmerend, Netherlands
- Height: 1.89 m (6 ft 2 in)
- Position: Goalkeeper

Team information
- Current team: AZ
- Number: 1

Youth career
- DVC Buiksloot
- 2015–2022: AZ

Senior career*
| Years | Team | Apps | (Gls) |
| 2022– | Jong AZ | 34 | (0) |
| 2023– | AZ | 57 | (0) |

International career^{‡}
| 2020 | Netherlands U16 | 1 | (0) |
| 2023 | Netherlands U20 | 1 | (0) |
| 2024– | Netherlands U21 | 8 | (0) |
- * Club domestic league appearances and goals as of 17 May 2026 ‡ National team caps and goals as of 21:23, 10 October 2025 (UTC)

Rome-Jayden Owusu-Oduro (born 2 July 2004) is a Dutch professional footballer who plays as a goalkeeper for Eredivisie club AZ.

== Club career ==
Owusu-Oduro moved from DVC Buiksloot to the AZ Alkmaar academy, beginning to play for AZ at under-12 level. After continuing through the age group levels he signed a new professional contract on 8 December 2023 keeping him at AZ until the end of the 2027–28 season. He distinguished himself with critical saves as the AZ under-18 side won a league and cup double in the 2021–22 season.

He had been wildly tipped as a "wonderkid" in the football management video game Football Manager 2022 by football websites such as Planet Football.

=== Jong AZ ===
Owusu-Oduro made his Eerste Divisie debut on 26 August 2022 against FC Eindhoven. On 21 April 2023, he saved two penalties in a penalty shoot-out as AZ won through against Sporting Lisbon to reach the final of the 2022-23 UEFA Youth League. He also started in the final against Hajduk Split as AZ ran out 5–0 winners.

=== AZ ===
On 14 December 2023, Owusu-Oduro made his first team debut in a UEFA Europa Conference League away fixture against Legia Warsaw. He played in the final of the KNVB Cup as AZ lost to Go Ahead Eagles on penalties on 21 April 2025. The game had ended 1–1 in normal time after Go Ahead Eagles scored a 98th-minute equaliser.

== International career ==
On 25 March 2023, Owusu-Oduro played for the Netherlands national under-20 football team in a 2–1 friendly win over France.

== Personal life ==
Owusu-Oduro has Ghanaian roots, and was born to a Ghanaian father and Dutch mother, making him eligible to represent Ghana at senior level.

== Career statistics ==
As of match played 17 May 2026

Appearances and goals by club, season and competition
| Club | Season | League | | | KNVB Cup | | Europe | | Other | | Total | |
| Club | Season | Division | Apps | Goals | Apps | Goals | Apps | Goals | Apps | Goals | Apps | Goals |
|---|---|---|---|---|---|---|---|---|---|---|---|---|
| Jong AZ | 2022–23 | Eerste Divisie | 14 | 0 | — | | — | | — | | 14 | 0 |
| Jong AZ | 2023–24 | Eerste Divisie | 17 | 0 | — | | — | | — | | 17 | 0 |
| Jong AZ | 2024–25 | Eerste Divisie | 2 | 0 | — | | — | | — | | 2 | 0 |
| Jong AZ | Total | | 33 | 0 | — | | — | | — | | 33 | 0 |
| AZ | 2023–24 | Eredivisie | 4 | 0 | 2 | 0 | 1 (Note: Appearances in UEFA Conference League) | 0 | — | | 7 | 0 |
| AZ | 2024–25 | Eredivisie | 30 | 0 | 4 | 0 | 11 (Note: Appearances in UEFA Europa League) | 0 | — | | 45 | 0 |
| AZ | 2025–26 | Eredivisie | 23 | 0 | 5 | 0 | 10 | 0 | — | | 38 | 0 |
| AZ | Total | | 57 | 0 | 11 | 0 | 22 | 0 | — | | 90 | 0 |
| Career total | | | 90 | 0 | 11 | 0 | 22 | 0 | 0 | 0 | 123 | 0 |

== Honours ==
AZ

- KNVB Cup: 2025–26
- Johan Cruyff Shield: 2026
