= Kasper Boogaard =

Dutch footballer (born 2006)

Personal information
- Date of birth: 29 January 2006 (age 20)
- Place of birth: Den Burg, Netherlands
- Height: 1.87 m (6 ft 2 in)
- Position: Midfielder

Team information
- Current team: Willem II (on loan from AZ Alkmaar)
- Number: 8

Youth career
- –2017: Texel '94
- 2017–2025: AZ Alkmaar

Senior career*
| Years | Team | Apps | (Gls) |
| 2023– | Jong AZ | 41 | (4) |
| 2025– | AZ Alkmaar | 11 | (0) |
| 2026– | → Willem II (loan) | 6 | (0) |

International career^{‡}
| 2025 | Netherlands U19 | 6 | (0) |
Medal record
Men's football
Representing Netherlands
UEFA European Under-19 Championship
| Winner | 2025 Romania |
- * Club domestic league appearances and goals as of 3 October 2026 ‡ National team caps and goals as of 26 June 2025

Kasper Boogaard (born 29 January 2006) is a Dutch professional footballer who plays as a midfielder for Eredivisie club Willem II, on loan from AZ Alkmaar. He is a Dutch youth international.

== Club career ==
From Texel in North Holland, he played for Texel '94 prior to his move into the academy of AZ Alkmaar in 2017. He signed a first contract with the club in 2022. He featured for the club in the semifinal of the UEFA Youth League in April 2025, and signed a new four-year professional contract with the club that summer.

Having played for Jong AZ in the Eerste Divisie, he made his debut for the senior AZ Alkmaar team in the UEFA Conference League against Premier League club Crystal Palace on 6 November 2025. Boogaard was named to make his first start in the Eredivisie against PSV Eindhoven on 9 November 2025.

On 23 July 2026, Boogaard moved on loan to Willem II.

== International career ==
He was part of the Netherlands U19s that won the 2025 UEFA European Under-19 Championship.

== Career statistics ==
As of match played 17 May 2026

Appearances and goals by club, season and competition
| Club | Season | League | | | KNVB Cup | | Europe | | Other | | Total | |
| Club | Season | Division | Apps | Goals | Apps | Goals | Apps | Goals | Apps | Goals | Apps | Goals |
|---|---|---|---|---|---|---|---|---|---|---|---|---|
| Jong AZ | 2023–24 | Eerste Divisie | 1 | 0 | — | | — | | — | | 1 | 0 |
| Jong AZ | 2024–25 | Eerste Divisie | 17 | 0 | — | | — | | — | | 17 | 0 |
| Jong AZ | 2025–26 | Eerste Divisie | 23 | 4 | — | | — | | — | | 23 | 4 |
| Jong AZ | Total | | 41 | 4 | — | | — | | — | | 41 | 4 |
| AZ | 2025–26 | Eredivisie | 11 | 0 | 2 | 0 | 4 (Note: Appearances in UEFA Conference League) | 0 | — | | 17 | 0 |
| Career total | | | 52 | 4 | 2 | 0 | 4 | 0 | 0 | 0 | 58 | 4 |

== Honours ==
AZ

- KNVB Cup: 2025–26

Netherlands U19

- UEFA European Under-19 Championship: 2025
