= Mateo Chávez =

Mexican footballer (born 2004)

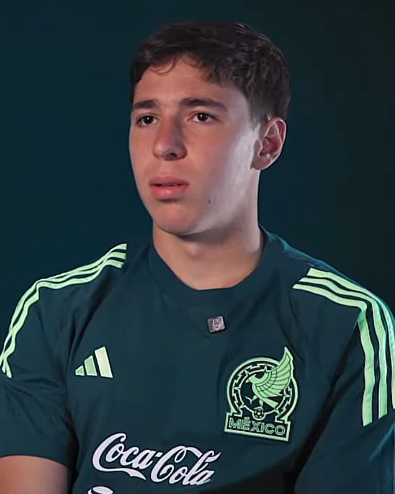
- Chávez with Mexico in 2025

Personal information
- Full name: Mateo Chávez García
- Date of birth: 12 May 2004 (age 22)
- Place of birth: San Pedro Garza García, Nuevo León, Mexico
- Height: 1.77 m (5 ft 10 in)
- Position: Left-back

Team information
- Current team: AZ
- Number: 5

Youth career
- 2019–2022: Guadalajara

Senior career*
Years	Team	Apps	(Gls)
2022–2024	Tapatío	39	(2)
2024–2025	Guadalajara	37	(0)
2025–	AZ	30	(2)

International career^{‡}
2024	Mexico U23	2	(1)
2025–	Mexico	15	(1)
Medal record
Men's football
Representing Mexico
CONCACAF Gold Cup
Winner	2025 United States–Canada
- * Club domestic league appearances and goals as of 25 October 2026 ‡ National team caps and goals as of 17 November 2026

Mateo Chávez García (born 12 May 2004) is a Mexican professional footballer who plays as a left-back for Eredivisie club AZ Alkmaar and the Mexico national team.

== Club career ==
=== Guadalajara ===
Chávez made his professional debut with Guadalajara reserve club Tapatío on 29 September 2022, coming on as a 60th-minute substitute against Venados.

Chávez made his first team Liga MX debut on 13 January 2024, in a 1–1 draw against Santos Laguna. On 7 February 2024, Chávez made his CONCACAF Champions Cup debut in a 3–1 win against Forge.

=== AZ ===
On 15 May 2025, Chávez signed for Dutch club AZ Alkmaar on a four-year agreement with a transfer fee of €2 million for 75% of Chavez's rights while Guadalajara retains the other 25%. On 10 August, he made his Eredivisie debut, providing an assist, in a 4–1 victory against Groningen.

On 17 May 2026, Chávez scored his first goal for the club, the second for his side in a 3–3 draw against NAC Breda.

On 2 August, Chávez was in the starting eleven of Johan Cruyff Shield against PSV Eindhoven as AZ won the match 4–0, winning the club's second Dutch Super Cup.

== International career ==
In March 2024, Mexico under-23 team coach Ricardo Cadena included Chávez in the roster for friendlies against Argentina.

In June 2025, Chávez was included in Javier Aguirre's roster for the Gold Cup.

Chávez was named in the 26-man squad for the 2026 FIFA World Cup, hosted on home soil. On 24 June, he scored his first international goal and was named Man of the Match in a 3–0 victory over Czech Republic in the third group-stage match of the World Cup.

== Personal life ==
Chávez is the son of former professional footballer Paulo Chávez.

== Career statistics ==
=== Club ===
As of match played on 25 October 2026

Appearances and goals by club, season and competition
Club	Season	League			National cup		Continental		Other		Total	
Club	Season	Division	Apps	Goals	Apps	Goals	Apps	Goals	Apps	Goals	Apps	Goals
Tapatío	2022–23	Liga de Expansión MX	27	0	—		—		2 (Note: Appearances in Campeón de Campeones)	0	29	0
Tapatío	2023–24	Liga de Expansión MX	12	2	—		—		—		12	2
Tapatío	Total		39	2	—		—		2	0	41	2
Guadalajara	2023–24	Liga MX	11	0	—		2 (Note: Appearances in CONCACAF Champions Cup)	0	—		13	0
Guadalajara	2024–25	Liga MX	26	0	—		3	0	2 (Note: Appearances in Leagues Cup)	0	31	0
Guadalajara	Total		37	0	—		5	0	2	0	44	0
AZ	2025–26	Eredivisie	20	1	3	0	9 (Note: Appearances in UEFA Conference League)	0	—		32	1
AZ	2026–27	Eredivisie	10	1	0	0	2 (Note: Appearances in UEFA Europa League)	0	1 (Note: Appearance in Johan Cruyff Shield)	0	13	1
AZ	Total		30	2	3	0	11	0	1	0	45	2
Career total			105	4	3	0	16	0	5	0	129	4

=== International ===
As of match played on 17 November 2026

Appearances and goals by national team and year
National team	Year	Apps	Goals
Mexico	2025	7	0
Mexico	2026	8	1
Total		15	1

Scores and results list Mexico's goal tally first, score column indicates score after each Chávez goal.

List of international goals scored by Mateo Chávez
No.	Date	Venue	Cap	Opponent	Score	Result	Competition
1	24 June 2026	Estadio Azteca, Mexico City, Mexico	11	Czech Republic	1–0	3–0	2026 FIFA World Cup

== Honours ==
Tapatío

- Liga de Expansión MX: Clausura 2023
- Campeón de Campeones: 2022–23

AZ Alkmaar

- KNVB Cup: 2025–26
- Johan Cruyff Shield: 2026

Mexico

- CONCACAF Gold Cup: 2025

Individual

- IFFHS CONCACAF Youth (U20) Best XI: 2024
- Eredivisie Goal of the Month: August 2026
