= Peer Koopmeiners =

Dutch footballer (born 2000)

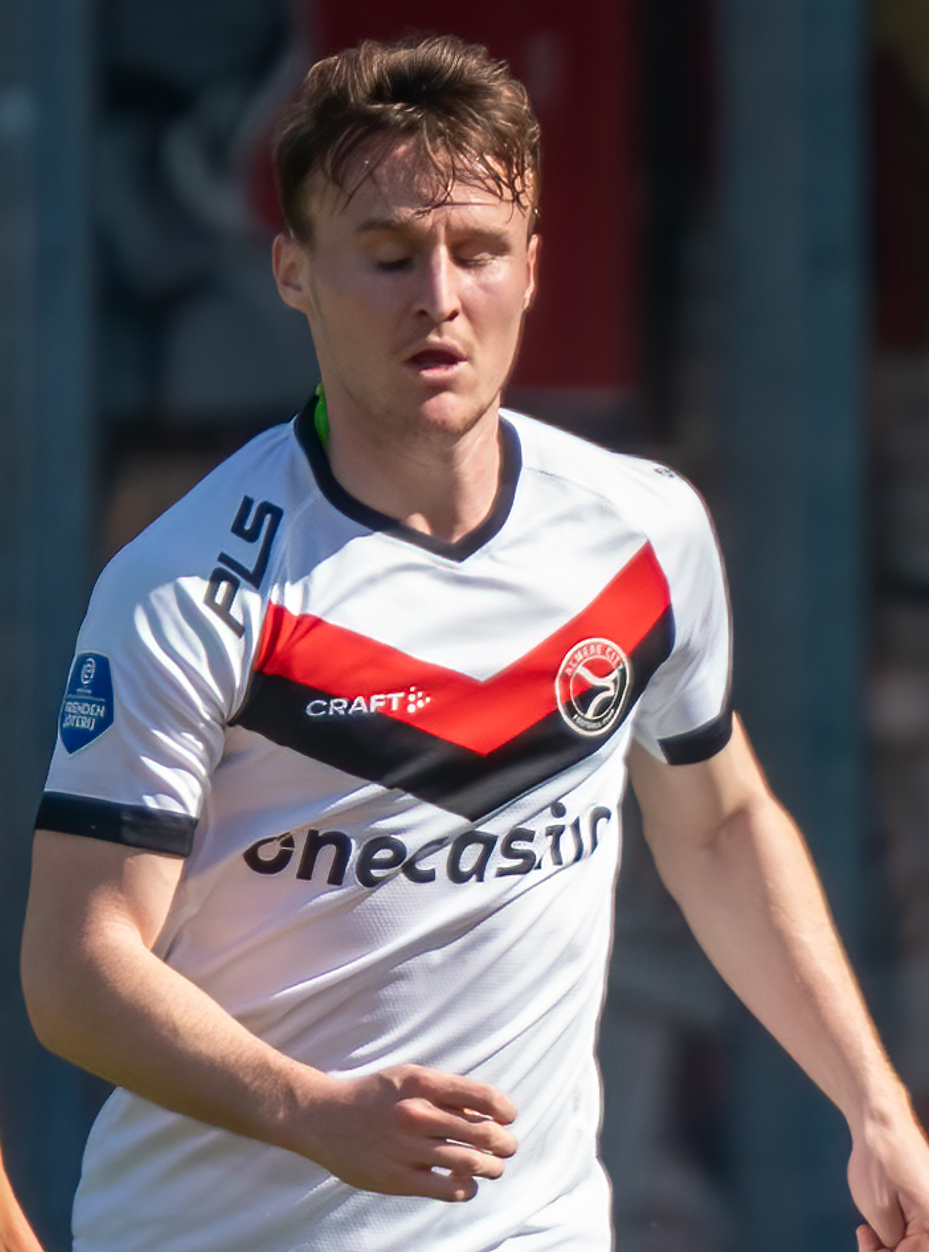
- Koopmeiners in 2024 with Almere City

Personal information
- Date of birth: 4 May 2000 (age 26)
- Place of birth: Amsterdam, Netherlands
- Height: 1.86 m (6 ft 1 in)
- Position: Defensive midfielder

Team information
- Current team: AZ
- Number: 6

Youth career
- AZ Alkmaar

Senior career*
Years	Team	Apps	(Gls)
2018–2022	Jong AZ	115	(4)
2021–	AZ	97	(4)
2023	→ Excelsior (loan)	19	(0)
2023–2024	→ Almere City (loan)	31	(0)

International career
2014	Netherlands U15	1	(0)
2015–2016	Netherlands U16	7	(0)
2018–2019	Netherlands U19	6	(0)
- * Club domestic league appearances and goals as of 25 October 2026

Peer Koopmeiners (born 4 May 2000) is a Dutch professional footballer who plays as a defensive midfielder for Eredivisie club AZ.

== Club career ==
On 17 October 2020, Koopmeiners netted his first professional goal, in a 3–2 away defeat at the hands of Jong Ajax. On 2 February 2021, he scored a bullet free-kick that helped Jong AZ to a 3–2 victory against fellow second-tier side FC Eindhoven.

On 23 June 2021, he was promoted into the first team. On 10 January 2023, Koopmeiners was loaned by Excelsior. On 18 July 2023, he moved on a new loan to Almere City.

He scored his first goal for AZ in a 2–1 away win over Sparta Rotterdam on 24 November 2024. On 11 August 2026, he extended his contract with AZ until 2029.

== Personal life ==
He is the younger brother of Dutch international Teun Koopmeiners.

== Career statistics ==
As of match played 25 October 2026

Appearances and goals by club, season and competition
Club	Season	League			KNVB Cup		Europe		Other		Total	
Club	Season	Division	Apps	Goals	Apps	Goals	Apps	Goals	Apps	Goals	Apps	Goals
Jong AZ	2017–18	Eerste Divisie	1	0	–		–		–		1	0
Jong AZ	2018–19	Eerste Divisie	19	0	–		–		–		19	0
Jong AZ	2019–20	Eerste Divisie	24	0	–		–		–		24	0
Jong AZ	2020–21	Eerste Divisie	34	3	–		–		–		34	3
Jong AZ	2021–22	Eerste Divisie	30	1	–		–		–		30	1
Jong AZ	2022–23	Eerste Divisie	7	0	–		–		–		7	0
Jong AZ	Total		115	4	–		–		–		115	4
AZ Alkmaar	2021–22	Eredivisie	3	0	1	0	0	0	1 (Note: Appearance in Eredivisie European play-offs)	0	5	0
AZ Alkmaar	2022–23	Eredivisie	19	0	0	0	3 (Note: Appearances in UEFA Conference League)	0	0	0	22	0
AZ Alkmaar	2024–25	Eredivisie	36	1	4	0	12 (Note: Appearances in UEFA Europa League)	1	–		52	2
AZ Alkmaar	2025–26	Eredivisie	29	2	5	2	16	0	—		50	4
AZ Alkmaar	2026–27	Eredivisie	10	1	0	0	3	1	1 (Note: Appearance in Johan Cruyff Shield)	0	14	2
AZ Alkmaar	Total		97	4	10	2	34	2	2	0	143	8
Excelsior (loan)	2022–23	Eredivisie	19	0	1	0	–		–		20	0
Almere City (loan)	2023–24	Eredivisie	31	0	3	0	–		–		34	0
Career total			262	8	14	2	34	2	2	0	312	12

== Honours ==
AZ

- KNVB Cup: 2025–26
- Johan Cruyff Shield: 2026
