= Seiya Maikuma =

Japanese footballer

Seiya Maikuma 毎熊 晟矢
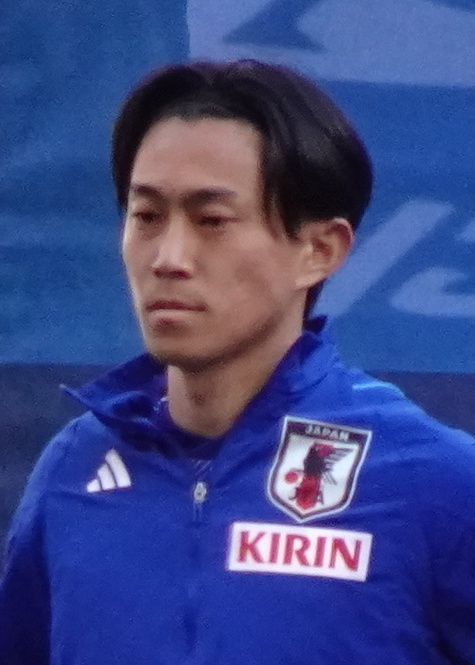
- Maikuma with Japan in 2024

Personal information
- Date of birth: 16 October 1997 (age 29)
- Place of birth: Nagasaki, Japan
- Height: 1.79 m (5 ft 10 in)
- Position: Right-back

Team information
- Current team: AZ
- Number: 2

Youth career
- Kurokami FC
- JFC Rainbow Nagasaki
- FC Bristol
- 2013–2015: Higashi Fukuoka High School

College career
Years	Team	Apps	(Gls)
2016–2019	Momoyama Gakuin University		

Senior career*
Years	Team	Apps	(Gls)
2020–2021	V-Varen Nagasaki	74	(6)
2022–2024	Cerezo Osaka	74	(4)
2024–	AZ	40	(0)

International career^{‡}
2023–2024	Japan	8	(0)
- * Club domestic league appearances and goals as of 20 September 2026 ‡ National team caps and goals as of 3 February 2024

Seiya Maikuma (毎熊 晟矢, Maikuma Seiya; born 16 October 1997) is a Japanese professional footballer who plays as a right-back for Eredivisie club AZ.

== Club career ==
=== V-Varen Nagasaki ===
On 16 October 2019, Maikuma was promoted to the first team for the 2020 season. He made his league debut against Tochigi on 23 February 2020. Maikuma scored his first league goal against Ryukyu on 15 July 2020, scoring in the 40th minute.

=== Cerezo Osaka ===
On 23 December 2021, Maikuma was announced at Cerezo Osaka. On 9 December 2022, Maikuma, along with Satoki Uejo and Tokuma Suzuki, had their contracts renewed. On 23 April 2023, Maikuma scored against Kashiwa Reysol in the 23rd minute.

In 2023, Maikuma was part of the 2023 J1 League Best XI.

=== AZ ===
On 21 June 2024, Maikuma joined Eredivisie side AZ on a four-year deal.

== International career ==
In August 2023, Maikuma received his first call-up to the Japan senior national team by head coach Hajime Moriyasu, for two friendly matches against Germany and Turkey. On 12 September 2023, he made his international debut in a friendly match against Turkey.

On 1 January 2024, Maikuma was named in the Japan squad for the 2023 AFC Asian Cup.

== Career statistics ==
=== Club ===
As of match played 22 October 2026

Appearances and goals by club, season and competition
Club	Season	League			National cup (Note: Includes Emperor's Cup, KNVB Cup)		League cup (Note: Includes J.League Cup)		Continental		Other		Total	
Club	Season	Division	Apps	Goals	Apps	Goals	Apps	Goals	Apps	Goals	Apps	Goals	Apps	Goals
V-Varen Nagasaki	2020	J2 League	36	3	0	0	–		–		–		36	3
V-Varen Nagasaki	2021	J2 League	38	3	1	1	–		–		–		39	4
V-Varen Nagasaki	Total		74	6	1	1	–		–		–		75	7
Cerezo Osaka	2022	J1 League	28	3	3	0	11	1	–		–		42	4
Cerezo Osaka	2023	J1 League	31	1	2	0	3	0	–		–		36	1
Cerezo Osaka	2024	J1 League	15	0	0	0	2	0	–		–		17	0
Cerezo Osaka	Total		74	4	5	0	16	1	–		–		95	5
AZ	2024–25	Eredivisie	28	0	3	0	–		12 (Note: Appearances in UEFA Europa League)	2	–		44	2
AZ	2025–26	Eredivisie	7	0	1	0	–		2 (Note: Appearances in UEFA Conference League)	0	–		10	0
AZ	2026–27	Eredivisie	5	0	0	0	–		2	0	1 (Note: Appearance in Johan Cruyff Shield)	0	8	0
AZ	Total		40	0	4	0	–		16	2	1	0	62	2
Career total			188	10	10	1	16	1	16	2	1	0	232	14

=== International ===
As of matches played 9 February 2024.

Appearances and goals by national team and year
National team	Year	Apps	Goals
Japan	2023	3	0
Japan	2024	5	0
Total		8	0

== Honours ==
AZ

- KNVB Cup: 2025–26
- Johan Cruyff Shield: 2026

Individual

- J.League Best XI: 2023
- Eredivisie Team of the Season: 2024–25
