= Mees de Wit =

Dutch footballer (born 1998)

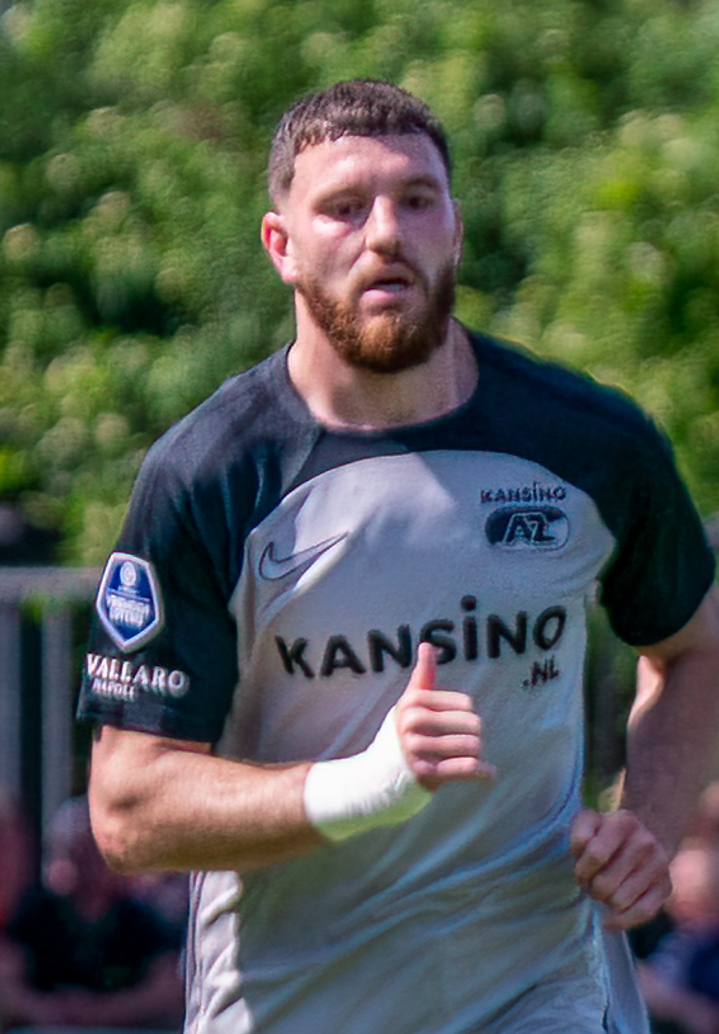
- de Wit with AZ in 2024

Personal information
- Date of birth: 17 April 1998 (age 28)
- Place of birth: Amsterdam, Netherlands
- Height: 1.78 m (5 ft 10 in)
- Position: Left-back

Team information
- Current team: AZ
- Number: 34

Youth career
- FC Weesp
- 2015–2017: AFC Ajax

Senior career*
Years	Team	Apps	(Gls)
2017–2018	Jong Ajax	5	(0)
2018–2021	Sporting B	24	(2)
2020	→ Orihuela (loan)	1	(0)
2021–2022	PEC Zwolle	28	(4)
2022–	AZ	81	(7)

International career
2013–2014	Netherlands U16	4	(0)
2014	Netherlands U17	2	(0)
- * Club domestic league appearances and goals as of 18 October 2026

Mees de Wit (born 17 April 1998) is a Dutch professional footballer who plays as a left-back for Eredivisie club AZ Alkmaar.

== Career ==
De Wit made his Eerste Divisie debut for Jong Ajax on 25 August 2017 in a game against Fortuna Sittard. He signed for Sporting's U-23 team for the 2018–19 season on 19 July 2018. On 11 March 2019, Stefano van Delden, De Wit's agent in 2017 and 2018, made the news as he was suspected of threatening different members of the Ajax board on several occasions during the period from 26 October 2017 to 25 September 2018.

On 20 January 2020, de Wit moved to Spanish club Orihuela on loan for the rest of the season.

On 6 July 2021, he returned to the Netherlands and signed a contract with PEC Zwolle for two years.

De Wit performed exceptionally while playing for PEC Zwolle, leading to a five-year contract with AZ Alkmaar starting in July 2022.

== Career statistics ==
As of match played 22 October 2026

Appearances and goals by club, season and competition
Club	Season	League			National cup (Note: Includes KNVB Cup)		Europe		Other		Total	
Club	Season	Division	Apps	Goals	Apps	Goals	Apps	Goals	Apps	Goals	Apps	Goals
Jong Ajax	2017–18	Eerste Divisie	5	0	—		—		—		5	0
Orihuela	2019–20	Segunda División B	1	0	—		—		—		1	0
Sporting CP B	2020–21	Campeonato de Portugal	24	2	—		—		—		24	2
PEC Zwolle	2021–22	Eredivisie	28	4	3	0	—		—		31	4
AZ	2022–23	Eredivisie	22	2	2	0	11 (Note: Appearances in UEFA Conference League)	1	—		35	3
AZ	2023–24	Eredivisie	10	1	0	0	1	0	—		11	1
AZ	2024–25	Eredivisie	14	1	1	0	4 (Note: Appearances in UEFA Europa League)	0	—		19	1
AZ	2025–26	Eredivisie	31	3	5	1	16	1	—		52	5
AZ	2026–27	Eredivisie	4	0	0	0	2	0	1 (Note: Appearance in Johan Cruyff Shield)	0	7	0
AZ	Total		81	7	8	1	34	2	1	0	124	10
Career total			139	13	11	1	34	1	1	0	185	15

== Honours ==
AZ

- KNVB Cup: 2025–26
- Johan Cruyff Shield: 2026
