= Jong AZ =

Association football club in the Netherlands

- Full name: Jong Alkmaar Zaanstreek
- Founded: 10 May 1967; 59 years ago
- Ground: Sportcomplex Kalverhoek
- Capacity: 1,000
- Manager: Frank Peereboom
- League: Eerste Divisie
- 2025–26: Eerste Divisie, 17th of 20
- Website: az.nl
Home colours	Away colours

Jong AZ is a Dutch association football team, based in Wijdewormer in the Zaanstreek. It is the reserve team of AZ, based in Alkmaar, and plays in the Eerste Divisie.

== Squad ==
As of 14 August 2026

Note: Flags indicate national team as defined under FIFA eligibility rules; some limited exceptions apply. Players may hold more than one non-FIFA nationality.

No.	Pos.	Nation	Player
—	GK	CUW	Kiyani Zeggen
—	GK	NED	Koen Schilder
—	GK	NED	Nick Homan
—	GK	NED	Ismail Ka
—	DF	NED	Jesper Zwart
—	DF	NED	Kiani Inge
—	DF	NED	Rayan Atikallah
—	DF	NED	Mathijs Menu
—	DF	NED	Kevin van Ouytsel
—	DF	NED	Iain de Jongh
—	DF	DEN	Frej Elkjær Andersen
—	DF	NED	Jeremiah Esajas
—	DF	NED	Saviola Simons
—	MF	UKR	Bogdan Budko

No.	Pos.	Nation	Player
—	MF	NED	Hessel de Wit
—	MF	NED	Julian Sijbrands
—	MF	NED	Julian Oerip
—	MF	ISL	Tómas Johannessen
—	MF	NED	Rick Luijer
—	MF	NED	Enoch Mastoras
—	MF	NED	Rio Robbemond
—	FW	NED	Jasper Hartog
—	FW	NED	Yoël van den Ban
—	FW	NED	Kevin Toppenberg
—	FW	NED	Tycho de Wit
—	FW	NED	Melle Roede
—	FW	CUW	Jerolldino Bergraaf (on loan from Excelsior)
—	FW	SWE	Maximilian Ibrahimović
