= 2020–21 AZ Alkmaar season =

AZ Alkmaar
2020–21 season
- Executive director Technical director: Robert Eenhoorn; Max Huiberts
- Chairman: René Neelissen
- Manager: Arne Slot (until 4 December); Pascal Jansen (from 4 December)
- Stadium: AFAS Stadion
- Eredivisie: 3rd
- KNVB Cup: Round of 16
- UEFA Champions League: Third qualifying round
- UEFA Europa League: Group stage
- Top goalscorer: League: Myron Boadu (15); All: Myron Boadu (15)
Home colours	Away colours	Third colours

The 2020–21 AZ Alkmaar season was the club's 54th season in existence and the 23rd consecutive season in the top flight of Dutch football. In addition to the domestic league, AZ participated in this season's editions of the KNVB Cup, the UEFA Champions League and the UEFA Europa League. The season covered the period from 1 July 2020 to 30 June 2021.

On 5 December 2020, manager Arne Slot was sacked following rumors that he was negotiating to become the new manager of Feyenoord for the following season.

== Players ==
=== First-team squad ===
Note: Flags indicate national team as defined under FIFA eligibility rules; some limited exceptions apply. Players may hold more than one non-FIFA nationality.

No.	Pos.	Nation	Player
1	GK	NED	Marco Bizot
2	DF	NOR	Jonas Svensson
3	DF	GRE	Pantelis Chatzidiakos
5	DF	NED	Owen Wijndal
6	MF	NOR	Fredrik Midtsjø
7	FW	NED	Calvin Stengs
8	MF	NED	Teun Koopmeiners (captain)
9	FW	NED	Myron Boadu
10	MF	NED	Dani de Wit
11	FW	SWE	Jesper Karlsson
15	DF	NED	Bruno Martins Indi (on loan from Stoke City)
16	GK	NED	Hobie Verhulst

No.	Pos.	Nation	Player
17	FW	MAR	Zakaria Aboukhlal
18	MF	NOR	Håkon Evjen
20	MF	NED	Jordy Clasie
21	MF	NED	Kenzo Goudmijn
22	DF	NED	Timo Letschert
23	MF	NED	Mohamed Taabouni
24	MF	NED	Tijjani Reijnders
26	DF	JPN	Yukinari Sugawara
27	DF	NED	Ramon Leeuwin
28	FW	ISL	Albert Guðmundsson
30	GK	NED	Mees Bakker

=== Out on loan ===
Note: Flags indicate national team as defined under FIFA eligibility rules; some limited exceptions apply. Players may hold more than one non-FIFA nationality.

No.	Pos.	Nation	Player
—	GK	NED	Rody de Boer (at De Graafschap until 30 June 2021)
—	FW	NED	Ferdy Druijf (at KV Mechelen until 30 June 2021)
—	DF	NED	Joris Kramer (at SC Cambuur until 30 June 2021)

No.	Pos.	Nation	Player
—	MF	NED	Thijs Oosting (at RKC until 30 June 2021)
—	DF	NED	Thomas Ouwejan (at Udinese Calcio until 30 June 2021)
—	GK	NED	Jasper Schendelaar (at Telstar until 30 June 2021)

=== Other players under contract ===
Note: Flags indicate national team as defined under FIFA eligibility rules; some limited exceptions apply. Players may hold more than one non-FIFA nationality.

No.	Pos.	Nation	Player
—	FW	NED	Jeremy Helmer

== Transfers ==
=== In ===
No.	Pos	Player	Transferred from	Fee	Date	Source
11	FW	(Sweden) Jesper Karlsson	(Sweden) Elfsborg	Undisclosed	11 September 2020	
15	DF	(Netherlands) Bruno Martins Indi	(England) Stoke City	Loan	6 October 2020	

=== Out ===
No.	Pos	Player	Transferred to	Fee	Date	Source
15			TBD		1 July 2020	

== Pre-season and friendlies ==
Win Draw Loss

25 July 2020 Friendly	AZ (Netherlands)	0–1	(Belgium) Genk	Alkmaar, Netherlands
12:00 CEST (UTC+2)		Report	Dessers 19' (pen.)	Stadium: AFAS Stadion; Attendance: 0

1 August 2020 Friendly	FC Utrecht (Netherlands)	1–0	(Netherlands) AZ	Utrecht, Netherlands
17:30 CEST (UTC+2)	Gustafson 10'	Report		Stadium: Stadion Galgenwaard; Attendance: 0 Referee: Björn Kuipers

5 August 2020 Friendly	AZ (Netherlands)	0–1	(Netherlands) PEC Zwolle	Epe, Netherlands
19:00 CEST (UTC+2)		Report	Flemming 68'	Stadium: Sportpark De Wachtelenberg; Attendance: 0

8 August 2020 Friendly	AZ (Netherlands)	2–1	(France) Lille	Alkmaar, Netherlands
15:30 CEST (UTC+2)	Sugawara 73'; Ouwejan 84'	Report	Pied 58'	Stadium: AFAS Stadion; Attendance: 0 Referee: Jaafar Aaffouallah

15 August 2020 Friendly	AZ (Netherlands)	0–2	(France) Monaco	Alkmaar, Netherlands
18:00 CEST (UTC+2)		Report	Golovin 20'; Ben Yedder 73'	Stadium: AFAS Stadion; Attendance: 0 Referee: Kevin Puts

20 August 2020 Friendly	AZ (Netherlands)	Cancelled	(Netherlands) Fortuna Sittard	Alkmaar, Netherlands
16:30 CEST (UTC+2)		Report		Stadium: AFAS Stadion

29 August 2020 Friendly	ADO Den Haag (Netherlands)	1–0	(Netherlands) AZ	The Hague, Netherlands
17:30 CEST (UTC+2)	Arweiler 45'	Report		Stadium: Cars Jeans Stadion; Attendance: 0 Referee: Jochem Kamphuis

3 September 2020 Friendly	AZ (Netherlands)	1–1	(Belgium) Gent	Alkmaar, Netherlands
16:30 CEST (UTC+2)	Sugawara 76'	Report	Ngadeu-Ngadjui 51'	Stadium: AFAS Stadion; Attendance: 0 Referee: Thomas Hardeman

16 April 2021 Friendly	AZ (Netherlands)	1–0	(Netherlands) FC Utrecht	Wijdewormer, Netherlands
16:30 CEST (UTC+2)	Wijndal (yellow card) 76'; Boadu 89'	Report		Stadium: AFAS Trainingscomplex; Attendance: 0

== Competitions ==
=== Overview ===
Competition	First match	Last match	Starting round	Final position	Record							
Competition	First match	Last match	Starting round	Final position	Pld	W	D	L	GF	GA	GD	Win %
Eredivisie	19 September 2020	16 May 2021	Matchday 1	3rd	34	21	8	5	75	41	+34	61.76
KNVB Cup	20 January 2021		Round of 16	Round of 16	1	0	0	1	0	1	−1	0.00
Champions League	26 August 2020	15 September 2020	Second qualifying round	Third qualifying round	2	1	0	1	3	3	+0	50.00
Europa League	22 October 2020	10 December 2020	Group stage	Group stage	6	2	2	2	7	5	+2	33.33
Total					43	24	10	9	85	50	+35	55.81

Source: Soccerway

=== Eredivisie ===
==== League table ====
Pos	Team	Pld	W	D	L	GF	GA	GD	Pts	Qualification or relegation
1	Ajax (C)	34	28	4	2	102	23	+79	88	Qualification for the Champions League group stage
2	PSV Eindhoven	34	21	9	4	74	35	+39	72	Qualification for the Champions League second qualifying round
3	AZ	34	21	8	5	75	41	+34	71	Qualification for the Europa League play-off round
4	Vitesse	34	18	7	9	52	38	+14	61	Qualification for the Europa Conference League third qualifying round
5	Feyenoord (O)	34	16	11	7	64	36	+28	59	Qualification for the European competition play-offs (Note: Winner of play-off will qualify to Europa Conference League second qualifying round.)

Source: Eredivisie, Soccerway
Rules for classification: Season in progress: 1) Most points won; 2) Less points lost; 3) Goal difference; 4) Goals scored; 5) Alphabetical order; End of season: 1) Points; 2) Goal difference; 3) Goals scored; 4) Head-to-head points; 5) Head-to-head goal difference; 6) Head-to-head away goals scored; 7) Play-off if relevant for deciding champion, relegation or participating in a European league, otherwise by draw. 8) Penalty shoot-out (only after a play-off)
(C) Champions; (O) Play-off winners

==== Results summary ====
Overall								Home						Away					
Pld	W	D	L	GF	GA	GD	Pts	W	D	L	GF	GA	GD	W	D	L	GF	GA	GD
34	21	8	5	75	41	+34	71	12	2	3	39	18	+21	9	6	2	36	23	+13

Source: Eredivisie

==== Results by round ====
Round	1	2	3	4	5	6	7	8	9	10	11	12	13	14	15	16	17	18	19	20	21	22	23	24	25	26	27	28	29	30	31	32	33	34
Ground	A	H	A	A	H	A	H	A	H	A	H	A	H	H	A	A	H	A	H	H	A	H	A	H	A	H	H	A	H	A	A	H	A	H
Result	D	D	D	D	D	D	W	W	W	W	L	W	W	W	D	W	W	W	L	L	W	W	W	W	L	W	W	W	W	L	W	W	D	W
Position	11	12	13	13	11	10	9	8	7	7	8	6	6	5	5	5	5	4	4	5	5	3	3	3	3	3	3	3	3	3	3	3	3	3

Source: Eredivisie
A = Away; H = Home; W = Win; D = Draw; L = Loss

==== Matches ====
The league fixtures were announced on 24 July 2020.

19 September 2020 2	AZ	1–1	PEC Zwolle	Alkmaar
16:30 CEST (UTC+2)	Stengs (red card) 17'; Boadu 68'; Guðmundsson (yellow card) 72'; Svensson (yellow card) 90+2'	Report	Van Duinen (yellow card) 9'; Leemans 38'; Huiberts (yellow card) 40'; Van Polen (yellow card) 71'; Lam (yellow card) 74', (red card) 83'; Nakayama (yellow card) 90+5'	Stadium: AFAS Stadion; Attendance: 5,000; Referee: Serdar Gözübüyük

26 September 2020 3	Fortuna Sittard	3–3	AZ	Sittard
18:45 CEST (UTC+2)	Flemming 9', 90+6'; Hansson 79'; Rota (yellow card) 87'; Smeets (yellow card) 90+5'	Report	De Wit 23'; Chatzidiakos (yellow card) 37'; Koopmeiners 52'; Boadu 69'	Stadium: Fortuna Sittard Stadion; Attendance: 3,000; Referee: Björn Kuipers

4 October 2020 4	Sparta Rotterdam	4–4	AZ	Rotterdam
14:30 CEST (UTC+2)	Harroui 57'; Abels 64'; Thy 88' (pen.); Mijnans 90', (yellow card) 90+5'	Report	Aboukhlal 9', 19', (yellow card) 67'; De Wit 14', 33'; Bizot (yellow card) 55' (yellow-red card) 85'; Boadu (yellow card) 56'	Stadium: Het Kasteel; Attendance: 0 Referee: Danny Makkelie

17 October 2020 5	AZ	2–2	VVV-Venlo	Alkmaar
21:00 CEST (UTC+2)	Karlsson 2'; Stengs 24'; Svensson (red card) 41'; De Wit (yellow card) 78'	Report	Machach (yellow card) 19'; Gelmi (yellow card) 30'; Hunte (yellow card) 46'; Linthorst 86'; Giakoumakis 88'	Stadium: AFAS Stadion; Attendance: 0 Referee: Christiaan Bax

25 October 2020 6	ADO Den Haag	2–2	AZ	The Hague
20:00 CET (UTC+1)	De Boer (yellow card) 47'; Van Ewijk 64'; Kramer 87'; Besuijen (yellow card) 90+3'	Report	Guðmundsson 33'; De Wit (yellow card) 60'; Karlsson 66'	Stadium: Cars Jeans Stadion; Referee: Allard Lindhout

1 November 2020 7	AZ	3–0	RKC Waalwijk	Alkmaar
20:00 CET (UTC+1)	Stengs 5'; Chatzidiakos (yellow card) 34'; Guðmundsson 72', 90+1'	Report	Ngonge (yellow card) 56'; Azhil (yellow card) 83'	Stadium: AFAS Stadion; Attendance: 0 Referee: Martin van den Kerkhof

8 November 2020 8	SC Heerenveen	0–3	AZ	Heerenveen
16:45 CET (UTC+1)	Van Hecke (yellow card) 28'	Report	Koopmeiners 29'; Woudenberg 41'; Karlsson 47'	Stadium: Abe Lenstra Stadion; Attendance: 0 Referee: Dennis Higler

21 November 2020 9	AZ	1–0	FC Emmen	Alkmaar
20:00 CET (UTC+1)	Martins Indi 11'; Koopmeiners (yellow card) 86'; Svensson (yellow card) 88'	Report	Bernadou (red card) 60'; Cavlan (yellow card) 62'	Stadium: AFAS Stadion; Attendance: 0 Referee: Marc Nagtegaal

29 November 2020 10	Heracles Almelo	1–2	AZ	Almelo
16:45 CET (UTC+1)	Bakış (yellow card) 69'; Schoofs 75'; Quagliata (yellow card) 86'	Report	Koopmeiners 41' (pen.); Boadu 44'; De Wit (yellow card) 66'	Stadium: Erve Asito; Attendance: 0 Referee: Pol van Boekel

6 December 2020 11	AZ	1–2	FC Groningen	Alkmaar
14:30 CET (UTC+1)	Midtsjø (yellow card) 8' (yellow-red card) 57'; Koopmeiners 21', (yellow card) 90+5'; Martins Indi (yellow card) 78' (yellow-red card) 85'; Stengs (yellow card) 90+1'; Wijndal (yellow card) 90+5'	Report	El Messaoudi 69', 74'; Joosten (yellow card) 79'; El Hankouri (red card) 90+5'	Stadium: AFAS Stadion; Attendance: 0 Referee: Serdar Gözübüyük

13 December 2020 12	FC Twente	1–3	AZ	Enschede
20:00 CET (UTC+1)	Drommel (yellow card) 33'; Danilo 73' (pen.), (yellow card) 90+2'; Oosterwolde (red card) 88'	Report	Koopmeiners 34' (pen.), 90'; Sugawara 43'	Stadium: De Grolsch Veste; Attendance: 0 Referee: Danny Makkelie

20 December 2020 13	AZ	5–3	Willem II	Alkmaar
16:45 CET (UTC+1)	Koopmeiners 38', 43'; Stengs 53'; Midtsjø 65'; Karlsson 69' (pen.)	Report	Aboukhlal 22' (o.g.); Ndayishimiye 36' (pen.); Köhn (yellow card) 68'; Nunnely 90'	Stadium: AFAS Stadion; Attendance: 0 Referee: Dennis Higler

23 December 2020 14	AZ	3–1	Vitesse	Alkmaar
16:30 CET (UTC+1)	Karlsson 5'; Boadu 40'; Druijf 75'	Report	Openda 46'	Stadium: AFAS Stadion; Attendance: 0 Referee: Bas Nijhuis

27 December 2020 1	FC Utrecht	2–2	AZ	Utrecht
14:30 CET (UTC+1)	Hoogma (yellow card) 16'; Elia 30'; Van Overeem (yellow card) 45+4'; Gustafson (yellow card) 63'; Dalmau 90+3'	Report	Koopmeiners 64' (pen.); Stengs 83'	Stadium: Stadion Galgenwaard; Attendance: 0 Referee: Pol van Boekel

9 January 2021 15	PEC Zwolle	1–1	AZ	Zwolle
20:00 CET (UTC+1)	Clement 9'; Kersten (yellow card) 80'	Report	Midtsjø 67'	Stadium: MAC³PARK Stadion; Attendance: 0 Referee: Kevin Blom

13 January 2021 16	PSV	1–3	AZ	Eindhoven
18:45 CET (UTC+1)	Rosario (yellow card) 26'; Dumfries (yellow card) 56'; Max 59'; Sangaré (yellow card) 69'	Report	Koopmeiners 31' (pen.), 39'; Chatzidiakos (yellow card) 58'; Martins Indi (yellow card) 68'; Wijndal (yellow card) 77'; Stengs 90'	Stadium: Philips Stadion; Attendance: 0 Referee: Serdar Gözübüyük

16 January 2021 17	AZ	2–1	ADO Den Haag	Alkmaar
21:00 CET (UTC+1)	Aboukhlal 72', 89'	Report	Kramer 58'	Stadium: AFAS Stadion; Attendance: 0 Referee: Björn Kuipers

24 January 2021 18	Feyenoord	2–3	AZ	Rotterdam
16:45 CET (UTC+1)	Jørgensen 32'; Diemers 58'; Sinisterra (yellow card) 90+7'	Report	Karlsson 10'; Boadu 47', 70'; Koopmeiners (penalty missed) 90+6'	Stadium: De Kuip; Attendance: 0 Referee: Allard Lindhout

27 January 2021 19	AZ	0–1	FC Utrecht	Alkmaar
18:45 CET (UTC+1)	Wijndal (yellow card) 70'	Report	Ramselaar (yellow card) 51'; Van de Streek 69'; Janssen (yellow card) 81'	Stadium: AFAS Stadion; Attendance: 0 Referee: Dennis Higler

31 January 2021 20	AZ	0–3	Ajax	Alkmaar
16:45 CET (UTC+1)		Report	Antony 14'; Klaassen 60'; Neres 90+4'	Stadium: AFAS Stadion; Attendance: 0 Referee: Bas Nijhuis

6 February 2021 21	FC Emmen	0–1	AZ	Emmen
20:00 CET (UTC+1)		Report	Chatzidiakos (yellow card) 42'; Sugawara 71'	Stadium: De Oude Meerdijk; Attendance: 0 Referee: Pol van Boekel

14 February 2021 22	AZ	3–1	SC Heerenveen	Alkmaar
12:15 CET (UTC+1)	Stengs 20'; Koopmeiners 47' (pen.); Chatzidiakos (yellow card) 60'; Guðmundsson 81'	Report	Van Hecke (yellow card) 46'; Schöne 54'; Kongolo (yellow card) 87'	Stadium: AFAS Stadion; Attendance: 0 Referee: Danny Makkelie

20 February 2021 23	VVV-Venlo	1–4	AZ	Venlo
20:00 CET (UTC+1)	Donis 24'; Kum (red card) 58'	Report	Karlsson 15'; Wijndal (yellow card) 23'; Evjen 56'; Boadu 64', 85'	Stadium: De Koel; Attendance: 0 Referee: Jochem Kamphuis

28 February 2021 24	AZ	4–2	Feyenoord	Alkmaar
16:45 CET (UTC+1)	Sugawara (yellow card) 9'; Boadu 22', 41', 64'; Koopmeiners 76' (pen.)	Report	Senesi 8'; Sinisterra 25'; Linssen (yellow card) 47'; Botteghin (yellow card) 69'; Fer (yellow card) 75'; Berghuis (yellow card) 83'	Stadium: AFAS Stadion; Attendance: 0 Referee: Björn Kuipers

7 March 2021 25	Vitesse	2–1	AZ	Arnhem
16:45 CET (UTC+1)	Bero (yellow card) 12'; Tannane (yellow card) 12'; Openda 31'; Rasmussen 72'; Cornelisse (red card) 79'; Dasa (yellow card) 90+3'	Report	De Wit (yellow card) 19'; Karlsson 81'	Stadium: GelreDome; Attendance: 0 Referee: Pol van Boekel

13 March 2021 26	AZ	4–1	FC Twente	Alkmaar
20:00 CET (UTC+1)	Boadu 4'; Đumić 22' (o.g.); Drommel 34' (o.g.); Martins Indi (yellow card) 43'; Koopmeiners 78'	Report	Đumić (yellow card) 36'; Guðmundsson 40' (o.g.); Zerrouki (yellow card) 57'	Stadium: AFAS Stadion; Attendance: 0 Referee: Kevin Blom

21 March 2021 27	AZ	2–0	PSV	Alkmaar
14:30 CET (UTC+1)	Karlsson 4'; Koopmeiners 68'	Report	Sangaré (yellow card) 73'	Stadium: AFAS Stadion; Attendance: 0 Referee: Dennis Higler

3 April 2021 28	Willem II	0–1	AZ	Tilburg
20:00 CEST (UTC+2)	Llonch (yellow card) 37'; Saddiki (yellow card) 74'	Report	Koopmeiners (red card) 5'; Guðmundsson 72'; Midtsjø (yellow card) 77'	Stadium: Koning Willem II Stadion; Attendance: 0 Referee: Kevin Blom

10 April 2021 29	AZ	2–0	Sparta Rotterdam	Alkmaar
20:00 CEST (UTC+2)	Clasie 13'; De Wit 66'	Report	Pinto (yellow card) 71'	Stadium: AFAS Stadion; Attendance: 0 Referee: Björn Kuipers

25 April 2021 30	Ajax	2–0	AZ	Amsterdam
14:30 CEST (UTC+2)	Klaassen 66', 90'	Report	Karlsson (yellow card) 42'	Stadium: Johan Cruyff Arena; Attendance: 7,500; Referee: Pol van Boekel

1 May 2021 31	RKC Waalwijk	1–3	AZ	Waalwijk
20:00 CEST (UTC+2)	Oosting 17'; Sow (red card) 69'	Report	Guðmundsson 28'; Boadu 63'; Letschert (yellow card) 69'; Stengs 82'; Sugawara (yellow card) 90+3'	Stadium: Mandemakers Stadion; Attendance: 0 Referee: Dennis Higler

8 May 2021 32	AZ	1–0	Fortuna Sittard	Alkmaar
20:00 CEST (UTC+2)	Guðmundsson 29' (pen.); Aboukhlal (yellow card) 31'; Leeuwin (red card) 49'; Bizot (yellow card) 90+3'; Midtsjø (yellow card) 90+5'	Report	Van Osch (yellow card) 27'	Stadium: AFAS Stadion; Attendance: 0 Referee: Edwin van de Graaf

13 May 2021 33	FC Groningen	0–0	AZ	Groningen
14:30 CEST (UTC+2)	Itakura (yellow card) 68'; Te Wierik (yellow card) 72'; Van Hintum (yellow card) 80'	Report	Svensson (yellow card) 70'	Stadium: Euroborg; Attendance: 0 Referee: Allard Lindhout

16 May 2021 34	AZ	5–0	Heracles Almelo	Alkmaar
14:30 CEST (UTC+2)	Boadu 41', 74'; Karlsson 50', 57'; Leeuwin (yellow card) 80'; Wijndal (penalty missed) 87', 87'; Bizot (yellow card) 90'	Report	Fadiga (yellow card) 59'; Knoester (yellow card) 76'	Stadium: AFAS Stadion; Attendance: 0 Referee: Jochem Kamphuis

=== KNVB Cup ===
20 January 2021 Round of 16	AZ	0–1	Ajax	Alkmaar
21:00 CET (UTC+1)	Guðmundsson (yellow card) 69'; Koopmeiners (yellow card) 74'	Report	Labyad 34'; Rensch (yellow card) 41'; Klaassen (yellow card) 84'; Gravenberch (yellow card) 90+3'	Stadium: AFAS Stadion; Attendance: 0 Referee: Jochem Kamphuis

=== UEFA Champions League ===
==== Qualifying rounds ====
26 August 2020 Second qualifying round	AZ (Netherlands)	3–1 (a.e.t.)	(Czech Republic) Viktoria Plzeň	Alkmaar, Netherlands
16:30 CEST (UTC+2)	Leeuwin (yellow card) 76'; Koopmeiners 90+5' (pen.); Guðmundsson 98', 118'; Druijf (yellow card) 106'; Boadu (yellow card) 110'; Wijndal (yellow card) 112'	Report	Hejda (yellow card) 52'; Limberský 78'; Hruška (yellow card) 84'	Stadium: AFAS Stadion; Attendance: 0 Referee: Luís Godinho (Portugal)

15 September 2020 Third qualifying round	Dynamo Kyiv (Ukraine)	2–0	(Netherlands) AZ	Kyiv, Ukraine
20:00 EEST (UTC+3)	Buyalskyi (yellow card) 15'; Rodrigues (yellow card) 19', (goal) 49'; Kędziora (yellow card) 85'; Shaparenko 86'	Report	Stengs (yellow card) 33'; Clasie (yellow card) 83'; Idrissi (yellow card) 85'	Stadium: Olimpiyskiy National Sports Complex; Attendance: 0 Referee: Orel Grinfeld (Israel)

=== UEFA Europa League ===
==== Group stage ====
The group stage draw was held on 2 October 2020.

Pos	Team	Pld	W	D	L	GF	GA	GD	Pts	Qualification	NAP	RSO	AZ	RJK
1	(Italy) Napoli	6	3	2	1	7	4	+3	11	Advance to knockout phase	—	1–1	0–1	2–0
2	(Spain) Real Sociedad	6	2	3	1	5	4	+1	9	Advance to knockout phase	0–1	—	1–0	2–2
3	(Netherlands) AZ	6	2	2	2	7	5	+2	8		1–1	0–0	—	4–1
4	(Croatia) Rijeka	6	1	1	4	6	12	−6	4		1–2	0–1	2–1	—

Source: UEFA
Rules for classification: Group stage tiebreakers

22 October 2020 1	Napoli (Italy)	0–1	(Netherlands) AZ	Naples, Italy
18:55 CEST (UTC+2)	Koulibaly (yellow card) 90'	Report	De Wit 57', (yellow card) 81'	Stadium: Stadio San Paolo; Attendance: 494; Referee: Daniel Stefański (Poland)

29 October 2020 2	AZ (Netherlands)	4–1	(Croatia) Rijeka	Alkmaar, Netherlands
21:00 CET (UTC+1)	Koopmeiners 6' (pen.), (yellow card) 17'; Guðmundsson 20', 60', (yellow card) 31'; Karlsson 51'	Report	Kulenović (yellow card) 13', (goal) 72'; Menalo (yellow card) 34'; Lepinjica (yellow card) 86'	Stadium: AZ Stadion; Attendance: 0 Referee: Sergey Ivanov (Russia)

5 November 2020 3	Real Sociedad (Spain)	1–0	(Netherlands) AZ	San Sebastián, Spain
18:55 CET (UTC+1)	Silva (yellow card) 45+1'; Portu 58'	Report	Guðmundsson (yellow card) 7'; Druijf (yellow card) 72'; Svensson (yellow card) 90+2'	Stadium: Reale Arena; Attendance: 0 Referee: John Beaton (Scotland)

26 November 2020 4	AZ (Netherlands)	0–0	(Spain) Real Sociedad	Alkmaar, Netherlands
21:00 CET (UTC+1)	Midtsjø (yellow card) 26'; Svensson (yellow card) 42'; Martins Indi (yellow card) 75'; Chatzidiakos (yellow card) 79'; Boadu (yellow card) 90+3'	Report	Oyarzabal (yellow card) 75'	Stadium: AZ Stadion; Attendance: 0 Referee: Aleksandar Stavrev (North Macedonia)

3 December 2020 5	AZ (Netherlands)	1–1	(Italy) Napoli	Alkmaar, Netherlands
21:00 CET (UTC+1)	Martins Indi (yellow card) 41', (goal) 54'; Wijndal (yellow card) 56'; Koopmeiners (penalty missed) 60'	Report	Mertens 6'; Demme (yellow card) 90+2'	Stadium: AZ Stadion; Referee: Ruddy Buquet (France)

10 December 2020 6	Rijeka (Croatia)	2–1	(Netherlands) AZ	Rijeka, Croatia
18:55 CET (UTC+1)	Menalo (yellow card) 28', (goal) 52'; Capan (yellow card) 38'; Lončar (yellow card) 82'; Tomečak 90+3'	Report	Wijndal (yellow card) 38', (goal) 57'; Midtsjø (yellow card) 45+1'; Karlsson (red card) 81'; Stengs (yellow card) 83'	Stadium: Stadion Rujevica; Referee: Sergei Karasev (Russia)

== Statistics ==
=== Squad statistics ===
Last updated on 27 December 2020.

No.	Pos	Nat	Player	Total		Eredivisie		KNVB Cup		UEFA Champions League		UEFA Europa League	
No.	Pos	Nat	Player	Apps	Goals	Apps	Goals	Apps	Goals	Apps	Goals	Apps	Goals
Goalkeepers
1	GK	(Netherlands) NED	Marco Bizot	21	0	13	0	0	0	2	0	6	0
16	GK	(Netherlands) NED	Hobie Verhulst	2	0	1+1	0	0	0	0	0	0	0
30	GK	(Netherlands) NED	Mees Bakker	0	0	0	0	0	0	0	0	0	0
Defenders
2	DF	(Norway) NOR	Jonas Svensson	14	0	8	0	0	0	2	0	4	0
3	DF	(Greece) GRE	Pantelis Chatzidiakos	19	0	12+1	0	0	0	0	0	6	0
4	DF	(Netherlands) NED	Ron Vlaar	0	0	0	0	0	0	0	0	0	0
5	DF	(Netherlands) NED	Owen Wijndal	20	1	14	0	0	0	0	0	6	1
15	DF	(Netherlands) NED	Bruno Martins Indi	14	2	7	1	0	0	2	0	5	1
19	DF	(Netherlands) NED	Juan Castillo	1	0	0+1	0	0	0	0	0	0	0
22	DF	(Netherlands) NED	Timo Letschert	10	0	7+1	0	0	0	0	0	0+2	0
26	DF	(Japan) JPN	Yukinari Sugawara	14	1	6+3	1	0	0	0+2	0	3	0
27	DF	(Netherlands) NED	Ramon Leeuwin	7	0	1+3	0	0	0	0+1	0	0+2	0
40	DF	(Netherlands) NED	Maxim Gullit	1	0	0	0	0	0	0	0	0+1	0
51	DF	(Netherlands) NED	Tijs Velthuis	1	0	0	0	0	0	0	0	0+1	0
Midfielders
6	MF	(Norway) NOR	Fredrik Midtsjø	21	1	13	1	0	0	2	0	6	0
8	MF	(Netherlands) NED	Teun Koopmeiners	22	11	14	9	0	0	2	1	6	1
10	MF	(Netherlands) NED	Dani de Wit	17	4	10	3	0	0	2	0	5	1
18	MF	(Norway) NOR	Håkon Evjen	7	0	1+4	0	0	0	0	0	0+2	0
20	MF	(Netherlands) NED	Jordy Clasie	2	0	0	0	0	0	2	0	0	0
21	MF	(Netherlands) NED	Kenzo Goudmijn	0	0	0	0	0	0	0	0	0	0
23	MF	(Netherlands) NED	Mohamed Taabouni	0	0	0	0	0	0	0	0	0	0
24	MF	(Netherlands) NED	Tijjani Reijnders	8	0	3+5	0	0	0	0	0	0	0
25	MF	(Netherlands) NED	Thijs Oosting	0	0	0	0	0	0	0	0	0	0
Forwards
7	FW	(Netherlands) NED	Calvin Stengs	20	4	12	4	0	0	2	0	6	0
9	FW	(Netherlands) NED	Myron Boadu	18	4	10+2	4	0	0	2	0	2+2	0
11	FW	(Sweden) SWE	Jesper Karlsson	18	6	12	5	0	0	0	0	5+1	1
14	FW	(Netherlands) NED	Ferdy Druijf	12	1	0+8	1	0	0	0+2	0	0+2	0
17	FW	(Morocco) MAR	Zakaria Aboukhlal	16	2	4+7	2	0	0	0	0	1+4	0
28	FW	(Iceland) ISL	Albert Guðmundsson	15	7	6+1	3	0	0	1+1	2	5+1	2
44	FW	(Turkey) TUR	Yusuf Barasi	1	0	0	0	0	0	0	0	0+1	0
Players who have made an appearance this season but have left the club
11	FW	(Morocco) MAR	Oussama Idrissi	2	0	0	0	0	0	1+1	0	0	0

=== Goalscorers ===
As of 26 August 2020

Rank	No.	Pos	Nat	Name	Eredivisie	KNVB Cup	Champions League	Total
1	28	FW	(Iceland)	Albert Guðmundsson	0	0	2	2
2	8	MF	(Netherlands)	Teun Koopmeiners	0	0	1	1
Totals					0	0	3	3
