= 2018–19 AZ Alkmaar season =

AZ Alkmaar
2018–19 season
- Executive director Technical director: Robert Eenhoorn; Max Huiberts
- Chairman: René Neelissen
- Manager: John van den Brom
- Stadium: AFAS Stadion
- Eredivisie: 4th
- KNVB Cup: Semi-finals
- UEFA Europa League: Second qualifying round
Home colours	Away colours	Third colours

The 2018–19 season was the 53rd season of AZ Alkmaar and the club's 21st consecutive season in the top flight of Dutch football. In addition to the domestic league, AZ Alkmaar participated in the KNVB Cup and the UEFA Europa League. The season covered the period from 1 July 2018 to 30 June 2019.

== Players ==
=== First-team squad ===
As of 1 March 2019

For recent transfers, see List of Dutch football transfers winter 2017–18

Note: Flags indicate national team as defined under FIFA eligibility rules; some limited exceptions apply. Players may hold more than one non-FIFA nationality.

No.	Pos.	Nation	Player
1	GK	NED	Marco Bizot
2	DF	NOR	Jonas Svensson
3	DF	GER	Henri Weigelt
4	DF	NED	Ron Vlaar (vice-captain)
5	DF	NED	Thomas Ouwejan
6	MF	NOR	Fredrik Midtsjø
7	FW	NED	Calvin Stengs
8	MF	NED	Teun Koopmeiners
9	FW	NOR	Bjørn Maars Johnsen
10	MF	NED	Guus Til (captain)
11	FW	MAR	Oussama Idrissi
12	DF	GRE	Pantelis Hatzidiakos
15	DF	NED	Owen Wijndal

No.	Pos.	Nation	Player
16	GK	NED	Rody de Boer
17	MF	NED	Jeremy Helmer
20	MF	NED	Mats Seuntjens
21	FW	NED	Myron Boadu
22	GK	NED	Piet Velthuizen
23	DF	NED	Léon Bergsma
24	MF	NED	Tijjani Reijnders
25	GK	NED	Jasper Schendelaar
26	MF	NED	Adam Maher
27	FW	CZE	Ondrej Mihálik
28	FW	ISL	Albert Guðmundsson
30	DF	BEL	Stijn Wuytens
34	DF	NED	Ricardo van Rhijn

=== Out on loan ===
Note: Flags indicate national team as defined under FIFA eligibility rules; some limited exceptions apply. Players may hold more than one non-FIFA nationality.

No.	Pos.	Nation	Player
—	GK	NED	Nick Olij (on loan at TOP Oss until 30 June 2019)
—	MF	MAR	Iliass Bel Hassani (on loan at FC Groningen until 30 June 2019)
—	FW	NGR	Fred Friday (on loan at FC Twente until 30 June 2019)
—	FW	NED	Ferdy Druijf (on loan at NEC until 30 June 2019)
—	MF	NED	Marko Vejinović (on loan at Arka Gdynia until 30 June 2019)

== Competitions ==
=== Overview ===
Competition	First match	Last match	Starting round	Final position	Record							
Competition	First match	Last match	Starting round	Final position	Pld	W	D	L	GF	GA	GD	Win %
Eredivisie	10 August 2018	15 May 2019	Matchday 1	4th	34	17	7	10	64	43	+21	50.00
KNVB Cup	27 September 2018	28 February 2019	First round	Semi-finals	5	4	1	0	16	1	+15	80.00
Europa League	26 July 2018	2 August 2018	Second qualifying round	Second qualifying round	2	1	0	1	2	3	−1	50.00
Total					41	22	8	11	82	47	+35	53.66

Last updated: 15 May 2019
Source: Soccerway

=== Eredivisie ===
==== League table ====
Pos	Team	Pld	W	D	L	GF	GA	GD	Pts	Qualification or relegation
2	PSV Eindhoven	34	26	5	3	98	26	+72	83	Qualification for the Champions League second qualifying round
3	Feyenoord	34	20	5	9	75	41	+34	65	Qualification for the Europa League third qualifying round (Note: Since the winners of the 2018–19 KNVB Cup, Ajax, qualified for European competition based on league position, the spot awarded to the KNVB Cup winners (Europa League third qualifying round) was passed to the third-placed team and the spot awarded to the third-placed team (Europa League second qualifying round) was passed to the fourth-placed team.)
4	AZ	34	17	7	10	64	43	+21	58	Qualification for the Europa League second qualifying round
5	Vitesse	34	14	11	9	70	51	+19	53	Qualification for the European competition play-offs (Note: Four teams play for a spot in the 2019–20 UEFA Europa League second qualifying round.)
6	Utrecht (O)	34	15	8	11	60	51	+9	53	Qualification for the European competition play-offs

Source: eredivisie.nl
Rules for classification: Season in progress: 1) Most points won; 2) Less points lost; 3) Goal difference; 4) Goals scored; 5) Alphabetical order; End of season: 1) Points; 2) Goal difference; 3) Goals scored; 4) Head-to-head points; 5) Head-to-head goal difference; 6) Head-to-head away goals scored; 7) Play-off if relevant for deciding champion, relegation or participating in a European league, otherwise by draw. 8) Penalty shoot-out (only after a play-off)
(O) Play-off winners
Notes:

Ten teams, two from the Eredivisie and eight from the Eerste Divisie, played for two spots in the 2019–20 Eredivisie, the remaining eight teams playing in the 2019–20 Eerste Divisie.

First round
NEC	2	0	2
RKC Waalwijk	0	3	3
SC Cambuur	2	2	4
Almere City	2	1	3

Second round
RKC Waalwijk	2	1	3
Excelsior	1	1	2
Go Ahead Eagles	2	1	3
FC Den Bosch	2	0	2
TOP Oss	0	0	0
Sparta Rotterdam	2	3	5
SC Cambuur	1	0	1
De Graafschap	1	2	3

Third round
RKC Waalwijk*	0	5	5
Go Ahead Eagles	0	4	4
Sparta Rotterdam*	1	2	3
De Graafschap	2	0	2

Key: * = Play-off winners, (a) = Wins because of away goals rule, (e) = Wins after extra time in second leg, (p) = Wins after penalty shoot-out.

==== Results summary ====
Overall								Home						Away					
Pld	W	D	L	GF	GA	GD	Pts	W	D	L	GF	GA	GD	W	D	L	GF	GA	GD
34	17	7	10	64	43	+21	58	11	3	3	35	15	+20	6	4	7	29	28	+1

Last updated: 15 May 2019.
Source: Eredivisie

==== Results by round ====
Round	1	2	3	4	5	6	7	8	9	10	11	12	13	14	15	16	17	18	19	20	21	22	23	24	25	26	27	28	29	30	31	32	33	34
Ground																																		
Result																																		
Position	1	1	2	4	5	5	5	6	6	9	6	5	7	7	6	5	7	5	4	4	4	4	4	4	4	4	3	3	4	4	4	4	4	4

Updated to match(es) played on 15 May 2019. Source: Eredivisie
A = Away; H = Home; W = Win; D = Draw; L = Loss

==== Matches ====
11 November 2018 12	ADO Den Haag	0–1	AZ	The Hague
14:30 CET (UTC+1)				Stadium: Cars Jeans Stadion; Referee: Dennis Higler

25 November 2018 13	VVV-Venlo	2–2	AZ	Venlo
16:45 CET (UTC+1)				Stadium: De Koel; Referee: Jeroen Manschot

1 December 2018 14	AZ	0–2	Willem II	Alkmaar
19:45 CET (UTC+1)				Stadium: AFAS Stadion; Referee: Allard Lindhout

7 December 2018 15	Fortuna Sittard	0–3	AZ	Sittard
18:30 CET (UTC+1)				Stadium: Fortuna Sittard Stadion

15 December 2018 16	AZ	2–1	Excelsior	Alkmaar
19:45 CET (UTC+1)				Stadium: AFAS Stadion

22 December 2018 17	PSV	3–1	AZ	Eindhoven
19:45 CET (UTC+1)				Stadium: Philips Stadion

19 January 2019 18	AZ	3–0	FC Utrecht	Alkmaar
18:30 CET (UTC+1)				Stadium: AFAS Stadion

27 January 2019 19	SC Heerenveen	0–2	AZ	Heerenveen
16:45 CET (UTC+1)				Stadium: Abe Lenstra Stadion

2 February 2019 20	AZ	5–0	FC Emmen	Alkmaar
20:45 CET (UTC+1)				Stadium: AFAS Stadion

8 February 2019 21	NAC Breda	0–3	AZ	Breda
20:00 CET (UTC+1)				Stadium: Rat Verlegh Stadion

16 February 2019 22	AZ	3–0	VVV-Venlo	Alkmaar
18:30 CET (UTC+1)				Stadium: AFAS Stadion

24 February 2019 23	Willem II	2–1	AZ	Tilburg
16:45 CET (UTC+1)				Stadium: Koning Willem II Stadion

3 March 2019 24	AZ	4–2	Fortuna Sittard	Alkmaar
16:45 CET (UTC+1)				Stadium: AFAS Stadion

10 March 2019 25	PEC Zwolle	0–0	AZ	Zwolle
12:15 CET (UTC+1)				Stadium: MAC³PARK Stadion

17 March 2019 26	AZ	1–0	Ajax	Alkmaar
14:30 CET (UTC+1)	Til 56'			Stadium: AFAS Stadion

30 March 2019 27	AZ	1–0	FC Groningen	Alkmaar
20:45 CEST (UTC+2)	Vlaar 70'			Stadium: AFAS Stadion

2 April 2019 28	Vitesse	2–2	AZ	Arnhem
18:30 CEST (UTC+2)				Stadium: GelreDome

6 April 2019 29	De Graafschap	1–1	AZ	Doetinchem
20:45 CEST (UTC+2)				Stadium: De Vijverberg

13 April 2019 30	AZ	2–3	ADO Den Haag	Alkmaar
18:30 CEST (UTC+2)				Stadium: AFAS Stadion

20 April 2019 31	Feyenoord	2–1	AZ	Rotterdam
20:45 CEST (UTC+2)				Stadium: De Kuip

23 April 2019 32	AZ	2–1	Heracles Almelo	Alkmaar
19:45 CEST (UTC+2)				Stadium: AFAS Stadion

12 May 2019 34	AZ	1–0	PSV	Alkmaar
14:30 CEST (UTC+2)				Stadium: AFAS Stadion

15 May 2019 33	Excelsior	4–2	AZ	Rotterdam
19:30 CEST (UTC+2)				Stadium: Stadion Woudestein
