= Teun Koopmeiners =

Dutch footballer (born 1998)

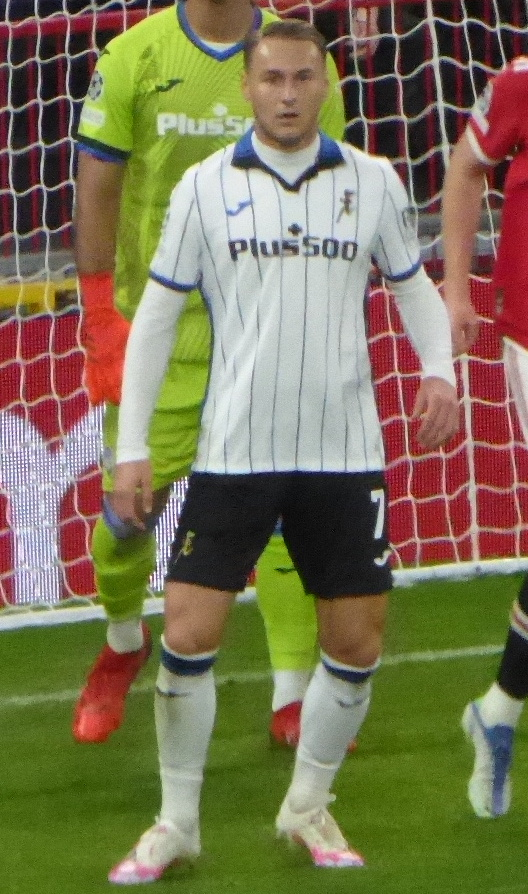
- Koopmeiners playing for Atalanta in 2021

Personal information
- Full name: Teun Koopmeiners
- Date of birth: 28 February 1998 (age 28)
- Place of birth: Castricum, Netherlands
- Height: 1.84 m (6 ft 0 in)
- Position: Midfielder

Team information
- Current team: Juventus
- Number: 8

Youth career
- Vitesse '22
- 2009–2016: AZ

Senior career*
Years	Team	Apps	(Gls)
2016–2018	Jong AZ	25	(3)
2017–2021	AZ	116	(35)
2021–2024	Atalanta	97	(26)
2024–	Juventus	70	(4)

International career^{‡}
2015	Netherlands U17	4	(0)
2015–2016	Netherlands U18	3	(0)
2016–2017	Netherlands U19	13	(0)
2017–2018	Netherlands U20	5	(0)
2018–2021	Netherlands U21	17	(4)
2020–	Netherlands	35	(4)
- * Club domestic league appearances and goals as of 09:17, 6 November 2026 (UTC) ‡ National team caps and goals as of 16 November 2026

Teun Koopmeiners (Dutch pronunciation: [tøːŋ ˈkoːpmɛinərs]; born 28 February 1998) is a Dutch professional footballer who plays as a midfielder for Serie A club Juventus and the Netherlands national team.

Having represented the Netherlands at various youth levels, Koopmeiners was called up to the senior team's preliminary UEFA Nations League squad in August 2020. He was later part of their squad for UEFA Euro 2020 and the FIFA World Cup in 2022 and 2026.

== Club career ==
=== AZ ===
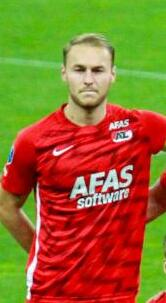
Koopmeiners lining up for AZ in 2020

Koopmeiners grew up in Castricum, North Holland, and took his first steps in football as a youth player for the local club, Vitesse '22. In 2009, he joined the AZ youth academy at under-12 level. He eventually progressed through the ranks, and as part of the club's reserve team, Jong AZ, he became champion of the Dutch third division in the 2016–17 season, reaching promotion to the Eerste Divisie.

On 18 August 2017, Koopmeiners made his professional debut for Jong AZ in a 3–1 away win over FC Den Bosch. He made his first team-debut on 1 October, coming on as a substitute for Alireza Jahanbakhsh for the final 30 minutes of a 4–0 home loss to Feyenoord. At the end of the 2017–18 season, AZ ended in third place, and thereby qualified for Europa League. In his first professional season, he made 26 league appearances in which he scored one goal.

On 1 March 2020, Koopmeiners played a 70-metre pass to set up Oussama Idrissi for AZ's second goal in a 2–0 win against Ajax which put his side level on points with Ajax. During the 2019–20 AZ Alkmaar season Koopmeiners scored 16 goals in all competitions in 42 appearances, helping his side finish second in the Eredivisie on goal difference behind the Champions AFC Ajax.

He scored his first goal of the 2020–21 season against Viktoria Plzen on 26 August 2020 in the UEFA Champions League qualifier 3–1 victory. On 14 January 2021, Koopmeiners scored two goals, including an audacious backheel flick, to help his side clinch an 3–1 away victory against PSV Eindhoven.

=== Atalanta ===
On 30 August 2021, Koopmeiners signed for Italian Serie A club Atalanta for a reported fee of €12 million. He made his debut on 11 September in the home match against Fiorentina, as a late substitute for Matteo Pessina.

On 1 September 2022, Koopmeiners scored a hat-trick in a 3–1 Serie A victory over Torino.

On 22 May 2024, he started in Atalanta's 3–0 victory over Bundesliga invincibles Bayer Leverkusen in the 2024 UEFA Europa League final.

=== Juventus ===
On 28 August 2024, Koopmeiners moved to fellow Serie A club Juventus, signing a five-year deal. The transfer fee paid to Atalanta was €51.3 million plus €3.4 million in "ancillary costs" as well as a further €6 million "upon the achievement of further performance objectives". On 1 September, Koopmeiners made his first Juventus appearance in a 0–0 draw with Roma, replacing Juan Cabal at half-time.

== International career ==
Koopmeiners made four appearances for the Netherlands national under-17 team, as well as two appearances for the national under-18 team. As part of the under-19s, he played at the 2017 UEFA European Under-19 Championship, reaching the semi-finals and only losing to Portugal. At under-19 level, Koopmeiners made 13 appearances. After five appearances for the Netherlands Under-20 team, he made his debut for the national under-21 team on 22 March 2018 in a 4–1 loss in Doetinchem to the Belgium U21.

On 19 August 2020, Koopmeiners was called up to the senior Netherlands national team by caretaker manager Dwight Lodeweges in the preliminary squad for the UEFA Nations League fixtures against Poland and Italy. The same year in October, he debuted in a friendly match against Mexico. He made his competitive debut in a 2022 FIFA World Cup qualification against Turkey on 7 September 2021, contributing with an assist in a 6–1 victory. Koopmeiners scored his first senior national team goal in a UEFA Nations League match against Wales on 8 June 2022. In the 2022 FIFA World Cup quarter-final against Argentina, also known as the Battle of Lusail, Koopmeiners assisted former AZ teammate Wout Weghorst with a clever free-kick routine in the 11th minute of stoppage time to send the fixture to extra time. He then scored his penalty in the subsequent shoot-out, but the Netherlands were eventually eliminated from the tournament, losing 4–3 on penalties.

On 29 May 2024, Koopmeiners was named in the Netherlands' squad for UEFA Euro 2024. However, he was forced to withdraw from the tournament squad after sustaining an injury during the warm-up for a friendly match against Iceland on 10 June 2024.

On 27 May 2026, Koopmeiners was named in the Netherlands' squad for the 2026 FIFA World Cup.

== Style of play ==
Koopmeiners can play as a defensive midfielder or central midfielder. He can also play as a centre-back. He is known for his leadership qualities, and captained AZ Alkmaar despite his young age.

== Personal life ==
His younger brother Peer is also a professional footballer; Peer still plays for AZ.

== Career statistics ==
=== Club ===
As of match played 5 November 2026

Appearances and goals by club, season and competition
Club	Season	League			National cup (Note: Includes KNVB Cup, Coppa Italia)		Europe		Other		Total	
Club	Season	Division	Apps	Goals	Apps	Goals	Apps	Goals	Apps	Goals	Apps	Goals
Jong AZ	2016–17	Tweede Divisie	19	2	—		—		—		19	2
Jong AZ	2017–18	Eerste Divisie	6	1	—		—		—		6	1
Jong AZ	Total		25	3	—		—		—		25	3
AZ	2017–18	Eredivisie	26	1	5	0	—		—		31	1
AZ	2018–19	Eredivisie	32	8	4	0	1 (Note: Appearance(s) in UEFA Europa League)	1	—		37	9
AZ	2019–20	Eredivisie	25	11	3	1	14	4	—		42	16
AZ	2020–21	Eredivisie	31	15	1	0	8 (Note: Appearances in UEFA Champions League)	2	—		40	17
AZ	2021–22	Eredivisie	2	0	—		2	0	—		4	0
AZ	Total		116	35	13	1	25	7	—		154	43
Atalanta	2021–22	Serie A	30	4	2	0	11 (Note: Five appearances in UEFA Champions League, six appearances in UEFA Europa League)	0	—		43	4
Atalanta	2022–23	Serie A	33	10	2	0	—		—		35	10
Atalanta	2023–24	Serie A	34	12	5	3	12	0	—		51	15
Atalanta	Total		97	26	9	3	23	0	—		129	29
Juventus	2024–25	Serie A	28	3	2	1	9	0	5 (Note: One appearance in Supercoppa Italiana, four appearances and one goal in FIFA Club World Cup)	1	44	5
Juventus	2025–26	Serie A	33	0	2	0	10	2	—		45	2
Juventus	2026–27	Serie A	9	1	0	0	4	1	—		13	2
Juventus	Total		70	4	4	1	23	3	5	1	102	9
Career total			308	68	26	5	71	10	5	1	410	84

=== International ===
As of match played 16 November 2026

Appearances and goals by national team and year
National team	Year	Apps	Goals
Netherlands	2020	1	0
Netherlands	2021	2	0
Netherlands	2022	12	1
Netherlands	2023	5	1
Netherlands	2024	3	1
Netherlands	2025	2	0
Netherlands	2026	10	1
Total		35	4

Netherlands score listed first, score column indicates score after each Koopmeiners goal.

List of international goals scored by Teun Koopmeiners
No.	Date	Venue	Cap	Opponent	Score	Result	Competition
1	8 June 2022	Cardiff City Stadium, Cardiff, Wales	7	Wales	1–0	2–1	2022–23 UEFA Nations League A
2	21 November 2023	Algarve Stadium, Algarve, Portugal	18	Gibraltar	3–0	6–0	UEFA Euro 2024 qualifying
3	16 November 2024	Johan Cruyff Arena, Amsterdam, Netherlands	22	Hungary	4–0	4–0	2024–25 UEFA Nations League A
4	4 October 2026	Philips Stadion, Eindhoven, Netherlands	33	Serbia	1–0	2–1	2026–27 UEFA Nations League A

== Honours ==
AZ

- KNVB Cup runner-up: 2017–18

Atalanta

- UEFA Europa League: 2023–24
- Coppa Italia runner-up: 2023–24

Individual

- Atalanta Goal of the season: 2022–23
- UEFA Europa League Team of the Season: 2023–24
- Serie A Team of the Year: 2023–24
