= Hobie Verhulst =

Dutch footballer (born 1993)

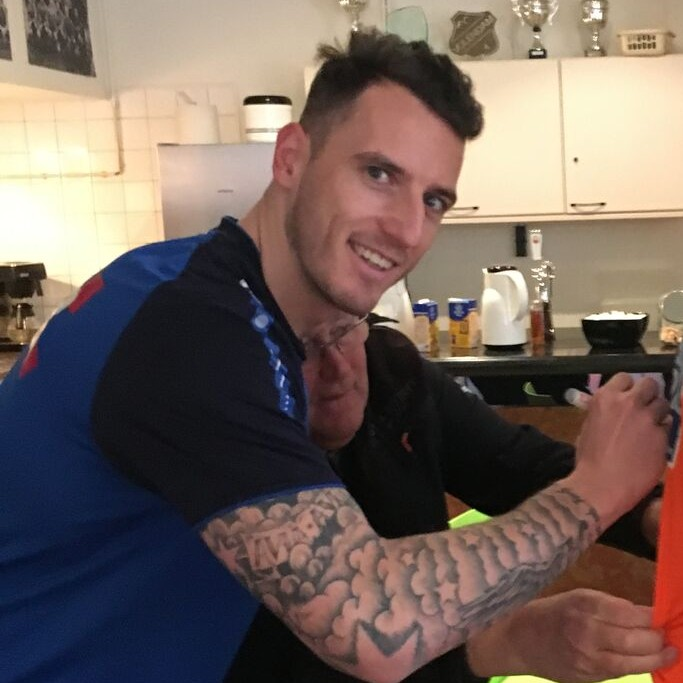
- Verhulst in 2018

Personal information
- Date of birth: 2 April 1993 (age 33)
- Place of birth: Amsterdam, Netherlands
- Height: 1.92 m (6 ft 4 in)
- Position: Goalkeeper

Team information
- Current team: AZ Alkmaar
- Number: 12

Youth career
- –2004: KFC
- 2004–2010: AZ

Senior career*
Years	Team	Apps	(Gls)
2010–2014	AZ	0	(0)
2014–2015	MVV	3	(0)
2015–2018	Volendam	107	(0)
2018–2020	Go Ahead Eagles	67	(0)
2020–	Jong AZ	25	(0)
2020–	AZ	22	(0)

International career
2007–2010	Netherlands U17	9	(0)
2010–2012	Netherlands U19	14	(0)
2012–2013	Netherlands U20	4	(0)
- * Club domestic league appearances and goals as of 15 March 2026

Hobie Verhulst (born 2 April 1993) is a Dutch professional footballer who plays as a goalkeeper for Eredivisie club AZ. He formerly played for MVV, Volendam, and Go Ahead Eagles.

== Club career ==
=== AZ ===
Verhulst joined the AZ youth academy from Kooger Football Club (KFC) in 2004. By 2010, he was part of the senior squad as a backup goalkeeper, sitting on the bench for UEFA Europa League matches against Sheriff Tiraspol and BATE Borisov and several Eredivisie games during the 2010–11 season. In 2013, he won the Beloften Eerste Divisie with Jong AZ.

=== MVV ===
Failing to make a first-team appearance for AZ, Verhulst left on a free transfer to Eerste Divisie club MVV in July 2014. At MVV, Verhulst served as the backup to Jo Coppens. He made his professional debut on 6 February 2015, replacing the injured Coppens during a match against Sparta Rotterdam. Three days later, he played a full match against Jong Twente. Verhulst made three appearances for MVV, conceding six goals.

=== Volendam ===
After one season, Verhulst moved to Volendam, where he became the first-choice goalkeeper. Over three seasons, he played more than 100 matches and was named Player of the Season for 2016–17 by the club's supporters.

=== Go Ahead Eagles ===
In the summer of 2018, Verhulst joined Go Ahead Eagles. During the 2018–19 season, Verhulst won the Bronze Shield as the best goalkeeper of the first period in the Eerste Divisie.

=== Return to AZ ===
In 2020, Verhulst rejoined AZ, initially as a backup to Marco Bizot. He made two first-team appearances during Bizot's suspension and played four matches for Jong AZ in the Eerste Divisie.

In the first half of the 2022–23 season, Verhulst became AZ's first-choice goalkeeper after spending the previous season behind Peter Vindahl. However, following the winter arrival of Matthew Ryan, Verhulst lost his starting spot. After Ryan became eligible to play on 20 January 2023, Verhulst did not make another appearance that season.

== Career statistics ==
As of match played 15 March 2026

Appearances and goals by club, season and competition
Club	Season	League			Cup		Europe		Other		Total	
Club	Season	Division	Apps	Goals	Apps	Goals	Apps	Goals	Apps	Goals	Apps	Goals
AZ	2010–11	Eredivisie	0	0	0	0	0	0	—		0	0
AZ	2011–12	Eredivisie	0	0	0	0	0	0	—		0	0
AZ	2012–13	Eredivisie	0	0	—		—		—		0	0
AZ	2013–14	Eredivisie	0	0	0	0	0	0	0	0	0	0
AZ	Total		0	0	0	0	0	0	0	0	0	0
MVV	2014–15	Eerste Divisie	3	0	0	0	—		—		3	0
Volendam	2015–16	Eerste Divisie	32	0	1	0	—		2	0	35	0
Volendam	2016–17	Eerste Divisie	37	0	4	0	—		2	0	43	0
Volendam	2017–18	Eerste Divisie	38	0	2	0	—		—		40	0
Volendam	Total		107	0	7	0	—		4	0	118	0
Go Ahead Eagles	2018–19	Eerste Divisie	38	0	2	0	—		4	0	44	0
Go Ahead Eagles	2019–20	Eerste Divisie	29	0	2	0	—		–		31	0
Go Ahead Eagles	Total		67	0	4	0	—		4	0	75	0
Jong AZ	2020–21	Eerste Divisie	4	0	—		—		—		4	0
Jong AZ	2021–22	Eerste Divisie	5	0	—		—		—		5	0
Jong AZ	2022–23	Eerste Divisie	3	0	—		—		—		3	0
Jong AZ	2023–24	Eerste Divisie	5	0	—		—		—		5	0
Jong AZ	2024–25	Eerste Divisie	6	0	—		—		—		6	0
Jong AZ	2025–26	Eerste Divisie	2	0	—		—		—		2	0
Jong AZ	Total		25	0	—		—		—		25	0
AZ	2020–21	Eredivisie	2	0	0	0	0	0	—		2	0
AZ	2021–22	Eredivisie	2	0	0	0	2	0	0	0	4	0
AZ	2022–23	Eredivisie	16	0	1	0	12	0	—		29	0
AZ	2023–24	Eredivisie	1	0	0	0	0	0	—		1	0
AZ	2025–26	Eredivisie	1	0	0	0	0	0	—		1	0
AZ	Total		22	0	1	0	14	0	0	0	37	0
Career total			225	0	12	0	14	0	8	0	259	0

== Honours ==
AZ

- KNVB Cup: 2025–26
- Johan Cruyff Shield: 2026
