= Ferdy Druijf =

Dutch footballer (born 1998)

Personal information
- Date of birth: 12 February 1998 (age 28)
- Place of birth: Uitgeest, Netherlands
- Height: 1.90 m (6 ft 3 in)
- Position: Forward

Team information
- Current team: Almere City
- Number: 9

Youth career
- FC Uitgeest
- 2012–2016: AZ

Senior career*
Years	Team	Apps	(Gls)
2016–2020	Jong AZ	68	(30)
2018–2022	AZ	26	(2)
2019	→ NEC (loan)	20	(15)
2021–2022	→ Mechelen (loan)	34	(9)
2022	→ Rapid Wien (loan)	10	(5)
2022–2025	Rapid Wien	23	(3)
2023–2024	→ PEC Zwolle (loan)	15	(5)
2025–	Almere City	30	(12)

International career^{‡}
2015	Netherlands U17	2	(0)
2015–2016	Netherlands U18	3	(0)
2017–2019	Netherlands U20	4	(0)
- * Club domestic league appearances and goals as of 25 April 2026 ‡ National team caps and goals as of 22 March 2019

Ferdy Druijf (born 12 February 1998) is a Dutch professional footballer who plays as a forward for Eerste Divisie club Almere City. He has previously represented the Netherlands at youth level and has played professionally in the Netherlands, Belgium, and Austria.

== Club career ==
Druijf began his professional career with AZ, making his Eerste Divisie debut for Jong AZ on 18 August 2017 against FC Den Bosch.

On 4 January 2019, he joined NEC on loan for the remainder of the season.

On 13 January 2021, Druijf was loaned to KV Mechelen in the Belgian Pro League until the end of the season. He made his debut three days later in a 1–0 away win over Charleroi.

On 3 February 2022, Druijf joined Austrian club Rapid Wien on loan from AZ. The move was made permanent on 1 July 2022, when he signed a three-year deal with the club.

On 14 July 2023, Druijf returned to the Netherlands, joining PEC Zwolle on a season-long loan.

On 5 February 2025, Rapid Wien announced the mutual termination of Druijf's contract. After four months as a free agent, he signed a one-year deal with recently relegated Almere City on 5 June 2025, with an option for an additional season.

== International career ==
He represented the Netherlands national under-20 football team.

== Career statistics ==
As of 13 January 2024

Club	Season	League			Cup		Continental		Other		Total	
Club	Season	Division	Apps	Goals	Apps	Goals	Apps	Goals	Apps	Goals	Apps	Goals
AZ	2017–18	Eredivisie	15	5	—		—		—		15	5
AZ	2018–19	Eredivisie	2	0	1	0	0	0	—		3	0
AZ	2019–20	Eredivisie	12	1	2	1	7 (Note: Appearances in UEFA Europa League)	3	—		21	5
AZ	2020–21	Eredivisie	9	1	0	0	4 (Note: Two appearances in UEFA Champions League, two appearances in UEFA Europa League)	0	—		13	1
AZ	Total		26	2	3	1	11	3	—		40	6
NEC (loan)	2018–19	Eerste Divisie	20	15	—		—		—		20	15
Mechelen (loan)	2020–21	Belgian First Division A	20	6	3	1	—		—		23	7
Mechelen (loan)	2021–22	Belgian First Division A	14	3	2	0	—		—		16	3
Mechelen (loan)	Total		34	9	5	1	—		—		39	10
Rapid Wien (loan)	2021–22	Austrian Bundesliga	10	5	1	0	2 (Note: Appearances in UEFA Europa Conference League)	1	—		13	6
Rapid Wien	2022–23	Austrian Bundesliga	23	3	4	2	3	2	—		30	7
PEC Zwolle (loan)	2023–24	Eredivisie	15	5	—		—		—		15	5
Career total			128	46	13	4	16	5	0	0	157	49
