= Albert Guðmundsson (footballer, born 1997) =

Icelandic footballer (born 1997)

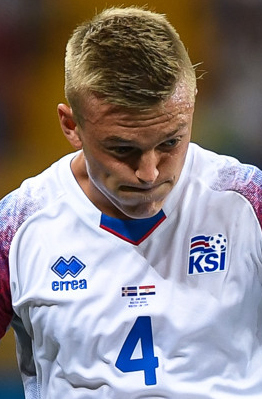
- Albert with Iceland at the 2018 FIFA World Cup

Personal information
- Full name: Albert Guðmundsson
- Date of birth: 15 June 1997 (age 29)
- Place of birth: Reykjavík, Iceland
- Height: 1.77 m (5 ft 10 in)
- Positions: Attacking midfielder; forward

Team information
- Current team: Lazio (on loan from Fiorentina)
- Number: 80

Youth career
- 2006–2013: KR
- 2013–2015: Heerenveen
- 2015–2017: PSV

Senior career*
Years	Team	Apps	(Gls)
2015–2018	Jong PSV	63	(28)
2017–2018	PSV	9	(0)
2018–2022	AZ	74	(17)
2019–2020	Jong AZ	4	(1)
2022–2025	Genoa	83	(26)
2024–2025	→ Fiorentina (loan)	24	(6)
2025–	Fiorentina	34	(5)
2026–	→ Lazio (loan)	4	(1)

International career^{‡}
2013	Iceland U16	3	(0)
2012–2013	Iceland U17	9	(4)
2014–2015	Iceland U19	11	(4)
2015–2018	Iceland U21	15	(6)
2017–	Iceland	49	(14)
- * Club domestic league appearances and goals as of 23:39, 21 November 2026 (UTC) ‡ National team caps and goals as of 3 October 2026

Albert Guðmundsson (Icelandic pronunciation: [ˈalpɛr̥t ˈkvʏðmʏntsɔn]; born 15 June 1997) is an Icelandic professional footballer who plays as an attacking midfielder or forward for Serie A club Lazio, on loan from Fiorentina, and the Iceland national team.

== Club career ==
Albert initially moved to the Netherlands joining Heerenveen in 2013. For the 2015–16 season, he signed for PSV, and made his debut for Jong PSV in 2015. In August 2018, he signed with AZ until 2022.

On 31 January 2022, he joined Genoa in Italy. On 17 November 2023, Albert extended his contract with Genoa until 2027. In the 2023–24 season, he set a new personal best in Serie A by scoring 14 goals in 35 matches.

On 16 August 2024, he joined Fiorentina on loan from Genoa. On 24 June 2025, Fiorentina made the move permanent.

On 1 September 2026, Guðmundsson joined Lazio on loan from Fiorentina.

== International career ==
Albert played at the 2017 China Cup, where Iceland finished as runners-up.

In May 2018, he was named in the national team's 23-man squad for the 2018 FIFA World Cup in Russia.

== Personal life ==
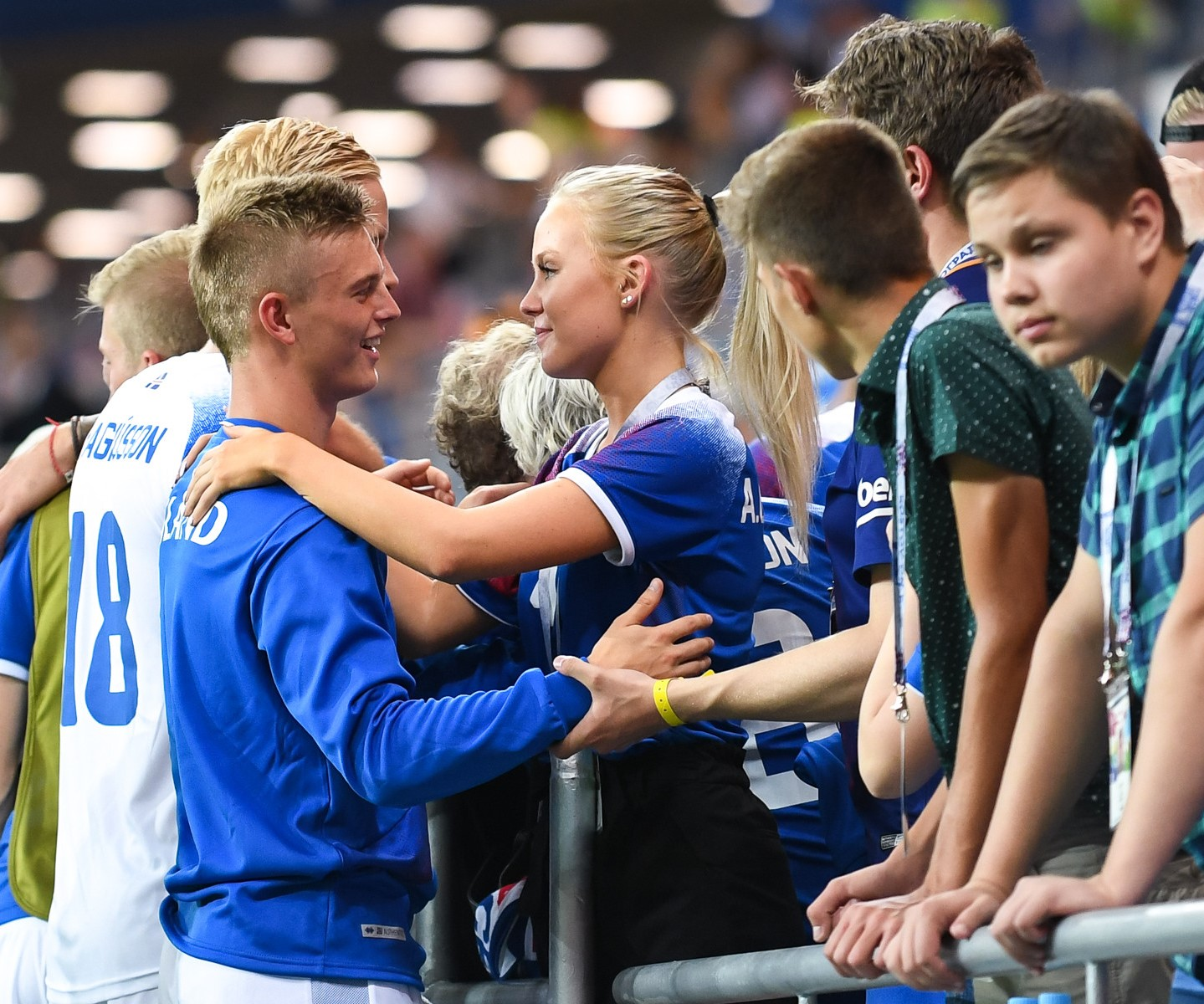
Albert speaking to his partner, following Iceland's exit from the 2018 FIFA World Cup

Albert is from a family of footballers. His father is former international striker and TV commentator Guðmundur Benediktsson. Albert's mother is former international footballer Kristbjörg Helga Ingadóttir, daughter of former international striker Ingi Björn Albertsson, who held the record for most goals in the Icelandic top division from 1987 until 2012.

The father of Ingi, and thus Albert's great-grandfather, was former AC Milan and Arsenal striker and later Minister of Finance Albert Guðmundsson, Iceland's first professional footballer. All four generations have scored for the Icelandic national team.

Albert has two children with his partner, model Guðlaug Elísa Jóhannsdóttir.

On 3 July 2024, Albert was charged with sexual assault by the district prosecutor in Iceland. He was later acquitted on 10 October.

== Career statistics ==
=== Club ===
As of match played 21 November 2026

Appearances and goals by club, season and competition
Club	Season	League			National cup (Note: Includes KNVB Cup, Coppa Italia)		Europe		Total	
Club	Season	Division	Apps	Goals	Apps	Goals	Apps	Goals	Apps	Goals
Jong PSV	2015–16	Eerste Divisie	14	1	—		—		14	1
Jong PSV	2016–17	Eerste Divisie	34	18	—		—		34	18
Jong PSV	2017–18	Eerste Divisie	15	9	—		—		15	9
Jong PSV	Total		63	28	—		—		63	28
PSV Eindhoven	2017–18	Eredivisie	9	0	3	0	0	0	12	0
AZ	2018–19	Eredivisie	25	6	2	0	—		27	6
AZ	2019–20	Eredivisie	4	0	0	0	4 (Note: Appearances in UEFA Europa League)	1	8	1
AZ	2020–21	Eredivisie	26	7	1	0	8 (Note: Two appearances and two goals in UEFA Champions League, six appearances and two goals in UEFA Europa League)	4	35	11
AZ	2021–22	Eredivisie	19	4	1	0	8 (Note: Two appearances in UEFA Europa League, six appearances and two goals in UEFA Europa Conference League)	2	28	6
AZ	Total		74	17	4	0	20	7	98	24
Jong AZ	2019–20	Eerste Divisie	4	1	—		—		4	1
Genoa	2021–22	Serie A	12	1	—		—		12	1
Genoa	2022–23	Serie B	36	11	2	3	—		38	14
Genoa	2023–24	Serie A	35	14	2	2	—		37	16
Genoa	Total		83	26	4	5	—		87	31
Fiorentina (loan)	2024–25	Serie A	24	6	1	0	8 (Note: Appearances in UEFA Conference League)	2	33	8
Fiorentina	2025–26	Serie A	33	5	1	0	12	5	46	10
Fiorentina	2026–27	Serie A	1	0	1	1	—		2	1
Fiorentina	Fiorentina total		58	11	3	1	20	7	81	19
Lazio (loan)	2026–27	Serie A	4	1	—		—		4	1
Total			295	84	14	6	40	14	349	104

=== International ===
As of match played 3 October 2026

Appearances and goals by national team and year
National team	Year	Apps	Goals
Iceland	2017	1	0
Iceland	2018	9	3
Iceland	2019	1	0
Iceland	2020	7	0
Iceland	2021	11	3
Iceland	2022	4	0
Iceland	2023	2	0
Iceland	2024	2	4
Iceland	2025	9	4
Iceland	2026	3	0
Total		49	14

Scores and results list Iceland's goal tally first, score column indicates score after each Albert goal.

List of international goals scored by Albert Guðmundsson
No.	Date	Venue	Opponent	Score	Result	Competition
1	14 January 2018	Gelora Bung Karno Main Stadium, Jakarta, Indonesia	Indonesia	1–1	4–1	Friendly
2	14 January 2018	Gelora Bung Karno Main Stadium, Jakarta, Indonesia	Indonesia	3–1	4–1	Friendly
3	14 January 2018	Gelora Bung Karno Main Stadium, Jakarta, Indonesia	Indonesia	4–1	4–1	Friendly
4	8 June 2021	Stadion Miejski, Poznań, Poland	Poland	1–0	2–2	Friendly
5	11 October 2021	Laugardalsvöllur, Reykjavík, Iceland	Liechtenstein	2–0	4–0	2022 FIFA World Cup qualification
6	11 October 2021	Laugardalsvöllur, Reykjavík, Iceland	Liechtenstein	3–0	4–0	2022 FIFA World Cup qualification
7	21 March 2024	Szusza Ferenc Stadion, Budapest, Hungary	Israel	1–1	4–1	UEFA Euro 2024 qualifying
8	21 March 2024	Szusza Ferenc Stadion, Budapest, Hungary	Israel	3–1	4–1	UEFA Euro 2024 qualifying
9	21 March 2024	Szusza Ferenc Stadion, Budapest, Hungary	Israel	4–1	4–1	UEFA Euro 2024 qualifying
10	26 March 2024	Wrocław Stadium, Wrocław, Poland	Ukraine	1–0	1–2	UEFA Euro 2024 qualifying
11	5 September 2025	Laugardalsvöllur, Reykjavík, Iceland	Azerbaijan	4–0	5–0	2026 FIFA World Cup qualification
12	10 October 2025	Laugardalsvöllur, Reykjavík, Iceland	Ukraine	2–3	3–5	2026 FIFA World Cup qualification
13	10 October 2025	Laugardalsvöllur, Reykjavík, Iceland	Ukraine	3–3	3–5	2026 FIFA World Cup qualification
14	13 November 2025	Neftçi Arena, Baku, Azerbaijan	Azerbaijan	1–0	2–0	2026 FIFA World Cup qualification

== Honours ==
PSV

- Eredivisie: 2017–18
