= 2019–20 AZ Alkmaar season =

AZ Alkmaar
2019–20 season
- Chairman: René Neelissen
- Head coach: Arne Slot
- Stadium: AFAS Stadion; Cars Jeans Stadion
- Eredivisie: 2nd
- KNVB Cup: Quarter-finals
- UEFA Europa League: Round of 32
- Top goalscorer: League: Myron Boadu (14); All: Myron Boadu (20)
Home colours	Away colours	Third colours

The 2019–20 season was AZ Alkmaar's 53rd season in existence and the club's 22nd consecutive season in the top flight of Dutch football. It covered a period from 1 July 2019 to 30 June 2020. AZ Alkmaar competed in the Eredivisie, the KNVB Cup and the UEFA Europa League.

== Players ==
As of 30 August 2019

Note: Flags indicate national team as defined under FIFA eligibility rules; some limited exceptions apply. Players may hold more than one non-FIFA nationality.

No.	Pos.	Nation	Player
1	GK	NED	Marco Bizot
2	DF	NOR	Jonas Svensson
3	DF	GRE	Pantelis Hatzidiakos
4	DF	NED	Ron Vlaar
5	DF	NED	Thomas Ouwejan
6	MF	NOR	Fredrik Midtsjø
7	FW	NED	Calvin Stengs
8	MF	NED	Teun Koopmeiners (captain)
9	FW	NED	Myron Boadu
10	MF	NED	Dani de Wit
11	FW	MAR	Oussama Idrissi
14	FW	NED	Ferdy Druijf

No.	Pos.	Nation	Player
15	DF	NED	Owen Wijndal
16	GK	NED	Jasper Schendelaar
17	FW	NED	Zakaria Aboukhlal
20	MF	NED	Jordy Clasie
21	MF	NED	Kenzo Goudmijn
22	GK	NED	Rody de Boer
23	DF	NED	Léon Bergsma
24	MF	NED	Tijjani Reijnders
26	DF	JPN	Yukinari Sugawara (on loan from Nagoya Grampus)
28	FW	ISL	Albert Guðmundsson
29	DF	NED	Joris Kramer
30	DF	BEL	Stijn Wuytens

=== Out on loan ===
Note: Flags indicate national team as defined under FIFA eligibility rules; some limited exceptions apply. Players may hold more than one non-FIFA nationality.

No.	Pos.	Nation	Player
—	FW	NED	Jelle Duin ( at FC Volendam until 30 June 2020)
—	FW	NED	Jeremy Helmer ( at De Graafschap until 30 June 2020)
—	MF	NED	Mees Hoedemakers ( at Cambuur until 30 June 2020)

No.	Pos.	Nation	Player
—	FW	NOR	Bjørn Maars Johnsen ( at Rosenborg until 30 June 2020)
—	FW	CZE	Ondřej Mihálik ( at Viktoria Plzeň until 30 June 2020)

== Transfers ==
=== In ===
Date	Position	Player	From	Type	Fee	Ref.
1 July 2019	DF	(Japan) Yukinari Sugawara	(Japan) Nagoya Grampus	Loan	Season	
22 July 2019	MF	(Netherlands) Jordy Clasie	(England) Southampton	Transfer	Free	

=== Out ===
Date	Position	Player	To	Type	Fee	Ref.
1 July 2019	GK	(Netherlands) Nick Olij	(Netherlands) NAC Breda	Transfer	Free	
1 July 2019	MF	(Netherlands) Mats Seuntjens	(Turkey) Gençlerbirliği S.K.	Transfer	Undisclosed	
1 July 2019	MF	(Netherlands) Adam Maher	(Netherlands) FC Utrecht	Transfer	Free	
1 July 2019	GK	(Netherlands) Piet Velthuizen	Released	Transfer	Free	
1 July 2019	DF	(Netherlands) Ricardo van Rhijn	(Netherlands) Sc Heerenveen	Transfer	Free	
1 July 2019	MF	(Netherlands) Jamie Jacobs	(Netherlands) SC Cambuur	Transfer	Undisclosed	
1 July 2019	FW	(Czech Republic) Ondrej Mihalik	(Czech Republic) Viktoria Plzen	Loan	Season with Option	
1 July 2019	MF	(Netherlands) Mees Hoedemakers	(Netherlands) SC Cambuur	Loan	Season with Option	
2 July 2019	MF	(Morocco) Iliass Bel Hassani	(Netherlands) PEC Zwolle	Transfer	Undisclosed	

== Pre-season and friendlies ==
Win Draw Loss

22 June 2019 Friendly	AZ (Netherlands)	3–1	(Belgium) Eendracht Aalst	Dirkshorn, Netherlands
18:00 CEST (UTC+2)				Stadium: Sportpark vv Dirkshorn

29 June 2019 Friendly	AZ (Netherlands)	0–3	(Ukraine) Oleksandriya	Dirkshorn, Netherlands
16:00 CEST (UTC+2)			Hrechyshkin 21' (pen.); Dovhyi 56'; Kovalets 82'	Stadium: Sportpark vv Dirkshorn

3 July 2019 Friendly	AZ (Netherlands)	1–0	(Greece) PAOK	Wenum-Wiesel, Netherlands
19:00 CEST (UTC+2)	Stengs 45'			Stadium: Sportpark Wiesel

6 July 2019 Friendly	AZ (Netherlands)	5–2	(Belgium) Club Brugge	Garderen, Netherlands
16:00 CEST (UTC+2)				Stadium: Sportpark De Westeneng

13 July 2019 Friendly	Telstar (Netherlands)	3–0	(Netherlands) AZ	Velsen-Zuid, Netherlands
17:00 CEST (UTC+2)				Stadium: Rabobank IJmond Stadion

17 July 2019 Friendly	Gent (Belgium)	2–0	(Netherlands) AZ	Ghent, Belgium
20:30 CEST (UTC+2)				Stadium: Ghelamco Arena

27 July 2019 Friendly	AZ (Netherlands)	0–1	(Belgium) Beerschot-Wilrijk	Wijdewormer, Netherlands
11:00 CEST (UTC+2)				Stadium: AFAS Trainingscomplex

10 January 2020 Friendly	KV Mechelen (Belgium)	1–5	(Netherlands) AZ	Oliva, Spain
15:30 CET (UTC+1)	De Camargo 10'		Stengs 17'; De Wit 35'; Idrissi 40'; Druijf 65', 80' (pen.)	Stadium: Oliva Nova Golf & Beach Resort Campo 1

== Competitions ==
=== Overview ===
Competition	First match	Last match	Starting round	Final position	Record							
Competition	First match	Last match	Starting round	Final position	Pld	W	D	L	GF	GA	GD	Win %
Eredivisie	4 August 2019	24 May 2020	Matchday 1	2nd	25	18	2	5	54	17	+37	72.00
KNVB Cup	18 December 2019	12 February 2020	Second round	Quarter-finals	3	2	0	1	6	3	+3	66.67
Europa League	25 July 2019	27 February 2020	Second qualifying round	Round of 32	14	5	7	2	27	13	+14	35.71
Total					42	25	9	8	87	33	+54	59.52

Last updated: 7 March 2020
Source: Soccerway

=== Eredivisie ===
==== League table ====
Pos	Team	Pld	W	D	L	GF	GA	GD	Pts	Qualification or relegation
1	Ajax	25	18	2	5	68	23	+45	56	Qualification for the Champions League group stage
2	AZ	25	18	2	5	54	17	+37	56	Qualification for the Champions League second qualifying round
3	Feyenoord	25	14	8	3	50	35	+15	50	Qualification for the Europa League group stage
4	PSV Eindhoven	26	14	7	5	54	28	+26	49	Qualification for the Europa League third qualifying round
5	Willem II	26	13	5	8	37	34	+3	44	Qualification for the Europa League second qualifying round

Source: eredivisie.nl
Rules for classification: Season in progress: 1) Most points won; 2) Less points lost; 3) Goal difference; 4) Goals scored; 5) Alphabetical order; End of season: 1) Points; 2) Goal difference; 3) Goals scored; 4) Head-to-head points; 5) Head-to-head goal difference; 6) Head-to-head away goals scored; 7) Play-off if relevant for deciding champion, relegation or participating in a European league, otherwise by draw. 8) Penalty shoot-out (only after a play-off)

==== Results summary ====
Overall								Home						Away					
Pld	W	D	L	GF	GA	GD	Pts	W	D	L	GF	GA	GD	W	D	L	GF	GA	GD
25	18	2	5	54	17	+37	56	10	1	2	32	8	+24	8	1	3	22	9	+13

Last updated: 7 March 2020.
Source: Eredivisie

==== Results by round ====
Round	1	2	3	4	5	6	7	8	9	10	11	12	13	14	15	16	17	18	19	20	21	22	23	24	25	26	27	28	29	30	31	32	33	34
Ground	H	A	H	A	H	A	A	H	A	H	H	A	H	A	H	A	H	A	H	A	H	A	H	A	H	A	H	A	H	H	A	H	A	H
Result	W	W	D	L	W	W	W	W	D	L	W	W	W	W	W	W	W	L	L	W	W	C	L	W	W	W	C	C	C	C	C	C	C	C
Position	1	1	2	2	4	3	3	3	3	4	2	2	2	2	2	2	2	2	2	2	2	2	2	2	2	2	2	2	2	2	2	2	2	2

Updated to match(es) played on 7 March 2020. Source: Eredivisie
A = Away; H = Home; W = Win; D = Draw; L = Loss; C = Cancelled

==== Matches ====
The Eredivisie schedule was announced on 14 June 2019. The 2019–20 season was abandoned on 24 April 2020, due to the coronavirus pandemic in the Netherlands.

4 August 2019 1	AZ	4–0	Fortuna Sittard	Alkmaar
20:00 CEST (UTC+2)	Vlaar 53'; Idrissi 55'; Boadu 59'; Sugawara 83'	Report		Stadium: AFAS Stadion; Attendance: 12,858; Referee: Dennis Higler

11 August 2019 2	RKC Waalwijk	0–2	AZ	Waalwijk
14:30 CEST (UTC+2)		Report	Idrissi 35', 48'	Stadium: Mandemakers Stadion; Attendance: 6,023; Referee: Allard Lindhout

18 August 2019 3	AZ	0–0	Groningen	The Hague
16:45 CEST (UTC+2)		Report		Stadium: Cars Jeans Stadion; Attendance: 8,563; Referee: Serdar Gözübüyük

1 September 2019 4	Vitesse	2–1	AZ	Arnhem
16:45 CEST (UTC+2)	Matavž 45+1'; Bero 90+6' (pen.)	Report	Koopmeiners 33' (pen.)	Stadium: GelreDome; Attendance: 13,290; Referee: Dennis Higler

14 September 2019 5	AZ	5–1	Sparta Rotterdam	The Hague
18:30 CEST (UTC+2)	Idrissi 4', 45'; Boadu 16', 33'; Koopmeiners 81'	Report	Harroui 2'	Stadium: Cars Jeans Stadion; Attendance: 8,000; Referee: Danny Makkelie

22 September 2019 6	ADO Den Haag	0–1	AZ	The Hague
16:45 CEST (UTC+2)		Report	Koopmeiners 75'	Stadium: Cars Jeans Stadion; Attendance: 12,091; Referee: Allard Lindhout

26 September 2019 7	Feyenoord	0–3	AZ	Rotterdam
20:00 CEST (UTC+2)		Report	Boadu 39'; Stengs 50'; Idrissi 83'	Stadium: De Kuip; Attendance: 35,000; Referee: Jochem Kamphuis

29 September 2019 8	AZ	2–0	Heracles Almelo	The Hague
16:45 CEST (UTC+2)	Koopmeiners 55'; Stengs 88'	Report		Stadium: Cars Jeans Stadion; Attendance: 7,241; Referee: Pol van Boekel

6 October 2019 9	Willem II	1–1	AZ	Tilburg
16:45 CEST (UTC+2)	Köhlert 31'	Report	Koopmeiners 22'	Stadium: Koning Willem II Stadion; Attendance: 12,707; Referee: Dennis Higler

19 October 2019 10	AZ	2–4	Heerenveen	The Hague
18:30 CEST (UTC+2)	Vlaar 31'; Stengs 48'	Report	Botman 7'; Kongolo 36'; Odgaard 45+3'; Koopmeiners 63' (o.g.)	Stadium: Cars Jeans Stadion; Attendance: 7,648; Referee: Björn Kuipers

27 October 2019 11	PSV	0–4	AZ	Eindhoven
14:30 CET (UTC+1)	Thomas (red card) 22'	Report	Wijndal (yellow card) 33'; Boadu 45', 46'; Svensson 71'; De Wit 76'	Stadium: Philips Stadion; Attendance: 34,000; Referee: Pol van Boekel

2 November 2019 12	AZ	3–0	Twente	The Hague
20:45 CET (UTC+1)	Hatzidiakos 45+2'; De Wit 55'; Boadu 78'	Report		Stadium: Cars Jeans Stadion; Attendance: 4,689; Referee: Danny Makkelie

10 November 2019 13	AZ	3–0	Emmen	The Hague
20:00 CET (UTC+1)	Koopmeiners 36' (pen.); Boadu 45'; Stengs 58'	Report		Stadium: Cars Jeans Stadion; Attendance: 7,000; Referee: Siemen Mulder

23 November 2019 14	Utrecht	0–3	AZ	Utrecht
18:30 CET (UTC+1)		Report	Koopmeiners 24'; Idrissi 31'; Boadu 50'	Stadium: Stadion Galgenwaard; Attendance: 22,401; Referee: Björn Kuipers

1 December 2019 15	AZ	1–0	VVV-Venlo	The Hague
16:45 CET (UTC+1)	Sugawara 39'	Report		Stadium: Cars Jeans Stadion; Attendance: 6,007; Referee: Martin van den Kerkhof

7 December 2019 16	PEC Zwolle	0–3	AZ	Zwolle
20:45 CET (UTC+1)		Report	Boadu 15'; Idrissi 42', 65'	Stadium: MAC^{3}PARK Stadion; Attendance: 13,708; Referee: Serdar Gözübüyük

15 December 2019 17	AZ	1–0	Ajax	Alkmaar
16:45 CET (UTC+1)	Svensson (yellow card) 59'; Clasie (yellow card) 80'; Idrissi (yellow card) 86'; Boadu 90'	Report	Ziyech (yellow card) 69'	Stadium: AFAS Stadion; Attendance: 17,002; Referee: Danny Makkelie

21 December 2019 18	Sparta Rotterdam	3–0	AZ	Rotterdam
19:45 CET (UTC+1)	Auassar 18'; Smeets 29'; Dervişoğlu 57' (pen.)	Report		Stadium: Sparta Stadion Het Kasteel; Attendance: 10,031; Referee: Kevin Blom

18 January 2020 19	AZ	1–3	Willem II	Alkmaar
20:45 CET (UTC+1)	Wuytens (yellow card) 11'; Idrissi 27'; Wijndal (yellow card) 71'	Report	Peters (yellow card) 56'; Köhlert 65'; Pavlidis 78'; Ndayishimiye 83'	Stadium: AFAS Stadion; Attendance: 15,442; Referee: Björn Kuipers

25 January 2020 20	Heerenveen	1–2	AZ	Heerenveen
18:30 CET (UTC+1)	Veerman (yellow card) 28'; Ejuke 69'	Report	De Wit 35'; Boadu 72'; Koopmeiners (yellow card) 76'	Stadium: Abe Lenstra Stadion; Attendance: 19,638; Referee: Kevin Blom

31 January 2020 21	AZ	4–0	RKC Waalwijk	Alkmaar
20:00 CET (UTC+1)	Idrissi 29', 51'; Boadu 36'; Stengs 65'	Report	Mulder (yellow card) 4'	Stadium: AFAS Stadion; Attendance: 14,712; Referee: Serdar Gözübüyük

15 February 2020 23	Twente	2–0	AZ	Enschede
18:30 CET (UTC+1)	Aburjania 25'; Menig 30'; Busquets (yellow card) 65'	Report	Idrissi (yellow card) 38'	Stadium: De Grolsch Veste; Attendance: 27,300; Referee: Allard Lindhout

23 February 2020 24	AZ	2–0	PEC Zwolle	Alkmaar
14:30 CET (UTC+1)	Koopmeiners 54' (pen.), 60' (pen.)	Report	Zetterer (yellow card) 42'; Paal (yellow card) 59'	Stadium: AFAS Stadion; Attendance: 15,306; Referee: Jochem Kamphuis

1 March 2020 25	Ajax	0–2	AZ	Amsterdam
20:00 CET (UTC+1)		Report	Boadu 4'; Wijndal (yellow card) 67'; Idrissi 74'; Leeuwin (yellow card) 79'	Stadium: Johan Cruyff Arena; Attendance: 52,707; Referee: Serdar Gözübüyük

7 March 2020 26	AZ	4–0	ADO Den Haag	Alkmaar
18:30 CET (UTC+1)	Clasie (yellow card) 2'; Koopmeiners 13' (pen.), 84'; Wijndal 19'; Druijf 89'	Report	Meijers (yellow card) 61'; Băluță (yellow card) 78'; Necid (yellow card) 90+1'	Stadium: AFAS Stadion; Attendance: 16,117; Referee: Dennis Higler

15 March 2020 27	VVV-Venlo	Cancelled	AZ	Venlo
16:45 CET (UTC+1)		Report		Stadium: De Koel
Note: Match was initially scheduled for 15 March, but cancelled due to the COVID-19 pandemic in the Netherlands.

22 March 2020 28	Groningen	Cancelled	AZ	Groningen
16:45 CET (UTC+1)				Stadium: Hitachi Capital Mobility Stadion
Note: Match was initially scheduled for 22 March, cancelled due to the COVID-19 pandemic in the Netherlands.

4 April 2020 29	AZ	Cancelled	Vitesse	Alkmaar
20:45 CEST (UTC+2)				Stadium: AFAS Stadion
Note: Match was initially scheduled for 4 April, but cancelled due to the COVID-19 pandemic in the Netherlands.

8 April 2020 22	AZ	Cancelled	Feyenoord	Alkmaar
18:45 CEST (UTC+2)				Stadium: AFAS Stadion
Note: Match was initially scheduled for 8 April, but cancelled due to the COVID-19 pandemic in the Netherlands.

11 April 2020 30	Heracles Almelo	Cancelled	AZ	Almelo
19:45 CEST (UTC+2)				Stadium: Polman Stadion
Note: Match was initially scheduled for 11 April, but cancelled due to the COVID-19 pandemic in the Netherlands.

21 April 2020 31	AZ	Cancelled	PSV	Alkmaar
18:30 CEST (UTC+2)				Stadium: AFAS Stadion
Note: Match was initially scheduled for 21 April, but cancelled due to the COVID-19 pandemic in the Netherlands.

25 April 2020 32	Fortuna Sittard	Cancelled	AZ	Sittard
18:30 CEST (UTC+2)				Stadium: Fortuna Sittard Stadion
Note: Match was initially scheduled for 25 April, but cancelled due to the COVID-19 pandemic in the Netherlands.

3 May 2020 33	AZ	Cancelled	Utrecht	Alkmaar
14:30 CEST (UTC+2)				Stadium: AFAS Stadion
Note: Match was initially scheduled for 3 May, but cancelled due to the COVID-19 pandemic in the Netherlands.

10 May 2020 34	Emmen	Cancelled	AZ	Emmen
14:30 CEST (UTC+2)				Stadium: De Oude Meerdijk
Note: Match was initially scheduled for 10 May, but cancelled due to the COVID-19 pandemic in the Netherlands.

=== KNVB Cup ===
18 December 2019 Second round	AZ	3–0	Groene Ster	Alkmaar
19:45 CET (UTC+1)	Clasie (red card) 55'; Druijf 60'; Svensson 62'; De Wit 67'	Report		Stadium: AFAS Stadion; Attendance: 17,082; Referee: Erwin Blank

21 January 2020 Round of 16	TOP Oss	0–2	AZ	Oss
18:30 CET (UTC+1)	Van den Herik (yellow card) 52'; Rommens (yellow card) 67'	Report	De Wit 36'; Svensson (yellow card) 47'; Koopmeiners 54' (pen.)	Stadium: Frans Heesen Stadion; Attendance: 2,615; Referee: Laurens Gerrets

12 February 2020 Quarter-finals	AZ	1–3	NAC Breda	Alkmaar
18:30 CET (UTC+1)	Idrissi (yellow card) 56', (goal) 65'	Report	El Allouchi 35'; Schouten 60'; Noblejas 86'; Verschueren (yellow card) 89'	Stadium: AFAS Stadion; Referee: Pol van Boekel

=== UEFA Europa League ===
==== Second qualifying round ====
25 July 2019 First leg	AZ (Netherlands)	0–0	(Sweden) BK Häcken	Alkmaar, Netherlands
20:30 CEST (UTC+2)	Wijndal (yellow card) 18'	Report	Ekpolo (yellow card) 43'; Ghani (yellow card) 60'	Stadium: AFAS Stadion; Attendance: 11,492; Referee: Serhiy Boyko (Ukraine)

1 August 2019 Second leg	BK Häcken (Sweden)	0–3 (0–3 agg.)	(Netherlands) AZ	Gothenburg, Sweden
18:30 CEST (UTC+2)	Lindgren (yellow card) 39'	Report	Wuytens (yellow card) 17'; Stengs (yellow card) 39', (goal) 56'; Boadu 42'; Idrissi 67'	Stadium: Bravida Arena; Attendance: 3,845; Referee: Frank Schneider (France)

==== Third qualifying round ====
8 August 2019 First leg	Mariupol (Ukraine)	0–0	(Netherlands) AZ	Odesa, Ukraine
20:00 EEST (UTC+3)	Chekh (yellow card) 26'; Polehenko (yellow card) 90+3'	Report	Svensson (yellow card) 25'; Boadu (yellow card) 60'	Stadium: Chornomorets Stadium; Attendance: 4,426; Referee: Michael Tykgaard (Denmark)

15 August 2019 Second leg	AZ (Netherlands)	4–0 (4–0 agg.)	(Ukraine) Mariupol	The Hague, Netherlands (Note: After a roof collapse on 10 August 2019 at their regular stadium, AFAS Stadion, Alkmaar, AZ's third qualifying round home match was moved to Cars Jeans Stadion, The Hague. Their play-off round home match was moved to De Grolsch Veste, Enschede.)
20:30 CEST (UTC+2)	Idrissi (yellow card) 18'; Stengs 20'; Svensson (yellow card) 40'; Ouwejan 44'; Wuytens 62'; Midtsjø (yellow card) 87'; Yavorskyi 90' (o.g.)	Report	Myshnyov (yellow card) 68'	Stadium: Cars Jeans Stadion; Attendance: 8,018; Referee: Bartosz Frankowski (Poland)

==== Play-off round ====
22 August 2019 First leg	AZ (Netherlands)	1–1	(Belgium) Antwerp	Enschede, Netherlands
20:30 CEST (UTC+2)	Koopmeiners (yellow card) 25'; Stengs (yellow card) 49'; Boadu 82'; Vlaar (yellow card) 85'; Idrissi (yellow card) 90+3'	Report	Batubinsika 38'; Buta (yellow card) 47' (yellow-red card) 73'; Mbokani (yellow card) 63'; Bolat (yellow card) 88'; Lamkel Zé (yellow card) 90+3'	Stadium: De Grolsch Veste; Attendance: 4,014; Referee: Srđan Jovanović (Serbia)

29 August 2019 Second leg	Antwerp (Belgium)	1–4 (a.e.t.) (2–5 agg.)	(Netherlands) AZ	Brussels, Belgium
19:30 CEST (UTC+2)	Rodrigues (yellow card) 26'; Mbokani (yellow card) 32' (yellow-red card) 35'; Lamkel Zé (yellow card) 51' (yellow-red card) 74', (goal) 73'; Seck (yellow card) 90+4'; Bolat (yellow card) 97'; Haroun (yellow card) 98'; Batubinsika (yellow card) 101'	Report	Bizot (yellow card) 36'; Boadu (yellow card) 40'; Idrissi (yellow card) 86'; Stengs 90', (yellow card) 97'; Koopmeiners (yellow card) 91', (goal) 102' (pen.); Druijf 96'; Wijndal (yellow card) 97'; Guðmundsson 113'	Stadium: King Baudouin Stadium; Attendance: 19,786; Referee: Anastasios Sidiropoulos (Greece)

==== Group stage ====
Pos	Team	Pld	W	D	L	GF	GA	GD	Pts	Qualification	MUN	AZ	PAR	AST
1	(England) Manchester United	6	4	1	1	10	2	+8	13	Advance to knockout phase	—	4–0	3–0	1–0
2	(Netherlands) AZ	6	2	3	1	15	8	+7	9	Advance to knockout phase	0–0	—	2–2	6–0
3	(Serbia) Partizan	6	2	2	2	10	10	0	8		0–1	2–2	—	4–1
4	(Kazakhstan) Astana	6	1	0	5	4	19	−15	3		2–1	0–5	1–2	—

Source: UEFA
Rules for classification: Group stage tiebreakers

19 September 2019 1	Partizan (Serbia)	2–2	(Netherlands) AZ	Belgrade, Serbia
21:00 CEST (UTC+2)	Zdjelar (yellow card) 26'; Natkho 42' (pen.), 61'	Report	Stengs 13'; Svensson (red card) 27'; Midtsjø (yellow card) 43'; Boadu 67'	Stadium: Partizan Stadium; Attendance: 22,564; Referee: Marco Guida (Italy)

3 October 2019 2	AZ (Netherlands)	0–0	(England) Manchester United	The Hague, Netherlands (Note: AZ played their home matches at Cars Jeans Stadion, The Hague, instead of their regular home stadium AFAS Stadion, Alkmaar due to the latter's roof collapse.)
18:55 CEST (UTC+2)		Report	Dalot (yellow card) 90+1'	Stadium: Cars Jeans Stadion; Attendance: 13,863; Referee: Gediminas Mažeika (Lithuania)

24 October 2019 3	AZ (Netherlands)	6–0	(Kazakhstan) Astana	The Hague, Netherlands
18:55 CEST (UTC+2)	Koopmeiners 39' (pen.), 83' (pen.); Boadu 43'; Stengs 77'; Sugawara 85'; Idrissi 90+2'	Report	Shomko (yellow card) 38'; Mayewski (yellow card) 41'; Postnikov (yellow card) 83'	Stadium: Cars Jeans Stadion; Attendance: 8,123; Referee: Enea Jorgji (Albania)

7 November 2019 4	Astana (Kazakhstan)	0–5	(Netherlands) AZ	Nur-Sultan, Kazakhstan
21:50 ALMT (UTC+6)	Postnikov (yellow card) 75'; Pertsukh (yellow card) 79'	Report	Boadu 29', 77'; De Wit (yellow card) 33'; Midtsjø 52'; Idrissi 57'; Hatzidiakos 76'	Stadium: Astana Arena; Attendance: 11,584; Referee: Mads-Kristoffer Kristoffersen (Denmark)

28 November 2019 5	AZ (Netherlands)	2–2	(Serbia) Partizan	The Hague, Netherlands
18:55 CET (UTC+1)	Stengs (yellow card) 38'; Koopmeiners (yellow card) 54'; Boadu (yellow card) 54' (yellow-red card) 84'; Midtsjø (yellow card) 85'; Druijf 85', 90+2'; Bizot (yellow card) 90+8'	Report	Asano 16'; Soumah 27'; Stojković (yellow card) 77'; Natkho (yellow card) 90'; Brežančić (yellow card) 90+7'	Stadium: Cars Jeans Stadion; Attendance: 9,092; Referee: Daniel Stefański (Poland)

12 December 2019 6	Manchester United (England)	4–0	(Netherlands) AZ	Manchester, England
20:00 GMT (UTC±0)	Young 53'; Greenwood 58', 64'; Mata 62' (pen.); Laird (yellow card) 82'	Report	Clasie (yellow card) 29'; Midtsjø (yellow card) 58'; Koopmeiners (yellow card) 84'	Stadium: Old Trafford; Attendance: 65,773; Referee: Sandro Schärer (Switzerland)

==== Knockout phase ====
===== Round of 32 =====
20 February 2020 First leg	AZ (Netherlands)	1–1	(Austria) LASK	Alkmaar, Netherlands
21:00 CET (UTC+1)	Stengs (yellow card) 31'; Boadu (yellow card) 34'; De Wit (yellow card) 71'; Koopmeiners 86' (pen.)	Report	Raguž 26'; Renner (yellow card) 29'; Filipović (yellow card) 42'; Holland (yellow card) 86'	Stadium: AFAS Stadion; Attendance: 12,526; Referee: Mattias Gestranius (Finland)

27 February 2020 Second leg	LASK (Austria)	2–0 (3–1 agg.)	(Netherlands) AZ	Linz, Austria
18:55 CET (UTC+1)	Wiesinger (yellow card) 37' (yellow-red card) 88'; Raguž 44' (pen.), 50'; Filipović (yellow card) 63'	Report	Wijndal (yellow card) 24'	Stadium: Linzer Stadion; Attendance: 12,855; Referee: Srđan Jovanović (Serbia)

== Statistics ==
=== Appearances and goals ===
No.	Pos	Nat	Player	Total		Eredivisie		KNVB Cup		Europa League	
No.	Pos	Nat	Player	Apps	Goals	Apps	Goals	Apps	Goals	Apps	Goals
Goalkeepers
1	GK	(Netherlands) NED	Marco Bizot	41	0	24	0	3	0	14	0
16	GK	(Netherlands) NED	Jasper Schendelaar	0	0	0	0	0	0	0	0
22	GK	(Netherlands) NED	Rody de Boer	2	0	1+1	0	0	0	0	0
Defenders
2	DF	(Norway) NOR	Jonas Svensson	38	2	23	1	3	1	12	0
3	DF	(Greece) GRE	Pantelis Chatzidiakos	20	2	7+4	1	0	0	4+5	1
4	DF	(Netherlands) NED	Ron Vlaar	13	2	10	2	0	0	1+2	0
5	DF	(Netherlands) NED	Thomas Ouwejan	19	1	4+6	0	2+1	0	4+2	1
15	DF	(Netherlands) NED	Owen Wijndal	39	1	24	1	1	0	14	0
26	DF	(Japan) JPN	Yukinari Sugawara	28	3	5+11	2	0+1	0	2+9	1
27	DF	(Netherlands) NED	Ramon Leeuwin	8	0	4+1	0	1	0	2	0
29	DF	(Netherlands) NED	Joris Kramer	1	0	0+1	0	0	0	0	0
30	DF	(Belgium) BEL	Stijn Wuytens	35	1	21	0	3	0	11	1
Midfielders
6	MF	(Norway) NOR	Fredrik Midtsjø	39	1	22+1	0	3	0	13	1
8	MF	(Netherlands) NED	Teun Koopmeiners	42	16	25	11	3	1	14	4
10	MF	(Netherlands) NED	Dani de Wit	33	5	19+3	3	3	2	8	0
18	MF	(Norway) NOR	Håkon Evjen	6	0	1+2	0	0+1	0	1+1	0
20	MF	(Netherlands) NED	Jordy Clasie	32	0	10+8	0	2+1	0	3+8	0
21	MF	(Netherlands) NED	Kenzo Goudmijn	2	0	0+1	0	0+1	0	0	0
34	MF	(Netherlands) NED	Mohamed Taabouni	1	0	0	0	0+1	0	0	0
Forwards
7	FW	(Netherlands) NED	Calvin Stengs	42	10	24+1	5	2+1	0	14	5
9	FW	(Netherlands) NED	Myron Boadu	39	20	24	14	2	0	13	6
11	FW	(Morocco) MAR	Oussama Idrissi	42	17	25	13	3	1	13+1	3
14	FW	(Netherlands) NED	Ferdy Druijf	21	5	1+11	1	1+1	1	0+7	3
17	FW	(Netherlands) NED	Zakaria Aboukhlal	15	0	0+12	0	1+1	0	0+1	0
28	FW	(Iceland) ISL	Albert Guðmundsson	8	1	1+3	0	0	0	1+3	1
Players transferred out during the season
10	MF	(Netherlands) NED	Guus Til	2	0	0	0	0	0	2	0
19	MF	(Norway) NOR	Bjørn Maars Johnsen	1	0	0	0	0	0	0+1	0

Last updated: 7 March 2020
Source: Competitions
