= List of Dutch football transfers winter 2017–18 =

This is a list of Dutch football transfers for the 2017–18 winter transfer window by club. Only transfers of clubs in the Eredivisie are included.

== Eredivisie ==
=== ADO Den Haag ===
In:

No.	Pos.	Nation	Player

Out:

No.	Pos.	Nation	Player

=== Ajax ===
In:

No.	Pos.	Nation	Player
--	DF	NED	Perr Schuurs (from Fortuna Sittard)

Out:

No.	Pos.	Nation	Player
--	DF	NED	Perr Schuurs (on loan to Fortuna Sittard)

=== AZ ===
In:

No.	Pos.	Nation	Player

Out:

No.	Pos.	Nation	Player
32	DF	NED	Levi Opdam (on loan to Go Ahead Eagles)

=== Excelsior ===
In:

No.	Pos.	Nation	Player

Out:

No.	Pos.	Nation	Player

=== Feyenoord ===
In:

No.	Pos.	Nation	Player

Out:

No.	Pos.	Nation	Player

Van Persie (from Turkey)

=== Groningen ===
In:

No.	Pos.	Nation	Player

Out:

No.	Pos.	Nation	Player
--	FW	NED	Danny Hoesen (to (United States) San Jose Earthquakes, previously on loan)
--	FW	NED	Oussama Idrissi (to AZ Alkmaar)

=== Heerenveen ===
In:

No.	Pos.	Nation	Player

Out:

No.	Pos.	Nation	Player

=== Heracles Almelo ===
In:

No.	Pos.	Nation	Player

Out:

No.	Pos.	Nation	Player

=== NAC Breda ===
In:

No.	Pos.	Nation	Player

Out:

No.	Pos.	Nation	Player
27	MF	NED	Thomas Marijnissen (retired)

=== PEC Zwolle ===
In:

No.	Pos.	Nation	Player

Out:

No.	Pos.	Nation	Player

=== PSV ===
In:

No.	Pos.	Nation	Player
22	FW	ARG	Maximiliano Romero (from (Argentina) Vélez Sarsfield)

Out:

No.	Pos.	Nation	Player

=== Roda JC ===
In:

No.	Pos.	Nation	Player

Out:

No.	Pos.	Nation	Player

=== Sparta Rotterdam ===
In:

No.	Pos.	Nation	Player

Out:

No.	Pos.	Nation	Player

=== Twente ===
In:

No.	Pos.	Nation	Player

Out:

No.	Pos.	Nation	Player

=== Utrecht ===
In:

No.	Pos.	Nation	Player

Out:

No.	Pos.	Nation	Player

=== Vitesse ===
In:

No.	Pos.	Nation	Player

Out:

No.	Pos.	Nation	Player

=== VVV-Venlo ===
In:

No.	Pos.	Nation	Player

Out:

No.	Pos.	Nation	Player

=== Willem II ===
In:

No.	Pos.	Nation	Player

Out:

No.	Pos.	Nation	Player
