= Kristbjörg Helga Ingadóttir =

Icelandic association football player

Personal information
- Date of birth: 25 December 1975 (age 50)
- Position: Midfielder

Senior career*
| Years | Team | Apps | (Gls) |
| 1992–1996 | Valur | 54 | (28) |
- * Club domestic league appearances and goals

Kristbjörg Helga Ingadóttir is an Icelandic former footballer and coach.

== Personal life ==
Albert Guðmundsson is her son.
