= Ramon Leeuwin =

Surinamese footballer (born 1987)

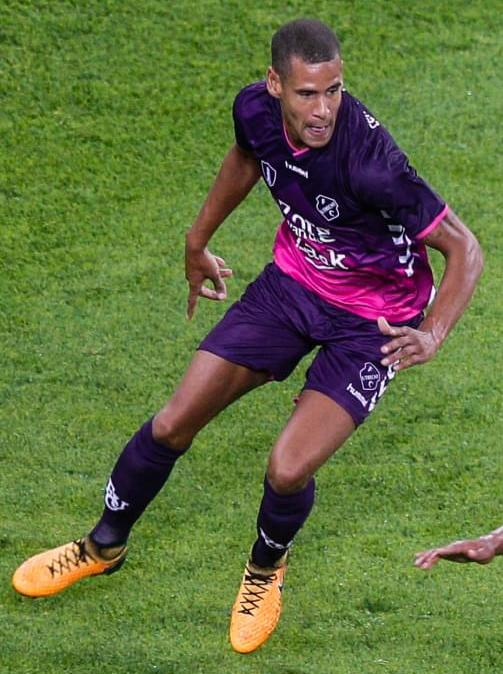
- Leeuwin playing for FC Utrecht in 2017

Personal information
- Full name: Ramon Stanley Remy Leeuwin
- Date of birth: 1 September 1987 (age 39)
- Place of birth: Amsterdam, Netherlands
- Height: 1.87 m (6 ft 2 in)
- Position: Centre-back

Team information
- Current team: TEC
- Number: 3

Youth career
- SV Almere
- FC Omniworld
- Utrecht

Senior career*
Years	Team	Apps	(Gls)
2006–2008	Utrecht	2	(0)
2008–2010	AGOVV	68	(3)
2010–2013	ADO Den Haag	49	(1)
2013–2014	Cambuur	32	(3)
2014–2018	Utrecht	118	(2)
2018–2020	OB	40	(2)
2020–2021	AZ	12	(0)
2021–2022	Almere City	32	(1)
2022–	TEC	24	(1)

International career^{‡}
2021–	Suriname	3	(0)
- * Club domestic league appearances and goals as of 26 March 2023 ‡ National team caps and goals as of 9 June 2021

Ramon Stanley Remy Leeuwin (Dutch pronunciation: [ˈraːmɔn ˈleːu.ɪn]; born 1 September 1987) is a Surinamese professional footballer who plays as a centre-back for SV TEC. Born in the Netherlands, he plays for the Suriname national team.

== Career ==
Leeuwin is a defender who was born in Amsterdam and made his debut in professional football for FC Utrecht in the 2006–07 season. He later played for AGOVV, ADO Den Haag and Cambuur before returning to Utrecht in June 2014.

In August 2018, he signed a two-and-a-half-year contract with Danish Superliga club OB. Following his stint in Denmark, he signed a one-and-a-half-year contract at AZ.

On 1 July 2021, Leeuwin joined Almere City, where he signed a one-year deal. After one season, he left professional football and joined Tweede Divisie club TEC.

== International career ==
Born in the Netherlands, Leeuwin is of Surinamese descent. In March 2021, he has been called up to the national squad of Suriname by coach Dean Gorré after receiving the green light from FIFA to call-up Dutch origin players including several that currently play in the Netherlands. He made his debut for Suriname national football team on 24 March 2021 in a World Cup qualifier against the Cayman Islands.

== Career statistics ==
As of match played on 6 May 2022

Appearances and goals by club, season and competition
Club	Season	League			Cup		League Cup		Other		Total	
Club	Season	Division	Apps	Goals	Apps	Goals	Apps	Goals	Apps	Goals	Apps	Goals
Utrecht	2007–08	Eredivisie	2	0	0	0	—		—		2	0
AGOVV	2008–09	Eerste Divisie	31	2	1	0	—		—		32	2
AGOVV	2009–10	Eerste Divisie	36	1	1	0	—		2 (Note: Appearance(s) in the Promotion play-offs)	0	39	1
AGOVV	2010–11	Eerste Divisie	1	0	0	0	—		—		1	0
AGOVV	Total		68	3	2	0	0	0	2	0	72	3
ADO Den Haag	2010–11	Eredivisie	34	1	2	0	—		—		36	1
ADO Den Haag	2011–12	Eredivisie	11	0	0	0	—		4 (Note: Appearance(s) in the UEFA Europa League)	0	15	0
ADO Den Haag	2012–13	Eredivisie	4	0	0	0	—		—		4	0
ADO Den Haag	Total		49	1	2	0	0	0	4	0	55	1
Cambuur	2013–14	Eredivisie	32	3	3	1	—		—		35	4
Utrecht	2014–15	Eredivisie	27	0	0	0	—		—		27	0
Utrecht	2015–16	Eredivisie	31	1	6	1	—		—		37	2
Utrecht	2016–17	Eredivisie	36	1	4	1	—		—		40	2
Utrecht	2017–18	Eredivisie	29	1	0	0	—		4	0	28	0
Utrecht	2018–19	Eredivisie	1	0	0	0	—		0	0	1	0
Utrecht	Total		124	2	10	2	0	0	4	0	138	4
OB Odense	2018–19	Danish Superliga	23	2	3	0	—		—		26	2
OB Odense	2019–20	Danish Superliga	17	0	2	0	—		—		19	0
OB Odense	Total		41	2	5	0	0	0	0	0	45	2
AZ	2019–20	Eredivisie	5	0	1	0	—		2	0	8	0
AZ	2020–21	Eredivisie	7	0	0	0	—		3 (Note: One appearance in UEFA Champions League, two in UEFA Europa League)	0	10	0
AZ	Total		12	0	1	0	0	0	5	0	18	0
Almere City	2021–22	Eerste Divisie	32	1	1	0	—		—		33	1
TEC	2022–23	Tweede Divisie	0	0	0	0	—		—		0	0
Career totals			360	12	24	3	0	0	15	0	399	15
