= Rody de Boer =

Dutch footballer (born 1997)

Personal information
- Date of birth: 22 August 1997 (age 29)
- Place of birth: The Hague, Netherlands
- Height: 1.91 m (6 ft 3 in)
- Position: Goalkeeper

Team information
- Current team: AaB
- Number: 22

Youth career
- Forum Sport
- ADO Den Haag

Senior career*
Years	Team	Apps	(Gls)
2015–2017	ADO Den Haag	0	(0)
2017–2018	Telstar	37	(0)
2018–2021	Jong AZ	25	(0)
2018–2021	AZ	2	(0)
2020–2021	→ De Graafschap (loan)	36	(0)
2021–2023	Roda JC	45	(0)
2023–	AaB	10	(0)

International career
2014–2015	Netherlands U18	2	(0)
2016–2018	Netherlands U20	7	(0)
- * Club domestic league appearances and goals as of 3 December 2024

Rody de Boer (Dutch pronunciation: [ˈroːdi də ˈbuːr]; born 22 August 1997) is a Dutch professional footballer who plays as a goalkeeper for Danish Superliga club AaB.

== Club career ==
=== Telstar ===
De Boer played youth football for ADO Den Haag and was fourth and third on the goalkeepers' depth-chart between 2014 and 2017. He failed to make his professional debut for the club.

On 26 May 2017, De Boer joined Eerste Divisie club Telstar where he signed a two-year contract. He made his senior debut for the club on 18 August 2017 in a game against FC Eindhoven, starting in a 2–2 draw. During his one season at Telstar, he kept 11 clean sheets in 37 appearances and was rumoured to Premier League club AFC Bournemouth and Bundesliga club FC Augsburg following his impressive season.

=== AZ ===
De Boer moved to Eredivisie club AZ for undisclosed fee on 15 June 2018, signing a four-year contract. He became the backup to starter Marco Bizot, and therefore mainly played for Jong AZ in the Eerste Divisie. He would however pick up a serious shoulder injury in August 2018, sidelining him for several months.

He made his first-team debut for AZ on 21 December 2019 in a 3–0 away loss to Sparta Rotterdam. He replaced Dani de Wit in the 8th minute after Bizot had been sent off. He made his first start for the club in the following league game due to Bizot being suspended, in a 3–1 home loss to Willem II.

On 10 June 2020, De Boer was sent on a one-season loan to Eerste Divisie side De Graafschap.

=== Roda JC ===
On 6 July 2021, De Boer signed a three-year contract with Roda JC Kerkrade. He made his debut for the club on 7 August 2021, starting against former club De Graafschap and keeping a clean sheet in a 3–0 away win. He was the team's starter in goal during the 2021–22 season, keeping 12 clean sheets in 41 total appearances, and Roda were knocked out of promotion play-offs by Excelsior on 14 May 2022.

De Boer also started the 2022–23 season in goal for Roda, but lost his place in goal on the fifth matchday to newcomer Moritz Nicolas who was loaned in from Borussia Mönchengladbach.

He also lost his place in goal early in the 2023–24 season, with Koen Bucker arriving from Heracles Almelo in mid-August 2023 to immediately become the starter.

=== AaB ===
On 22 August 2023, Roda JC announced De Boer's departure to recently relegated Danish 1st Division club AaB. This was confirmed by the Danish side on 25 August, who signed him to a two-year contract. He made his debut for the club in the second round of the Danish Cup, keeping a clean sheet in a 6–0 win over VRI.

== International career ==
De Boer is a youth international for his country, making his first selection to the Netherlands under-18 on 5 November 2014 under coach Maarten Stekelenburg.

On 4 September 2016, De Boer made his debut for the Netherlands under-20s, starting in goal in a 1–1 friendly draw against Czech Republic.

== Career statistics ==
As of match played 26 September 2023

Appearances and goals by club, season and competition
Club	Season	League			National cup		Other		Total	
Club	Season	Division	Apps	Goals	Apps	Goals	Apps	Goals	Apps	Goals
Telstar	2017–18	Eerste Divisie	37	0	0	0	2 (Note: Appearances in Eerste Divisie playoffs)	0	39	0
Jong AZ	2018–19	Eerste Divisie	8	0	—		—		8	0
Jong AZ	2019–20	Eerste Divisie	17	0	—		—		17	0
Jong AZ	Total		25	0	—		—		25	0
AZ	2018–19	Eredivisie	0	0	0	0	0	0	0	0
AZ	2019–20	Eredivisie	2	0	0	0	0	0	2	0
AZ	Total		2	0	0	0	0	0	2	0
De Graafschap (loan)	2020–21	Eerste Divisie	36	0	2	0	1	0	39	0
Roda JC	2021–22	Eerste Divisie	38	0	1	0	2	0	41	0
Roda JC	2022–23	Eerste Divisie	6	0	1	0	—		7	0
Roda JC	2023–24	Eerste Divisie	1	0	—		—		1	0
Roda JC	Total		45	0	2	0	2	0	49	0
AaB	2023–24	Danish 1st Division	1	0	2	0	—		3	0
Career total			146	0	6	0	5	0	157	0
