= Thomas Ouwejan =

Dutch footballer (born 1996)

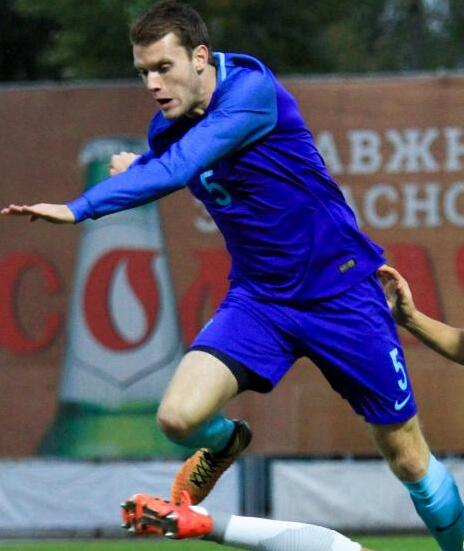
- Ouwejan with Netherlands U21 in 2017

Personal information
- Full name: Thomas Ouwejan
- Date of birth: 30 September 1996 (age 30)
- Place of birth: Alkmaar, Netherlands
- Height: 1.83 m (6 ft 0 in)
- Position: Left-back

Team information
- Current team: Machida Zelvia
- Number: 2

Youth career
- 2000–2007: De Foresters
- 2007–2015: AZ

Senior career*
Years	Team	Apps	(Gls)
2015–2022	AZ	81	(2)
2016–2017	Jong AZ	8	(0)
2020–2021	→ Udinese (loan)	15	(0)
2021–2022	→ Schalke 04 (loan)	28	(3)
2022–2024	Schalke 04	45	(2)
2024–2026	NEC	35	(3)
2026–	Machida Zelvia	7	(0)

International career
2012–2013	Netherlands U17	5	(0)
2015	Netherlands U19	3	(0)
2015–2016	Netherlands U20	8	(0)
2016–2018	Netherlands U21	12	(0)
- * Club domestic league appearances and goals as of 8 November 2026

Thomas Ouwejan (Dutch pronunciation: [ˈtoːmɑs ˈʌuəjɑn]; born 30 September 1996) is a Dutch professional footballer who plays as a left-back for J1 League club Machida Zelvia.

== Career ==
=== AZ ===
Ouwejan joined the AZ youth academy from childhood club De Foresters in 2007. On 10 December 2015, he made his first appearance for the club, starting in a UEFA Europa League match against Athletic Bilbao. He was replaced in the 75th minute for Pantelis Hatzidiakos, another debuting player. Three days later, Ouwejan also made his Eredivisie debut in a game against PEC Zwolle. That season, he also came to 16 appearances and two goals for the reserve team, Jong AZ. In addition, he appeared once in the KNVB Cup and three times in the Eredivisie; with AZ finishing fourth and qualifying for the UEFA Europa League qualifying round.

The following season, he played once for the reserve team and 16 times for the first team in all competitions. In the following play-off games for participation in the Europa League preliminary round, AZ reached the final, but eventually lost to FC Utrecht on penalties.

In the 2017–18 season, Ouwejan became a regular starter and appeared in six matches in the KNVB Cup and 31 matches in the Eredivisie. AZ reached the final of the cup that year, in which they lost to Feyenoord. In the Eredivisie, AZ took third place. He continued as a starter during the 2018–19 season, scoring two goals in 31 league appearances and one goal – his first in European tournaments – in the third qualifying round of the Europa League against Ukrainian side Mariupol.

At the start of the 2019–20 season, new head coach Arne Slot preferred the newly emerged youngster Owen Wijndal at left back, which meant that Ouwejan mostly appeared as a midfielder, and found himself increasingly out of the starting lineup. He finished the season with 10 appearances in the Eredivisie and six in the Europa League.

==== Loan to Udinese ====
Ouwejan joined Italian club Udinese on a season-loan from AZ for the 2020–21 season, with an option to buy.He made his Serie A debut on 27 September 2020, in a 1–0 loss to Verona.

=== Schalke 04 ===
On 1 June 2021, Ouwejan agreed to join Schalke 04 on loan for the 2021–22 season with an option to make the move permanent. On 12 May 2022, Schalke exercised this option.

=== NEC ===
On 14 August 2024, Ouwejan signed a three-year contract with Eredivisie club NEC.

=== Machida Zelvia ===
Ouwejan signed for Japanese side Machida Zelvia on 1 September 2026, moving outside of Europe for the first time in his career.

== International career ==
Ouwejan gained five caps for the Netherlands under-17 team and took part with the under-19 team in the 2015 UEFA European Under-19 Championship. He was used in all three of the Netherlands' games in the tournament, which was eliminated after the group stage. He then gained eight caps for at under-20 level, and made his debut for the Netherlands U21 team in a friendly against Portugal on 15 November 2016 in Doetinchem.

== Career statistics ==
As of 9 November 2025

Appearances and goals by club, season and competition
Club	Season	League			Cup		Europe		Other (Note: Includes Eredivisie playoffs)		Total	
Club	Season	Division	Apps	Goals	Apps	Goals	Apps	Goals	Apps	Goals	Apps	Goals
AZ	2015–16	Eredivisie	3	0	1	0	1	0	—		5	0
AZ	2016–17|	Eredivisie	6	0	3	0	1	0	2	0	12	0
AZ	2017–18	Eredivisie	31	0	6	0	—		—		37	0
AZ	2018–19	Eredivisie	31	2	4	0	2	0	—		37	2
AZ	2019–20	Eredivisie	10	0	3	0	6	1	—		19	1
AZ	Total		81	2	17	0	10	1	2	0	110	3
Udinese (loan)	2020–21	Serie A	15	0	0	0	—		—		15	0
Schalke 04 (loan)	2021–22	2. Bundesliga	28	3	2	0	—		—		30	3
Schalke 04	2022–23	Bundesliga	17	0	2	0	—		—		19	0
Schalke 04	2023–24	2. Bundesliga	28	2	0	0	—		—		28	2
Schalke 04	Total		73	5	4	0	—		—		77	5
NEC	2024–25	Eredivisie	29	2	1	0	—		1 (Note: Appearances in European play-offs)	0	31	2
NEC	2025–26	Eredivisie	6	1	3	0	—		—		9	1
NEC	Total		35	3	4	0	—		1	0	40	3
Career total			204	10	25	0	10	1	3	0	242	11

== Honours ==
Schalke 04

- 2. Bundesliga: 2021–22
