= Oussama Idrissi =

Moroccan footballer (born 1996)

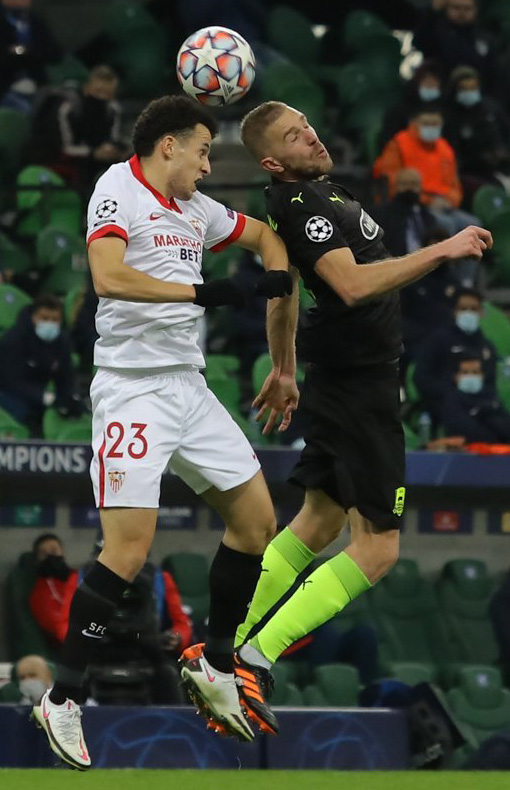
- Idrissi (left) playing for Sevilla in 2020

Personal information
- Full name: Oussama Idrissi
- Date of birth: 26 February 1996 (age 30)
- Place of birth: Bergen op Zoom, Netherlands
- Height: 1.79 m (5 ft 10 in)
- Position: Winger

Team information
- Current team: Pachuca
- Number: 11

Youth career
- 2002–2003: DOSKO
- 2003–2006: FC Bergen
- 2006–2009: Halsteren
- 2009–2011: NAC Breda
- 2011–2015: Feyenoord
- 2015–2016: Groningen

Senior career*
Years	Team	Apps	(Gls)
2015–2018	Groningen	58	(12)
2018–2020	AZ	69	(24)
2020–2023	Sevilla	8	(0)
2021	→ Ajax (loan)	7	(0)
2022	→ Cádiz (loan)	12	(1)
2022–2023	→ Feyenoord (loan)	27	(4)
2023–	Pachuca	109	(17)

International career^{‡}
2011–2012	Netherlands U16	6	(1)
2012–2013	Netherlands U17	8	(2)
2016	Netherlands U20	4	(1)
2016–2018	Netherlands U21	11	(3)
2019–2023	Morocco	9	(0)
- * Club domestic league appearances and goals as of 26 October 2026 ‡ National team caps and goals as of 23:25, 17 June 2023 (UTC)

Oussama Idrissi (Arabic: أسامة ادريسي; born 26 February 1996) is a professional footballer who plays as a winger for Liga MX club Pachuca. Born in the Netherlands, he represented Morocco at international level.

== Club career ==
=== Groningen ===
Idrissi made his professional debut for FC Groningen on 19 December 2015 in the Eredivisie match against Heracles Almelo. He came on in the 70th minute for Jarchinio Antonia. He scored his first league goal for the club on 7 February 2016 in a 2–0 home win over Cambuur. His goal, assisted by Simon Tibbling, came in the 75th minute. In October 2017, after playing regularly for two years in Groningen, the club suspended him and Mimoun Mahi citing disciplinary problems.

=== AZ ===
On 17 January 2018, Idrissi signed a contract with AZ, in a deal keeping him in Alkmaar through the 2021–22 season. He made his league debut for his new club on 19 January 2018 in a 1–1 away draw with Utrecht. He was subbed on for Jeremy Helmer in the 77th minute. He scored his first league goal for AZ on 24 February 2018 in a 2–1 home victory over Sparta Rotterdam. Idrissi also provided an assist to Wout Weghorst for AZ's first goal of the day. Idrissi's goal, assisted by Stijn Wuytens, came in the 86th minute and won the match for AZ.

On 25 October 2019, he scored his first goal in the Europa League during a 6–0 rout against Astana. He continued his strong form throughout the 2019–20 season, and won the Eredivisie player of the month award in both December and January, becoming the first player to win the award twice in a row.

=== Sevilla ===
On 5 October 2020, Idrissi signed for Sevilla until 2025. He made his debut for the Andalusians on 21 November 2020 in a 4–2 La Liga win over Celta, replacing Joan Jordán in the 81st minute. On 15 December 2020, Idrissi made his first start for the club in a 3–0 away victory against Ciudad de Lucena in the Copa del Rey, providing an assist for Luuk de Jong.

==== Loan to Ajax ====
On 31 January 2021, the final day of the winter transfer window, it was reported that Idrissi had joined Ajax on a six-month loan spell.

==== Loan to Cádiz ====
On 20 January 2022, Idrissi joined Cádiz on loan until the end of the season.

==== Loan to Feyenoord ====
On 27 July 2022, Idrissi joined Feyenoord on loan until the end of the 2022–23 season. He made his debut for the club on 7 August 2022, the first matchday of the 2022–23 Eredivisie campaign, replacing Patrik Wålemark in the 65th minute of a 5–2 away win over Vitesse. On 18 September 2022, Idrissi scored his first goal for Feyenoord, opening the score in the third minute of an eventual 4–3 league loss to PSV.

=== Pachuca ===
On 18 September 2023, Idrissi joined Liga MX club Pachuca on a one-year contract.

== International career ==
Idrissi has represented the Netherlands at various youth levels. He was called up by the Moroccan senior team in November 2018, and he declared his international allegiance to Morocco in February 2019. In March 2019, he was cleared by FIFA to represent Morocco. He made his debut for the Morocco national football team on 22 March 2019 in an Africa Cup of Nations qualifier against Malawi, as a starter.

== Career statistics ==
=== Club ===
As of match played on 14 December 2024

Appearances and goals by club, season and competition
Club	Season	League			National cup (Note: Includes KNVB Cup, Copa del Rey)		Continental		Other		Total	
Club	Season	Division	Apps	Goals	Apps	Goals	Apps	Goals	Apps	Goals	Apps	Goals
Groningen II	2015–16	Beloften Eredivisie	13	9	—		—		—		13	9
Groningen	2015–16	Eredivisie	16	3	0	0	0	0	2 (Note: Appearances in Eredivisie European competition play-offs)	0	18	3
Groningen	2016–17	Eredivisie	27	5	1	0	—		2	0	30	5
Groningen	2017–18	Eredivisie	15	4	1	1	—		0	0	16	5
Groningen	Total		58	12	2	1	0	0	4	0	64	13
AZ	2017–18	Eredivisie	12	3	3	3	—		–		15	6
AZ	2018–19	Eredivisie	32	8	5	6	2 (Note: Appearances in UEFA Europa League)	0	—		39	14
AZ	2019–20	Eredivisie	25	13	3	1	14	3	—		42	17
AZ	2020–21	Eredivisie	0	0	0	0	2 (Note: Appearances in UEFA Champions League)	0	—		2	0
AZ	Total		69	24	11	10	18	3	0	0	98	37
Sevilla	2020–21	La Liga	3	0	4	0	3	0	0	0	10	0
Sevilla	2021–22	La Liga	5	0	2	0	0	0	—		7	0
Sevilla	Total		8	0	6	0	3	0	0	0	17	0
Ajax (loan)	2020–21	Eredivisie	7	0	1	0	6	0	—		14	0
Cádiz (loan)	2021–22	La Liga	12	1	1	0	—		—		13	1
Feyenoord (loan)	2022–23	Eredivisie	27	4	4	0	7	3	—		38	7
Pachuca	2023–24	Liga MX	26	6	—		7 (Note: Appearances in CONCACAF Champions Cup)	1	—		33	7
Pachuca	2024–25	Liga MX	16	2	—		—		5 (Note: Three appearances and one goal in Leagues Cup, two appearances and one goal in FIFA Intercontinental Cup)	2	20	4
Pachuca	Total		42	8	—		7	1	5	2	54	11
Career total			236	58	25	11	41	7	9	2	311	78

=== International ===
As of match played on 17 June 2023

Appearances and goals by national team and year
National team	Year	Apps	Goals
Morocco	2019	7	0
Morocco	2023	2	0
Total		9	0

== Honours ==
Ajax

- Eredivisie: 2020–21
- KNVB Cup: 2020–21

Feyenoord

- Eredivisie: 2022–23

Sevilla

- UEFA–CONMEBOL Club Challenge: 2023

Pachuca

- CONCACAF Champions Cup: 2024
- FIFA Intercontinental Cup runner-up: 2024

Individual

- KNVB Cup Top scorer: 2018–19
- Eredivisie Team of the Season: 2019–20
- AZ Alkmaar Goal of the Season: 2019–20
- Eredivisie Player of the Month: December 2019, January 2020
- CONCACAF Champions Cup Best XI: 2024
- Liga MX All-Star: 2024
