= Max Huiberts =

Dutch footballer

Personal information
- Full name: Max Edwin Huiberts
- Date of birth: 17 November 1970 (age 55)
- Place of birth: Zwolle, Netherlands
- Height: 1.81 m (5 ft 11 in)
- Position: Left winger

Youth career
- CSV '28

Senior career*
Years	Team	Apps	(Gls)
1990–1991	FC Zwolle	20	(3)
1991–1995	Roda JC	113	(28)
1995–1996	Borussia Mönchengladbach	18	(0)
1996–2003	AZ	119	(41)
Total		270	(72)

International career
1991–1992	Netherlands U21	3	(2)
1992	Netherlands Olympic	1	(0)
- * Club domestic league appearances and goals

Max Huiberts (born 17 November 1970) is a Dutch retired footballer who played as a striker.

== Playing career ==
=== Club ===
Huiberts came through the youth ranks of hometown club CSV '28 and joined professional side FC Zwolle relatively late aged 20. He was snapped up by Roda JC after one season and later played for Borussia Mönchengladbach and AZ. His career was cut short due to a persisting knee injury.

=== International ===
Huiberts played 3 games for the Netherlands national under-21 football team.

== Post-playing career ==
After retiring as a player, Huiberts became a scout and technical coordinator for AZ and later director of football. He left the club in 2026, after reportedly earning the Alkmaar club half a billon euro's with his transferpolicy.
