= Marco Bizot =

Dutch footballer (born 1991)

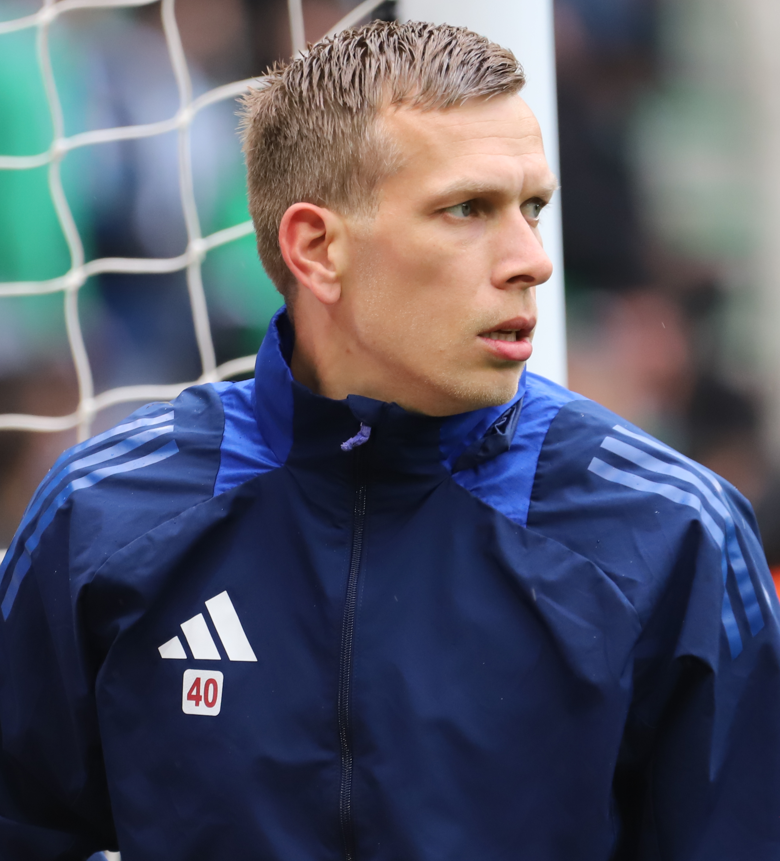
- Bizot in 2025 with Brest

Personal information
- Full name: Marco Remon Bizot
- Date of birth: 10 March 1991 (age 35)
- Place of birth: Hoorn, Netherlands
- Height: 1.93 m (6 ft 4 in)
- Position: Goalkeeper

Team information
- Current team: Aston Villa
- Number: 40

Youth career
- –2000: SV Westfriezen
- 2000–2011: Ajax

Senior career*
Years	Team	Apps	(Gls)
2011–2012	Ajax	0	(0)
2011–2012	→ Cambuur (loan)	17	(0)
2012–2014	Groningen	50	(0)
2014–2017	Genk	54	(0)
2017–2021	AZ	125	(0)
2021–2025	Brest	139	(0)
2025–	Aston Villa	8	(0)

International career^{‡}
2011–2013	Netherlands U21	7	(0)
2020	Netherlands	1	(0)
Medal record
Men's football
Representing Netherlands
UEFA Nations League
Silver medal – second place	2019 Portugal
- * Club domestic league appearances and goals as of 23 August 2026 ‡ National team caps and goals as of 11 November 2020

Marco Remon Bizot (Dutch pronunciation: [ˈmɑrkoː ˈbizɔt]; born 10 March 1991) is a Dutch professional footballer who plays as a goalkeeper for Premier League club Aston Villa.

== Club career ==
=== Ajax ===
Born in Hoorn, Netherlands, Marco Bizot started his career in his early youth for SV Westfriezen in Zwaag, Netherlands. This is where he was discovered at age ten, and brought to Ajax's youth academy in 2000, from where he started in the E-youth levels. He joined the Jong Ajax selection for the 2010–11 season, where he received ample playing time under coaches Pieter Huistra and Fred Grim. After a successful season with Jong Ajax, Bizot received a contract extension, and was loaned to Cambuur in the Eerste Divisie for the 2011–12 season, in order to gain experience and to prove himself as a player.

=== Groningen ===
On 14 June 2012, Ajax and Groningen came to the agreement of a direct transfer of Bizot. Bizot developed into a solid Eredivisie goalkeeper and played 50 matches in two seasons for the team.

=== Genk ===
On 22 June 2014, it was announced that Groningen had sold Bizot to Belgian side Genk. He signed a contract for three years.

=== AZ ===
On 10 May 2017, Bizot signed a contract at AZ. He was picked as the replacement of Tim Krul, who returned to Newcastle United after a loan spell. Bizot played all 40 official games in the following season and played in the Dutch cup final. After the summer, he remained consistent with the most clean sheets ever in the Eredivisie. In February 2020 he extended his contract to mid-2022.

=== Brest ===
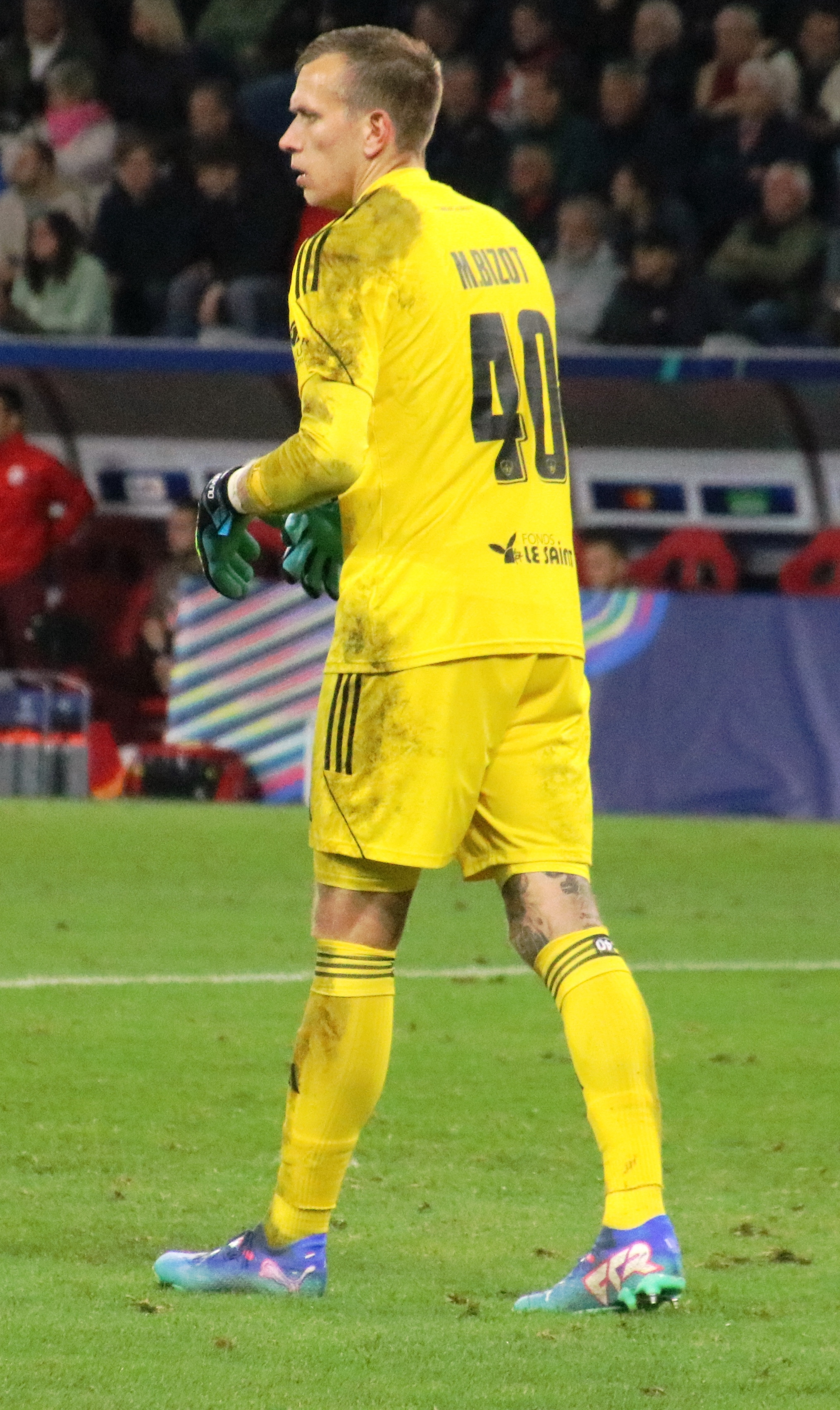
Bizot in 2024 with Brest

On 4 August 2021, Brest announced that Bizot had penned a three-year contract with the club, for a reported fee of €1 million. He made his competitive debut for the club on the first matchday of the 2021–22 Ligue 1 season; a 1–1 draw against Lyon. Bizot kept his first clean sheet for Brest on 31 October, which was also the club's first win of the season, a 2–0 home victory against Monaco. In the 2023–24 season, he contributed to his club's impressive campaign, with 13 clean sheets, as they secured a third-place finish in the league and first ever qualification to the UEFA Champions League.

=== Aston Villa ===
On 15 July 2025, Bizot signed for English club Aston Villa for an undisclosed fee. On 16 August, he made his Premier League debut for the club in a 0–0 draw with Newcastle United. On 14 February 2026, Bizot received a straight red card in an FA Cup tie against Newcastle United after bringing down a player outside the box. Villa, who were 1–0 up at the time of the red card, went on to lose the match 3–1.

== International career ==
Bizot earned his first full international call up in Ronald Koeman's first Netherlands squad in March 2018. He made his debut in a friendly against Spain on 11 November 2020.

Bizot received a call up on 1 March 2024 for a brace of friendlies against Scotland and Germany.

== Career statistics ==
=== Club ===
As of match played 28 October 2026

Appearances and goals by club, season and competition
Club	Season	League			National cup (Note: Includes KNVB Cup, Belgian Cup, FA Cup)		League cup (Note: Includes EFL Cup)		Europe		Other		Total	
Club	Season	Division	Apps	Goals	Apps	Goals	Apps	Goals	Apps	Goals	Apps	Goals	Apps	Goals
Cambuur (loan)	2011–12	Eerste Divisie	17	0	0	0	—		—		4 (Note: Appearances in Eerste Divisie promotion playoffs)	0	21	0
Groningen	2012–13	Eredivisie	16	0	0	0	—		—		2 (Note: Appearances in Eredivisie European play-offs)	0	18	0
Groningen	2013–14	Eredivisie	34	0	3	0	—		—		4	0	41	0
Groningen	Total		50	0	3	0	—		—		6	0	59	0
Genk	2014–15	Belgian Pro League	5	0	0	0	—		—		0	0	5	0
Genk	2015–16	Belgian Pro League	25	0	5	0	—		—		2 (Note: Appearances in Belgian Pro League European play-offs)	0	32	0
Genk	2016–17	Belgian Pro League	22	0	4	0	—		11 (Note: Appearances in UEFA Europa League)	0	—		37	0
Genk	Total		52	0	9	0	—		11	0	2	0	74	0
AZ	2017–18	Eredivisie	34	0	6	0	—		—		—		40	0
AZ	2018–19	Eredivisie	34	0	5	0	—		2	0	—		41	0
AZ	2019–20	Eredivisie	24	0	3	0	—		14	0	—		41	0
AZ	2020–21	Eredivisie	33	0	1	0	—		8 (Note: Two appearances in UEFA Champions League, six appearances in UEFA Europa League)	0	—		42	0
AZ	Total		125	0	15	0	—		24	0	—		164	0
Brest	2021–22	Ligue 1	38	0	0	0	—		—		—		38	0
Brest	2022–23	Ligue 1	37	0	0	0	—		—		—		37	0
Brest	2023–24	Ligue 1	32	0	0	0	—		—		—		32	0
Brest	2024–25	Ligue 1	32	0	0	0	—		9 (Note: Appearances in UEFA Champions League)	0	—		41	0
Brest	Total		139	0	0	0	—		9	0	—		148	0
Aston Villa	2025–26	Premier League	7	0	2	0	1	0	4	0	—		14	0
Aston Villa	2026–27	Premier League	1	0	0	0	2	0	0	0	1 (Note: Appearance in UEFA Super Cup)	0	4	0
Aston Villa	Total		8	0	2	0	3	0	4	0	1	0	18	0
Career total			391	0	29	0	3	0	48	0	13	0	484	0

=== International ===
As of match played 11 November 2020

Appearances and goals by national team and year
National team	Year	Apps	Goals
Netherlands	2020	1	0
Total		1	0

== Honours ==
Aston Villa

- UEFA Europa League: 2025–26
