= 2020–21 PEC Zwolle season =

PEC Zwolle
2020–21 season
- Chairman: Adriaan Visser
- Manager: John Stegeman
- Stadium: MAC³PARK Stadion
- Eredivisie: 13th
- KNVB Cup: Second round
- Top goalscorer: League: Reza Ghoochannejhad (7); All: Reza Ghoochannejhad (7)
Home colours

The 2020–21 PEC Zwolle season was the club's 111th season in existence and the 13th consecutive season in the top flight of Dutch football. In addition to the domestic league, PEC Zwolle participated in this season's edition of the KNVB Cup. The season covered the period from 1 July 2020 to 30 June 2021.

== Players ==
=== First-team squad ===
Note: Flags indicate national team as defined under FIFA eligibility rules; some limited exceptions apply. Players may hold more than one non-FIFA nationality.

No.	Pos.	Nation	Player
1	GK	NED	Xavier Mous
2	DF	NED	Bram van Polen (captain)
3	DF	FIN	Thomas Lam
4	DF	JPN	Yuta Nakayama
5	DF	NED	Kenneth Paal
6	MF	NED	Mustafa Saymak
7	FW	NED	Virgil Misidjan
8	FW	IRI	Reza Ghoochannejhad
9	FW	NED	Mike van Duinen
11	MF	NED	Jesper Drost
13	MF	GER	Rico Strieder
14	FW	BEL	Manuel Benson (on loan from Antwerp)
15	DF	NED	Sam Kersten

No.	Pos.	Nation	Player
16	GK	NED	Nigel Bertrams (on loan from FC Groningen)
17	DF	KOS	Destan Bajselmani
20	MF	NED	Thomas van den Belt
21	MF	NED	Samir Lagsir
22	MF	NED	Pelle Clement
23	FW	NED	Eliano Reijnders
25	MF	NED	Immanuel Pherai (on loan from Borussia Dortmund)
27	FW	SRB	Slobodan Tedić (on loan from Manchester City)
29	FW	NED	Thomas Buitink (on loan from Vitesse)
30	MF	NED	Dean Huiberts
31	DF	JPN	Sai van Wermeskerken
32	FW	NED	Jarno Westerman
40	GK	NED	Mike Hauptmeijer

=== Out on loan ===
Note: Flags indicate national team as defined under FIFA eligibility rules; some limited exceptions apply. Players may hold more than one non-FIFA nationality.

No.	Pos.	Nation	Player
10	MF	NED	Clint Leemans (at De Graafschap until 30 June 2021)

== Transfers ==
=== In ===
Date	No.	Pos	Player	Transferred from	Fee	Source
1 July 2020		DF	(Netherlands) Destan Bajselmani	Academy		
1 July 2020		FW	(Netherlands) Zian Flemming	(Netherlands) NEC Nijmegen	Loan return	
1 July 2020		MF	(Netherlands) Clint Leemans	(Netherlands) RKC Waalwijk	Loan return	
1 July 2020		FW	(Netherlands) Stanley Elbers	(Netherlands) RKC Waalwijk	Loan return	
2 July 2020		MF	(Germany) Rico Strieder	(Netherlands) FC Utrecht	Undisclosed	
3 July 2020		MF	(Netherlands) Jesper Drost	(Netherlands) FC Groningen	Free transfer	

=== Out ===
Date	No.	Pos	Player	Transferred to	Type	Fee	Source
1 July 2020	19	MF	(Netherlands) Rick Dekker	(Netherlands) De Graafschap	End of contract		
1 July 2020	32	MF	(Netherlands) Jarni Koorman	TBD	End of contract		
1 July 2020	25	FW	(Netherlands) Stanley Elbers	TBD	End of contract		
1 July 2020	23	DF	(Netherlands) Etiënne Reijnen	End of career			
1 July 2020	17	FW	(Norway) Dennis Johnsen	(Netherlands) AFC Ajax	End of loan		
1 July 2020	13	MF	(Germany) Rico Strieder	(Netherlands) FC Utrecht	End of loan		
3 July 2020	38	MF	(Netherlands) Gustavo Hamer	(England) Coventry City F.C.	Transfer	€1,500,000 (Note: Fee may eventually rise due to undisclosed bonuses.)	

== Pre-season and friendlies ==
Win Draw Loss

1 August 2020 Friendly	SC Cambuur (Netherlands)	2–0	(Netherlands) PEC Zwolle	Leeuwarden, Netherlands
17:00 CEST (UTC+2)	Mühren 22'; Korte 57'	Report		Stadium: Cambuur Stadion; Attendance: 1,400; Referee: Siemen Mulder

5 August 2020 Friendly	AZ (Netherlands)	0–1	(Netherlands) PEC Zwolle	Wissel, Netherlands
19:00 CEST (UTC+2)		Report	Flemming 68'	Stadium: Sportpark Ericaweg; Attendance: 0

9 August 2020 Friendly	Heracles Almelo (Netherlands)	0–1	(Netherlands) PEC Zwolle	Almelo, Netherlands
16:45 CEST (UTC+2)		Report	Kersten 38'	Stadium: Erve Asito; Attendance: 1,200; Referee: Bas Nijhuis

14 August 2020 Friendly	FC Groningen (Netherlands)	0–2	(Netherlands) PEC Zwolle	Groningen, Netherlands
14:00 CEST (UTC+2)		Report	Ghoochannejhad 48', 92'	Stadium: Euroborg; Attendance: 1,400; Referee: Jeroen Manschot
Note: Match was played in two 60-minute halves.

21 August 2020 Friendly	Team VVCS (Netherlands)	1–0	(Netherlands) PEC Zwolle	Wissel, Netherlands
14:00 CEST (UTC+2)	Brusselers 25'	Report		Stadium: Sportpark Ericaweg
Note: Match was played in two 35-minute halves.

24 August 2020 Friendly	FC Emmen (Netherlands)	0–1	(Netherlands) PEC Zwolle	Emmen, Netherlands
18:45 CEST (UTC+2)		Report	Ghoochannejhad 76'	Stadium: De Oude Meerdijk; Attendance: 1,000; Referee: Rob Dieperink

29 August 2020 Friendly	PEC Zwolle (Netherlands)	0–2	(Netherlands) FC Utrecht	Zwolle, Netherlands
14:00 CEST (UTC+2)	Kersten (yellow card); Huiberts (yellow card)		Ramselaar 17'; Bergström 73'	Stadium: MAC³PARK Stadion; Attendance: 0

5 September 2020 Friendly	SC Heerenveen (Netherlands)	0–1	(Netherlands) PEC Zwolle	Heerenveen, Netherlands
14:30 CEST (UTC+2)		Report	Akujobi 14' (o.g.)	Stadium: Abe Lenstra Stadion; Attendance: 1,500; Referee: Björn Kuipers

8 October 2020 Friendly	PEC Zwolle (Netherlands)	3–3	(Netherlands) FC Utrecht	Zwolle, Netherlands
13:00 CEST (UTC+2)	Van Wermeskerken 29'; Doue 54'; Van Duinen 76' (pen.)	Report	Velanas 2'; Van de Streek 12', 40'	Stadium: MAC³PARK Stadion; Attendance: 0 Referee: Maurice Paarhuis

== Competitions ==
=== Overview ===
Competition	First match	Last match	Starting round	Final position	Record							
Competition	First match	Last match	Starting round	Final position	Pld	W	D	L	GF	GA	GD	Win %
Eredivisie	12 September 2020	16 May 2021	Matchday 1	13th	34	9	11	14	44	53	−9	26.47
KNVB Cup	1 December 2020	15 December 2020	First round	Second round	1	0	0	1	0	2	−2	0.00
Total					35	9	11	15	44	55	−11	25.71

Source: Soccerway

=== Eredivisie ===
==== League table ====
Pos	Team	Pld	W	D	L	GF	GA	GD	Pts
11	Fortuna Sittard	34	12	5	17	50	58	−8	41
12	Heerenveen	34	9	12	13	43	49	−6	39
13	PEC Zwolle	34	9	11	14	44	53	−9	38
14	Willem II	34	8	7	19	40	68	−28	31
15	RKC Waalwijk	34	7	9	18	33	55	−22	30

Source: Eredivisie, Soccerway
Rules for classification: Season in progress: 1) Most points won; 2) Less points lost; 3) Goal difference; 4) Goals scored; 5) Alphabetical order; End of season: 1) Points; 2) Goal difference; 3) Goals scored; 4) Head-to-head points; 5) Head-to-head goal difference; 6) Head-to-head away goals scored; 7) Play-off if relevant for deciding champion, relegation or participating in a European league, otherwise by draw. 8) Penalty shoot-out (only after a play-off)

==== Results summary ====
Overall								Home						Away					
Pld	W	D	L	GF	GA	GD	Pts	W	D	L	GF	GA	GD	W	D	L	GF	GA	GD
34	9	11	14	44	53	−9	38	6	6	5	19	18	+1	3	5	9	25	35	−10

Source: Eredivisie

==== Results by round ====
Round	1	2	3	4	5	6	7	8	9	10	11	12	13	14	15	16	17	18	19	20	21	22	23	24	25	26	27	28	29	30	31	32	33	34
Ground	H	A	H	A	H	H	A	A	H	A	H	A	H	A	H	A	H	A	H	A	H	A	A	H	A	H	H	A	H	A	A	H	A	H
Result	L	D	W	D	L	D	L	D	D	D	W	L	D	W	D	L	L	W	D	D	D	L	L	W	L	L	W	L	W	W	L	L	L	W
Position	17	13	7	11	10	9	11	12	12	11	11	11	11	11	11	12	13	12	13	13	13	13	13	12	12	13	13	13	13	13	13	13	13	13

Source: Eredivisie
A = Away; H = Home; W = Win; D = Draw; L = Loss

==== Matches ====
The league fixtures were announced on 24 July 2020.

12 September 2020 1	PEC Zwolle	0–2	Feyenoord	Zwolle
20:00 CEST (UTC+2)	Huiberts (yellow card) 16'; Kersten (yellow card) 50'; Van Polen (yellow card) 78'	Report	Berghuis 5', 68' (pen.); Toornstra (yellow card) 90'	Stadium: MAC³PARK Stadion; Attendance: 2,993; Referee: Bas Nijhuis

19 September 2020 2	AZ	1–1	PEC Zwolle	Alkmaar
16:30 CEST (UTC+2)	Stengs (red card) 17'; Boadu 68'; Guðmundsson (yellow card) 72'; Svensson (yellow card) 90+2'	Report	Van Duinen (yellow card) 9'; Leemans 38'; Huiberts (yellow card) 40'; Van Polen (yellow card) 71'; Lam (yellow card) 74', (red card) 83'; Nakayama (yellow card) 90+5'	Stadium: AFAS Stadion; Attendance: 5,000; Referee: Serdar Gözübüyük

26 September 2020 3	PEC Zwolle	4–0	Sparta Rotterdam	Zwolle
16:30 CEST (UTC+2)	Nakayama (yellow card) 33', (goal) 71'; Ghoochannejhad 45+5' (pen.), 47'; Leemans 54'	Report	Auassar (yellow card) 45+2'; Pinto (red card) 45+4'	Stadium: MAC³PARK Stadion; Attendance: 2,933; Referee: Allard Lindhout

18 October 2020 5	PEC Zwolle	0–3	PSV	Zwolle
16:45 CEST (UTC+2)	Huiberts (yellow card) 43'; Van Polen (yellow card) 57'	Report	Götze 9'; Gakpo 18'; Malen 39'; Rosario (yellow card) 61'; Sangaré (yellow card) 86'	Stadium: MAC³PARK Stadion; Attendance: 0 Referee: Danny Makkelie

21 October 2020 4	RKC Waalwijk	1–1	PEC Zwolle	Waalwijk
17:30 CEST (UTC+2)	Stokkers 86'	Report	Reijnders 65'	Stadium: Mandemakers Stadion; Referee: Rob Dieperink

24 October 2020 6	PEC Zwolle	0–0	Willem II	Zwolle
20:00 CEST (UTC+2)	Leemans (yellow card) 47'; Saymak (yellow card) 84' (yellow-red card) 85'	Report	Trésor (yellow card) 48'	Stadium: MAC³PARK Stadion; Attendance: 0 Referee: Martín Pérez

31 October 2020 7	FC Twente	5–1	PEC Zwolle	Enschede
18:45 CET (UTC+1)	Menig 5'; Danilo 29'; Brama 33'; Černý 51'; Ilić 84'	Report	Reijnders 74'	Stadium: De Grolsch Veste; Attendance: 0 Referee: Serdar Gözübüyük

6 November 2020 8	Fortuna Sittard	2–2	PEC Zwolle	Sittard
20:00 CET (UTC+1)	Hansson 6'; Cox 46'	Report	Jach 33'; Lam 54'	Stadium: Fortuna Sittard Stadion; Attendance: 0 Referee: Edwin van de Graaf

21 November 2020 9	PEC Zwolle	1–1	FC Utrecht	Zwolle
21:00 CET (UTC+1)	Paal (yellow card) 22'; Warmerdam 32' (o.g.); Huiberts (yellow card) 54'; Lam (yellow card) 84'	Report	St. Jago (yellow card) 17'; Mahi 59'; Gustafson (yellow card) 85'; Elia (yellow card) 87'	Stadium: MAC³PARK Stadion; Attendance: 0 Referee: Danny Makkelie

28 November 2020 10	VVV-Venlo	2–2	PEC Zwolle	Venlo
21:00 CET (UTC+1)	Arias 21'; Giakoumakis 78'	Report	Nakayama (yellow card) 9'; Pherai 36'; Van Duinen 69'; Lam (red card) 90+3'	Stadium: De Koel; Attendance: 0 Referee: Rob Dieperink

5 December 2020 11	PEC Zwolle	2–1	Vitesse	Zwolle
21:00 CET (UTC+1)	Drost 65', (yellow card) 77'; Van Duinen 76' (pen.); Reijnders (yellow card) 90'	Report	Darfalou 7'; Touré (red card) 65'; Bero (yellow card) 74'; Bazoer (yellow card) 90+3'	Stadium: MAC³PARK Stadion; Attendance: 0 Referee: Dennis Higler

12 December 2020 12	Ajax	4–0	PEC Zwolle	Amsterdam
20:00 CET (UTC+1)	Huntelaar 7'; Promes 11'; Antony 35'; Gravenberch 90+2'	Report		Stadium: Johan Cruyff Arena; Attendance: 0 Referee: Pol van Boekel

18 December 2020 13	PEC Zwolle	0–0	FC Emmen	Zwolle
20:00 CET (UTC+1)		Report		Stadium: MAC³PARK Stadion; Attendance: 0 Referee: Björn Kuipers

23 December 2020 14	ADO Den Haag	0–2	PEC Zwolle	The Hague
20:00 CET (UTC+1)	Ould-Chikh (yellow card) 87'	Report	Van Duinen 51'; Kersten (yellow card) 75'; Leemans 84'	Stadium: Cars Jeans Stadion; Attendance: 0 Referee: Ingmar Oostrom

9 January 2021 15	PEC Zwolle	1–1	AZ	Zwolle
20:00 CET (UTC+1)	Clement 9'; Kersten (yellow card) 80'	Report	Midtsjø 67'	Stadium: MAC³PARK Stadion; Attendance: 0 Referee: Kevin Blom

13 January 2021 16	Feyenoord	1–0	PEC Zwolle	Rotterdam
21:00 CET (UTC+1)	Sinisterra 64'	Report		Stadium: De Kuip; Attendance: 0 Referee: Bas Nijhuis

16 January 2021 17	PEC Zwolle	0–2	Fortuna Sittard	Zwolle
20:00 CET (UTC+1)		Report	Flemming 57'; Seuntjens 89'	Stadium: MAC³PARK Stadion; Attendance: 0 Referee: Christiaan Bax

22 January 2021 18	Willem II	1–3	PEC Zwolle	Tilburg
20:00 CET (UTC+1)	Wriedt 10', (red card) 45+1'; Selahi (yellow card) 41'	Report	Kersten (yellow card) 45'; Ghoochannejhad 58', 62', 70' (pen.)	Stadium: Koning Willem II Stadion; Attendance: 0 Referee: Sander van der Eijk

26 January 2021 19	PEC Zwolle	2–2	Heracles Almelo	Zwolle
18:45 CET (UTC+1)	Misidjan (yellow card) 15', (goal) 50'; Ghoochannejhad 73'	Report	Schoofs 1'; Pröpper (yellow card) 16'; Quagliata (yellow card) 24'; Burgzorg 45+2'	Stadium: MAC³PARK Stadion; Attendance: 0 Referee: Marc Nagtegaal

30 January 2021 20	FC Utrecht	3–3	PEC Zwolle	Utrecht
18:45 CET (UTC+1)	Van de Streek 2'; Maher 54' (pen.); Balk (yellow card) 90+3'; Ter Avest 90+6'	Report	Misidjan 4'; Lam 39' (pen.); Buitink 67'; Benson (yellow card) 72'; Van Polen (red card) 90+2'	Stadium: Stadion Galgenwaard; Attendance: 0 Referee: Jannick van der Laan

6 February 2021 21	PEC Zwolle	1–1	RKC Waalwijk	Zwolle
14:00 CET (UTC+1)	Saymak 72'	Report	Touba 4'	Stadium: MAC³PARK Stadion; Attendance: 0 Referee: Björn Kuipers

13 February 2021 22	FC Groningen	1–0	PEC Zwolle	Groningen
20:00 CET (UTC+1)	Larsen 16'; Te Wierik (yellow card) 48'	Report	Pherai (yellow card) 51'; Clement (red card) 59'	Stadium: Euroborg; Attendance: 0 Referee: Jeroen Manschot

20 February 2021 23	FC Emmen	3–2	PEC Zwolle	Emmen
18:45 CET (UTC+1)	Bijl (yellow card) 26'; Adžić 36'; De Leeuw 45'; Vlak 70'; Cavlan (yellow card) 87'	Report	Lam (yellow card) 23'; Van Polen 40'; Nakayama 88'	Stadium: De Oude Meerdijk; Attendance: 0 Referee: Serdar Gözübüyük

26 February 2021 24	PEC Zwolle	4–1	SC Heerenveen	Zwolle
20:00 CET (UTC+1)	Misidjan 52'; Buitink 70'; Huiberts (yellow card) 77'; Van Polen 89'; Reijnders 90+2'	Report	Van Bergen 27'; J. Veerman (yellow card) 83'; De Jong (yellow card) 83'	Stadium: MAC³PARK Stadion; Attendance: 0 Referee: Laurens Gerrets

7 March 2021 25	Heracles Almelo	2–1	PEC Zwolle	Almelo
14:30 CET (UTC+1)	Vloet 61'; De la Torre 90+2'	Report	Saymak 63'	Stadium: Erve Asito; Attendance: 0 Referee: Bas Nijhuis

14 March 2021 26	PEC Zwolle	0–2	Ajax	Zwolle
16:45 CET (UTC+1)	Huiberts (yellow card) 62'	Report	Neres 28'; Tagliafico 38'; Haller (yellow card) 90+1'	Stadium: MAC³PARK Stadion; Attendance: 0 Referee: Pol van Boekel

21 March 2021 27	PEC Zwolle	2–1	VVV-Venlo	Zwolle
12:15 CET (UTC+1)	Lam (yellow card) 51', (goal) 79' (pen.); Tedić 66'	Report	Gelmi 69'; Giakoumakis (yellow card) 90+3'	Stadium: MAC³PARK Stadion; Attendance: 0 Referee: Ingmar Oostrom

3 April 2021 28	Sparta Rotterdam	3–2	PEC Zwolle	Rotterdam
21:00 CEST (UTC+2)	Pinto 7'; Beugelsdijk (yellow card) 26'; Thy 75' (pen.), 90+3'	Report	Van Polen 52'; Reijnders (yellow card) 57'; Tedić 63'	Stadium: Het Kasteel; Attendance: 0 Referee: Edwin van de Graaf

10 April 2021 29	PEC Zwolle	1–0	FC Twente	Zwolle
21:00 CEST (UTC+2)	Misidjan 35'	Report		Stadium: MAC³PARK Stadion; Attendance: 0 Referee: Richard Martens

24 April 2021 30	SC Heerenveen	0–2	PEC Zwolle	Heerenveen
16:30 CEST (UTC+2)	De Jong (yellow card) 79'	Report	Van Polen (yellow card) 18', (goal) 68'; Clement 28'; Paal (yellow card) 56'	Stadium: Abe Lenstra Stadion; Attendance: 2,000; Referee: Rob Dieperink

1 May 2021 31	Vitesse	2–1	PEC Zwolle	Arnhem
20:00 CEST (UTC+2)	Broja 27'; Manhoef (yellow card) 42'; Bero (yellow card) 62'; Doekhi (yellow card) 69'; Touré 90+2'	Report	Drost 54'	Stadium: GelreDome; Attendance: 0 Referee: Joey Kooij

9 May 2021 32	PEC Zwolle	0–1	ADO Den Haag	Zwolle
14:30 CEST (UTC+2)	Bajselmani (yellow card) 19'; Paal (yellow card) 76'	Report	Adekanye 12'; El Khayati (yellow card) 84'; Ćatić (yellow card) 90+1'	Stadium: MAC³PARK Stadion; Attendance: 0 Referee: Jeroen Manschot

13 May 2021 33	PSV	4–2	PEC Zwolle	Eindhoven
14:30 CEST (UTC+2)	Mous 22' (o.g.); Malen 29'; Vertessen 34'; Zahavi 54'	Report	Bajselmani (yellow card) 42'; Doue (yellow card) 52'; Lam (yellow card) 66'; Pherai 69'; Lagsir 90'	Stadium: Philips Stadion; Attendance: 0 Referee: Serdar Gözübüyük

16 May 2021 34	PEC Zwolle	1–0	FC Groningen	Zwolle
14:30 CEST (UTC+2)	Itakura 80' (o.g.)	Report		Stadium: MAC³PARK Stadion; Attendance: 0 Referee: Richard Martens

=== KNVB Cup ===
1 December 2020 First round	VV Staphorst	Bye	PEC Zwolle	Staphorst
19:45 CET (UTC+1)				Stadium: Sportpark Het Noorderslag

15 December 2020 Second round	Excelsior	2–0	PEC Zwolle	Rotterdam
18:45 CET (UTC+1)	Oude Kotte 63'; Mendes Moreira 86'	Report		Stadium: Van Donge & De Roo Stadion; Attendance: 0 Referee: Laurens Gerrets
