= 2019–20 PEC Zwolle season =

PEC Zwolle
2019–20 season
- Chairman: Adriaan Visser
- Manager: John Stegeman
- Stadium: MAC³PARK Stadion
- Eredivisie: 15th
- KNVB Cup: Second round
- Top goalscorer: League: Reza Ghoochannejhad (7); All: Reza Ghoochannejhad; Lennart Thy (7 each)
- Highest home attendance: 14,000 (vs. Ajax, 6 December 2019)
- Lowest home attendance: 12,532 (vs. Sparta Rotterdam, 25 August 2019)
- Average home league attendance: 13,357 1920

The 2019–20 season was PEC Zwolle's 109th season of play, it marked its 18th season in the Eredivisie and its 8th consecutive season in the top flight of Dutch football. They ended the season fifteenth in the league. PEC Zwolle entered the KNVB Cup in the second round. The lost in the second round against Fortuna Sittard (0–2).

Due to the COVID-19 pandemic, on 21 April, Dutch Prime Minister Mark Rutte announced that events that require a permit are forbidden until 1 September. This meant that football matches were also not allowed, resulting in the end of the 2019–20 Eredivisie season. As a result, the KNVB decided on 24 April to maintain the current league positions, but not to appoint a champion. Since PEC Zwolle was in fifteenth place on 8 March (after the last completed round). It was awarded that place.

== Competitions ==
=== Friendlies ===
| 29 June 2019 Friendly | FC Dalfsen | 0 – 11 | PEC Zwolle | Wijthmen |
| | | Report | 10', 45' Lennart Thy; 12' Stanley Elbers; 28' Pelle Clement; 45+2' Clint Leemans; 52', 78' Mike van Duinen; 62' Stefan de Bert; 68', 90', 90+1' Jarno Westerman | Stadium: Sportpark De Elshof; Attendance: 740 |

| 2 July 2019 Friendly | VV Hattem | 0 – 8 | PEC Zwolle | Hattem |
| | | Report | 2' Clint Leemans; 17' Eliano Reijnders; 39' Mike van Duinen; 69', 75', 84', 88', 89' Zian Flemming | Stadium: Sportpark Het Achterveen; Attendance: 1,400 |

| 5 July 2019 Friendly | FC Emmen | 1 – 1 | PEC Zwolle | Coevorden |
| | Stanley Elbers 47' | Report | 52' Marko Kolar | Stadium: Sportpark De Pampert; Attendance: 2,000; Referee: Joey Kooij |

| 9 July 2019 Friendly | PEC Zwolle | 2 – 2 | (Greece) PAOK FC | Nieuwleusen |
| | Dennis Johnsen 36'; Lennart Thy 82' | Report | 1', 31' Karol Swiderski | Stadium: Sportpark Hulsterlanden; Attendance: 2,500; Referee: Edwin van de Graaf |

| 16 July 2019 Friendly | ZAC | 1 – 7 | PEC Zwolle | Zwolle |
| | Okke Scholten 84' (pen.) | Report | 26', 32', 45' Zian Flemming; 33', 72' Eliano Reijnders; 60' Jan Quispel; 74' Lennart Thy | Stadium: Sportpark Jo van Marle |

| 19 July 2019 Friendly | PEC Zwolle | 4 – 1 | SC Cambuur | Zwolle |
| | Iliass Bel Hassani 38', 39'; Stanley Elbers 68'; Dennis Johnsen 74' | Report | 18' Robert Mühren | Stadium: MAC³PARK Stadion; Referee: Martin van den Kerkhof |

| 27 July 2019 Friendly | PEC Zwolle | 1 – 0 | (Greece) Asteras Tripolis | Zwolle |
| | Gustavo Hamer 67' | Report | | Stadium: MAC³PARK Stadion; Referee: Richard Martens |

| 5 September 2019 Friendly | Arminia Bielefeld (Germany) | 2 – 0 | PEC Zwolle | Bielefeld |
| | Jonathan Clauss 38'; Fabian Klos 43'; Fabian Kunze (yellow card) | Report | | Stadium: Bielefelder Alm; Referee: Stegemann |

| 14 November 2019 Friendly | 1. FC Köln (Germany) | 0 – 0 | PEC Zwolle | Cologne |
| | Birger Verstraete (yellow card) | Report | (yellow card) Dean Huiberts; (yellow card) Sam Kersten | Stadium: Franz-Kremer-Stadion |

| 10 January 2020 Friendly | PEC Zwolle | 1 – 3 | (Belgium) S.V. Zulte Waregem | Mijas |
| | Reza Ghoochannejhad 61' | Report | 13', 17' Mathieu De Smet; 86' Nikolaos Kenourgios |

| 10 January 2020 Friendly | PEC Zwolle | 0 – 2 | (Belgium) Standard Liège | Coín |
| | | Report | 12', 17' Maxime Lestienne |

=== Eredivisie ===
==== League table ====
| Pos | Team | Pld | W | D | L | GF | GA | GD | Pts |
|---|---|---|---|---|---|---|---|---|---|
| 13 | VVV-Venlo | 26 | 8 | 4 | 14 | 24 | 51 | −27 | 28 |
| 14 | FC Twente | 26 | 7 | 6 | 13 | 34 | 46 | −12 | 27 |
| 15 | PEC Zwolle | 26 | 7 | 5 | 14 | 37 | 55 | −18 | 26 |
| 16 | Fortuna Sittard | 26 | 6 | 8 | 12 | 29 | 52 | −23 | 26 |
| 17 | ADO Den Haag | 26 | 4 | 7 | 15 | 25 | 54 | −29 | 19 |

Source: eredivisie.nl
Rules for classification: Season in progress: 1) Most points won; 2) Less points lost; 3) Goal difference; 4) Goals scored; 5) Alphabetical order; End of season: 1) Points; 2) Goal difference; 3) Goals scored; 4) Head-to-head points; 5) Head-to-head goal difference; 6) Head-to-head away goals scored; 7) Play-off if relevant for deciding champion, relegation or participating in a European league, otherwise by draw. 8) Penalty shoot-out (only after a play-off)

==== Results summary ====
| Overall | | | | | | | | Home | | | | | | Away | | | | | |
| Pld | W | D | L | GF | GA | GD | Pts | W | D | L | GF | GA | GD | W | D | L | GF | GA | GD |
|---|---|---|---|---|---|---|---|---|---|---|---|---|---|---|---|---|---|---|---|
| 24 | 6 | 4 | 14 | 28 | 53 | −25 | 22 | 4 | 2 | 5 | 24 | 29 | −5 | 2 | 2 | 9 | 4 | 24 | −20 |

Source: League matches

==== Results by round ====
| Round | 1 | 2 | 3 | 4 | 5 | 6 | 7 | 8 | 9 | 10 | 11 | 12 | 13 | 14 | 15 | 16 | 17 | 18 | 19 | 20 | 21 | 22 | 23 | 24 | 25 | 26 | 27 | 28 | 29 | 30 | 31 | 32 | 33 | 34 |
|---|---|---|---|---|---|---|---|---|---|---|---|---|---|---|---|---|---|---|---|---|---|---|---|---|---|---|---|---|---|---|---|---|---|---|
| Ground | H | A | A | H | A | H | A | H | A | H | A | H | A | H | A | H | A | A | H | A | H | A | H | A | H | A | H | H | A | H | A | H | H | A |
| Result | L | L | L | D | W | W | L | L | L | W | L | L | L | W | L | L | W | L | D | D | W | D | L | L | W | D | C | C | C | C | C | C | C | C |
| Position | 15 | 16 | 18 | 17 | 15 | 12 | 14 | 15 | 14 | 13 | 13 | 15 | 16 | 14 | 15 | 16 | 15 | 15 | 15 | 16 | 15 | 15 | 16 | 16 | 15 | 15 | 15 | 15 | 15 | 15 | 15 | 15 | 15 | 15 |

Updated to match(es) played on 2 June 2020. Source: KNVB
A = Away; H = Home; W = Win; D = Draw; L = Loss; C = Cancelled

==== Matches ====
Win Draw Loss

| 2 August 2019 1 | PEC Zwolle | 1 – 3 | Willem II | Zwolle |
| | Lennart Thy 39'; Jarno Westerman (yellow card) 89' | Report; Matchreport | 41', 72' (yellow card) 90+1' Vangelis Pavlidis; 46' (o.g.) Clint Leemans | Stadium: MAC³PARK Stadion; Attendance: 13,342; Referee: Jeroen Manschot |

| 11 August 2019 2 | FC Utrecht | 3 – 1 | PEC Zwolle | Utrecht |
| | Sean Klaiber (yellow card) 15'; Simon Gustafson (yellow card) 44' (goal) 49' (pen.); Sander van der Streek 47'; Willem Janssen 73' | Report; Matchreport | (yellow card) 10' Dean Huiberts; 16' Gustavo Hamer | Stadium: Stadion Galgenwaard; Attendance: 18,736; Referee: Siemen Mulder |

| 16 August 2019 3 | SBV Vitesse | 3 – 0 | PEC Zwolle | Arnhem |
| | Bryan Linssen (yellow card) 51' (goal) 80'; Tim Matavž 52' (pen.); Vyacheslav Karavayev 64' | Report; Matchreport | (yellow card) 19' Zian Flemming; (yellow card) 42' Thomas Bruns; (yellow card) 45+3' Gustavo Hamer | Stadium: GelreDome; Attendance: 12,273; Referee: Rob Dieperink |

| 25 August 2019 4 | PEC Zwolle | 2 – 2 | Sparta Rotterdam | Zwolle |
| | Iliass Bel Hassani 9'; Pelle Clement (yellow card) 45+3'; Rick Dekker (yellow card) 51'; Lennart Thy 56' | Report; Matchreport | 8' Ragnar Ache; (yellow card) 23' Bart Vriends; (yellow card) 44' Adil Auassar; 81' Lars Veldwijk | Stadium: MAC³PARK Stadion; Attendance: 12,532; Referee: Richard Martens |

| 30 August 2019 5 | FC Emmen | 1 – 3 | PEC Zwolle | Emmen |
| | Nick Bakker 6' (yellow card) 77'; Filip Ugrinic (yellow card) 24'; Sergio Peña (yellow card) 36'; Keziah Veendorp (yellow card) 65'; Wouter Marinus (yellow card) 90+2' | Report; Matchreport | 17' Dennis Johnsen; 27' Thomas Bruns; 38' Iliass Bel Hassani | Stadium: De Oude Meerdijk; Attendance: 8,293; Referee: Dennis Higler |

| 15 September 2019 6 | PEC Zwolle | 6 – 2 | RKC Waalwijk | Zwolle |
| | Iliass Bel Hassani 26'; Gustavo Hamer (yellow card) 38' (goal) 90+3'; Reza Ghoochannejhad 60', 81', 83', 88' | Report; Matchreport | 28' Melle Meulensteen; (yellow card) 31' Stanley Elbers; 34' Clint Leemans; (yellow card) 68' Juriën Gaari | Stadium: MAC³PARK Stadion; Attendance: 13,028; Referee: Jeroen Manschot |

| 21 September 2019 7 | FC Groningen | 2 – 0 | PEC Zwolle | Groningen |
| | Ramon Pascal Lundqvist 19'; Ajdin Hrustić 59'; Azor Matusiwa (yellow card) 64' | Report; Matchreport | | Stadium: Euroborg; Attendance: 16,471; Referee: Sander van der Eijk |

| 29 September 2019 8 | PEC Zwolle | 0 – 4 | PSV Eindhoven | Zwolle |
| | Gustavo Hamer (yellow card) 27' | Report; Matchreport | (yellow card) 30' Nick Viergever; 39' Pablo Rosario; (yellow card) 67' Jeroen Zoet; 68' Donyell Malen; 72' Ritsu Doan; (yellow card) 86' Cody Gakpo; 90+4' Érick Gutiérrez | Stadium: MAC³PARK Stadion; Attendance: 13,482; Referee: Dennis Higler |

| 5 October 2019 9 | SC Heerenveen | 1 – 0 | PEC Zwolle | Heerenveen |
| | Mitchell van Bergen 45' | Report; Matchreport | (yellow card) 90+5' Vito van Crooy | Stadium: Abe Lenstra Stadion; Attendance: 16,632; Referee: Danny Makkelie |

| 20 October 2019 10 | PEC Zwolle | 3 – 1 | ADO Den Haag | Zwolle |
| | Kenneth Paal (yellow card) 12'; Iliass Bel Hassani 38'; Reza Ghoochannejhad 74'; Pelle Clement 89' (yellow card) 90+4'; Dennis Johnsen (yellow card) 90+6' | Report; Matchreport | Michiel Kramer 8'; Tom Beugelsdijk (yellow card) 31'; Bilal Ould-Chikh (yellow card) 89' | Stadium: MAC³PARK Stadion |

| 26 October 2019 11 | Heracles Almelo | 4 – 0 | PEC Zwolle | Almelo |
| | Lennart Czyborra 17'; Silvester van der Water 65'; Mauro Júnior 80'; Joey Konings 90+1' | Report; Matchreport | (yellow card) 13' Pelle Clement | Stadium: Polman Stadion; Attendance: 10,157; Referee: Martin Pérez |

| 1 November 2019 12 | PEC Zwolle | 2 – 4 | Ajax | Zwolle |
| | Gustavo Hamer (yellow card) 7' (goal) 36'; Mustafa Saymak (yellow card) 57' (goal) 62'; Pelle Clement (yellow card) 63' | Report; Matchreport | 6', 11' Quincy Promes; 20', 88' David Neres; (yellow card) 66' Donny van der Beek | Stadium: MAC³PARK Stadion; Attendance: 14,000; Referee: Björn Kuipers |

| 10 November 2019 13 | FC Twente | 2 – 1 | PEC Zwolle | Enschede |
| | Haris Vučkić 16'; Joel Latibeaudiere 25' | Report; Matchreport | 61' Reza Ghoochannejhad; (yellow card) 81' Rick Dekker; (yellow card) 85' Thomas Lam; (yellow card) 90+2' Iliass Bel Hassani | Stadium: De Grolsch Veste; Attendance: 26,900; Referee: Kevin Blom |

| 23 November 2019 14 | PEC Zwolle | 3 – 1 | Fortuna Sittard | Zwolle |
| | Mustafa Saymak 4'; Rick Dekker (yellow card) 45+4'; Reza Ghoochannejhad (red card) 57'; Vito van Crooy (yellow card) 59'; Iliass Bel Hassani 65'; Lennart Thy 90+4' | Report; Matchreport | (red card) 42' Amadou Ciss; (yellow card) 64' Cian Harries; 89' Vitalie Damașcan | Stadium: MAC³PARK Stadion; Attendance: 13,912; Referee: Joey Kooij |

| 1 December 2019 15 | Feyenoord | 1 – 0 | PEC Zwolle | Rotterdam |
| | Steven Berghuis 23' | Report; Matchreport | | Stadium: De Kuip; Attendance: 44,513; Referee: Allard Lindhout |

| 7 December 2019 16 | PEC Zwolle | 0 – 3 | AZ Alkmaar | Zwolle |
| | | Report; Matchreport | 15' Myron Boadu; 43', 65' Oussama Idrissi | Stadium: MAC³PARK Stadion; Attendance: 13,708; Referee: Serdar Gözübüyük |

| 14 December 2019 17 | VVV-Venlo | 1 – 2 | PEC Zwolle | Venlo |
| | Aaron Bastiaans 77' | Report; Matchreport | 11' (yellow card) 34' Kenneth Paal; 24' Pelle Clement; (yellow card) 90+2' Gustavo Hamer | Stadium: De Koel; Attendance: 6,861; Referee: Marc Nagtegaal |

| 21 December 2019 18 | PSV Eindhoven | 4 – 1 | PEC Zwolle | Eindhoven |
| | Jorrit Hendrix 18'; Mohammed Ihattaren 26'; Bruma 50'; Nick Viergever (yellow card) 60'; Cody Gakpo 72' | Report; Matchreport | (yellow card) 8' Rick Dekker; 12' Mustafa Saymak; (yellow card) 43' Vito van Crooy; (yellow card) 68' Kenneth Paal; (yellow card) 85' Lennart Thy | Stadium: Philips Stadion; Attendance: 33,000; Referee: Jeroen Manschot |

| 17 January 2020 19 | PEC Zwolle | 3 – 3 | FC Utrecht | Zwolle |
| | Dean Huiberts (yellow card) 25'; Mike van Duinen 27'; Kenneth Paal 53' (yellow card) 67'; Yuta Nakayama 89' | Report; Matchreport | 24' (pen.) Simon Gustafson; (yellow card) 42' Mitchell van Rooijen; (yellow card) 45+1' Joris van Overeem; (yellow card) 70' Mark van der Maarel; 71' Gyrano Kerk; (yellow card) 77' Sean Klaiber; 86' Abass Issah | Stadium: MAC³PARK Stadion; Attendance: 13,102; Referee: Jochem Kamphuis |

| 26 January 2020 20 | Willem II | 0 – 0 | PEC Zwolle | Tilburg |
| | Pol Llonch (yellow card) 28'; Freek Heerkens (yellow card) 38'; Sebastian Holmén (yellow card) 90+5' | Report; Matchreport | (yellow card) 43' Kenneth Paal; (red card) 79' Thomas Lam; (yellow card) 85' Pelle Clement | Stadium: Koning Willem II Stadion; Attendance: 13,337; Referee: Erwin Blank |

| 1 February 2020 21 | PEC Zwolle | 1 – 0 | FC Groningen | Zwolle |
| | Yuta Nakayama 43'; Sai van Wermeskerken (yellow card) 77'; Bram van Polen (yellow card) 90+5' | Report; Matchreport | (yellow card) 29' Mike te Wierik; (yellow card) 30' Sam Schreck; (yellow card) 90+5' Bart van Hintum | Stadium: MAC³PARK Stadion; Attendance: 12,844; Referee: Pol van Boekel |

| 8 February 2020 22 | RKC Waalwijk | 0 – 0 | PEC Zwolle | Waalwijk |
| | Juriën Gaari (yellow card) 28'; Paul Quasten (yellow card) 85'; Tijjani Reijnders (yellow card) 88' | Report; Matchreport | (yellow card) 33' Rico Strieder; (yellow card) 62' Thomas Lam; (yellow card) 90+3' Gustavo Hamer | Stadium: Mandemakers Stadion; Attendance: 5,257; Referee: Siemen Mulder |

| 16 February 2020 23 | PEC Zwolle | 3 – 4 | Feyenoord | Zwolle |
| | Lennart Thy 5' (pen.), 59'; Mike van Duinen 11'; Bram van Polen (yellow card) 52'; Gustavo Hamer (yellow card) 87' | Report; Matchreport | (yellow card) 30' Jens Toornstra; 38' Leroy Fer; 51', 65' Steven Berghuis; 88' (yellow card) 88' Róbert Boženík | Stadium: MAC³PARK Stadion; Attendance: 13,822; Referee: Serdar Gözübüyük |

| 22 February 2020 24 | AZ Alkmaar | 2 – 0 | PEC Zwolle | Alkmaar |
| | Teun Koopmeiners (penalty missed) 54' (pen.), 60' (pen.) | Report; Matchreport | (yellow card) 42' Michael Zetterer; (yellow card) 59' Kenneth Paal | Stadium: AFAS Stadion; Attendance: 15,306; Referee: Jochem Kamphuis |

| 29 February 2020 25 | PEC Zwolle | 4 – 3 | SBV Vitesse | Zwolle |
| | Gustavo Hamer 6'; Kenneth Paal 74'; Reza Ghoochannejhad 90' (pen.); Pelle Clement 90+4' | Report; Matchreport | 6' Tim Matavž; (yellow card) 18' Matúš Bero; 33', 90+2' (yellow card) 81' Oussama Tannane | Stadium: MAC³PARK Stadion; Attendance: 13,088; Referee: Allard Lindhout |

| 6 March 2020 26 | Fortuna Sittard | 1 – 1 | PEC Zwolle | Sittard |
| | Nikolai Baden Frederiksen (yellow card) 13'; George Cox 71'; Tesfaldet Tekie (yellow card) 89' | Report; Matchreport | (yellow card) 37' Jarni Koorman; (yellow card) 86' Gustavo Hamer; 90' (pen.) Lennart Thy | Stadium: Fortuna Sittard Stadion; Attendance: 10,071; Referee: Martin van den Kerkhof |

| 14 March 2020 27 | PEC Zwolle | Cancelled | Heracles Almelo | Zwolle |
| | | Report | | Stadium: MAC³PARK Stadion |
Note: Match was initially scheduled for 14 March 2020, but cancelled due to the COVID-19 pandemic.

| 21 March 2020 28 | PEC Zwolle | Cancelled | VVV-Venlo | Zwolle |
| | | Report | | Stadium: MAC³PARK Stadion |
Note: Match was initially scheduled for 21 March 2020, but cancelled due to the COVID-19 pandemic.

| 5 April 2020 29 | Ajax | Cancelled | PEC Zwolle | Amsterdam |
| | | Report | | Stadium: Johan Cruyff Arena |
Note: Match was initially scheduled for 5 April 2020, but cancelled due to the COVID-19 pandemic.

| 12 April 2020 30 | PEC Zwolle | Cancelled | FC Twente | Zwolle |
| | | Report | | Stadium: MAC³PARK Stadion |
Note: Match was initially scheduled for 12 April 2020, but cancelled due to the COVID-19 pandemic.

| 21 April 2020 31 | Sparta Rotterdam | Cancelled | PEC Zwolle | Rotterdam |
| | | Report | | Stadium: Sparta Stadion Het Kasteel |
Note: Match was initially scheduled for 21 April 2020, but cancelled due to the COVID-19 pandemic.

| 25 April 2020 32 | PEC Zwolle | Cancelled | SC Heerenveen | Zwolle |
| | | Report | | Stadium: MAC³PARK Stadion |
Note: Match was initially scheduled for 25 April 2020, but cancelled due to the COVID-19 pandemic.

| 3 May 2020 33 | PEC Zwolle | Cancelled | FC Emmen | Zwolle |
| | | Report | | Stadium: MAC³PARK Stadion |
Note: Match was initially scheduled for 3 May 2020, but cancelled due to the COVID-19 pandemic.

| 10 May 2020 34 | ADO Den Haag | Cancelled | PEC Zwolle | The Hague |
| | | Report | | Stadium: Cars Jeans Stadion |
Note: Match was initially scheduled for 10 May 2020, but cancelled due to the COVID-19 pandemic.

=== KNVB Cup ===
| 29 October 2019 1st round | HSV Hoek | 0 – 3 | PEC Zwolle | Hoek |
| 19:45 CET | Ruben de Jager (yellow card) 39'; Jonathan Constancia (yellow card) 87' | Report; Matchreport | (yellow card) 17' Yuta Nakayama; 58', 90+2' Lennart Thy; 90+1' Dennis Johnsen | Stadium: Sportpark Denoek; Attendance: 1,500; Referee: Laurens Gerrets |

| 17 December 2019 2nd round | Fortuna Sittard | 3 – 0 | PEC Zwolle | Sittard |
| 20:45 CET | Bassala Sambou 17'; Rasmus Karjalainen 43'; George Cox (yellow card) 55'; Jorrit Smeets (yellow card) 65'; Darryl Lachman 71' (o.g.); Àlex Carbonell (yellow card) 85' | Report; Matchreport | (yellow card) 36' Rick Dekker; (yellow card) 59' Gustavo Hamer; (yellow card) 67' Vito van Crooy | Stadium: Fortuna Sittard Stadion; Attendance: 2,322; Referee: Christiaan Bax |

== Statistics ==
=== Appearances and goals ===
| No. | Pos | Nat | Player | Total | | Eredivisie | | KNVB Cup | |
| No. | Pos | Nat | Player | Apps | Goals | Apps | Goals | Apps | Goals |
|---|---|---|---|---|---|---|---|---|---|
| 1 | GK | (Netherlands) NED | Xavier Mous | 14 | 0 | 13 | 0 | 1 | 0 |
| 2 | DF | (Netherlands) NED | Bram van Polen | 8 | 0 | 7+1 | 0 | 0 | 0 |
| 3 | DF | (Netherlands) NED | Thomas Lam | 17 | 0 | 15 | 0 | 2 | 0 |
| 4 | DF | (Japan) JPN | Yuta Nakayama | 15 | 2 | 13+1 | 2 | 1 | 0 |
| 5 | DF | (Netherlands) NED | Kenneth Paal | 19 | 3 | 17 | 3 | 2 | 0 |
| 6 | MF | (Netherlands) NED | Mustafa Saymak | 15 | 3 | 12+3 | 3 | 0 | 0 |
| 7 | FW | (Netherlands) NED | Vito van Crooy | 18 | 0 | 11+5 | 0 | 2 | 0 |
| 8 | MF | (Iran) IRI | Reza Ghoochannejhad | 14 | 7 | 7+6 | 7 | 0+1 | 0 |
| 9 | FW | (Netherlands) NED | Mike van Duinen | 13 | 2 | 9+3 | 2 | 1 | 0 |
| 10 | FW | (Germany) GER | Lennart Thy | 26 | 7 | 20+4 | 5 | 2 | 2 |
| 13 | MF | (Germany) GER | Rico Strieder | 6 | 0 | 6 | 0 | 0 | 0 |
| 15 | DF | (Netherlands) NED | Sam Kersten | 15 | 0 | 12+3 | 0 | 0 | 0 |
| 16 | GK | (Germany) GER | Michael Zetterer | 14 | 0 | 13 | 0 | 1 | 0 |
| 17 | FW | (Norway) NOR | Dennis Johnsen | 25 | 2 | 10+13 | 1 | 1+1 | 1 |
| 19 | MF | (Netherlands) NED | Rick Dekker | 17 | 0 | 13+3 | 0 | 1 | 0 |
| 22 | MF | (Netherlands) NED | Pelle Clement | 26 | 3 | 24 | 3 | 2 | 0 |
| 23 | DF | (Netherlands) NED | Etiënne Reijnen | 4 | 0 | 3+1 | 0 | 0 | 0 |
| 30 | MF | (Netherlands) NED | Dean Huiberts | 13 | 0 | 7+4 | 0 | 2 | 0 |
| 31 | DF | (Japan) JPN | Sai van Wermeskerken | 20 | 0 | 14+4 | 0 | 1+1 | 0 |
| 32 | MF | (Netherlands) NED | Jarni Koorman | 3 | 0 | 1+2 | 0 | 0 | 0 |
| 33 | DF | (France) FRA | Anthony Dekono | 0 | 0 | 0 | 0 | 0 | 0 |
| 34 | FW | (Netherlands) NED | Jarno Westerman | 5 | 0 | 1+3 | 0 | 0+1 | 0 |
| 36 | DF | (France) FRA | Marc Olivier Doue | 1 | 0 | 0+1 | 0 | 0 | 0 |
| 38 | MF | (Netherlands) NED | Gustavo Hamer | 26 | 4 | 25 | 4 | 1 | 0 |
| 39 | FW | (Netherlands) NED | Quinten van den Heerik | 0 | 0 | 0 | 0 | 0 | 0 |
| 40 | GK | (Netherlands) NED | Mike Hauptmeijer | 0 | 0 | 0 | 0 | 0 | 0 |
| 47 | DF | (Netherlands) NED | Destan Bajselmani | 3 | 0 | 1+2 | 0 | 0 | 0 |
| 48 | MF | (Netherlands) NED | Gabi Caschili | 0 | 0 | 0 | 0 | 0 | 0 |
| 49 | MF | (Netherlands) NED | Thomas van den Belt | 0 | 0 | 0 | 0 | 0 | 0 |
Players sold or loaned out after the start of the season:
| 8 | MF | (Netherlands) NED | Clint Leemans | 1 | 0 | 0+1 | 0 | 0 | 0 |
| 11 | MF | (Netherlands) NED | Iliass Bel Hassani | 14 | 5 | 11+2 | 5 | 0+1 | 0 |
| 14 | MF | (Netherlands) NED | Zian Flemming | 4 | 0 | 2+2 | 0 | 0 | 0 |
| 20 | MF | (Netherlands) NED | Thomas Bruns | 8 | 1 | 5+3 | 1 | 0 | 0 |
| 25 | FW | (Netherlands) NED | Stanley Elbers | 2 | 0 | 1+1 | 0 | 0 | 0 |
| 29 | DF | (Curaçao) CUW | Darryl Lachman | 15 | 0 | 12+1 | 0 | 2 | 0 |

Last updated: 6 October 2019
Source: Competitions

=== Goalscorers ===
| No. | Pos | Nat | Name | Eredivisie | KNVB Cup | Total |
|---|---|---|---|---|---|---|
| 8 | FW | (Iran) | Reza Ghoochannejhad | 7 | 0 | 7 |
| 10 | FW | (Germany) | Lennart Thy | 5 | 2 | 7 |
| 11 | MF | (Netherlands) | Iliass Bel Hassani | 5 | 0 | 5 |
| 38 | MF | (Netherlands) | Gustavo Hamer | 4 | 0 | 4 |
| 6 | MF | (Netherlands) | Mustafa Saymak | 3 | 0 | 3 |
| 5 | MF | (Netherlands) | Kenneth Paal | 3 | 0 | 3 |
| 22 | MF | (Netherlands) | Pelle Clement | 3 | 0 | 3 |
| 4 | MF | (Japan) | Yuta Nakayama | 2 | 0 | 2 |
| 9 | MF | (Netherlands) | Mike van Duinen | 2 | 0 | 2 |
| 17 | FW | (Norway) | Dennis Johnsen | 1 | 1 | 2 |
| 20 | MF | (Netherlands) | Thomas Bruns | 1 | 0 | 1 |
| Own goal | | | | 0 | 0 | 0 |
| Totals | | | | 36 | 3 | 39 |

Last updated: 1 March 2020

=== Disciplinary record ===
| No. | Pos | Nat | Name | Eredivisie | | | KNVB Cup | | | Total | | |
| No. | Pos | Nat | Name | Yellow card | (yellow card) (yellow-red card) | Red card | Yellow card | (yellow card) (yellow-red card) | Red card | Yellow card | (yellow card) (yellow-red card) | Red card |
| 38 | MF | (Netherlands) | Gustavo Hamer | 7 | 0 | 0 | 1 | 0 | 0 | 8 | 0 | 0 |
| 5 | DF | (Netherlands) | Kenneth Paal | 6 | 0 | 0 | 0 | 0 | 0 | 6 | 0 | 0 |
| 22 | MF | (Netherlands) | Pelle Clement | 6 | 0 | 0 | 0 | 0 | 0 | 6 | 0 | 0 |
| 7 | MF | (Netherlands) | Vito van Crooy | 4 | 0 | 0 | 1 | 0 | 0 | 5 | 0 | 0 |
| 19 | MF | (Netherlands) | Rick Dekker | 4 | 0 | 0 | 1 | 0 | 0 | 5 | 0 | 0 |
| 3 | DF | (Finland) | Thomas Lam | 2 | 0 | 1 | 0 | 0 | 0 | 2 | 0 | 1 |
| 2 | DF | (Netherlands) | Bram van Polen | 2 | 0 | 0 | 0 | 0 | 0 | 2 | 0 | 0 |
| 30 | MF | (Netherlands) | Dean Huiberts | 2 | 0 | 0 | 0 | 0 | 0 | 2 | 0 | 0 |
| 6 | MF | (Netherlands) | Mustafa Saymak | 1 | 0 | 0 | 0 | 0 | 0 | 1 | 0 | 0 |
| 11 | MF | (Netherlands) | Iliass Bel Hassani | 1 | 0 | 0 | 0 | 0 | 0 | 1 | 0 | 0 |
| 14 | MF | (Netherlands) | Zian Flemming | 1 | 0 | 0 | 0 | 0 | 0 | 1 | 0 | 0 |
| 17 | FW | (Norway) | Dennis Johnsen | 1 | 0 | 0 | 0 | 0 | 0 | 1 | 0 | 0 |
| 20 | MF | (Netherlands) | Thomas Bruns | 1 | 0 | 0 | 0 | 0 | 0 | 1 | 0 | 0 |
| 34 | FW | (Netherlands) | Jarno Westerman | 1 | 0 | 0 | 0 | 0 | 0 | 1 | 0 | 0 |
| 13 | MF | (Germany) | Rico Strieder | 1 | 0 | 0 | 0 | 0 | 0 | 1 | 0 | 0 |
| 16 | GK | (Germany) | Michael Zetterer | 1 | 0 | 0 | 0 | 0 | 0 | 1 | 0 | 0 |
| 8 | FW | (Iran) | Reza Ghoochannejhad | 0 | 0 | 1 | 0 | 0 | 0 | 0 | 0 | 1 |
| 4 | DF | (Japan) | Yuta Nakayama | 0 | 0 | 0 | 1 | 0 | 0 | 1 | 0 | 0 |
| Totals | | | | 42 | 0 | 2 | 4 | 0 | 0 | 46 | 0 | 2 |

Last updated: 1 March 2020
