= Reza Ghoochannejhad =

Iranian footballer (born 1987)

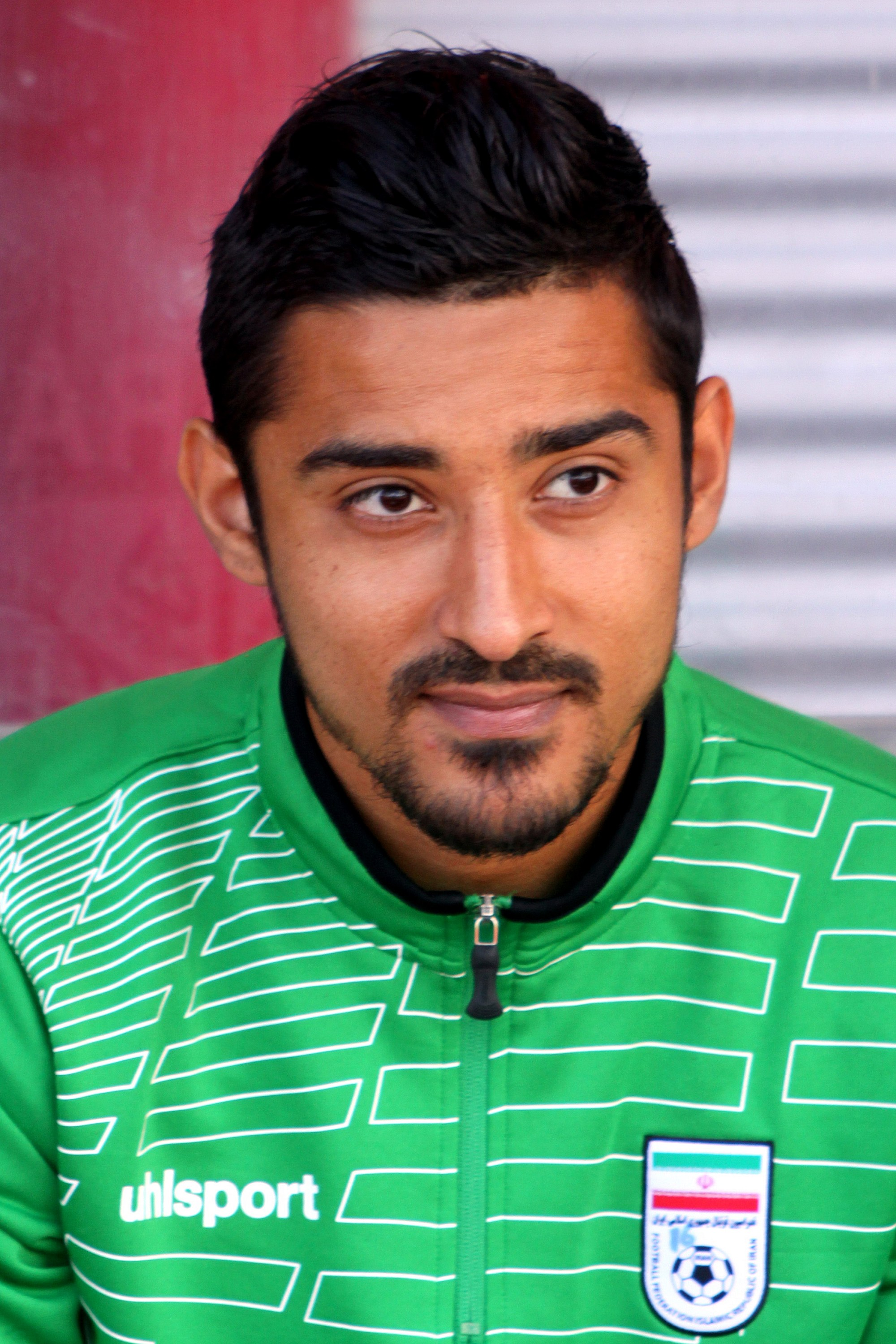
- Ghoochannejhad in 2014

Personal information
- Full name: Reza Ghoochannejhad Nournia
- Date of birth: 20 September 1987 (age 39)
- Place of birth: Mashhad, Iran
- Height: 1.80 m (5 ft 11 in)
- Position: Forward

Youth career
- LAC Frisia 1883
- Cambuur
- 1998–2005: Heerenveen

Senior career*
| Years | Team | Apps | (Gls) |
| 2005–2009 | Heerenveen | 2 | (0) |
| 2006–2007 | → Go Ahead Eagles (loan) | 13 | (4) |
| 2009 | → Emmen (loan) | 12 | (1) |
| 2009–2010 | Go Ahead Eagles | 10 | (6) |
| 2010–2011 | Cambuur | 37 | (15) |
| 2011–2013 | Sint-Truiden | 32 | (17) |
| 2013–2014 | Standard Liège | 8 | (1) |
| 2014–2016 | Charlton Athletic | 38 | (3) |
| 2014–2015 | → Al-Kuwait (loan) | 10 | (11) |
| 2015 | → Al-Wakrah (loan) | 9 | (2) |
| 2016–2018 | Heerenveen | 67 | (27) |
| 2018–2019 | APOEL | 10 | (2) |
| 2019 | → Sydney FC (loan) | 10 | (1) |
| 2019–2021 | PEC Zwolle | 34 | (13) |
| Total | | 292 | (103) |

International career
| 2003 | Netherlands U16 | 1 | (0) |
| 2003–2004 | Netherlands U17 | 4 | (0) |
| 2005 | Netherlands U18 | 1 | (0) |
| 2006–2007 | Netherlands U19 | 3 | (1) |
| 2012–2018 | Iran | 44 | (17) |
- * Club domestic league appearances and goals

Reza "Gucci" Ghoochannejhad Nournia (Persian: رضا قوچان‌نژاد نورنیا; born 20 September 1987) is a former professional footballer who played as a forward.

Having played for the Netherlands at youth level, he switched to the Iran national team at senior level. He scored 17 goals in 44 appearances for Iran, and participated in the 2014 and 2018 FIFA World Cups and the 2015 AFC Asian Cup.

== Early life ==
Ghoochannejhad was born in Mashhad, Iran, and emigrated to the Netherlands at the age of four.

== Club career ==
=== Heerenveen ===
Ghoochannejhad spent twelve years in the Eredivisie side Heerenveen's academy, rising through the ranks at Leeuwarden clubs LAC Frisia 1883 and Cambuur, before making his senior Heerenveen debut against AZ Alkmaar in 2006.

In the summer of 2009, Ghoochannejhad folded his contract with Heerenveen due to his focus on his academic studies at the Vrije University of Amsterdam, studying jurisprudence and political theory. After meeting Marc Overmars, Ghoochannejhad was convinced to sign for the Go Ahead Eagles.

=== Cambuur ===
In his first game for Cambuur, on 22 January 2010 against BV Veendam, he scored his first goal after nine seconds for his new team, tying Johan Cruyff's record for the fastest goal in the Netherlands. During his time at Cambuur, he also played as a winger. On 14 February 2011, Ghoochannejhad scored a hat trick against FC Emmen.

=== Sint-Truiden ===
In June 2011, Ghoochannejhad transferred to Sint-Truiden, scoring his first goal in the Belgian Pro League against Club Brugge.

=== Standard Liège ===
On 31 August 2012, Sint-Truiden came to an agreement with Standard Liège. Ghoochannejhad joined Standard Liège in January 2013 after signing a three-and-a-half-year deal, while scoring 10 goals in 12 matches in the half-season he remained with Sint-Truiden. The following season, he represented Liège in the 2013–14 UEFA Europa League.

=== Charlton Athletic ===
On 30 January 2014, Ghoochannejhad joined Championship side Charlton Athletic on a two-and-a-half-year deal, becoming the second Iranian after Karim Bagheri to play for the Addicks. On 1 February, he made his first appearance for Charlton in a 2–1 defeat away to Wigan Athletic, where he played the full 90 minutes and hit the bar with a shot on goal in the first half. He made his FA Cup debut in a 2–1 fifth round win at Sheffield Wednesday on 24 February. He scored his first goal on 1 April in a 1–0 league win at Leeds United.

==== Al-Kuwait (loan) ====
On 6 August 2014, Ghoochannejhad joined Al-Kuwait on a season-long loan deal. On 15 August, he made his debut as a substitute against Qadsia SC in the Kuwait Super Cup. On 26 August, he scored his first goal in the 2014 AFC Cup against Persipura Jayapura. He scored his first league goal for the club on 30 August in a 1–1 draw against Al Jahra. On 12 September, he scored 4 goals in an 8–1 win over Al-Sahel. He then scored a hat trick in 14 minutes in another game for Al-Kuwait. Ghoochannejhad scored 11 goals in 10 league matches with the club, he won the Kuwaiti Premier League, Kuwait Federation Cup.

==== Al-Wakrah (loan) ====
In February 2015, Ghoochannejhad signed a four-month loan deal with Qatar Stars League club Al-Wakrah. He scored his first goal on 27 February 2015 against Umm Salal. Al-Wakrah escaped relegation on the last day and Ghoochannejhad's loan deal expired at the end of the season.

=== Return to Charlton ===
In the summer of 2015, Ghoochannejhad announced he would be returning to Charlton Athletic for the 2015–16 season. He scored his first goal of the season in a 4–1 League Cup victory against League Two side Dagenham & Redbridge. He scored his first league goal of the season on 7 November 2015 in a 3–1 win against Sheffield Wednesday. He was released by the south London club on Thursday 19 May 2016 following the end of the 2015–16 season. In total, Ghoochannejhad made 42 appearances in all competitions, scoring five goals. He left the club after they got relegated.

=== Return to Heerenveen ===
On 22 June 2016, Ghoochannejhad returned to former club Heerenveen with a two-year contract, In his first friendly match with the club he scored twice and also earned an assist. He scored his first and second goal for Heerenveen on 10 September 2016 in a 3–1 victory against Twente. He scored also twice in January 2017 in a match against ADO Den Haag, it was his second brace of the season and lifted Heerenveen to fourth place in the league. On 22 January 2017, Ghoochannejhad scored a hat-trick in a 4–3 loss against PSV Eindhoven. In the process he became the first ever Iranian to score a hat-trick in a top flight European league and became the first player to score a hat-trick away to PSV since the 1970s. He finished his first season at Eredivisie with 19 goals and became the third highest goalscorer and Heerenveen's 2016-17 player of the year and took place in Eredivisie 2016–17 team of the year. Ghoochannejhad did not continue his good work in his second season in Heerenveen and finished the season with 7 goals and became Heerenveen's top scorer.

=== APOEL ===
Ghoochannejhad signed for Cypriot First Division club APOEL on 23 July 2018 on a two-year contract. He played there for half of a season and scored two goals as well.

=== Sydney FC (loan) ===
Ghoochannejhad signed for A-League club Sydney FC on loan for six months on 31 January 2019. He made his debut on 8 February against the Brisbane Roar and became the first Iranian international in the A-League. He scored his first goal for the club on 1 March against Adelaide United.

He later scored the winning penalty in the 2019 A-League Grand Final and became the first Iranian to win the title in the Australian A-League.

=== PEC Zwolle ===
Ghoochannejhad joined Eredivisie side PEC Zwolle in September 2019. During his debut, after coming on to the pitch he did a poker against RKC Waalwijk and scored four goals for his team to earn the three points and he became the first Eredivisie player in history to score four goals after coming on as a substitute. This also made him the first Iranian to score four goals in one game in one of the top European leagues.

On 22 January 2021, Ghoochannejhad scored three goals after coming on as substitute to make it 3–1 against Willem II and became the first player in the history of the Eredivisie to achieve a hat-trick twice as a substitute. In summer 2021, at the end of his two-year contract, he was released by PEC Zwolle. As of September 2022, he has retired from professional football.

== International career ==
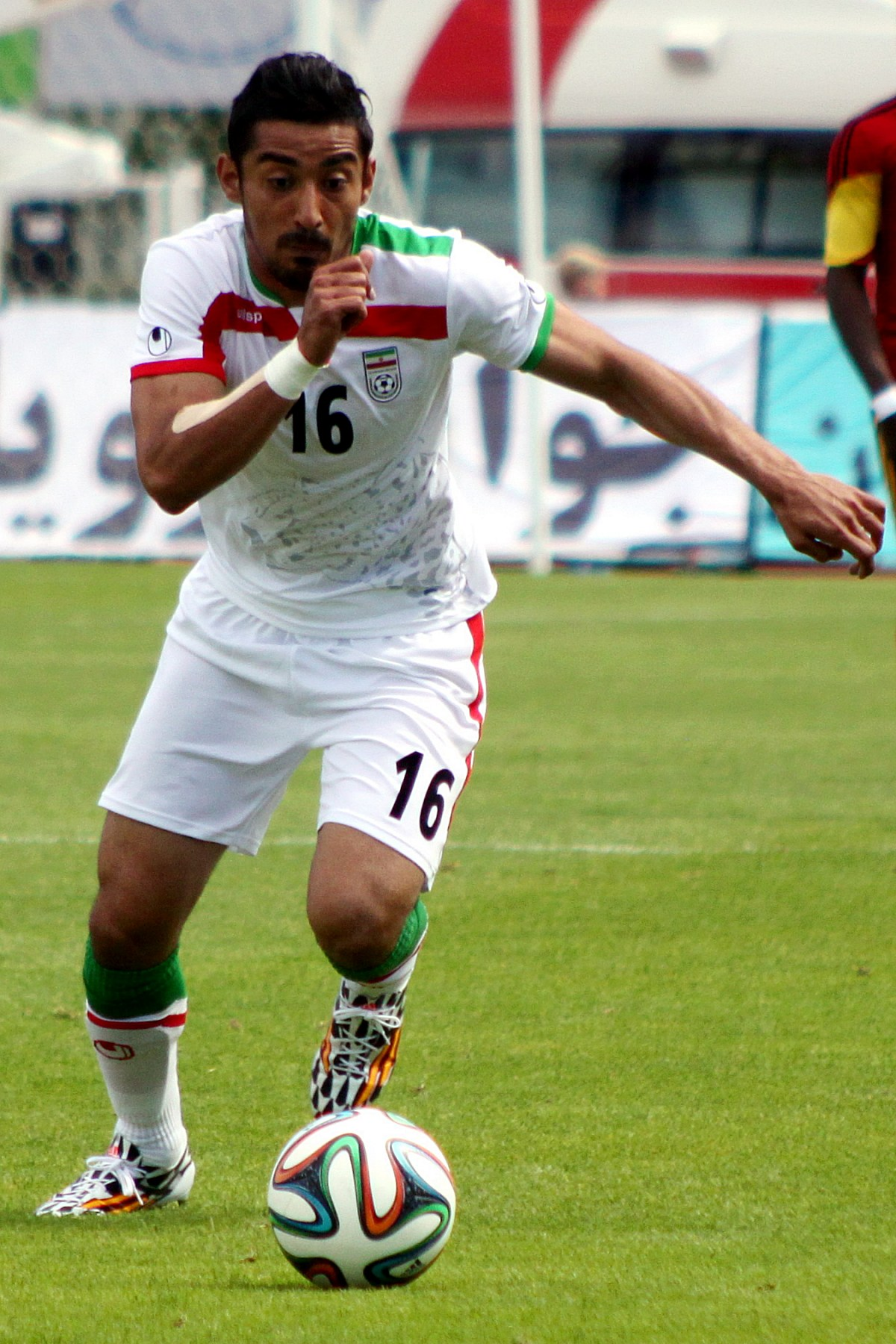
Ghoochannejhad during a match against Angola in 2014

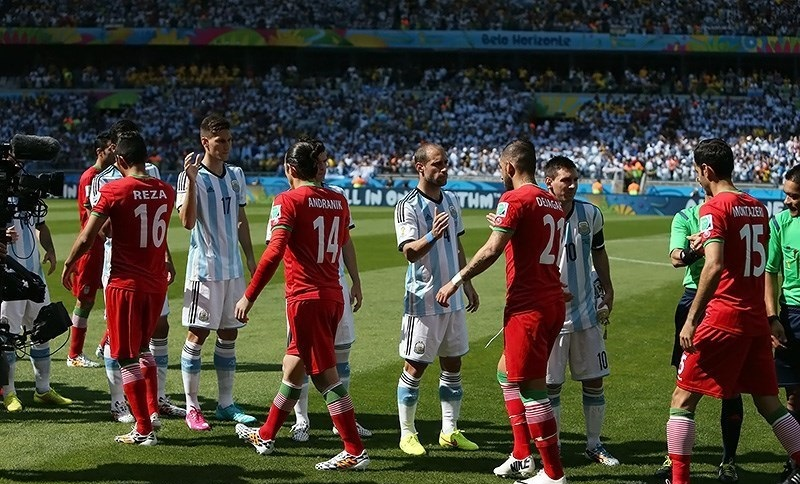
Ghoochannejhad shaking hands with Argentinian players before 2014 FIFA World Cup Group match

Ghoochannejhad represented the Netherlands from 2003 to 2007, having played for the Netherlands U19 national team. After being invited to the Iran national team by coach Carlos Queiroz, he made his senior national team debut on 16 October 2012 in Iran's 1–0 2014 FIFA World Cup qualifier victory against South Korea, while scoring his first two goals in his third international cap against Lebanon in a 5–0 Asian Cup qualifier win. On 4 June 2013, Ghoochannejhad scored the lone goal in a World Cup qualifier against Qatar. Days later, he scored against Lebanon in a 4–0 win. He scored the winning goal again in the next match, a 1–0 win against South Korea. This led to Iran's qualification at the top of their group for the 2014 FIFA World Cup.

His goal-scoring streak continued, scoring in each of the Asian Cup qualifying matches against Thailand and Lebanon to secure Iran's spot in the 2015 AFC Asian Cup as well as becoming the top scorer of the qualifiers and bringing his tally to six goals in six consecutive competitive international matches. Ghoochannejhad scored on 5 March 2014 against Guinea in a friendly to bring his record to seven goals in seven matches with a total of nine goals in eleven matches.

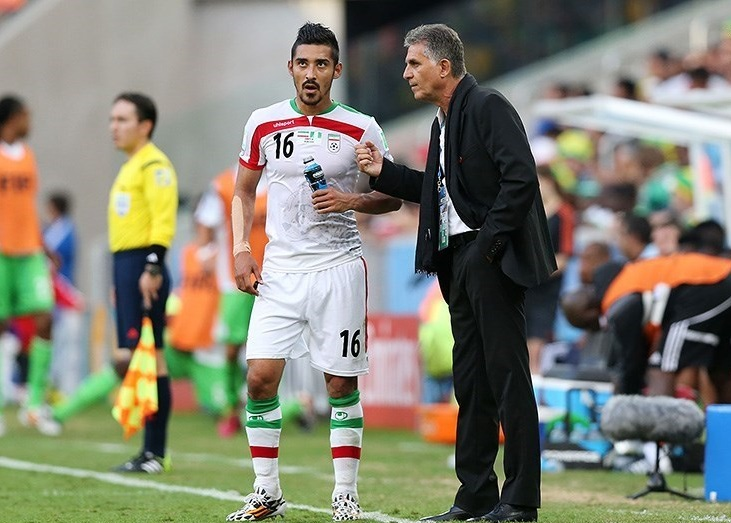
Ghoochannejhad with Carlos Queiroz during 2014 FIFA World Cup match against Nigeria

On 1 June 2014, Ghoochannejhad was called into Iran's 2014 FIFA World Cup squad by Carlos Queiroz. On 25 June 2014, he scored Iran's only goal of the tournament in the 3–1 defeat against Bosnia and Herzegovina. He became the first ever Charlton Athletic player to score at a FIFA World Cup.

On 30 December 2014, Ghoochannejhad was called into Iran's 2015 AFC Asian Cup squad. He scored the only goal in the team's final group stage match against the United Arab Emirates, ensuring Team Melli qualified from Group C in first place. In the quarter-final match against Iraq, Ghoochannejhad scored Iran's third equalizer in the 119th minute as they drew 3–3 at Canberra Stadium and were eventually defeated 7–6 in a penalty shootout.

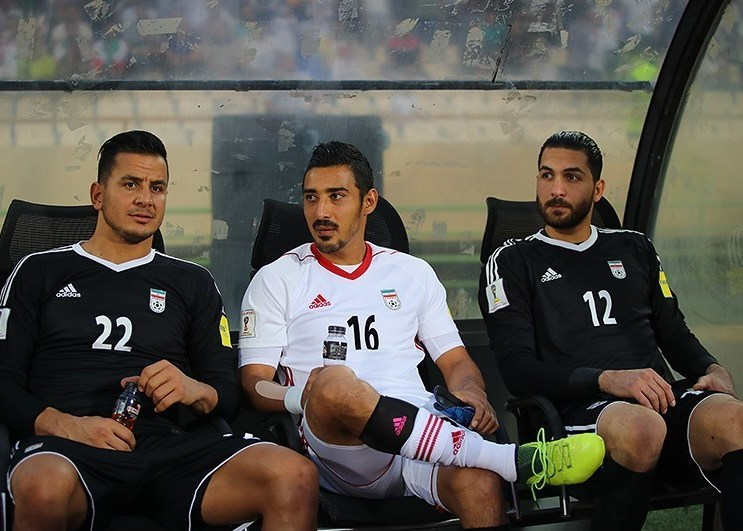
Ghoochannejhad with Iran in 2017

On 1 September 2016, Ghoochannejhad scored a stoppage time winner in a 2–0 victory against Qatar in the final round of Asian World Cup Qualifying.

On 10 November 2016, Ghoochannejhad scored his first hat-trick in a 8–1 victory against Papua New Guinea in a friendly match.

In May 2018 he was named in Iran's preliminary squad for the 2018 FIFA World Cup in Russia, but not played any minutes in the tournament. On 27 June 2018, Ghoochannejhad announced his retirement from international football on his Instagram.

== Style of play ==
Ghoochannejhad has been praised mostly for his sense of goal scoring and also his ability to find the right spot in attacking situations. He has been compared to Iranian legend Khodadad Azizi.

== Outside football ==
he holds a degree in law and political science from Vrije Universiteit Amsterdam. Ghoochannejhad can speak at least four languages including English, Dutch, French and Persian as his mother tongue and he understands German too, he has said that he has also learned Italian and Portuguese. He is keen on playing musical instruments and he can play violin.

== Personal life ==
Ghoochannejhad is the son of Jalal and Mahin Ghoochannejhad. His uncle, Jabar Ghoochannejhad, is a volleyball coach in Iranian Volleyball Super League. Ghoochannejhad married Sarvin Bayat, sister of Iranian actress Sareh Bayat on 30 March 2016 in a private ceremony held in Imam Reza mosque. The couple have a son named Doran (born 29 January 2018).

In an interview, he said that he has been a long time supporter of his home town football club, Aboomoslem.

In March 2024, Ghoochannejhad, along with legends such as Ronaldinho, Javier Pastore, Claude Makelele, Jay Jay Okocha, etc., participated as a special guest in the Paris Saint-Germain club's tour in Qatar titled "LEGENDS DOHA TOUR" and played in this tournament.

== Career statistics ==
=== Club ===
Appearances and goals by club, season and competition
| Club | Season | League | | | National cup | | Continental | | Other (Note: Includes Eredivisie play-offs, Belgian Pro League play-offs, EFL Cup) | | Total | |
| Club | Season | Division | Apps | Goals | Apps | Goals | Apps | Goals | Apps | Goals | Apps | Goals |
|---|---|---|---|---|---|---|---|---|---|---|---|---|
| Heerenveen | 2005–06 | Eredivisie | 1 | 0 | 0 | 0 | — | | 0 | 0 | 1 | 0 |
| Heerenveen | 2006–07 | Eredivisie | 0 | 0 | 0 | 0 | — | | 0 | 0 | 0 | 0 |
| Heerenveen | 2007–08 | Eredivisie | 0 | 0 | 0 | 0 | — | | 0 | 0 | 0 | 0 |
| Heerenveen | 2008–09 | Eredivisie | 1 | 0 | 0 | 0 | — | | 0 | 0 | 1 | 0 |
| Heerenveen | Total | | 2 | 0 | 0 | 0 | 0 | 0 | 0 | 0 | 2 | 0 |
| Go Ahead Eagles (loan) | 2006–07 | Eerste Divisie | 13 | 4 | 0 | 0 | — | | 2 | 0 | 15 | 4 |
| FC Emmen (loan) | 2008–09 | Eerste Divisie | 12 | 1 | 0 | 0 | — | | 0 | 0 | 12 | 1 |
| Go Ahead Eagles | 2009–10 | Eerste Divisie | 10 | 6 | 2 | 1 | — | | 0 | 0 | 12 | 7 |
| Cambuur | 2009–10 | Eerste Divisie | 13 | 2 | 0 | 0 | — | | 1 | 0 | 14 | 2 |
| Cambuur | 2010–11 | Eerste Divisie | 24 | 13 | 1 | 1 | — | | 2 | 0 | 27 | 14 |
| Cambuur | Total | | 37 | 15 | 1 | 1 | 0 | 0 | 3 | 0 | 41 | 16 |
| Sint-Truiden | 2011–12 | Belgian Pro League | 22 | 11 | 2 | 1 | — | | 1 | 0 | 25 | 12 |
| Sint-Truiden | 2012–13 | Belgian Second Division | 10 | 6 | 3 | 3 | — | | 0 | 0 | 13 | 9 |
| Sint-Truiden | Total | | 32 | 17 | 5 | 4 | 0 | 0 | 1 | 0 | 38 | 21 |
| Standard Liège | 2012–13 | Belgian Pro League | 7 | 0 | 0 | 0 | 0 | 0 | 2 | 3 | 9 | 3 |
| Standard Liège | 2013–14 | Belgian Pro League | 1 | 1 | 1 | 1 | 7 | 0 | 0 | 0 | 9 | 2 |
| Standard Liège | Total | | 8 | 1 | 1 | 1 | 7 | 0 | 2 | 3 | 18 | 5 |
| Charlton Athletic | 2013–14 | Championship | 15 | 1 | 2 | 0 | — | | 0 | 0 | 17 | 1 |
| Charlton Athletic | 2014–15 | Championship | 0 | 0 | 0 | 0 | — | | 0 | 0 | 0 | 0 |
| Charlton Athletic | 2015–16 | Championship | 23 | 2 | 1 | 1 | — | | 1 | 1 | 25 | 4 |
| Charlton Athletic | Total | | 38 | 3 | 3 | 1 | 0 | 0 | 1 | 1 | 42 | 5 |
| Kuwait SC (loan) | 2014–15 | Kuwaiti Premier League | 10 | 11 | 1 | 0 | 2 | 1 | 1 | 0 | 14 | 12 |
| Al-Wakrah (loan) | 2014–15 | Qatar Stars League | 9 | 2 | 0 | 0 | 0 | 0 | 0 | 0 | 9 | 2 |
| Heerenveen | 2016–17 | Eredivisie | 34 | 19 | 4 | 2 | — | | 1 | 1 | 39 | 22 |
| Heerenveen | 2017–18 | Eredivisie | 33 | 8 | 1 | 1 | — | | 2 | 1 | 36 | 10 |
| Heerenveen | Total | | 67 | 31 | 5 | 3 | 0 | 0 | 3 | 2 | 75 | 36 |
| APOEL | 2018–19 | First Division | 10 | 2 | 1 | 0 | 3 | 0 | 0 | 0 | 14 | 2 |
| Sydney FC (loan) | 2018–19 | A-League | 10 | 1 | 0 | 0 | 6 | 0 | 1 | 0 | 17 | 1 |
| PEC Zwolle | 2019–20 | Eredivisie | 13 | 7 | 1 | 0 | — | | 0 | 0 | 14 | 7 |
| PEC Zwolle | 2020–21 | Eredivisie | 21 | 6 | 1 | 0 | — | | 0 | 0 | 22 | 6 |
| PEC Zwolle | Total | | 34 | 13 | 2 | 0 | — | | 0 | 0 | 36 | 13 |
| Career total | | | 292 | 103 | 21 | 11 | 18 | 1 | 14 | 6 | 345 | 121 |

=== International ===
Appearances and goals by national team and year
| National team | Year | Apps | Goals |
|---|---|---|---|
| Iran | 2012 | 3 | 0 |
| Iran | 2013 | 8 | 8 |
| Iran | 2014 | 8 | 3 |
| Iran | 2015 | 10 | 2 |
| Iran | 2016 | 5 | 4 |
| Iran | 2017 | 6 | 0 |
| Iran | 2018 | 4 | 0 |
| Total | | 44 | 17 |

Scores and results list Iran's goal tally first, score column indicates score after each Ghoochannejhad goal.

List of international goals scored by Reza Ghoochannejhad
| No. | Date | Venue | Opponent | Score | Result | Competition |
|---|---|---|---|---|---|---|
| 1 | 6 February 2013 | Azadi Stadium, Tehran, Iran | Lebanon | 1–0 | 5–0 | 2015 AFC Asian Cup qualification |
| 2 | 6 February 2013 | Azadi Stadium, Tehran, Iran | Lebanon | 4–0 | 5–0 | 2015 AFC Asian Cup qualification |
| 3 | 4 June 2013 | Jassim Bin Hamad Stadium, Doha, Qatar | Qatar | 1–0 | 1–0 | 2014 FIFA World Cup qualification |
| 4 | 11 June 2013 | Azadi Stadium, Tehran, Iran | Lebanon | 3–0 | 4–0 | 2014 FIFA World Cup qualification |
| 5 | 18 June 2013 | Ulsan Munsu Football Stadium, Ulsan, South Korea | South Korea | 1–0 | 1–0 | 2014 FIFA World Cup qualification |
| 6 | 15 October 2013 | Azadi Stadium, Tehran, Iran | Thailand | 2–0 | 2–1 | 2015 AFC Asian Cup qualification |
| 7 | 15 November 2013 | Rajamangala Stadium, Bangkok, Thailand | Thailand | 2–0 | 3–0 | 2015 AFC Asian Cup qualification |
| 8 | 19 November 2013 | Camille Chamoun Sports City Stadium, Beirut, Lebanon | Lebanon | 4–0 | 4–1 | 2015 AFC Asian Cup qualification |
| 9 | 5 March 2014 | Azadi Stadium, Tehran, Iran | Guinea | 1–2 | 1–2 | Friendly |
| 10 | 8 June 2014 | CT Joaquim Grava, São Paulo, Brazil | Trinidad and Tobago | 2–0 | 2–0 | Friendly |
| 11 | 25 June 2014 | Arena Fonte Nova, Salvador, Brazil | Bosnia and Herzegovina | 1–2 | 1–3 | 2014 FIFA World Cup |
| 12 | 19 January 2015 | Brisbane Stadium, Brisbane, Australia | United Arab Emirates | 1–0 | 1–0 | 2015 AFC Asian Cup |
| 13 | 23 January 2015 | Canberra Stadium, Canberra, Australia | Iraq | 3–3 | 3–3 | 2015 AFC Asian Cup |
| 14 | 1 September 2016 | Azadi Stadium, Tehran, Iran | Qatar | 1–0 | 2–0 | 2018 FIFA World Cup qualification |
| 15 | 10 November 2016 | Shah Alam Stadium, Shah Alam, Malaysia | Papua New Guinea | 5–1 | 8–1 | Friendly |
| 16 | 10 November 2016 | Shah Alam Stadium, Shah Alam, Malaysia | Papua New Guinea | 6–1 | 8–1 | Friendly |
| 17 | 10 November 2016 | Shah Alam Stadium, Shah Alam, Malaysia | Papua New Guinea | 7–1 | 8–1 | Friendly |

== Honours ==
Heerenveen

- KNVB Cup: 2008–09

APOEL

- Cypriot First Division: 2018–19

Sydney FC

- A-League: 2018–19

Individual

- Goal Eredivisie Team of the Season: 2016–17
- Heerenveen Player of the Year: 2016–17

Records

- First Charlton Athletic player to score at the FIFA World Cup: 2014
- First Iranian footballer to score a hat-trick in Europe: 2017
- First player to score four goals as a substitute in Eredivisie history: 2019
- First Iranian footballer to score four goals in a single match in Europe: 2019

== See also ==
- Iranians in the Netherlands
