= Kenneth Paal =

Surinamese footballer (born 1997)

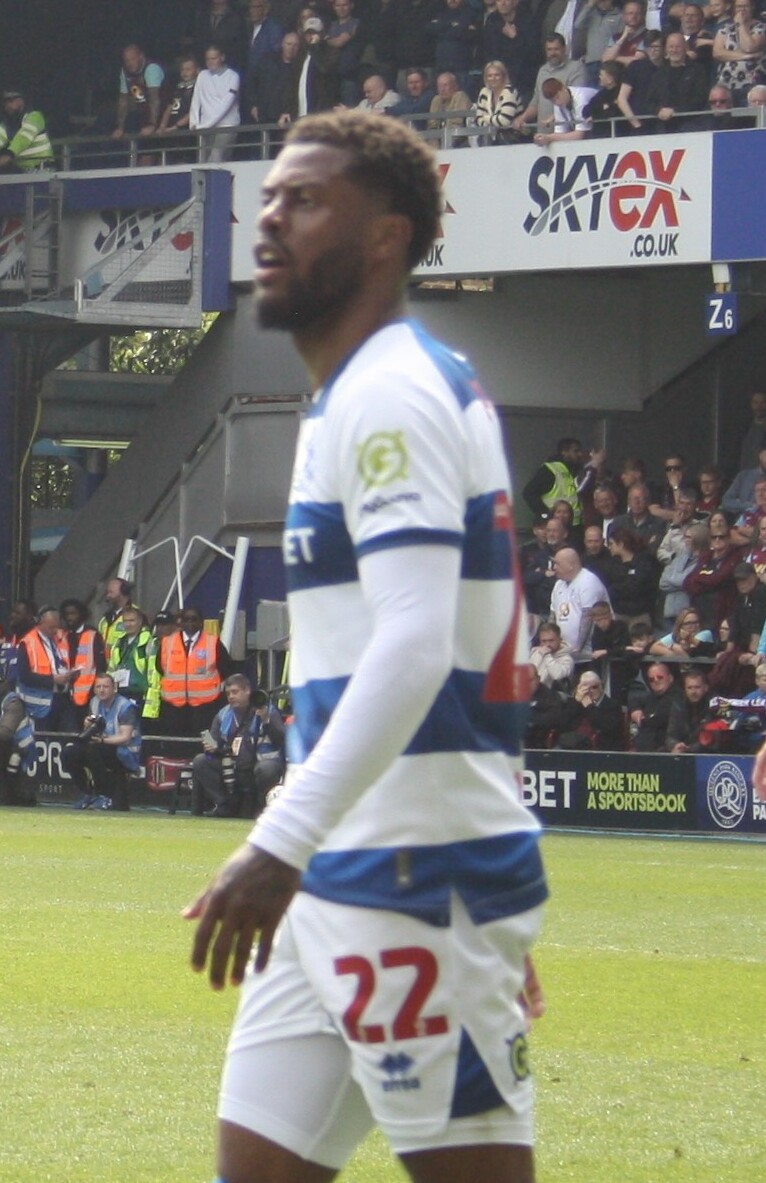
- Paal in 2025

Personal information
- Full name: Kenneth Immanuël Paal
- Date of birth: 24 June 1997 (age 29)
- Place of birth: Arnhem, Netherlands
- Height: 1.64 m (5 ft 5 in)
- Position: Left back

Team information
- Current team: Antalyaspor
- Number: 3

Youth career
- NEC
- –2014: PSV

Senior career*
Years	Team	Apps	(Gls)
2014–2018	Jong PSV	88	(5)
2015–2019	PSV	5	(0)
2018–2019	→ PEC Zwolle (loan)	29	(0)
2019–2022	PEC Zwolle	71	(3)
2022–2025	Queens Park Rangers	123	(6)
2025–	Antalyaspor	34	(0)

International career^{‡}
2012–2014	Netherlands U17	13	(0)
2022–	Suriname	21	(0)
- * Club domestic league appearances and goals as of 10 June 2026 ‡ National team caps and goals as of 05:55, 10 November 2025 (UTC)

Kenneth Immanuël Paal (born 24 June 1997) is a professional footballer who plays as a left back for Antalyaspor in the Süper Lig and the Suriname national team. Born in the Netherlands, Paal represented them at U17 level before switching to Suriname at senior level.

== Club career ==
Paal made his professional debut for Jong PSV playing in the Eerste Divisie, the 2nd tier of professional football in the Netherlands, on 9 August 2014 against Achilles '29. He started in the first eleven at the first fixture of the 2014–15 season.

=== PEC Zwolle ===
In June 2018, Paal joined PEC Zwolle on loan for the 2018–19 season with the club holding the option to buy. In May 2019, he signed a three-year contract with the club.

=== Queens Park Rangers ===
On 19 June 2022, Paal joined Championship club Queens Park Rangers on a three-year contract following the mutual termination of his contract with PEC Zwolle. He scored his first goal for QPR in a 3–0 win against Cardiff City on 19 October 2022.

He departed the club upon the expiration of his contract at the end of the 2024–25 season.

=== Antalyaspor ===
On Friday 11 July, Paal joined Super Lig side Antalyaspor as a free agent at the end of his contract with Queens Park Rangers.

== International career ==
Paal played with the Netherlands under-17 team at the 2014 UEFA European Under-17 Championship. The Netherlands reached the final of the tournament, where they were defeated by England in a penalty shoot-out.

He later took part in the UEFA European Under-19 Championship with the Netherlands under-19 team in both 2015 and 2016.

On 31 May 2022 it was announced that Paal was officially eligible to represent Suriname at the 2022–23 CONCACAF Nations League. Due to contract negotiations for a new club, Paal was unavailable to play for the national team. On 22 September 2022 Paal made his debut for his Suriname, in friendly against Nicaragua. It was held in Almere, Netherlands and resulted in a 2–1 victory for Suriname.

== Personal life ==
Born in the Netherlands, Paal is of Surinamese descent.

== Career statistics ==
As of end of 2024–25 season

Appearances and goals by club, season and competition
Club	Season	League			National cup (Note: Includes KNVB Cup, FA Cup)		League cup (Note: Includes EFL Cup)		Other		Total	
Club	Season	Division	Apps	Goals	Apps	Goals	Apps	Goals	Apps	Goals	Apps	Goals
Jong PSV	2014–15	Eerste Divisie	9	0	—		—		0	0	9	0
Jong PSV	2015–16	Eerste Divisie	34	3	—		—		0	0	34	3
Jong PSV	2016–17	Eerste Divisie	34	2	—		—		0	0	34	2
Jong PSV	2017–18	Eerste Divisie	11	0	—		—		0	0	11	0
Jong PSV	Total		88	5	0	0	0	0	0	0	88	5
PSV	2017–18	Eredivisie	5	0	1	0	—		0	0	6	0
PEC Zwolle (loan)	2018–19	Eredivisie	29	0	3	0	—		0	0	32	0
Pec Zwolle	2019–20	Eredivisie	19	3	2	0	—		0	0	21	3
Pec Zwolle	2020–21	Eredivisie	27	0	1	0	—		0	0	28	0
Pec Zwolle	2021–22	Eredivisie	25	0	0	0	—		0	0	25	0
Pec Zwolle	Total		100	3	6	0	0	0	0	0	106	3
QPR	2022–23	Championship	40	1	1	0	0	0	—		41	1
QPR	2023–24	Championship	44	4	1	0	1	0	—		46	4
QPR	2024–25	Championship	39	1	1	0	3	0	—		43	1
QPR	Total		123	6	3	0	4	0	0	0	130	6
Career total			316	14	10	0	4	0	0	0	330	14
