= Wissel =

- Hamlet
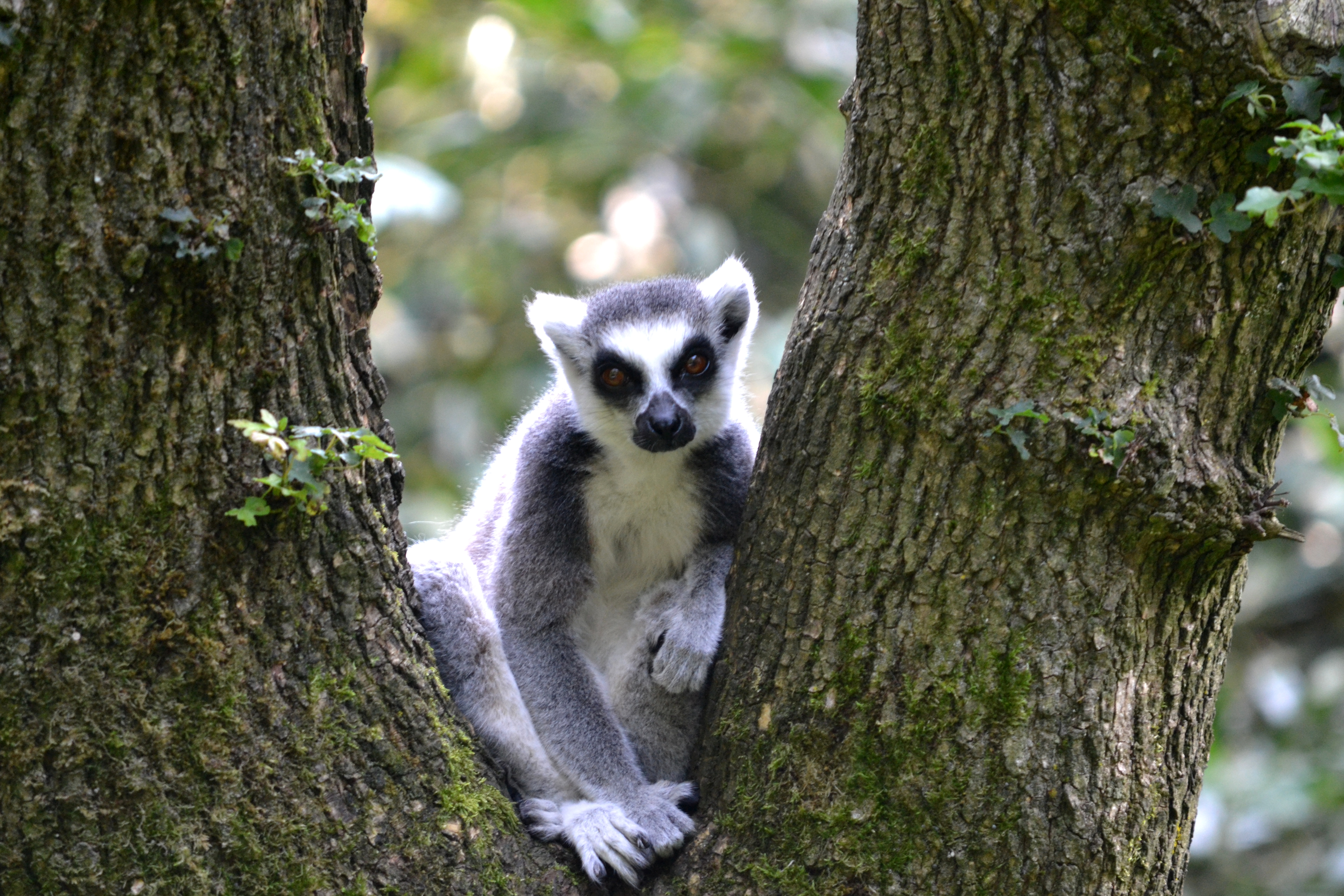
- Ring-tailed lemur in the former zoo

- Location in the province of Gelderland Wissel (Netherlands)
- Coordinates: 52°20′30″N 5°57′17″E
- Country: Netherlands
- Province: Gelderland
- Municipality: Epe
- Elevation: 14 m (46 ft)
- Time zone: UTC+1 (CET)
  - Summer (DST): UTC+2 (CEST)
- Postal code: 8162
- Dialing code: 0578

Wissel is a hamlet in the Dutch province of Gelderland. It is located in the municipality of Epe, about 2 km west of the town of Epe.

It was first mentioned in 1273 as de Wischele. The etymology is not clear. It is not a statistical entity, and the postal authorities have placed it under Epe. In 1840, it was home to 468 people.

In 1967, a miniature zoo opened in Wissel called Dierenpark Wissel. It specialised in small animals. It closed in 2015, and the animals have been relocated to other zoos.
