= Dennis Johnsen =

Norwegian footballer (born 1998)

Personal information
- Full name: Dennis Tørset Johnsen
- Date of birth: 17 February 1998 (age 28)
- Place of birth: Skien, Norway
- Height: 1.85 m (6 ft 1 in)
- Position: Winger

Team information
- Current team: Palermo
- Number: 17

Youth career
- –2013: Tiller IL
- 2013–2015: Rosenborg BK
- 2015–2017: Heerenveen

Senior career*
Years	Team	Apps	(Gls)
2017–2019	Jong Ajax	41	(9)
2017–2020	Ajax	3	(0)
2019	→ Heerenveen (loan)	13	(0)
2019–2020	→ PEC Zwolle (loan)	23	(1)
2020–2024	Venezia	113	(10)
2024–2026	Cremonese	54	(9)
2026–	Palermo	24	(8)

International career^{‡}
2016	Norway U18	2	(0)
2017–2019	Norway U21	17	(2)
2021	Norway	1	(0)
- * Club domestic league appearances and goals as of 11 November 2026 ‡ National team caps and goals as of 11 October 2021

Dennis Tørset Johnsen (born 17 February 1998) is a Norwegian professional footballer who plays as a winger for Serie B club Palermo.

== Club career ==
Johnsen started his career at local club Tiller IL and moved to the youth academy of Rosenborg BK in 2013. In 2015, he joined SC Heerenveen. He signed for Ajax in August 2017. In January 2019, he returned to SC Heerenveen on loan for the rest of the season.

On 25 August 2020, he signed a four-year contract with Serie B club Venezia.

On 1 February 2024, Johnsen moved to Cremonese on a three-and-a-half-year contract.

On 2 February 2026, Johnsen joined Palermo on a long-term contract.

== International career ==
He made his debut for the Norway national football team on 11 October 2021 in a World Cup qualifier against Montenegro.

== Career statistics ==
=== Club ===
As of match played 6 November 2026

Appearances and goals by club, season and competition
Club	Season	League			National Cup		Other		Total	
Club	Season	Division	Apps	Goals	Apps	Goals	Apps	Goals	Apps	Goals
Jong Ajax	2017–18	Eerste Divisie	27	7	–		–		27	7
Jong Ajax	2018–19	Eerste Divisie	14	2	–		–		14	2
Jong Ajax	Total		41	9	–		–		41	9
Ajax	2017–18	Eredivisie	2	0	2	0	–		4	0
Ajax	2018–19	Eredivisie	1	0	0	0	0	0	1	0
Ajax	Total		3	0	2	0	–		5	0
Heerenveen (loan)	2018–19	Eredivisie	13	0	–		–		13	0
PEC Zwolle (loan)	2019–20	Eredivisie	23	1	2	1	–		25	2
Venezia	2020–21	Serie B	32	3	2	3	5 (Note: Appearances in Serie B – Promotion play-offs)	1	39	7
Venezia	2021–22	Serie A	27	1	3	0	–		27	1
Venezia	2022–23	Serie B	33	3	0	0	1	0	34	3
Venezia	2023–24	Serie B	21	3	1	0	–		22	3
Venezia	Total		113	10	6	3	6	1	125	14
Cremonese	2023–24	Serie B	13	2	–		–		13	2
Cremonese	2024–25	Serie B	31	6	2	0	4	2	37	8
Cremonese	2025–26	Serie A	11	1	1	0	–		12	1
Cremonese	Total		55	9	3	0	4	2	62	11
Palermo	2025–26	Serie B	13	1	0	0	2	0	15	1
Palermo	2026–27	Serie B	11	7	2	1	0	0	13	8
Palermo	Total		24	8	2	1	2	0	28	9
Career total			272	37	15	5	12	3	296	45

=== International ===
As of match played 11 October 2021

Appearances and goals by national team and year
National team	Year	Apps	Goals
Norway	2021	1	0
Total		1	0

== Personal life ==
He is the son of retired footballer Tor Gunnar Johnsen and the brother of Mikael Tørset Johnsen.

== Honours ==
Jong Ajax

- Eerste Divisie: 2017–18
