= Destan Bajselmani =

Dutch footballer

Personal information
- Date of birth: 8 February 1999 (age 27)
- Place of birth: Enschede, Netherlands
- Height: 1.80 m (5 ft 11 in)
- Position: Right-back

Youth career
- 2010–2015: Twente
- 2015–2020: PEC Zwolle

Senior career*
Years	Team	Apps	(Gls)
2019–2022	PEC Zwolle	9	(0)

International career^{‡}
2021	Kosovo	4	(0)
- * Club domestic league appearances and goals as of 13 May 2021 ‡ National team caps and goals as of 10 June 2021

Destan Bajselmani (born 8 February 1999) is a professional footballer who last played as a right-back for Dutch club PEC Zwolle. Born in the Netherlands, he represents Kosovo at international level.

== Club career ==
=== PEC Zwolle ===
On 5 October 2019, Bajselmani made his debut as a professional footballer in a 1–0 away defeat against Heerenveen after coming on as a substitute at 33rd minute in place of injured Gustavo Hamer. On 16 June 2020, he signed his first professional contract with Eredivisie side PEC Zwolle after agreeing to a two-year deal. In summer 2021, he was sent back to the reserves after disappointing in pre-season.

== International career ==
=== Under-21 ===
In October 2020, it was reported that Bajselmani had chosen to represent Albania at under-21 level and had received a call-up for a friendly match against Slovenia; however, Albania U21 head coach Alban Bushi later confirmed that he had declined to join Albania and had opted to play for Kosovo, with which he joined their national under-21 team in November 2020 for the UEFA Euro 2021 qualification matches against Albania and Turkey. However, due to injury, he was unable to take part in the matches.

=== Senior ===
On 25 May 2021, Bajselmani received a call-up from Kosovo for the friendly matches against San Marino, Malta, Guinea and Gambia. Seven days later, he made his debut with Kosovo in a friendly match against San Marino after being named in the starting line-up.

== Personal life ==
Bajselmani was born in Enschede, Netherlands to Kosovo Albanian parents from Suva Reka and Skenderaj.
