= Dean Huiberts =

Dutch footballer (born 2000)

Personal information
- Date of birth: 4 May 2000 (age 26)
- Place of birth: Kampen, Netherlands
- Height: 1.86 m (6 ft 1 in)
- Position: Midfielder

Team information
- Current team: Helmond Sport
- Number: 10

Youth career
- –2011: DOS Kampen
- 2011–2018: Twente
- 2018–2019: PEC Zwolle

Senior career*
Years	Team	Apps	(Gls)
2019–2024	PEC Zwolle	91	(7)
2024	→ Beerschot (loan)	10	(0)
2024–2025	Beerschot	13	(0)
2025–2026	Pro Vercelli	23	(1)
2026–	Helmond Sport	6	(2)
- * Club domestic league appearances and goals as of 14 November 2026

Dean Huiberts (born 16 May 2000) is a Dutch professional footballer who plays as a midfielder for Eerste Divisie club Helmond Sport.

== Career ==
Huiberts was born in Kampen and played youth football for local club DOS Kampen and Twente, before moving to the academy of PEC Zwolle in 2018. On 14 June 2019, he signed his first professional contract with PEC Zwolle. He made his professional debut with PEC Zwolle in a 3–1 Eredivisie loss to FC Utrecht on 11 August 2019.

On 30 January 2024, Huiberts moved on loan to Beerschot in Belgium, and helped them to promotion to the top flight within three months under Dirk Kuyt. On 15 July 2024, he returned to Beerschot on a permanent basis.

After a season with Pro Vercelli in Italy, he returned to the Netherlands to play for Helmond Sport.

== Personal life ==
Huiberts is the nephew of the Dutch former footballer Max Huiberts.

== Honours ==
Beerschot

- First Division B/Challenger Pro League: 2023-24
