= Jarno Westerman =

Dutch footballer

Personal information
- Date of birth: 8 June 2002 (age 24)
- Place of birth: Dedemsvaart, Netherlands
- Height: 1.83 m (6 ft 0 in)
- Position: Winger

Team information
- Current team: Urk
- Number: 26

Youth career
- –2013: SCD '83
- 2013–2020: PEC Zwolle

Senior career*
Years	Team	Apps	(Gls)
2019–2022	PEC Zwolle	4	(0)
2022–2023	IJsselmeervogels	14	(0)
2023	DVS '33	11	(0)
2024–2025	DVC Dedemsvaart		
2025–	Urk	0	(0)
- * Club domestic league appearances and goals as of 4 August 2025

Jarno Westerman (born 8 June 2002) is a Dutch professional footballer who plays as a winger for Vierde Divisie club Urk.

== Club career ==
Westerman made his Eredivisie debut for PEC Zwolle on 2 August 2019 in a game against Willem II. He made his first start on 25 August 2019 against Sparta Rotterdam.
