= Gustavo Hamer =

Association football player (born 1997)

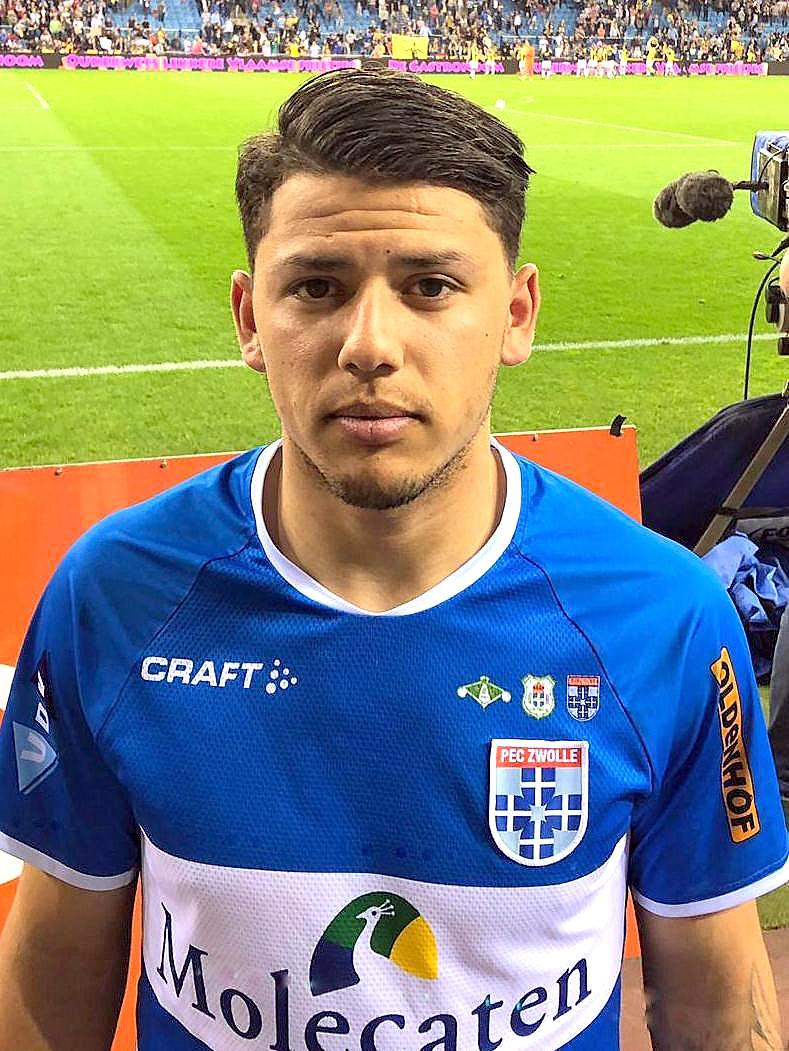
- Hamer with PEC Zwolle in 2019

Personal information
- Full name: Gustavo Martin Emilio Hamer
- Date of birth: 24 June 1997 (age 29)
- Place of birth: Itajaí, Brazil
- Height: 5 ft 7 in (1.70 m)
- Position: Attacking midfielder

Team information
- Current team: Coventry City
- Number: 38

Youth career
- 2011–2016: Feyenoord

Senior career*
Years	Team	Apps	(Gls)
2016–2018	Feyenoord	2	(0)
2017–2018	→ Dordrecht (loan)	34	(3)
2018–2020	PEC Zwolle	48	(4)
2020–2023	Coventry City	123	(17)
2023–2026	Sheffield United	114	(18)
2026–	Coventry City	7	(0)

International career^{‡}
2014	Netherlands U18	1	(0)
2016	Netherlands U20	3	(0)
- * Club domestic league appearances and goals as of 00:45, 22 August 2026 (UTC) ‡ National team caps and goals as of 22 April 2017

Gustavo Martin Emilio Hamer (born 24 June 1997) is a professional footballer who plays as an attacking midfielder for Premier League club Coventry City. Born in Brazil, he has represented the Netherlands at youth level.

After moving to the Netherlands as a child, Hamer began his career at Feyenoord where he progressed through the youth system. He made two appearances for the first team before being loaned out to FC Dordrecht for the 2017–18 season.

== Club career ==
=== Feyenoord ===
Born in Brazil, Hamer moved to the Netherlands as a child. As a youth player he was rejected by ADO Den Haag before joining Feyenoord's youth academy. He progressed well at Feyenoord, and earned caps for both the Netherlands U18 and U20 sides. Hamer made his professional debut on 2 April 2017 in an Eredivisie match against Ajax, coming on as an 89th-minute substitute in a 2–1 loss. Three days later, on 5 April 2017, he would make his second and what would prove to be last appearance for Feyenoord in an 8–0 win against Go Ahead Eagles.

==== Loan to Dordrecht ====
On 7 August 2017, Eerste Divisie club Dordrecht announced the signing of Hamer on a one-year loan deal. He made 39 appearances in all competitions for Dordrecht as they missed out on promotion after qualifying for the playoffs.

=== PEC Zwolle ===
After the conclusion of his loan at Dordrecht, Hamer joined PEC Zwolle from Feyenoord on 2 May 2018. He signed a three-year contract with the club. Hamer made his debut for Zwolle on the opening day of the season, playing 90 minutes in a 3–2 loss against SC Heerenveen. He would go on to make 23 appearances in 2018–19 as Zwolle finished 13th in the Eredivisie. On 11 August 2019, Hamer scored his first goal for the club, netting with a direct free-kick in a 3–1 loss to FC Utrecht. His second season with Zwolle was cut short after the Dutch FA cancelled the remainder of the 2019–20 season due to the COVID-19 pandemic. Hamer finished the season having made 25 appearances and scored 4 goals.

=== Coventry City ===
On 3 July 2020, English club Coventry City completed the signing of Hamer for a fee exceeding £1.5m. He made his debut in a 1–0 EFL Cup victory against Milton Keynes Dons on 5 September. In his fifth appearance for the club, a 3–1 loss against Bournemouth, he was shown a red card for violent conduct which resulted in a three-match suspension. He returned from suspension on 27 October against Middlesbrough and three days later scored his first goal in a 3–2 win over Reading.

On 17 May 2023, he scored the winning goal in the second leg of the Championship playoff semi-final against Middlesbrough to set up a game against Luton Town for the right to play in the Premier League and scored the equalising goal to make the score 1–1, before being defeated on penalties.

=== Sheffield United ===
On 12 August 2023, Hamer signed a four-year deal with recently promoted Premier League club Sheffield United for an undisclosed fee, believed to be in the region of £15 million. On 27 April 2025, he was named EFL Championship Player of the Season.

=== Return to Coventry City ===
On 11 August 2026, almost three years after leaving Coventry City, Hamer re-signed for an undisclosed fee on a new long-term contract.

== International career ==
Hamer was born in Brazil, but adopted and raised in the Netherlands. He is a youth international for the Netherlands at the U20 level.

== Career statistics ==
As of match played 21 November 2026

Appearances and goals by club, season and competition
Club	Season	League			National cup (Note: Includes KNVB Cup, FA Cup)		League cup (Note: Includes EFL Cup)		Europe		Other		Total	
Club	Season	Division	Apps	Goals	Apps	Goals	Apps	Goals	Apps	Goals	Apps	Goals	Apps	Goals
Feyenoord	2016–17	Eredivisie	2	0	0	0	—		0	0	0	0	2	0
Dordrecht (loan)	2017–18	Eerste Divisie	34	3	1	0	—		—		4 (Note: Appearances in Eerste Divisie play-offs)	0	39	3
PEC Zwolle	2018–19	Eredivisie	23	0	1	0	—		—		—		24	0
PEC Zwolle	2019–20	Eredivisie	25	4	1	0	—		—		—		26	4
PEC Zwolle	Total		48	4	2	0	—		—		—		50	4
Coventry City	2020–21	Championship	42	5	1	0	1	0	—		—		44	5
Coventry City	2021–22	Championship	39	3	2	0	0	0	—		—		41	3
Coventry City	2022–23	Championship	41	9	1	0	0	0	—		3 (Note: Appearances in EFL Championship play-offs)	2	45	11
Coventry City	2023–24	Championship	1	0	—		1	0	—		—		2	0
Coventry City	Total		123	17	4	0	2	0	—		3	2	132	19
Sheffield United	2023–24	Premier League	36	4	2	1	—		—		—		38	5
Sheffield United	2024–25	Championship	41	9	0	0	2	0	—		3	1	46	10
Sheffield United	2025–26	Championship	36	5	1	1	1	1	—		—		38	7
Sheffield United	Total		113	18	3	2	3	1	—		3	1	122	22
Coventry City	2026–27	Premier League	7	0	0	0	2	0	—		—		9	0
Career total			327	42	10	2	7	1	0	0	10	3	354	48

== Honours ==
Feyenoord

- Eredivisie: 2016–17
- Johan Cruijff Shield: 2017

Individual

- Coventry City Player of the Year: 2021–22, 2022–23
- EFL Championship Player of the Month: April 2023
- Sheffield United Player of the Year: 2023–24
- EFL Championship Team of the Season: 2024–25
- EFL Championship Player of the Season: 2024–25
- PFA Team of the Year: 2024–25 Championship
