= Sam Kersten =

Dutch footballer

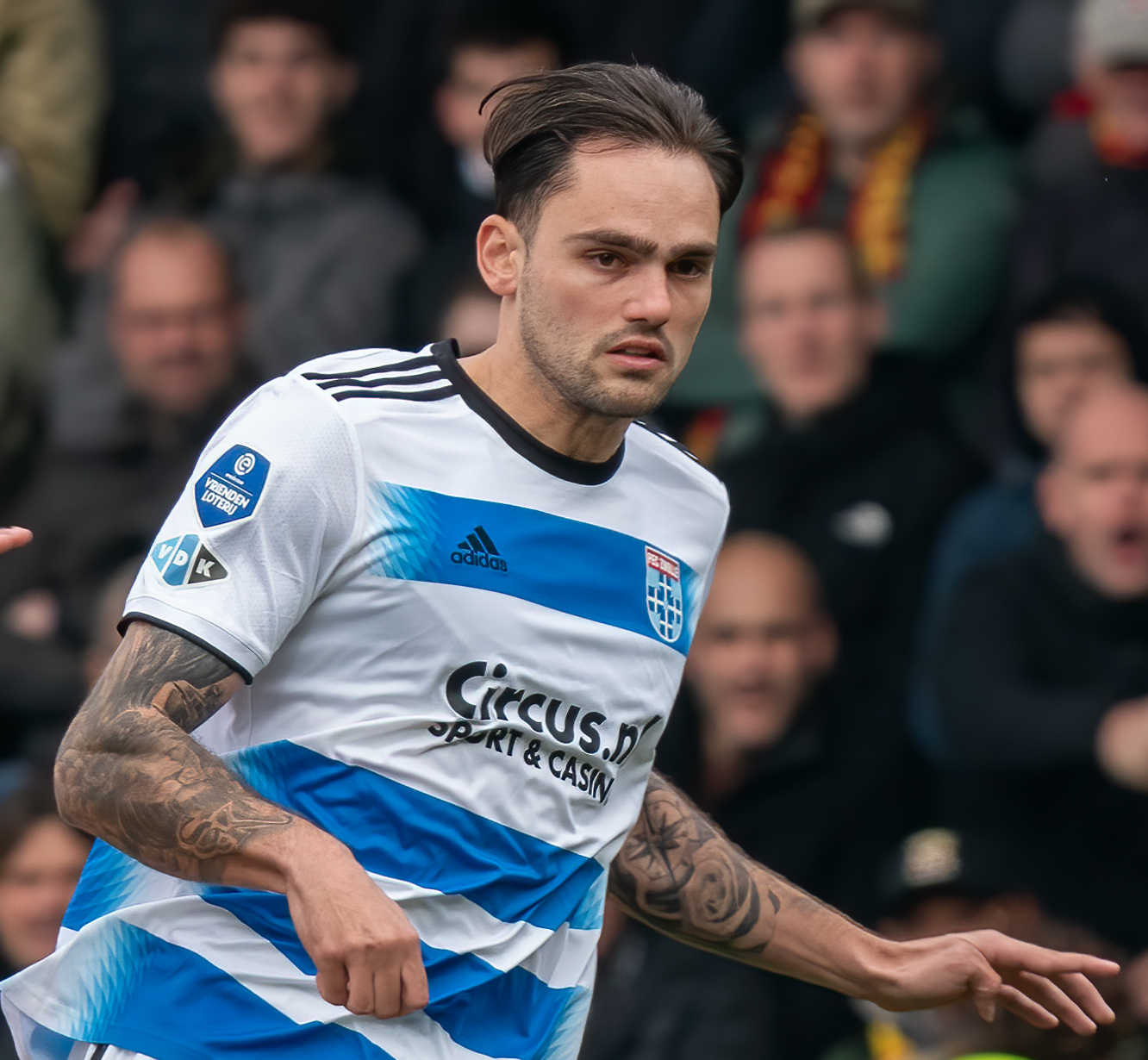
- Kersten with PEC Zwolle in 2024

Personal information
- Date of birth: 30 January 1998 (age 28)
- Place of birth: Nijmegen, Netherlands
- Height: 1.91 m (6 ft 3 in)
- Position: Centre-back

Team information
- Current team: Heerenveen
- Number: 4

Youth career
- VV Ravenstein
- FC Oss
- NEC
- 2011–2014: FC Den Bosch
- 2014–2016: Brabant United

Senior career*
Years	Team	Apps	(Gls)
2016–2019	FC Den Bosch	74	(0)
2019–2024	PEC Zwolle	110	(0)
2024–	Heerenveen	61	(2)
- * Club domestic league appearances and goals as of 19 May 2026

Sam Kersten (born 30 January 1998) is a Dutch professional footballer who plays for Eredivisie club Heerenveen.

== Club career ==
Kersten played for six seasons in the FC Den Bosch youth setup. He made his professional debut in the Eerste Divisie for FC Den Bosch on 2 December 2016 in a game against FC Dordrecht. Kersten then signed a multi-year deal with Den Bosch after making a number of first team appearances.

On 8 April 2024, Kersten signed a three-year contract with Heerenveen, effective 1 July.

Kersten primarily plays as a central defender.
