= Rick Dekker =

Dutch footballer (born 1995)

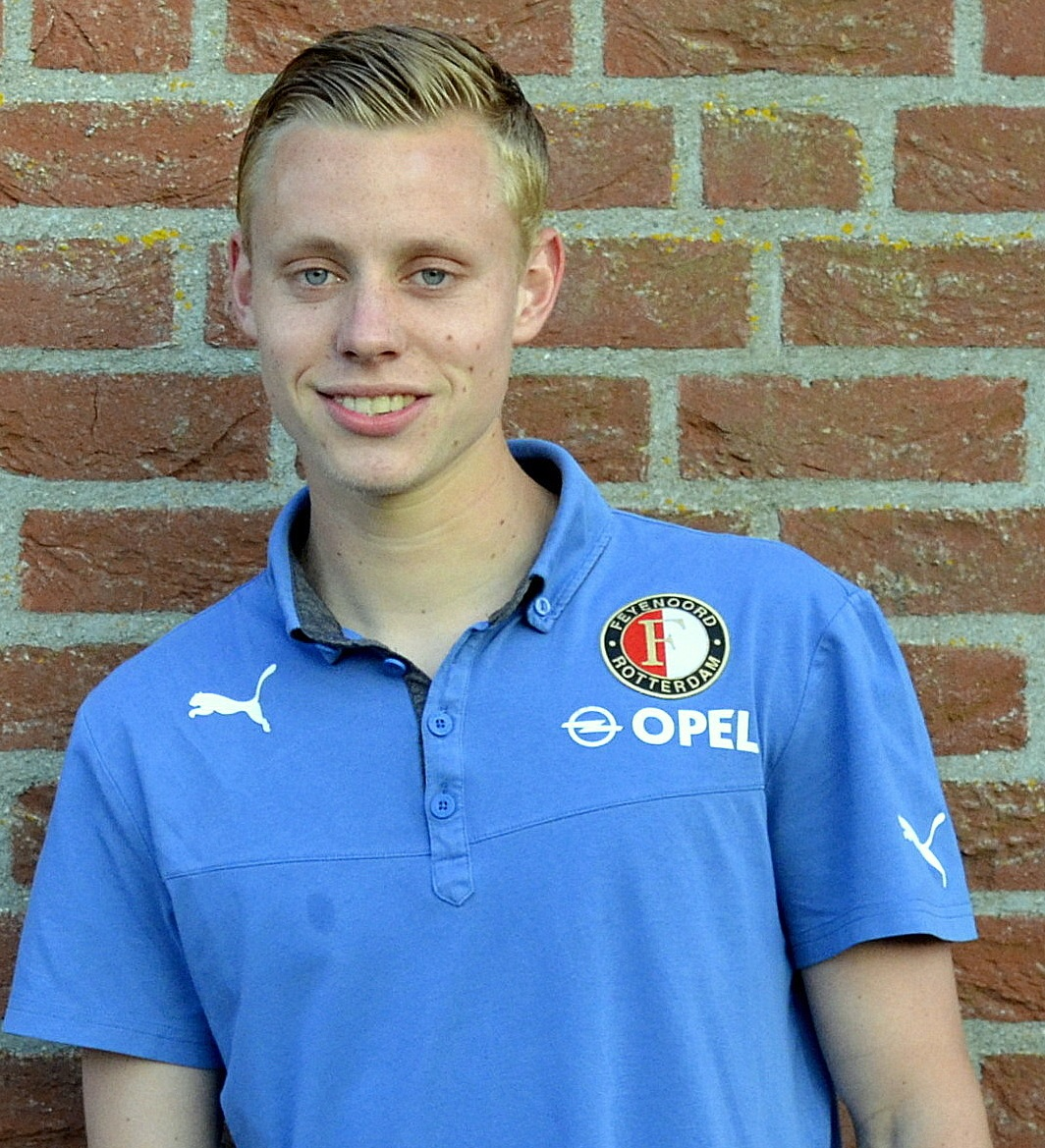
- Dekker with Feyenoord U19 in 2013

Personal information
- Date of birth: 15 March 1995 (age 31)
- Place of birth: Lekkerkerk, Netherlands
- Height: 1.73 m (5 ft 8 in)
- Position: Defensive midfielder

Team information
- Current team: DVS '33
- Number: 6

Youth career
- VV Lekkerkerk
- Feyenoord

Senior career*
Years	Team	Apps	(Gls)
2014–2020	PEC Zwolle	91	(2)
2020–2022	De Graafschap	44	(1)
2022–2024	TOP Oss	27	(2)
2024–	DVS '33	34	(2)
- * Club domestic league appearances and goals as of 11 January 2026

Rick Dekker (born 15 March 1995) is a Dutch professional footballer who plays as a midfielder for Derde Divisie club DVS '33.

== Club career ==
On 30 July 2020, after six years with PEC Zwolle, Dekker joined De Graafschap on a two-year deal with option of a further year.

Dekker joined TOP Oss on 20 June 2022. He made his debut for the club on 5 August, the opening matchday of the 2022–23 Eerste Divisie season, starting in a 3–0 win over Jong Utrecht. On 6 January 2023, he scored his first goal for TOP, slotting home the winner in the 88th minute of a 2–1 home win over Telstar.

On 12 July 2024, Dekker joined DVS '33 for one season.

== International career ==
In 2013, Dekker made the bench three times for Netherlands U19s during their 2014 UEFA European Under-19 Championship qualifying round campaign.

== Honours ==
PEC Zwolle

- Johan Cruyff Shield: 2014
