= Bram van Polen =

Dutch footballer

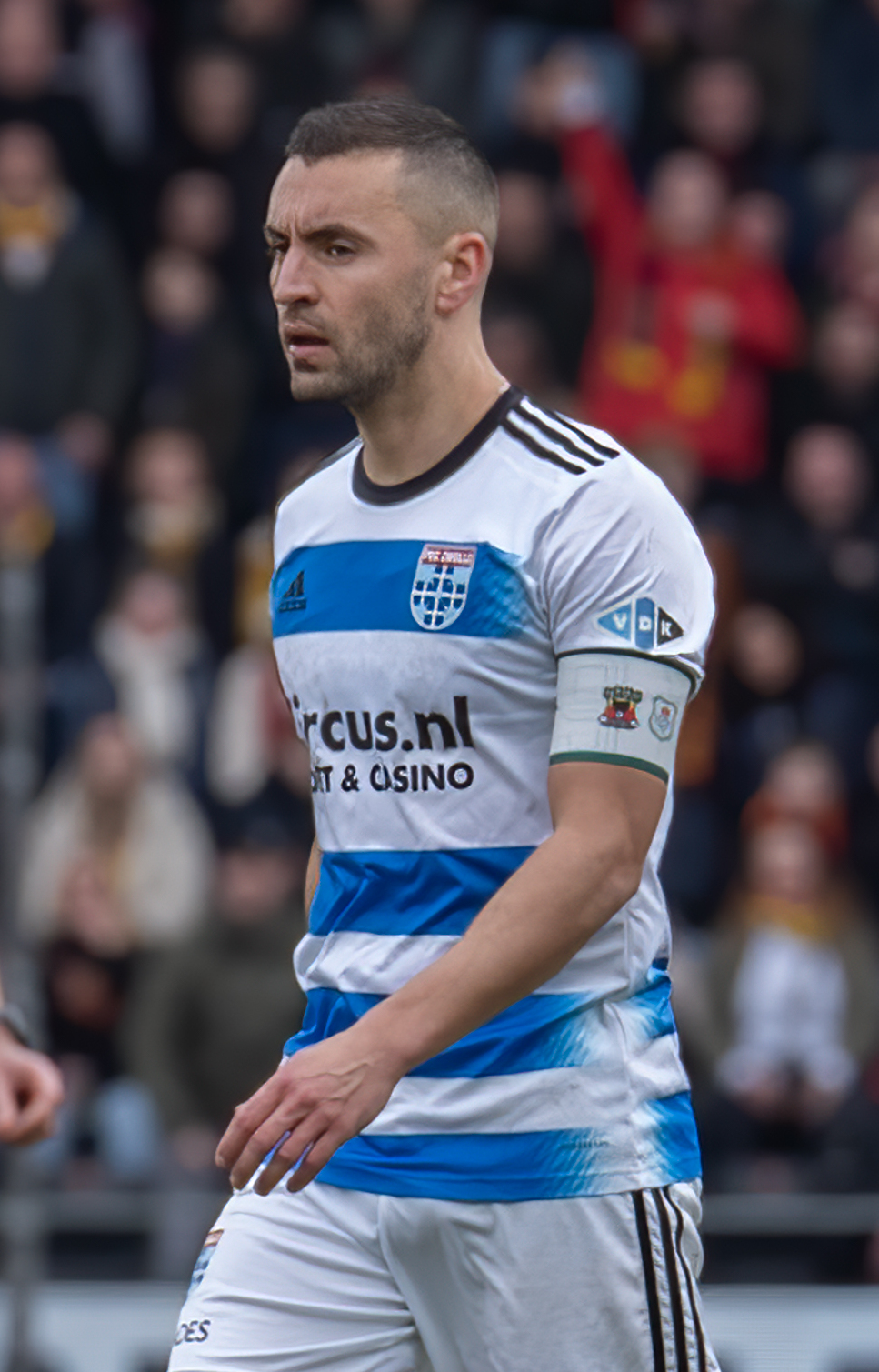
- Van Polen in 2024 with PEC Zwolle

Personal information
- Date of birth: 11 October 1985 (age 41)
- Place of birth: Nijkerk, Netherlands
- Height: 1.79 m (5 ft 10 in)
- Positions: Right-back; centre-back

Youth career
- VVOG
- Vitesse

Senior career*
Years	Team	Apps	(Gls)
2007–2024	PEC Zwolle	454	(34)
- * Club domestic league appearances and goals

Bram van Polen (Dutch pronunciation: [ˈbrɑm vɑm ˈpoːlə(n)]; (Note: Van in isolation: [vɑn].) born 11 October 1985) is a Dutch former professional footballer who played as a right-back or centre-back. A product of the Vitesse Arnhem youth academy, where he never played an official match, he played 16 seasons for PEC Zwolle, retiring in May 2024 after having been a club icon for years.

== Honours ==
PEC Zwolle

- KNVB Cup: 2013–14
- Johan Cruijff Shield: 2014
- Eerste Divisie: 2011–12
