= Stanley Elbers =

Dutch footballer

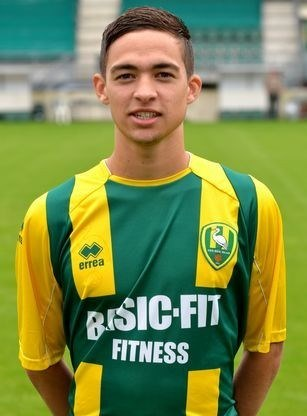

Personal information
- Full name: Stanley Ronny Willem Elbers
- Date of birth: 14 May 1992 (age 34)
- Place of birth: Leiden, Netherlands
- Height: 1.73 m (5 ft 8 in)
- Position: Winger

Youth career
- RKSV DoCoS
- –2009: UVS Leiden
- 2009–2011: ADO Den Haag

Senior career*
Years	Team	Apps	(Gls)
2011–2013	ADO Den Haag	20	(0)
2013–2015	Helmond Sport	67	(18)
2015–2018	Excelsior	72	(11)
2018–2020	PEC Zwolle	25	(1)
2019–2020	→ RKC Waalwijk (loan)	12	(1)
2020–2022	Hermannstadt	6	(0)

International career
2013	Netherlands U20	1	(0)
- * Club domestic league appearances and goals as of 9 June 2021

Stanley Elbers (born 14 May 1992) is a Dutch retired footballer who played as a winger.

== Club career ==
Elbers made his professional for ADO Den Haag on 28 August 2011 and joined Helmond Sport in summer 2013. He signed a three-year contract with Excelsior in 2015.

On 14 August 2018, he joined PEC Zwolle on a two-year contract.

== International career ==
Elbers once played for the Netherlands national under-20 football team.

== Personal life ==
Born in the Netherlands, Elbers is of Surinamese descent. He retired from playing football in 2022 and moved to Indonesia to live on Bali, citing he was fed up with the footballing world.
