= Rico Strieder =

German football (born 1992)

Personal information
- Date of birth: 6 July 1992 (age 34)
- Place of birth: Dachau, Germany
- Height: 1.74 m (5 ft 9 in)
- Position: Midfielder

Youth career
- TSV Arnbach
- 2003–2011: Bayern Munich

Senior career*
Years	Team	Apps	(Gls)
2011–2015	Bayern Munich II	93	(3)
2015	Bayern Munich	1	(0)
2015–2020	FC Utrecht	87	(3)
2017	Jong FC Utrecht	1	(0)
2020	→ PEC Zwolle (loan)	6	(0)
2020–2022	PEC Zwolle	48	(0)
2022–2023	SV Heimstetten	6	(0)
- * Club domestic league appearances and goals as of 19:12, 19 July 2023 (UTC)

Rico Strieder (born 6 July 1992) is a German professional footballer who plays as a midfielder.

== Club career ==
Strieder is a youth product of the Bayern Munich academy. On 2 May 2015, he made his debut for first-team in away match against Bayer Leverkusen.

On 10 July 2015, Strieder transferred to Utrecht.

== Personal life ==
Strieder was born in Dachau, Bavaria.

== Career statistics ==
As of match played 24 May 2019

Appearances and goals by club, season and competition
Club	Season	League			Cup		Continental		Other		Total	
Club	Season	Division	Apps	Goals	Apps	Goals	Apps	Goals	Apps	Goals	Apps	Goals
Bayern Munich II	2011–12	Regionalliga Süd	23	0	—		—		—		23	0
Bayern Munich II	2012–13	Regionalliga Bayern	29	2	—		—		—		29	2
Bayern Munich II	2013–14	Regionalliga Bayern	33	1	—		—		1 (Note: Appearance in the 2014 Regionalliga promotion play-offs)	0	34	1
Bayern Munich II	2014–15	Regionalliga Bayern	8	0	—		—		—		8	0
Bayern Munich II	2015–16	Regionalliga Bayern	0	0	—		—		—		0	0
Bayern Munich II	Total		93	3	0	0	0	0	1	0	93	3
Bayern Munich	2014–15	Bundesliga	1	0	0	0	—		—		1	0
Utrecht	2015–16	Eredivisie	32	2	6	0	—		4 (Note: Appearances in the 2016 Eredivisie European play-offs)	1	42	3
Utrecht	2016–17	Eredivisie	16	1	2	0	—		—		18	1
Utrecht	2017–18	Eredivisie	28	1	1	0	—		3 (Note: Appearances in the 2018 Eredivisie European play-offs)	0	32	1
Utrecht	2018–19	Eredivisie	6	0	0	0	—		3 (Note: Appearances in the 2019 Eredivisie European play-offs)	0	9	0
Utrecht	Total		82	4	9	0	0	0	10	1	101	5
Jong Utrecht	2017–18	Eerste Divisie	1	0	—		—		—		1	0
Career total			177	7	9	0	0	0	11	1	197	8
