= Mustafa Saymak =

Dutch-Turkish footballer (born 1993)

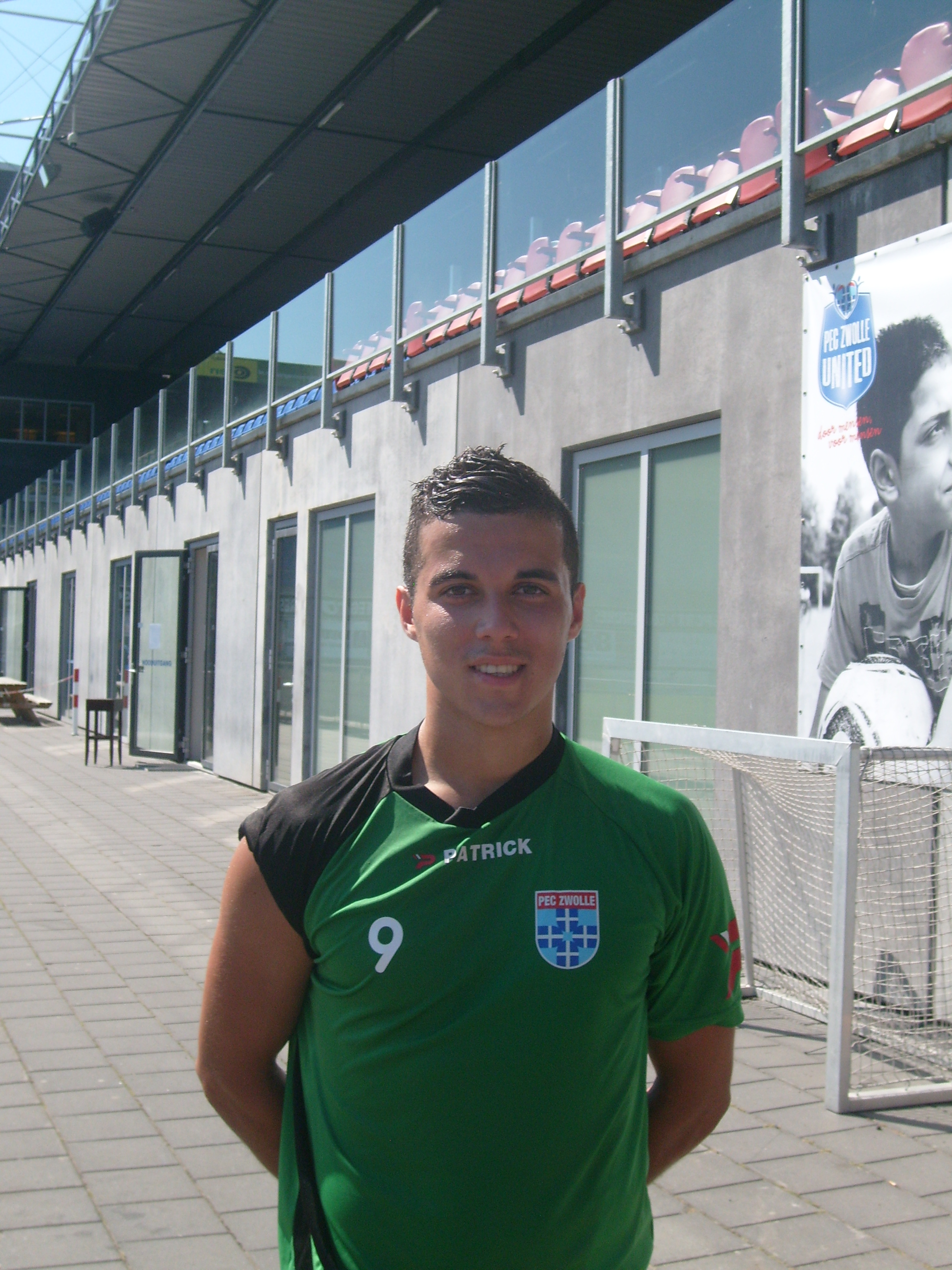

Personal information
- Date of birth: 11 February 1993 (age 33)
- Place of birth: Deventer, Netherlands
- Height: 1.69 m (5 ft 7 in)
- Positions: Winger; attacking midfielder

Team information
- Current team: Aliağa FK
- Number: 20

Youth career
- SV Schalkhaar
- FC Zwolle

Senior career*
Years	Team	Apps	(Gls)
2011–2018	PEC Zwolle	149	(29)
2018–2019	Çaykur Rizespor	15	(0)
2019–2022	PEC Zwolle	60	(6)
2022–2024	Bandırmaspor	16	(2)
2024–	Aliağa FK	3	(0)

International career
2011	Netherlands U19	2	(0)
2013	Turkey U20	2	(0)
2013	Netherlands U20	2	(0)
2014	Netherlands U21	1	(0)
- * Club domestic league appearances and goals as of 4 February 2024

Mustafa Saymak (born 11 February 1993) is a professional footballer who plays as a winger for Turkish TFF 2. Lig club Aliağa FK. Born in the Netherlands, he has represented both Turkey and the Netherlands at various international youth levels.

== Club career ==
=== PEC Zwolle ===
==== 2011–12 season ====
Saymak made his league debut for PEC (then named FC Zwolle) when they were still playing in the second tier of Dutch league football, the Jupiler League. The game was played on 5 August 2011 and was an away game against FC Den Bosch. Saymak came on as a substitute in the 87th minute, as the game ended in a 2–2 draw. His first league goal came on 12 September 2011, in an away game against Helmond Sport. However, it turned out to be the only goal in a 3–1 defeat for PEC. Saymak's progress was rewarded with his first league start 4 days later, at home against FC Volendam. Saymak completed the full 90 minutes, as PEC won the game 3–1. Saymak completed his first brace of his career, in a 5–0 home win over FC Dordrecht.

Saymak was unable to clinch a definite place in PEC's starting line-up, but was seen as one of the squad's most exciting prospects for the future, as PEC won promotion to the 2012–13 Eredivisie by winning the league. Saymak finished the season with 3 goals in 17 league games and 5 league starts.

==== 2012–13 season ====
Saymak made most of his league appearances in the 2012–13 season as a sub, as PEC secured safety from relegation surprisingly easy. Similarly to the previous season, Saymak finished with 17 league games and 5 league starts, in which he scored 1 goal.

==== 2013–14 season ====
The 2013–14 season was Mustafa's breakthrough season. With the departure of Youness Mokhtar (FC Twente) and Denni Avdic (AZ), Saymak took the opportunity to clinch a place on the wing in PEC's starting line-up. Saymak started the first 10 league games of the season, with assists against Heracles Almelo (1), Ajax (1) and ADO Den Haag (1), with also scoring a brace in the latter, as PEC was riding high in 3rd place after 10 league games. The game against ADO Den Haag (6–1 home win) also saw Saymak play in a different role than usual, being used as an attacking midfielder, as opposed to his usual role as a winger.

His run of games ended as he missed the home game against AZ with an ankle injury and the third round cup-game for the KNVB Beker against Wilhelmina '08, but he was re-instated in the starting line-up in the following game against PSV. Saymak had a significant role in a rampant PEC, that drew praise for their excellent passing game and attacking play.

PEC also reached unprecedented heights in the cup, as the club from Zwolle surprisingly reached the final of the KNVB Beker, against league champions Ajax. The biggest surprise was yet to come, as Saymak started for PEC in a dominating 5–1 win, securing European football for the first time in the club's history and more importantly, securing the club's first major trophy. Saymak finished the season with 30 league appearances, including 29 league starts, in which he scored 6 league goals and was responsible for 6 league assists.

==== 2014–15 season ====
Saymak started the season on a positive note, as PEC defeated Ajax 1–0 to win the 2014 Johan Cruijff Schaal. Saymak started the game and completed the full 90 minutes.

Saymak scored his first league goal of the season on 16 August 2014, by scoring an injury-time winner in the away game against FC Dordrecht.

=== Bandırmaspor ===
On 13 June 2022, Saymak returned to Turkey and signed a two-year contract with Bandırmaspor.

== International career ==
Saymak was born in the Netherlands to parents of Turkish descent. He originally played for various Dutch youth teams. In February 2013, Saymak was called up to the Turkish under-20 team for the a match against Uzbekistan. He has since been called up and capped by the Netherlands U21 team.

== Honours ==
PEC Zwolle

- KNVB Cup: 2013–14
- Johan Cruijff Shield: 2014
- Eerste Divisie: 2011–12
