= MAC3PARK Stadion =

Football stadium in Zwolle, Netherlands

Coordinates: 52°31′2″N 6°7′15″E

MAC^{3}PARK Stadion
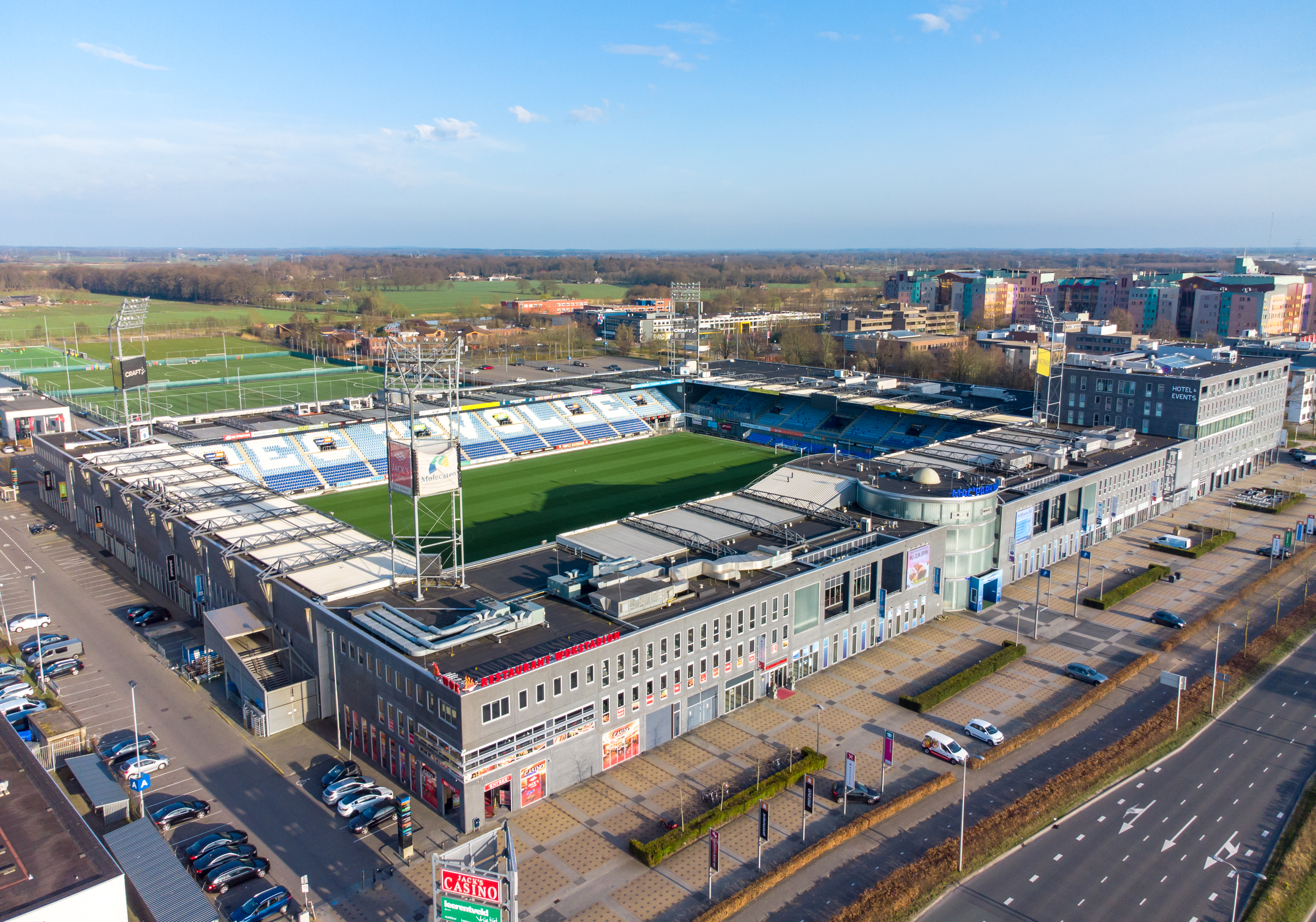
- Interactive map of MAC^{3}PARK Stadion
- Former names: FC Zwolle Stadion (2007–2012); IJsseldelta Stadion (2012–2016)
- Location: Zwolle, Netherlands
- Capacity: 14,000

Construction
- Groundbreaking: 9 March 2007
- Opened: 29 August 2009
- Architects: Widdershoven architect, Kerkrade

Tenant
- PEC Zwolle

MAC^{3}PARK Stadion (Dutch pronunciation: [mɛɡˈdripɑr(ə)k ˌstaːdijɔn]) is a multi-use stadium in Zwolle, Netherlands. It is used mostly for football matches and hosts the home matches of PEC Zwolle. The stadium has an official capacity of 14,000. The stadium replaced Oosterenkstadion as the home of PEC Zwolle. In European competitions, the stadium is known as PEC Zwolle Stadion due to advertising rules.

On 12 July 2012 PEC Zwolle announced the new name for their home ground, IJsseldelta Stadion. The current name, MAC^{3}PARK Stadion, was unveiled in November 2015 and officially adopted on 1 July 2016.

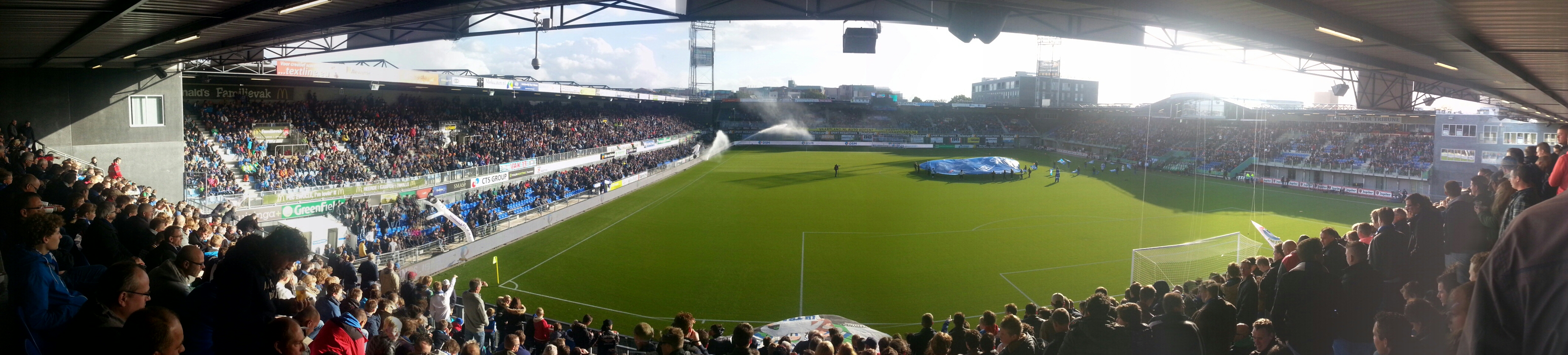

== See also ==
- List of football stadiums in the Netherlands
- Lists of stadiums
