= Jarni Koorman =

Dutch footballer

Personal information
- Date of birth: 15 March 1999 (age 27)
- Place of birth: Zwolle, Netherlands
- Height: 1.80 m (5 ft 11 in)
- Position: Midfielder

Youth career
- Be Quick '28
- 2016–2019: Twente

Senior career*
Years	Team	Apps	(Gls)
2017–2018	Jong Twente	8	(2)
2019–2020	PEC Zwolle	3	(0)
2020–2021	TOP Oss	15	(1)
2022–2024	Go-Ahead Kampen		
- * Club domestic league appearances and goals as of 17 September 2021

Jarni Koorman (born 15 March 1999) is a Dutch professional footballer who plays as a midfielder.

== Career ==
Born in Zwolle, Koorman started playing in the youth department of Be Quick '28. He then joined local Eredivisie side FC Twente in 2016, where he progressed through the youth system until reaching to the reserves, Jong FC Twente. In the summer of 2018, Koorman moved to PEC Zwolle, where he signed a two-year contract. On 1 February 2020, he made his debut for the club in a match against Groningen.

On 11 September 2020, Koorman signed a two-year contract with TOP Oss, after rumours had linked him to Go Ahead Eagles and SpVgg Greuther Fürth. He made his debut for the club on 15 September in a 3–0 away loss to Almere City.

== Personal life ==
Jarni Koorman is the son of former professional footballer, Marco Koorman, who played for Groningen and PEC Zwolle.
