= 2021–22 PEC Zwolle season =

PEC Zwolle
2021–22 season
- Chairman: Adriaan Visser
- Manager: Dick Schreuder
- Stadium: MAC³PARK Stadion
- Eredivisie: 18th (relegated)
- KNVB Cup: Round of 16
- Top goalscorer: League: Daishawn Redan (5); All: Daishawn Redan (5)

The 2021–22 season was the 55th season in the existence of PEC Zwolle and the club's 24th consecutive season in the top flight of Dutch football. In addition to the domestic league, PEC Zwolle participated in this season's editions of the KNVB Cup.

On 11 May, PEC Zwolle descended to the second division for the first time since the 2011–12 season.

== Players ==
=== First-team squad ===
As of 14 February 2022

Note: Flags indicate national team as defined under FIFA eligibility rules; some limited exceptions apply. Players may hold more than one non-FIFA nationality.

No.	Pos.	Nation	Player
1	GK	GRE	Kostas Lamprou
2	DF	NED	Bram van Polen (captain)
3	DF	BEL	Siemen Voet
4	DF	JPN	Yuta Nakayama
5	DF	NED	Kenneth Paal
6	MF	NED	Mustafa Saymak
7	FW	CUW	Gervane Kastaneer
8	MF	NED	Dean Huiberts
9	FW	SRB	Slobodan Tedić (on loan from Manchester City)
10	MF	NED	Pelle Clement
9	FW	SRB	Luka Adžić
13	MF	GER	Rico Strieder
15	DF	NED	Sam Kersten
16	GK	NED	Jasper Schendelaar
18	MF	NED	Gabi Caschili
19	FW	NED	Daishawn Redan (on loan from Hertha BSC)

No.	Pos.	Nation	Player
20	MF	NED	Thomas van den Belt
21	DF	NED	Djavan Anderson (on loan from Lazio)
22	FW	NED	Max de Waal (on loan from Ajax)
23	FW	NED	Eliano Reijnders
29	FW	ALG	Oussama Darfalou (on loan from Vitesse)
30	DF	NED	Maikel van der Werff
31	DF	JPN	Sai van Wermeskerken
33	DF	NED	Rav van den Berg
34	DF	NED	Mees de Wit
37	MF	SUR	Ryan Koolwijk
40	GK	NED	Mike Hauptmeijer
47	FW	NED	Jarno Westerman
63	FW	NED	Chardi Landu
-	DF	NED	Daijiro Chirino
-	FW	NED	Samir Lagsir

== Pre-season and friendlies ==
Win Draw Loss Fixtures

3 July 2021 Friendly	FC St. Pauli (Germany)	Cancelled	(Netherlands) PEC Zwolle	Germany
15:00 CEST (UTC+2)

8 July 2021 Friendly	PEC Zwolle (Netherlands)	0–2	(Netherlands) FC Volendam	Zwolle, Netherlands
14:00 CEST (UTC+2)

24 July 2021 Friendly	PEC Zwolle (Netherlands)	2–1	(Netherlands) SC Cambuur	Germany
14:30 CEST (UTC+2)

28 July 2021 Friendly	Fenerbahçe (Turkey)	2–2	(Netherlands) PEC Zwolle	Istanbul, Turkey
19:00 TRT (UTC+3)	Zajc (yellow card) 38'; Tisserand 45'; Valencia 48'		Bajselmani (yellow card) 44'; Saymak 68'; Landu 81'	Stadium: Atatürk Olympic Stadium; Referee: Onur Özütoprak

31 July 2021 Friendly	PEC Zwolle (Netherlands)	0–2	(Netherlands) SC Heerenveen	Zwolle, Netherlands
18:45 CEST (UTC+2)			J. Veerman 7'; De Jong 84'	Stadium: MAC³PARK Stadion

7 August 2021 Friendly	Heracles Almelo (Netherlands)	3–1	(Netherlands) PEC Zwolle	Germany
16:00 CEST (UTC+2)

== Competitions ==
=== Overall record ===
Competition	First match	Last match	Starting round	Record							
Competition	First match	Last match	Starting round	Pld	W	D	L	GF	GA	GD	Win %
Eredivisie	15 August 2021	15 May 2021	Matchday 1	33	7	6	20	25	50	−25	21.21
KNVB Cup	14–16 December 2021	19 January 2022	First round	3	2	0	1	9	3	+6	66.67
Total				36	9	6	21	34	53	−19	25.00

Last updated: 11 May 2022
Source: Soccerway

=== Eredivisie ===
==== League table ====
Pos	Team	Pld	W	D	L	GF	GA	GD	Pts	Qualification or relegation
14	Sparta Rotterdam	34	8	11	15	30	48	−18	35	
15	Fortuna Sittard	34	10	5	19	36	67	−31	35	
16	Heracles Almelo (R)	34	9	7	18	33	49	−16	34	Qualification for the Relegation play-offs
17	Willem II (R)	34	9	6	19	32	57	−25	33	Relegation to Eerste Divisie
18	PEC Zwolle (R)	34	7	6	21	26	52	−26	27	Relegation to Eerste Divisie

Source: Eredivisie
Rules for classification: Season in progress: 1) Most points won; 2) Less points lost; 3) Goal difference; 4) Goals scored; 5) Alphabetical order; End of season: 1) Points; 2) Goal difference; 3) Goals scored; 4) Head-to-head points; 5) Head-to-head goal difference; 6) Head-to-head away goals scored; 7) Play-off if relevant for deciding champion, relegation or participating in a European league, otherwise by draw. 8) Penalty shoot-out (only after a play-off)
(R) Relegated

==== Results summary ====
Overall								Home						Away					
Pld	W	D	L	GF	GA	GD	Pts	W	D	L	GF	GA	GD	W	D	L	GF	GA	GD
29	6	5	18	22	44	−22	23	3	4	8	11	17	−6	3	1	10	11	27	−16

Last updated: 11 April 2022.
Source: Eredivisie

==== Results by round ====
Round	1	2	3	4	5	6	7	8	9	10	11	12	13	14	15	16	17	18	19	20	21	22	23	24	25	26	27	28	29	30	31	32	33	34
Ground	H	A	A	H	A	H	A	H	A	H	A	H	A	H	A	H	H	A	H	A	H	A	H	A	A	H	A	H	H	A	A	H	A	H
Result	L	L	L	L	L	D	L	L	L	W	L	L	L	D	D	L	L	L	W	W	D	W	D	L	W	L	L	L	W	W	L			
Position	12	17	18	18	18	18	18	18	18	18	18	18	18	18	18	18	18	18	18	18	18	18	18	18	18	18	18	18	16					

Updated to match(es) played on 13 March 2022. Source: Eredivisie
A = Away; H = Home; W = Win; D = Draw; L = Loss

==== Matches ====
The league fixtures were announced on 11 June 2021.

15 August 2021 1	PEC Zwolle	0–1	Vitesse	Zwolle
14:30 CEST (UTC+2)		Report	Frederiksen 20'; Bero (yellow card) 31'; Buitink (yellow card) 72'	Stadium: MAC³PARK Stadion; Attendance: 9,000; Referee: Richard Martens

20 August 2021 2	N.E.C.	2–0	PEC Zwolle	Nijmegen
20:00 CEST (UTC+2)	Akman 3'; Duelund (yellow card) 18'; Okita (yellow card) 36', (goal) 41'; van Rooij (yellow card) 53'; El Karouani (yellow card) 73'	Report	Clement (yellow card) 53'; Reijnders (yellow card) 82'; van den Belt (yellow card) 85'; Kersten (red card) 88'	Stadium: De Goffert; Attendance: 8,333; Referee: Sander van der Eijk

28 August 2021 3	Willem II	1–0	PEC Zwolle	Tilburg
21:00 CEST (UTC+2)	Sağlam 53'	Report		Stadium: Koning Willem II Stadion; Attendance: 9,352; Referee: Ingmar Oostrom

11 September 2021 4	PEC Zwolle	0–2	Ajax	Zwolle
18:45 CEST (UTC+2)	Redan (yellow card) 49'	Report	Antony (yellow card) 26'; Haller 29', 67'; Gravenberch (yellow card) 51'; Mazraoui (yellow card) 78'	Stadium: MAC³PARK Stadion; Attendance: 9,000; Referee: Jeroen Manschot

19 September 2021 5	Go Ahead Eagles	1–0	PEC Zwolle	Deventer
12:15 CEST (UTC+2)	Kuipers (yellow card) 66'; Botos 77'	Report	Mbinga (yellow card) 29'; Kersten (yellow card) 49'	Stadium: De Adelaarshorst; Attendance: 6,000; Referee: Kevin Blom

22 September 2021 6	PEC Zwolle	1–1	Sparta Rotterdam	Zwolle
21:00 CEST (UTC+2)	Redan 8'; Huiberts (yellow card) 55'	Report	Van Crooij 1'; Smeets (yellow card) 81'; Goudmijn (yellow card) 88'	Stadium: MAC³PARK Stadion; Attendance: 9,000; Referee: Martin Perez

25 September 2021 7	FC Utrecht	5–1	PEC Zwolle	Utrecht
21:00 CEST (UTC+2)	Douvikas 11' (pen.); Sylla 59'; Ramselaar 65' (pen.); Mahi 66'; Janssen 86'	Report	Strieder (yellow card) 64'; Saymak 75'	Stadium: Stadion Galgenwaard; Attendance: 19,451; Referee: Allard Lindhout

2 October 2021 8	PEC Zwolle	0–1	sc Heerenveen	Zwolle
20:00 CEST (UTC+2)	Tedić (yellow card) 42'; Nakayama (yellow card) 45'	Report	Van der Heide (yellow card) 53'; Van Polen 63' (o.g.)	Stadium: MAC³PARK Stadion; Attendance: 13,655; Referee: Dennis Higler

16 October 2021 9	PSV	3–1	PEC Zwolle	Eindhoven
21:00 CEST (UTC+2)				Stadium: Philips Stadion

23 October 2021 10	PEC Zwolle	1–0	Heracles Almelo	Zwolle
20:00 CEST (UTC+2)				Stadium: MAC³PARK Stadion

30 October 2021 11	AZ Alkmaar	3–2	PEC Zwolle	Alkmaar
21:00 CET (UTC+1)				Stadium: AFAS Stadion

6 November 2021 12	PEC Zwolle	1–2	SC Cambuur	Zwolle
21:00 CET (UTC+1)				Stadium: MAC³PARK Stadion

21 November 2021 13	Feyenoord	4–0	PEC Zwolle	Rotterdam
14:30 CET (UTC+1)				Stadium: De Kuip

27 November 2021 14	PEC Zwolle	0–0	RKC Waalwijk	Zwolle
20:00 CET (UTC+1)				Stadium: MAC³PARK Stadion

3 December 2021 15	FC Groningen	1–1	PEC Zwolle	Groningen
20:00 CET (UTC+1)				Stadium: Euroborg

11 December 2021 16	PEC Zwolle	0–1	Fortuna Sittard	Zwolle
21:00 CET (UTC+1)				Stadium: MAC³PARK Stadion

18 December 2021 17	PEC Zwolle	1–3	FC Twente	Zwolle
21:00 CET (UTC+1)				Stadium: MAC³PARK Stadion

21 December 2021 18	Vitesse	1–0	PEC Zwolle	Arnhem
18:45 CET (UTC+1)				Stadium: GelreDome

14 January 2022 19	PEC Zwolle	2–0	Willem II	Zwolle
20:00 CET (UTC+1)				Stadium: MAC³PARK Stadion

22 January 2022 20	sc Heerenveen	0–1	PEC Zwolle	Heerenveen
20:00 CET (UTC+1)				Stadium: Abe Lenstra Stadion

5 February 2022 21	PEC Zwolle	1–1	N.E.C. Nijmegen	Zwolle
20:00 CET (UTC+1)				Stadium: MAC³PARK Stadion

12 February 2022 22	SC Cambuur	3–4	PEC Zwolle	Leeuwarden
18:45 CET (UTC+1)				Stadium: Cambuur Stadion

20 February 2022 23	PEC Zwolle	1–1	FC Groningen	Zwolle
12:15 CET (UTC+1)				Stadium: MAC³PARK Stadion

26 February 2022 24	Heracles Almelo	2–0	PEC Zwolle	Almelo
16:30 CET (UTC+1)	de la Torre 19'; Bakış 55'	Report		Stadium: Erve Asito; Attendance: 6,788; Referee: (Netherlands) Allard Lindhout

6 March 2022 25	Fortuna Sittard	0–1	PEC Zwolle	Sittard
20:00 CET (UTC+1)	Flemming (yellow card) 82'	Report	de Wit (yellow card) 42'; Darfalou 77'; Kastaneer (yellow card) 83'	Stadium: Fortuna Sittard Stadion; Attendance: 8,279; Referee: (Netherlands) Serdar Gözübüyük

13 March 2022 26	PEC Zwolle	1–2	Feyenoord	Zwolle
16:45 CET (UTC+1)	van den Belt (yellow card) 14'; van Polen 45+2'; van der Werff (yellow card) 71'; Nakayama (yellow card) 75'	Report	Kökçü (yellow card) 53'; Sinisterra 67'; Dessers 77'	Stadium: MAC³PARK Stadion; Attendance: 14,000; Referee: (Netherlands) Martin van den Kerkhof

19 March 2022 27	FC Twente	1–0	PEC Zwolle	Enschede
20:00 CET (UTC+1)	Rots 19'		van den Belt (yellow card) 46'; Paal (yellow card) 53'	Stadium: De Grolsch Veste; Referee: (Netherlands) Edwin van de Graaf

3 April 2022 28	PEC Zwolle	0–1	Go Ahead Eagles	Zwolle
12:15 CEST (UTC+2)			Rommens 90+3'	Stadium: MAC³PARK Stadion; Referee: (Netherlands) Danny Makkelie

10 April 2022 29	PEC Zwolle	2–1	AZ Alkmaar	Zwolle
20:00 CEST (UTC+2)	Kastaneer 51'; Redan 86'		Pavlidis 81'; Wijndal (yellow card) 89'	Stadium: MAC³PARK Stadion; Referee: (Netherlands) Allard Lindhout

23 April 2022 30	RKC Waalwijk	v	PEC Zwolle	Waalwijk
14:30 CEST (UTC+2)				Stadium: Mandemakers Stadion

30 April 2022 31	Ajax	v	PEC Zwolle	Amsterdam
14:30 CEST (UTC+2)				Stadium: Johan Cruijff ArenA

7 May 2022 32	PEC Zwolle	v	FC Utrecht	Zwolle
14:30 CEST (UTC+2)				Stadium: MAC³PARK Stadion

11 May 2022 33	Sparta Rotterdam	v	PEC Zwolle	Rotterdam
20:00 CEST (UTC+2)				Stadium: Het Kasteel

15 May 2022 34	PEC Zwolle	v	PSV Eindhoven	Zwolle
CEST (UTC+2)				Stadium: MAC³PARK Stadion

=== KNVB Cup ===
26 October 2021 First Round	PEC Zwolle	4–1	De Graafschap	Zwolle
20:00 CEST (UTC+2)	Strieder (yellow card) 32'; Nakayama 42'; Huiberts (yellow card) 45+1', (goal) 62'; Saymak 52'; Kastaneer (yellow card) 54'; Fernandes 90+2'	Report	Konings 82' (pen.)	Stadium: MAC³PARK Stadion; Referee: Pol van Boekel

14 December 2021 Second Round	PEC Zwolle	4–0	MVV	Zwolle
18:00 CET (UTC+1)	Voet 14'; Van den Berg 20'; Van den Belt (yellow card) 55'; Adžić 62'; Tedić 70'	Report	Aziz (yellow card) 79'	Stadium: MAC³PARK Stadion; Referee: Erwin Blank

19 January 2022 Round of 16	NAC Breda	2–1	PEC Zwolle	Breda
20:00 CET (UTC+1)	Bannis 13'; De Rooij 84'	Report	Saymak 5'; Voet (yellow card) 34'; Darfalou (yellow card) 40'; Redan (yellow card) 71'	Stadium: Rat Verlegh Stadion; Referee: Dennis Higler
