= Tristan van Gilst =

Dutch footballer (born 2003)

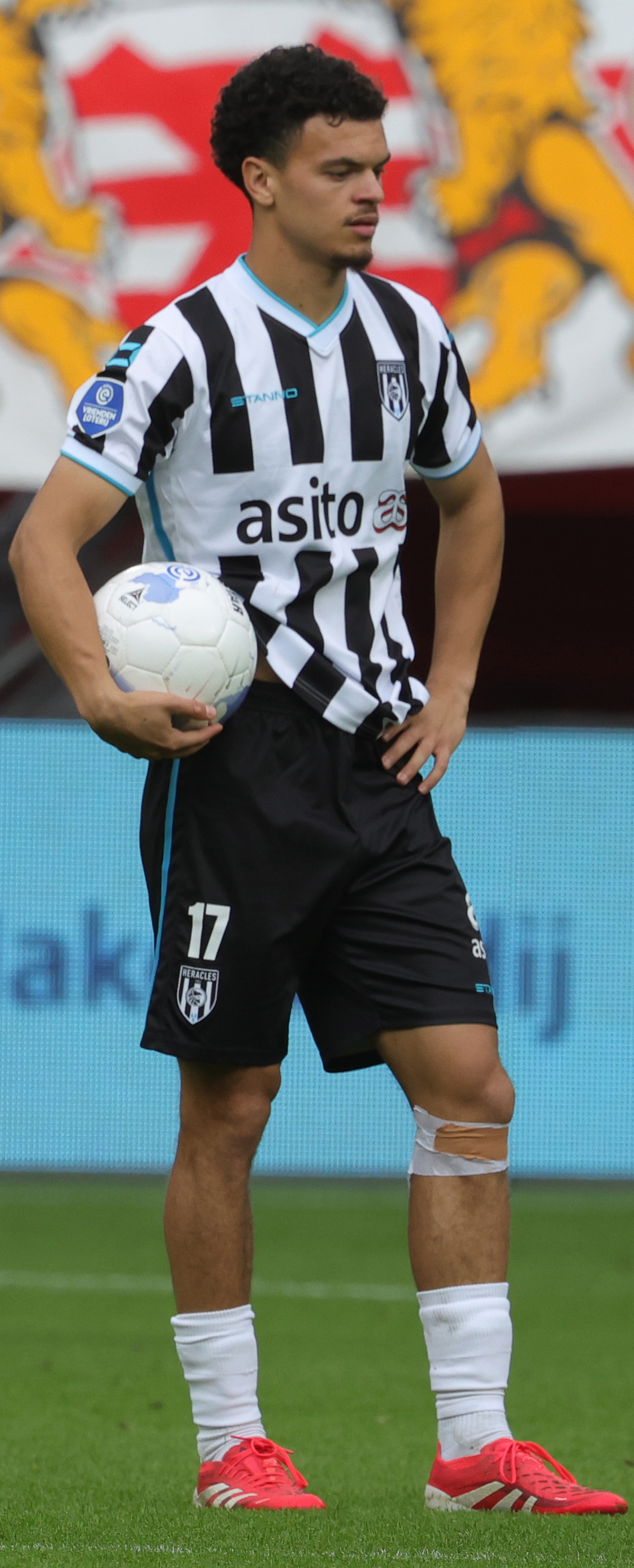

Personal information
- Date of birth: 18 February 2003 (age 23)
- Place of birth: Amsterdam, Netherlands
- Height: 1.78 m (5 ft 10 in)
- Position: Winger

Team information
- Current team: Heracles Almelo

Youth career
- FC Aalsmeer
- –2021: AFC
- 2021–2023: PEC Zwolle

Senior career*
Years	Team	Apps	(Gls)
2021–2023	PEC Zwolle	1	(0)
2023–2025	De Graafschap	59	(16)
2025–	Heracles Almelo	28	(2)
- * Club domestic league appearances and goals as of 10:37, 21 May 2026 (UTC)

Tristan van Gilst (born 18 February 2003) is a Dutch professional footballer who plays as a winger for Eerste Divisie club Heracles Almelo.

== Career ==
=== PEC Zwolle ===
Born in Amsterdam, Van Gilst started playing football for FC Aalsmeer before joining AFC's youth academy. In 2021, he signed with the under-21 team of PEC Zwolle.

On 30 April 2022, Van Gilst made his professional debut for PEC's first-team, replacing Chardi Landu in the 69th minute of a 3–0 away loss against Ajax in the Eredivisie. He signed his first professional contract at the end of the season; a one-year deal with an option for an additional season. This remained his only first-team appearance for the club, as he would mainly appear for the under-21s the following season, scoring nine goals and assisting five in 23 appearances.

=== De Graafschap ===
On 30 June 2023, Van Gilst signed a one-year contract with an option for an additional season with Eerste Divisie club De Graafschap. His debut for the club was delayed as he suffered a knee injury during training in late July 2023, sidelining him for several months. On 29 September 2023, he eventually made his debut for the Superboeren, replacing Başar Önal in the 81st minute of a 0–0 league draw against Roda JC. He made his first ever start on 20 October, replacing David Flakus Bosilj in attack, after the latter had recently returned from international duty. He played 68 minutes in a 2–1 victory over Groningen that day.

On 22 January 2024, Van Gilst scored his first professional goals—a brace—contributing to a 4–2 win over Jong PSV.

=== Heracles Almelo ===
On 30 April 2025, Van Gilst agreed to join Eredivisie club Heracles Almelo on a free transfer from De Graafschap, signing a three-year contract effective from the 2025–26 season.

== Career statistics ==
As of match played 20 December 2025

Appearances and goals by club, season and competition
Club	Season	League			KNVB Cup		Other		Total	
Club	Season	Division	Apps	Goals	Apps	Goals	Apps	Goals	Apps	Goals
PEC Zwolle	2021–22	Eredivisie	1	0	0	0	—		1	0
PEC Zwolle	2022–23	Eerste Divisie	0	0	0	0	—		0	0
PEC Zwolle	Total		1	0	0	0	—		1	0
De Graafschap	2023–24	Eerste Divisie	28	5	2	0	1 (Note: Appearance(s) in Eredivisie play-offs)	0	31	5
De Graafschap	2024–25	Eerste Divisie	31	11	2	1	2	0	35	12
De Graafschap	Total		59	16	4	1	3	0	66	17
Heracles Almelo	2025–26	Eredivisie	13	0	1	1	—		14	1
Career total			73	16	5	2	3	0	81	18
