= 2022–23 PEC Zwolle season =

PEC Zwolle
2022–23 season
- Chairman: Erik van der Ham
- Manager: Dick Schreuder
- Stadium: MAC³PARK Stadion
- Eerste Divisie: 2nd (promoted)
- KNVB Cup: Second round
- Top goalscorer: League: Lennart Thy (23); All: Lennart Thy (23)
- Biggest win: PEC Zwolle 13–0 Den Bosch
- Biggest defeat: Dordrecht 3–0 PEC Zwolle

The 2022–23 season was the 113th season in the history of PEC Zwolle and their first season back in the second division of Dutch football. The club participated in the Eerste Divisie and the KNVB Cup. The season covered the period from 1 July 2022 to 30 June 2023.

== Players ==
As of 8 March 2023

Note: Flags indicate national team as defined under FIFA eligibility rules; some limited exceptions apply. Players may hold more than one non-FIFA nationality.

No.	Pos.	Nation	Player
1	GK	NED	Jasper Schendelaar
2	DF	NED	Bram van Polen (captain)
3	DF	GER	Luis Görlich
4	MF	BIH	Haris Medunjanin
5	DF	NED	Bart van Hintum
6	MF	NED	Thomas van den Belt
7	FW	CUW	Gervane Kastaneer
8	MF	NED	Dean Huiberts
9	FW	GER	Lennart Thy
10	MF	CRO	Tomislav Mrkonjić
11	MF	NED	Davy van den Berg
14	FW	GRE	Apostolos Vellios
15	DF	NED	Sam Kersten
17	MF	NED	Dean Guezen
18	DF	NED	Jordy Tutuarima
19	MF	NED	Gabi Caschili
20	MF	MAR	Younes Taha

No.	Pos.	Nation	Player
21	MF	NED	Samir Lagsir
22	DF	NED	Daijiro Chirino
23	FW	NED	Hicham Acheffay
24	DF	NED	Melayro Bogarde (on loan from 1899 Hoffenheim)
25	MF	NED	Jimmy Kaparos
27	DF	NED	Jesse Vermaning
30	MF	NZL	Ryan Thomas
31	MF	NED	Sven Zitman
33	DF	NED	Rav van den Berg
34	FW	NED	Joshua Sion
36	MF	NED	Thomas Beelen
37	FW	NED	Tristan van Gilst
40	GK	NED	Mike Hauptmeijer
41	GK	NED	Duke Verduin
45	FW	NED	Chardi Landu
47	DF	NOR	Håkon Gangstad
—	MF	USA	Anthony Fontana

=== Out on loan ===
Note: Flags indicate national team as defined under FIFA eligibility rules; some limited exceptions apply. Players may hold more than one non-FIFA nationality.

No. / Pos. / Nation / Player; — / FW / NED / Stijn Meijer (at SC Verl until 30 June 2023)	No. / Pos. / Nation / Player; — / FW / NED / Eliano Reijnders (at Jong Utrecht until 30 June 2023)

== Pre-season and friendlies ==
Win Draw Loss Fixtures

8 July 2022 Friendly	PEC Zwolle (Netherlands)	0–0	(Netherlands) Emmen	Zwolle
19:30 CEST (UTC+2)				Stadium: MAC³PARK Stadion

12 July 2022 Friendly	PEC Zwolle (Netherlands)	7–3	(Netherlands) RKC Waalwijk	Epe
14:30 CEST (UTC+2)				Stadium: Sportpark De Wachtelenberg

15 July 2022 Friendly	PEC Zwolle (Netherlands)	0–1	(Netherlands) Heerenveen	Zwolle
18:30 CEST (UTC+2)	Van Hintum (yellow card)		Sarr 54'; Bochniewicz (yellow card)	Stadium: MAC³PARK Stadion; Attendance: 3,800; Referee: Timmer
Note: Match was played in two 37.5-minute halves.

15 July 2022 Friendly	PEC Zwolle (Netherlands)	0–1	(Netherlands) Heerenveen	Zwolle
--:-- CEST (UTC+2)			Kaib 38'; Nunumete (yellow card)	Stadium: MAC³PARK Stadion; Attendance: 3,800; Referee: Timmer
Note: Match was one period of 60 minutes.

26 September 2022 Friendly	PEC Zwolle (Netherlands)	5–0	Suriname	Zwolle
15:00 CEST (UTC+2)	Landu 56', 60'; Reemnet 70', 86'; Guezen 81'			Attendance: 0

3 December 2022 Friendly	PEC Zwolle (Netherlands)	0–1	(Belgium) Oostende	San Pedro del Pinatar, Spain
12:00 CEST (UTC+2)		Report	Bätzner 30'	Stadium: Pinatar Campo 2 Referee: Franco (Spain)

7 December 2022 Friendly	VfL Bochum (Germany)	1–3	(Netherlands) PEC Zwolle	Bochum, Germany
14:00 CET (UTC+1)	Holtmann 8'		van Polen 21' (pen.); Lagsir 37'; Thy 69'

== Competitions ==
=== Overall record ===
Competition	First match	Last match	Starting round	Final position	Record							
Competition	First match	Last match	Starting round	Final position	Pld	W	D	L	GF	GA	GD	Win %
Eerste Divisie	7 August 2022	19 May 2023	Matchday 1	2nd	38	27	4	7	99	43	+56	71.05
KNVB Cup	20 October 2022	12 January 2023	First round	Second round	2	1	0	1	2	3	−1	50.00
Total					40	28	4	8	101	46	+55	70.00

Source: Soccerway

=== Eerste Divisie ===
==== League table ====
Pos	Team	Pld	W	D	L	GF	GA	GD	Pts	Promotion or qualification
1	Heracles Almelo (Note: Winner of the First and Fourth Period (Rounds 1–10 and 29–38)) (C, P)	38	27	4	7	103	42	+61	85	Promotion to the Eredivisie
2	PEC Zwolle (Note: Winner of the Second Period (Rounds 11–19)) (P)	38	27	4	7	99	43	+56	85	Promotion to the Eredivisie
3	Almere City (Note: Winner of the Third Period (Rounds 20–28)) (O, P)	38	21	7	10	58	41	+17	70	Qualification for promotion play-offs
4	Willem II	38	19	11	8	68	40	+28	68	Qualification for promotion play-offs
5	MVV Maastricht	38	18	5	15	65	65	0	59	Qualification for promotion play-offs

Source: Soccerway, Keuken Kampioen Divisie (in Dutch)
Rules for classification: Season in progress: 1) Most points won; 2) Less points lost; 3) Goal difference; 4) Goals scored; 5) Alphabetical order; End of season: 1) Points; 2) Goal difference; 3) Goals scored; 4) Head-to-head points; 5) Head-to-head goal difference; 6) Head-to-head away goals scored; 7) Play-off if relevant for deciding champion, relegation or participating in a European league, otherwise by draw. 8) Penalty shoot-out (only after a play-off)
(C) Champions; (O) Play-off winners; (P) Promoted

==== Results summary ====
Overall								Home						Away					
Pld	W	D	L	GF	GA	GD	Pts	W	D	L	GF	GA	GD	W	D	L	GF	GA	GD
38	27	4	7	99	43	+56	85	15	2	2	58	18	+40	12	2	5	41	25	+16

Source: Keuken Kampioen Divisie

==== Results by round ====
Round	1	2	3	4	5	6	7	8	9	10	11	12	13	14	15	16	17	18	19	20	21	22	23	24	25	26	27	28	29	30	31	32	33	34	35	36	37	38
Ground	H	A	A	H	A	H	H	A	H	A	H	A	H	A	H	A	H	A	H	A	H	H	A	H	A	A	H	A	H	A	H	A	H	A	H	A	H	A
Result	W	W	W	W	W	D	L	W	D	L	W	W	L	W	W	W	W	W	W	W	W	W	D	W	L	L	W	W	W	W	W	L	W	D	W	L	W	W
Position																																						

Source: Keuken Kampioen Divisie
A = Away; H = Home; W = Win; D = Draw; L = Loss

==== Matches ====
The league fixtures were announced on 17 June 2022.

7 August 2022 1	PEC Zwolle	2–1	De Graafschap	Zwolle
--:-- CEST (UTC+2)				Stadium: MAC³PARK Stadion

26 August 2022 4	PEC Zwolle	4–2	Jong PSV	Zwolle
--:-- CEST (UTC+2)				Stadium: MAC³PARK Stadion

9 September 2022 6	PEC Zwolle	2–2	Willem II	Zwolle
--:-- CEST (UTC+2)				Stadium: MAC³PARK Stadion

16 September 2022 7	PEC Zwolle	1–2	ADO Den Haag	Zwolle
--:-- CEST (UTC+2)				Stadium: MAC³PARK Stadion

30 September 2022 9	PEC Zwolle	1–1	Jong Ajax	Zwolle
--:-- CEST (UTC+2)				Stadium: MAC³PARK Stadion
