= Thomas van den Belt =

Dutch footballer (born 2001)

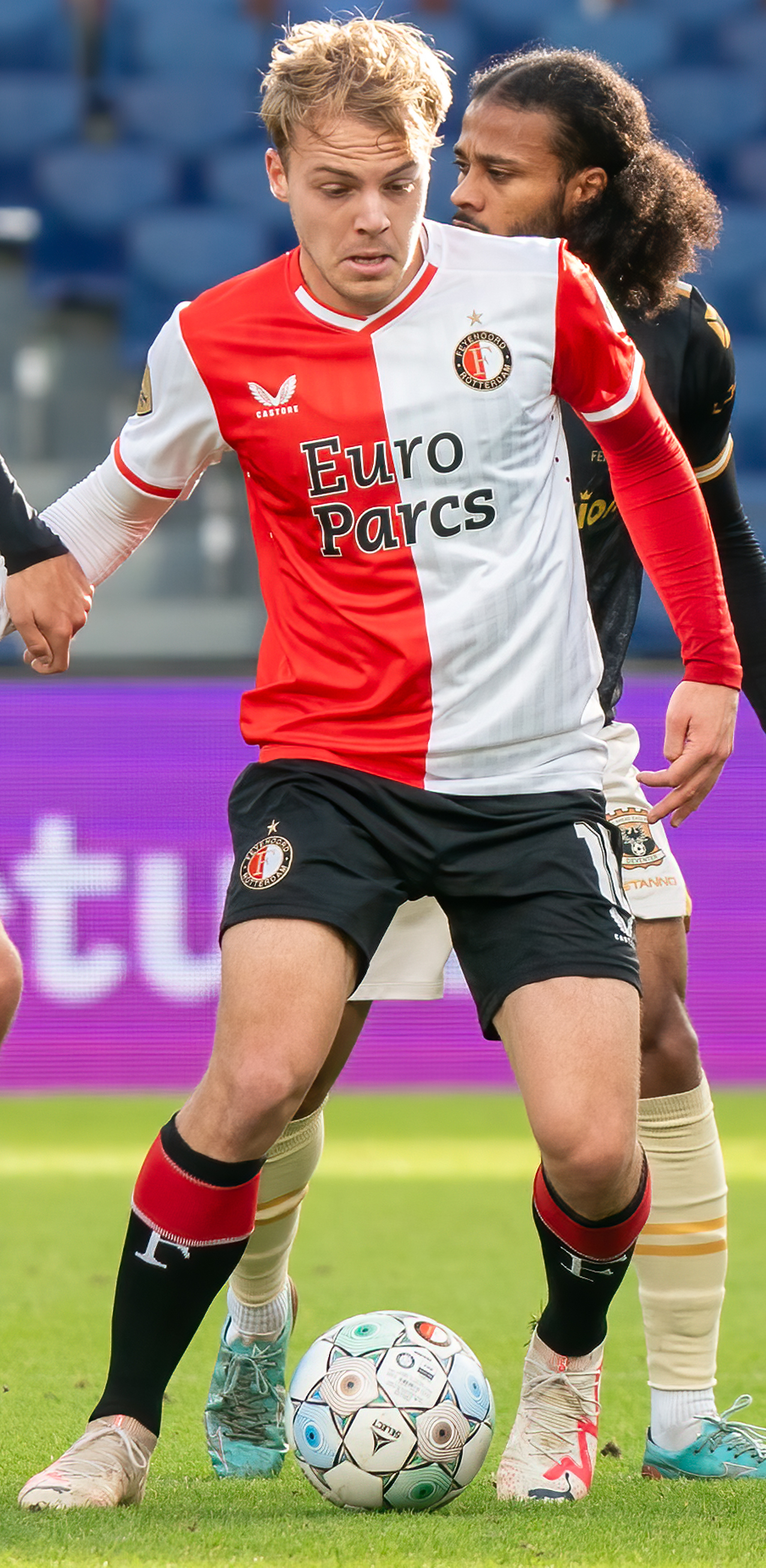
- Van den Belt playing for Feyenoord in 2023

Personal information
- Date of birth: 18 June 2001 (age 25)
- Place of birth: Zwolle, Netherlands
- Height: 1.81 m (5 ft 11 in)
- Position: Midfielder

Team information
- Current team: Twente
- Number: 20

Youth career
- 2006–2012: DOS Kampen
- 2012–2020: PEC Zwolle

Senior career*
Years	Team	Apps	(Gls)
2018–2023	PEC Zwolle	74	(19)
2023–2025	Feyenoord	9	(0)
2024–2025	→ Castellón (loan)	39	(6)
2025–	Twente	42	(4)

International career
2018	Netherlands U18	2	(0)
- * Club domestic league appearances and goals as of 25 October 2026

Thomas van den Belt (born 18 June 2001) is a Dutch professional footballer who plays as a midfielder for Eredivisie club Twente.

== Career ==
=== PEC Zwolle ===
Van den Belt started playing football as a five-year-old for DOS Kampen, before joining the PEC Zwolle academy in 2012. He made his professional debut on 26 September 2020, entering the match as a substitute for Yuta Nakayama in the 74th minute during a 4–0 home Eredivisie victory over Sparta Rotterdam.

On 14 January 2022, Van den Belt scored his first professional goals, securing a brace that led to PEC's 2–0 victory over Willem II.

He had a breakthrough season in 2022–23, scoring 16 goals from midfield in 35 Eerste Divisie appearances. His exceptional performance earned him the Player of the Season award and a spot on the Eerste Divisie Team of the Season.

=== Feyenoord ===
On 29 March 2023, Feyenoord announced that Van den Belt would be joining the club on a four-year contract from the start of the 2023–24. He made his debut for the club on 4 August, replacing Marcus Holmgren Pedersen in the 83rd minute of a 1–0 loss to rivals PSV in the Johan Cruyff Shield. His league debut for Feyenoord followed on 13 August, as he came on as a substitute for Calvin Stengs late in a 0–0 home draw against Fortuna Sittard. On 13 December, he went on to make his European debut, replacing Quinten Timber in the 54th minute of Feyenoord's 2–1 loss to Celtic in the UEFA Champions League group stage.

==== Loan to Castellón ====
On 1 August 2024, Van den Belt was loaned to Castellón in Spain for the 2024–25 season.

=== Twente ===
On 16 June 2025, Van den Belt signed a four-year contract at FC Twente.

== Career statistics ==
As of match played 25 October 2026

Appearances and goals by club, season and competition
Club	Season	League			KNVB Cup		Europe		Other		Total	
Club	Season	Division	Apps	Goals	Apps	Goals	Apps	Goals	Apps	Goal	Apps	Goal
PEC Zwolle	2020–21 (Note: Season curtailed due to COVID-19 pandemic in the Netherlands)	Eredivisie	9	0	0	0	—		—		9	0
PEC Zwolle	2021–22	Eredivisie	30	3	3	0	—		—		33	3
PEC Zwolle	2022–23	Eerste Divisie	35	16	2	0	—		—		37	16
PEC Zwolle	Total		74	19	5	0	—		—		79	19
Feyenoord	2023–24	Eredivisie	9	0	0	0	1 (Note: Appearance(s) in UEFA Champions League)	0	1 (Note: Appearance in Johan Cruyff Shield)	0	11	0
Castellón (loan)	2024–25	Segunda División	39	6	1	0	—		—		40	6
Twente	2025–26	Eredivisie	32	4	4	1	—		—		36	5
Twente	2026–27	Eredivisie	10	0	0	0	7 (Note: Two appearances in UEFA Europa League, five appearances and two goals in UEFA Conference League)	2	—		17	2
Twente	Total		42	4	4	1	7	2	—		53	7
Career total			163	29	10	1	8	2	1	0	183	32

== Honours ==
Feyenoord

- KNVB Cup: 2023–24

Individual

- Eerste Divisie Player of the Season: 2022–23
- Eerste Divisie Team of the Year: 2022–23
