= Gervane Kastaneer =

Curaçaoan footballer (born 1996)

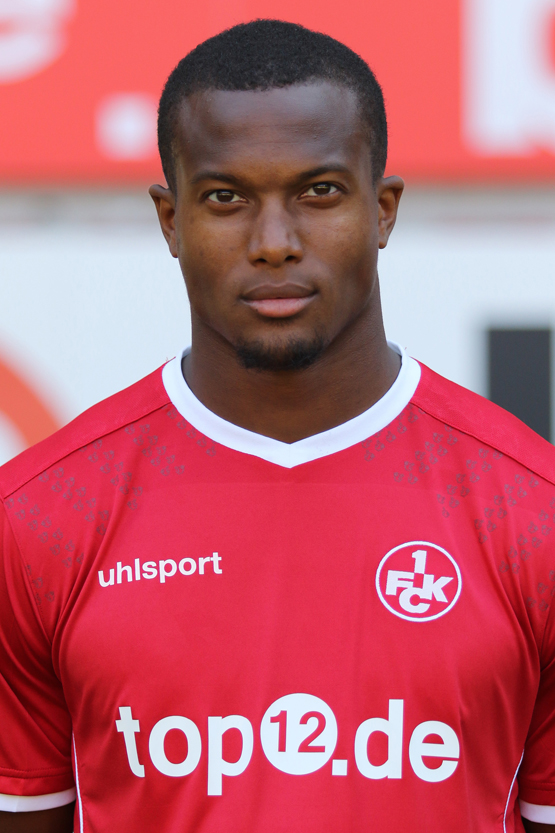
- Kastaneer with 1. FC Kaiserslautern in 2017

Personal information
- Full name: Gervane Zjandric Adonnis Kastaneer
- Date of birth: 9 June 1996 (age 30)
- Place of birth: Rotterdam, Netherlands
- Height: 1.85 m (6 ft 1 in)
- Position: Forward

Team information
- Current team: Terengganu
- Number: 9

Youth career
- IJVV De Zwervers
- 2005–2007: SC Feyenoord
- 2007–2012: Dordrecht

Senior career*
Years	Team	Apps	(Gls)
2012–2013	Dordrecht	3	(0)
2013–2017	ADO Den Haag	27	(5)
2016	→ FC Eindhoven (loan)	14	(4)
2017–2018	Kaiserslautern	10	(1)
2017–2018	→ Kaiserslautern II	3	(0)
2018–2019	NAC	21	(2)
2019–2021	Coventry City	12	(1)
2021	→ Hearts (loan)	6	(0)
2021–2023	PEC Zwolle	54	(3)
2023–2025	Castellón	15	(2)
2025	Persib Bandung	14	(1)
2025–2026	Persis Solo	12	(4)
2026–	Terengganu	7	(1)

International career^{‡}
2015	Netherlands U19	2	(0)
2015	Netherlands U20	11	(2)
2017	Netherlands U21	4	(0)
2018–	Curaçao	32	(9)
- * Club domestic league appearances and goals as of 15 May 2026 ‡ National team caps and goals as of 25 June 2026

Gervane Zjandric Adonnis Kastaneer (born 9 June 1996) is a professional footballer who plays as a forward for Malaysia Super League club Terengganu. Born in the Netherlands, he plays for the Curaçao national team.

== Club career ==
Kastaneer played for Eerste Divisie club FC Dordrecht during the 2012–2013 football season. From 2013 till 2017 he was contracted to ADO Den Haag while being loaned out to FC Eindhoven in 2016.

In July 2017, Kastaneer joined 2. Bundesliga side 1. FC Kaiserslautern signing a three-year contract.

In June 2018, after being released by Kaiserslautern, Kastaneer returned to the Eredivisie signing a two-year contract with NAC Breda.

=== Coventry City ===
In June 2019, Kastaneer signed a three-year deal with English Championship side Coventry City for an undisclosed fee. On 1 February 2020, Kastaneer joined Scottish Championship side Heart of Midlothian on loan until the end of the 2020–21 season. On 6 July 2021, it was announced that Kastaneer's contract with the club had been terminated by mutual consent, leaving the club having made 18 appearances in all competitions and having scored one goal.

=== PEC Zwolle ===
In July 2021, Kastaneer signed a two-year deal with Dutch Eredivisie side PEC Zwolle, with an option for another year. He made his debut on 15 August in a 1–0 home loss to Vitesse, starting as a right winger before coming off for Chardi Landu in the 65th minute.

=== Persib Bandung ===
On 8 January 2025, Kastaneer signed one and a half-year contract with Liga 1 Indonesia club Persib Bandung. On 6 June 2025, Kastaneer officially left Persib Bandung.

=== Terengganu ===
On 27 January 2026, Kastaneer was announced as the latest signing for the Malaysia Super League club Terengganu.

== International career ==
Kastaneer was born in the Netherlands and is of Curaçaoan descent. Originally a youth international for the Netherlands, he switched and debuted for the Curaçao national team in a 5–0 CONCACAF Nations League win over the US Virgin Islands on 12 October 2018.

Kastaneer scored his first international hat-trick in a 5–0 win over Saint Lucia during the 2024–25 CONCACAF Nations League B.

On 18 May 2026, he was named by head coach Dick Advocaat in the 26-man squad for the 2026 FIFA World Cup, marking the country's first-ever appearance at the tournament.

== Career statistics ==
=== Club ===
As of match played 4 January 2026

Appearances and goals by club, season and competition
Club	Season	League			National cup		League cup		Other		Total	
Club	Season	Division	Apps	Goals	Apps	Goals	Apps	Goals	Apps	Goals	Apps	Goals
Dordrecht	2012–13	Eerste Divisie	3	0	0	0	—		1 (Note: Appearance in the 2013 Eredivisie promotion play-offs)	0	4	0
ADO Den Haag	2014–15	Eredivisie	8	1	0	0	—		—		8	1
ADO Den Haag	2015–16	Eredivisie	5	0	1	0	—		—		6	0
ADO Den Haag	2016–17	Eredivisie	14	4	2	2	—		—		16	6
ADO Den Haag	Total		27	5	3	2	0	0	0	0	30	7
Eindhoven (loan)	2015–16	Eerste Divisie	14	4	0	0	—		2 (Note: Appearances in the 2016 Eredivisie promotion play-offs)	1	16	5
1. FC Kaiserslautern	2017–18	2. Bundesliga	10	1	1	0	—		—		11	1
1. FC Kaiserslautern II	2017–18	Oberliga	3	0	—		—		—		3	0
NAC Breda	2018–19	Eredivisie	21	2	1	0	—		—		22	2
Coventry City	2019–20	League One	10	1	0	0	2	0	4 (Note: Appearance in the EFL Trophy)	0	16	1
Coventry City	2020–21	Championship	2	0	0	0	0	0	—		2	0
Coventry City	Total		12	1	0	0	2	0	4	0	18	1
Heart of Midlothian (loan)	2020–21	Scottish Championship	6	0	1	0	0	0	—		7	0
PEC Zwolle	2021–22	Eredivisie	31	2	2	0	—		—		33	2
PEC Zwolle	2022–23	Eerste Divisie	23	1	1	0	—		—		24	1
PEC Zwolle	Total		54	3	3	0	—		—		57	3
Castellón	2023–24	Primera Federación	15	2	2	0	—		—		17	2
Persib Bandung	2024–25	Liga 1	14	1	0	0	—		—		14	1
Persis Solo	2025–26	Super League	13	4	0	0	—		—		13	4
Terengganu	2025–26	Malaysia Super League	7	1	2	1	—		—		9	2
Career total			199	24	13	3	2	0	7	1	221	28

=== International ===
As of match played 25 June 2026

Appearances and goals by national team and year
National team	Year	Apps	Goals
Curaçao	2018	1	0
Curaçao	2019	2	1
Curaçao	2021	3	0
Curaçao	2022	3	0
Curaçao	2023	2	0
Curaçao	2024	6	4
Curaçao	2025	7	4
Curaçao	2026	8	0
Total		32	9

Scores and results list Curaçao's goal tally first, score column indicates score after each Kastaneer goal.

List of international goals scored by Gervane Kastaneer
No.	Date	Venue	Opponent	Score	Result	Competition	Ref.
1	23 March 2019	Sir Vivian Richards Stadium, North Sound, Antigua and Barbuda	Antigua and Barbuda	1–1	1–2	2019–20 CONCACAF Nations League qualifying	
2	5 June 2024	Ergilio Hato Stadium, Willemstad, Curaçao	Barbados	4–1	4–1	2026 FIFA World Cup qualification	
3	9 September 2024	Kirani James Athletic Stadium, St. George's, Grenada	Saint Martin	2–0	4–0	2024–25 CONCACAF Nations League B	
4	18 November 2024	Ergilio Hato Stadium, Willemstad, Curaçao	Saint Lucia	1–0	4–1	2024–25 CONCACAF Nations League B	
5	18 November 2024	Ergilio Hato Stadium, Willemstad, Curaçao	Saint Lucia	2–1	4–1	2024–25 CONCACAF Nations League B	
6	6 June 2025	Ergilio Hato Stadium, Willemstad, Curaçao	Saint Lucia	1–0	4–0	2026 FIFA World Cup qualification	
7	6 June 2025	Ergilio Hato Stadium, Willemstad, Curaçao	Saint Lucia	2–0	4–0	2026 FIFA World Cup qualification	
8	6 June 2025	Ergilio Hato Stadium, Willemstad, Curaçao	Saint Lucia	3–0	4–0	2026 FIFA World Cup qualification	
9	10 June 2025	Trinidad Stadium, Oranjestad, Aruba	Haiti	1–0	5–1	2026 FIFA World Cup qualification	

== Honours ==
Coventry City

- EFL League One: 2019–20

Heart of Midlothian

- Scottish Championship: 2020–21

Persib Bandung

- Liga 1: 2024–25

Curaçao

- King's Cup: 2019
