= 2026–27 Birżebbuġa St. Peter's F.C. season =

Malta football season

Birżebbuġa St. Peter's
2026–27 season
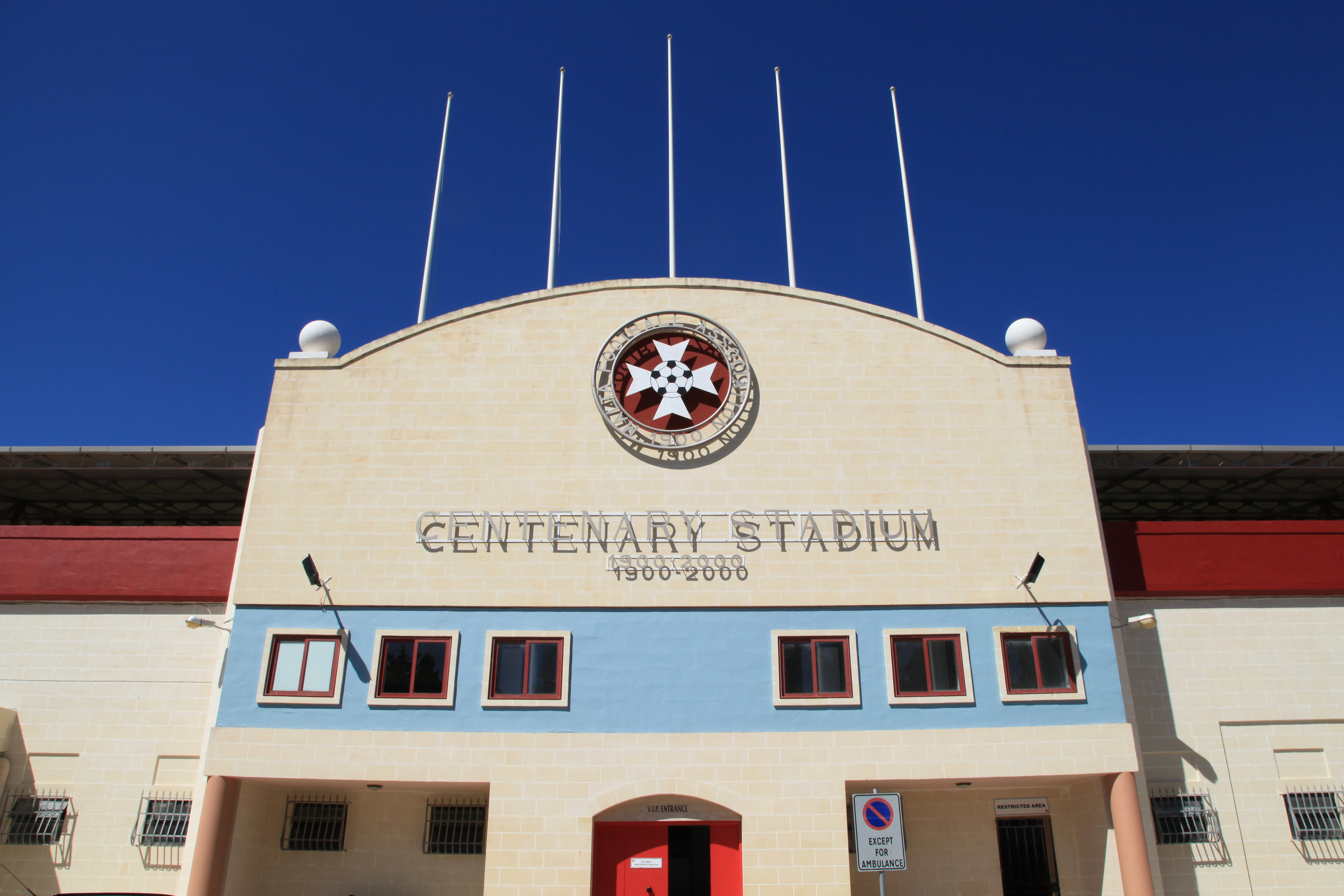
- Centenary Stadium
- Owner: Ketan Makwana
- Director: Joseph Mangion
- Manager: Edgar Degabriele (until 8 September 2026); Luciano Santana (from 9 September 2026, until now)
- Stadium: Centenary Stadium
- Premier League: 12th
- Maltese FA Trophy: TBD
- Muscat Cup: Runners-up
- Top goalscorer: League: Gabriel Costa (3); Alex Bruno (3); All: Gabriel Costa (3); Alex Bruno (3)
- Biggest win: Birżebbuġa St. Peter's 2-0 Marsaxlokk
- Biggest defeat: Birżebbuġa St. Peter's 0-3 Floriana; Balzan 3-0 Birżebbuġa St. Peter's
| Home colours | Away colours |

During the 2026–27 season, Birżebbuġa St. Peter's F.C. competed in the Maltese Premier League. In addition to the domestic league, the club will participate in this season's editions of the Maltese FA Trophy.

== Season summary ==
Following promotion to the Maltese Premier League in June 2026, the club redesigned the new crest, which reflects the identity of Birżebbuġa St. Peter's FC. 77 Sports Investments announced it had acquired an 80% stake in the Birżebbuġa St. Peter's.

Edgar Degabriele was confirmed as the team's manager after leading the team to the promotion in the Maltese Premier League. The season began with the release of Joey Vella, Christopher Mario Baker, James Pisani, Duván Mosquera, William James, Paul Lapira and Charles Chibuike. Jamie Scerri, Malta's Miguel Azzopardi and Leonardo Agius have returned from loan spells at their respective clubs Żabbar and Mosta.

On 4 June 2026, the Birżebbuġa St. Peter's signed the brazilian striker Yuri de Jesus Messias. On 7 July 2026, the club signed also the italian goalkeeper Mattia Chiesa. The club has shown interest in the Danish midfielder Rasmus Thellufsen.

The team will make their Malta Premier League debut in August against Floriana. In July 2026, following the promotion, the management's club extended the contracts of Daniel Zerafa, Zachary Cassar, Matthew Xuereb, Julian Azzopardi, Juan Bolaños and the captain Hubert Vella.

On 27 July 2026 the club signed the italian defender Mattia Santi. The club signed also belgian midfielder Pietro Tomaselli also Shaun Dimech.

On 8 September 2026, Edgar Degabriele resigned as Head Coach of the club. On 9 September 2026, Luciano Santana was appointed as new coach. On 18 November 18, Yuri Messias and the club terminated his contract by mutual agreement.

== Players ==
=== Squad information ===
As of 1 October 2026

| Squad no. | Name | Nationality | Position | Date of birth (age) |
Goalkeepers
| 1 | Mattia Chiesa | (Italy) | GK | 20 April 1998 (aged 28) |
| 22 | Julian Azzopardi | (Malta) | GK | 9 October 1987 (aged 38) |
| | Isaac Abela | (Malta) | GK | 22 May 2005 (aged 21) |
Defenders
| 4 | Miguel Azzopardi (on loan from Żabbar St. Patrick) | (Malta) | DF | 24 May 2004 (aged 21) |
| 5 | Zachary Cassar | (Malta) | DF | 31 July 1997 (aged 28) |
| 6 | Christopher Cutajar | (Malta) | DF | 27 July 1993 (aged 31) |
| 14 | Sam Azimzadeh Tabrizi | (Canada) | DF | 29 October 2022 (aged 3) |
| 17 | Jacob Walker | (Malta) | DF | 31 July 1997 (aged 28) |
| 25 | Juan Bolaños | (Colombia) | DF | 22 July 1991 (aged 33) |
| 26 | Alessandro Coppola | (Italy) | DF | 13 March 2000 (aged 26) |
| 77 | Aiden Barbara | (Malta) | DF | 13 March 2000 (aged 26) |
| 33 | Aiden Barbara | (Malta) | DF | 21 December 2007 (aged 17) |
| 94 | Daniel Zerafa | (Malta) | DF | 14 June 2007 (aged 18) |
| | Jurgen Farrugia | (Malta) | DF | 14 September 1981 (aged 43) |
Midfielders
| 2 | Gustavo Felipe | (Brazil) | MF | 28 January 1997 (aged 28) |
| 6 | Hubert Vella (Captain) | (Malta) | MF | 2 November 1998 (aged 27) |
| 7 | Shaun Dimech | (Malta) | MF | 8 August 2001 (aged 24) |
| 11 | Pietro Tomaselli | (Belgium) (Italy) | MF | 17 November 2004 (aged 21) |
| 18 | Renan Riquelme | (Brazil) | MF | 24 July 2006 (aged 19) |
| 18 | Rasmus Thellufsen | (Denmark) | MF | 9 January 1997 (aged 29) |
| 20 | Gabriel Costa | (Brazil) | MF | 26 February 1998 (aged 28) |
| 21 | Kurt Bondin | (Malta) | MF | 3 June 2002 (aged 24) |
| 24 | Luis Riascos | (Colombia) | MF | 17 September 2001 (aged 24) |
| 29 | Alex Bruno | (Brazil) | MF | 7 October 1993 (aged 32) |
| 30 | Mattia Santi | (Italy) | MF | 11 January 2003 (aged 22) |
| 98 | Jackson Mendoza | (Colombia) | MF | 11 September 1998 (aged 27) |
Forwards
| 8 | Matthew Xuereb | (Malta) | FW | 3 March 2001 (aged 25) |
| 9 | Daishawn Redan | (Netherlands) | FW | 2 February 2001 (aged 25) |
| 10 | Yuri Messias | (Brazil) | FW | 11 September 1991 (aged 34) |
| 11 | Yusuf Sulaiman | (Nigeria) | FW | 15 May 2005 (aged 21) |
| 12 | Joshua Osebomen | (Nigeria) | FW | 9 January 2007 (aged 19) |
| 15 | Stipe Tokic | (Bosnia and Herzegovina) (Croatia) | FW | 14 January 2002 (aged 24) |
| 16 | Kane Tippett | (Malta) | FW | 9 May 2001 (aged 25) |
| 97 | Godberg Cooper | (Italy) | FW | 20 August 1997 (aged 28) |
| | Gabriel Borg | (Malta) | FW | 28 September 1999 (aged 26) |

== Transfers ==
=== In ===
| Date | Pos. | Player | Age | Moving from | Type | Fee | Source |
Summer
| 4 July 2026 | FW | (Brazil) Yuri Messias | 34 | (Malta) Valletta | Transfer | Free | |
| 17 July 2026 | MF | (Colombia) Jackson Mendoza | 28 | (Malta) Valletta | Transfer | Free | |
| 18 July 2026 | DF | (Italy) Mattia Santi | 23 | (Italy) Borgoricco | Transfer | Free | |
| 23 July 2026 | DF | (Malta) Miguel Azzopardi | 22 | (Malta) Żabbar | Loan | Free | |
| 27 July 2026 | MF | (Belgium) Pietro Tomaselli | 21 | Free Agent | Transfer | Free | |
| 29 July 2026 | MF | (Malta) Shaun Dimech | 24 | Free Agent | Transfer | Free | |
| 31 July 2026 | GK | (Italy) Mattia Chiesa | 26 | (Italy) Hellas Verona | Transfer | Free | |
| 1 August 2026 | MF | (Canada) Sam Azimzadeh Tabrizi | 23 | (Romania) Câmpulung | Transfer | Free | |
| 4 August 2026 | FW | (Netherlands) Daishawn Redan | 25 | Free Agent | Transfer | Free | |
| 5 August 2026 | MF | (Malta) Kurt Bondin | 24 | (Malta) Melita | Transfer | Free | |
| 6 August 2026 | MF | (Denmark) Rasmus Thellufsen | 29 | (Norway) Bryne | Transfer | Free | |
| 7 August 2026 | MF | (Italy) Alessandro Coppola | 26 | (Malta) Birkirkara | Transfer | Free | |
| 9 August 2026 | FW | (Bosnia and Herzegovina) Stipe Tokic | 24 | (Italy) Sassari Latte Dolce | Transfer | Free | |
| 10 August 2026 | MF | (Brazil) Gabriel Costa | 28 | Free Agent | Transfer | Free | |
| 11 August 2026 | DF | (Brazil) Gustavo Felipe | 28 | Free Agent | Transfer | Free | |
| 11 August 2026 | MF | (Colombia) Luis Riascos | 24 | Free Agent | Transfer | Free | |
| 21 August 2026 | MF | (Malta) Zachary Scerri | 30 | (Malta) Floriana | Transfer | Free | |
| 10 September 2026 | FW | (Italy) Godberg Cooper | 29 | (Romania) ASU Politehnica Timișoara | Transfer | Free | |

=== Out ===
| Date | Pos. | Player | Age | Moving from | Type | Fee | Source |
Summer
| 1 July 2026 | MF | (Malta) Nathan Attard | 24 | (Malta) Vittoriosa | Transfer | Free | |
| 1 July 2026 | MF | (Malta) Jamie Scerri | 22 | (Malta) Mosta | Loan return | Free | |
| 1 July 2026 | MF | (Malta) Randall Vella | 34 | (Malta) Lija Athletic | Transfer | Free | |
| 1 July 2026 | FW | (Nigeria) Joshua Osebomen | 19 | (Malta) San Ġwann | Transfer | Free | |
| 1 July 2026 | MF | (Malta) Diego Christian Mifsud | 27 | Retired | Transfer | Free | |
| 1 July 2026 | MF | (Malta) Andrea Sant | 28 | Retired | Transfer | Free | |
| 7 July 2026 | MF | (Brazil) Renan Riquelme | 20 | Unattached | Transfer | Free | |
| 7 July 2026 | FW | (Nigeria) Yusuf Sulaiman | 21 | Unattached | Transfer | Free | |
| 16 July 2026 | MF | (Malta) Paul Lapira | 28 | Unattached | Transfer | Free | |
| 18 July 2026 | DF | (Malta) Miguel Azzopardi | 22 | (Malta) Żabbar | Loan return | Free | |
| 18 July 2026 | MF | (Malta) Leonardo Agius | 23 | (Malta) Żabbar | Loan return | Free | |
| 18 July 2026 | MF | (Malta) Joey Vella | 31 | Unattached | Transfer | Free | |
| 18 July 2026 | MF | (England) Christopher Mario Baker | 36 | Unattached | Transfer | Free | |
| 19 July 2026 | GK | (Malta) James Pisani | 31 | Unattached | Transfer | Free | |
| 20 July 2026 | FW | (Colombia) Duván Mosquera | 30 | Unattached | Transfer | Free | |
| 20 July 2026 | FW | (Malta) William James | 22 | Unattached | Transfer | Free | |
| 20 July 2026 | FW | (Nigeria) Charles Chibuike | 23 | Unattached | Transfer | Free | |
| 1 August 2026 | MF | (Nigeria) Philip Ogbile | 23 | (Malta) Pembroke Athleta | Transfer | Free | |
| 18 November 2026 | FW | (Brazil) Yuri Messias | 34 | Unattached | Transfer | Free | |

== Pre-season and friendlies ==
Win Draw Loss

| 14 July 2025 Friendly | Mosta (Malta) | 0–4 | (Malta) Birżebbuġa | Mosta |
| EET (UTC+02:00) | | Report | | Stadium: Charles Abela Memorial Stadium |

| 24 July 2025 Friendly | Birżebbuġa (Malta) | 0–0 | (Malta) Balzan | Mosta |
| EET (UTC+02:00) | | Report | | Stadium: Charles Abela Memorial Stadium |

| 28 July 2025 Friendly | Ħamrun Spartans (Malta) | 0–1 | (Malta) Birżebbuġa | Hamrun |
| EET (UTC+02:00) | | | | Stadium: Victor Tedesco Stadium |

| 1 August 2026 Friendly | Birżebbuġa (Malta) | 2–1 | (Malta) Gżira United | Mosta |
| EET (UTC+02:00) | | Report | | Stadium: Charles Abela Memorial Stadium |

== Competitions ==
=== Overall record ===
| Competition | First match | Last match | Starting round | Record | | | | | | | |
| Competition | First match | Last match | Starting round | Pld | W | D | L | GF | GA | GD | Win % |
|---|---|---|---|---|---|---|---|---|---|---|---|
| Premier League | 14 August 2026 | 2027 | Matchday 1 | 13 | 1 | 4 | 8 | 11 | 24 | −13 | 7.69 |
| Maltese FA Trophy | 2026 | | Round of 32 | 0 | 0 | 0 | 0 | 0 | 0 | +0 | — |
| Gammari Muscat Cup Final | 8 August 2026 | 8 August 2026 | Runner-Up | 1 | 0 | 0 | 1 | 0 | 1 | −1 | 0.00 |
| Total | | | | 14 | 1 | 4 | 9 | 11 | 25 | −14 | 7.14 |

Last updated: 21 November 2026
Source: Results

=== Maltese Premier League ===
==== League table ====
| Pos | Team | Pld | W | D | L | GF | GA | GD | Pts | Qualification |
|---|---|---|---|---|---|---|---|---|---|---|
| 8 | Żabbar St. Patrick | 11 | 4 | 2 | 5 | 17 | 16 | +1 | 14 | Qualification for the Play-Out |
| 9 | Mosta | 11 | 3 | 5 | 3 | 15 | 20 | −5 | 14 | Qualification for the Play-Out |
| 10 | Balzan | 11 | 2 | 5 | 4 | 13 | 14 | −1 | 11 | Qualification for the Play-Out |
| 11 | Birzebbuga St. Peter's | 11 | 1 | 3 | 7 | 9 | 21 | −12 | 6 | Qualification for the Play-Out |
| 12 | Gżira United | 11 | 0 | 5 | 6 | 9 | 26 | −17 | 5 | Qualification for the Play-Out |

Rules for classification: 1) Points; 2) Head-to-head points; 3) Head-to-head goal difference; 4) Head-to-head goals scored; 5) Goal difference; 6) Goals scored; 7) Play-offs (only if needed to decide champions, teams for relegation or teams for UEFA competitions).

==== Results summary ====
| Overall | | | | | | | | Home | | | | | | Away | | | | | |
| Pld | W | D | L | GF | GA | GD | Pts | W | D | L | GF | GA | GD | W | D | L | GF | GA | GD |
|---|---|---|---|---|---|---|---|---|---|---|---|---|---|---|---|---|---|---|---|
| 13 | 1 | 4 | 8 | 11 | 21 | −10 | 7 | 1 | 1 | 5 | 5 | 10 | −5 | 0 | 3 | 3 | 6 | 11 | −5 |

Last updated: 21 November 2026.
Source: Results

==== Results by round ====
| Round | 1 | 2 | 3 | 4 | 5 | 6 | 7 | 8 | 9 | 10 | 11 |
|---|---|---|---|---|---|---|---|---|---|---|---|
| Ground | H | A | H | A | H | H | A | A | H | A | A |
| Result | L | L | L | L | L | L | D | L | W | D | D |
| Position | 12 | 12 | 12 | 12 | 12 | 12 | 12 | 12 | 12 | 12 | 11 |

Updated to match(es) played on 31 October 2026. Source: Results
A = Away; H = Home; W = Win; D = Draw; L = Loss

=== Results by round Relegation group results ===
| Round | 1 | 2 |
|---|---|---|
| Ground | H | H |
| Result | D | L |
| Position | 11 | 11 |

Updated to match(es) played on November 2026. Source: Results
A = Away; H = Home; W = Win; D = Draw; L = Loss

==== Matches ====
| 14 August 2026 1 | Birżebbuġa | 0–3 | Floriana | Ta' Qali |
| 15:30 EEST (UTC+03:00) | | Report | | Stadium: Centenary Stadium |

| 22 August 2026 2 | Żabbar | 1–0 | Birżebbuġa | Paola, Malta |
| 15:30 EEST (UTC+03:00) | | Report | | Stadium: Tony Bezzina Stadium |

| 30 August 2026 3 | Birżebbuġa | 1–2 | Sliema Wanderers | Ta' Qali |
| 15:30 EEST (UTC+03:00) | | Report | | Stadium: Centenary Stadium |

| 5 September 2026 4 | Balzan | 3–0 | Birżebbuġa | Ta' Qali |
| 15:30 EEST (UTC+03:00) | | Report | | Stadium: National Stadium |

| 11 September 2026 5 | Birżebbuġa | 0–2 | Hamrun Spartans | Hamrun |
| 15:30 EEST (UTC+03:00) | | Report | | Stadium: Victor Tedesco Stadium |

| 19 September 2026 6 | Birżebbuġa | 0–3 | Valletta | Hamrun |
| 15:30 EEST (UTC+03:00) | | Report | | Stadium: Victor Tedesco Stadium |

| 10 October 2026 7 | Mosta | 2–2 | Birżebbuġa | Mosta |
| 15:30 EEST (UTC+03:00) | | Report | | Stadium: Charles Abela Memorial Stadium |

| 17 October 2026 8 | Hibernians | 1–0 | Birżebbuġa | Paola |
| 15:30 EEST (UTC+03:00) | | Report | | Stadium: Tony Bezzina Stadium |

| 21 October 2026 9 | Birżebbuġa | 2–0 | Marsaxlokk | Ta' Qali |
| 15:30 EEST (UTC+03:00) | | Report | | Stadium: National Stadium |

| 25 October 2026 10 | Gżira United | 2–2 | Birżebbuġa | Ta' Qali |
| 15:30 EEST (UTC+03:00) | | Report | | Stadium: Centenary Stadium |

| 31 October 2026 11 | Birkirkara | 2–2 | Birżebbuġa | Ta' Qali |
| 15:30 EEST (UTC+03:00) | | Report | | Stadium: National Stadium |

=== Relegation Play-offs group results ===
| 6 November 2026 1 | Birżebbuġa | 0–0 | Mosta | Ta' Qali |
| 15:30 EEST (UTC+03:00) | | | | Stadium: Centenary Stadium |

| 21 November 2026 2 | Birżebbuġa | 2–3 | Birkirkara | Ta' Qali |
| 15:30 EEST (UTC+03:00) | | | | Stadium: National Stadium |

| 28 November 2026 3 | Birżebbuġa | x–x | Gżira United | Ta' Qali |
| 15:30 EEST (UTC+03:00) | | | | Stadium: Centenary Stadium |

| 28 November 2026 4 | Birżebbuġa | x–x | Balzan | Ta' Qali |
| 15:30 EEST (UTC+03:00) | | | | Stadium: Centenary Stadium |

| 12 December 2026 5 | Żabbar | x–x | Birżebbuġa | Paola, Malta |
| 15:30 EEST (UTC+03:00) | | | | Stadium: Tony Bezzina Stadium |

=== Maltese FA Trophy ===
| 18 December 2026 32 | St. Andrews | x–x | Birżebbuġa St. Peter's |
| EEST (UTC+3) |

=== Gammari Muscat Cup Final ===
| 8 August 2026 | Birżebbuġa | 0–1 | Sliema Wanderers | Mosta |
| EEST (UTC+3) | | Report | Limbombe 79' | Stadium: Charles Abela Memorial Stadium |

== Statistics ==
=== Appearances and goals ===
| No. | Pos | Nat | Player | Total | | Maltese Premier League | | Maltese FA Trophy | | Play-offs | |
| No. | Pos | Nat | Player | Apps | Goals | Apps | Goals | Apps | Goals | Apps | Goals |
Goalkeepers
| 1 | GK | (Italy) ITA | Mattia Chiesa | 12 | 0 | 12 | 0 | 0 | 0 | 0 | 0 |
| 22 | GK | (Malta) MLT | Julian Azzopardi | 1 | 0 | 1 | 0 | 0 | 0 | 0 | 0 |
| | GK | (Malta) MLT | Isaac Abela | 0 | 0 | 0 | 0 | 0 | 0 | 0 | 0 |
Defenders
| 4 | DF | (Malta) MLT | Muguel Azzopardi | 6 | 0 | 6 | 0 | 0 | 0 | 0 | 0 |
| 5 | DF | (Malta) MLT | Zachary Cassar | 11 | 0 | 11 | 0 | 0 | 0 | 0 | 0 |
| 6 | DF | (Malta) MLT | Hubert Vella | 0 | 0 | 0 | 0 | 0 | 0 | 0 | 0 |
| 14 | DF | (Canada) CAN | Sam Azimzadeh Tabrizi | 2 | 0 | 2 | 0 | 0 | 0 | 0 | 0 |
| 17 | DF | (Malta) MLT | Jacob Walker | 3 | 0 | 3 | 0 | 0 | 0 | 0 | 0 |
| 25 | DF | (Colombia) COL | Juan Bolaños | 11 | 1 | 11 | 1 | 0 | 0 | 0 | 0 |
| 26 | DF | (Italy) ITA | Alessandro Coppola | 3 | 0 | 3 | 0 | 0 | 0 | 0 | 0 |
| 77 | DF | (Malta) MLT | Aiden Barbara | 0 | 0 | 0 | 0 | 0 | 0 | 0 | 0 |
| | DF | (Malta) MLT | Jurgen Farrugia | 0 | 0 | 0 | 0 | 0 | 0 | 0 | 0 |
| | DF | (Malta) MLT | Christopher Cutajar | 0 | 0 | 0 | 0 | 0 | 0 | 0 | 0 |
Midfielders
| 2 | MF | (Brazil) BRA | Gustavo Felipe | 12 | 0 | 12 | 0 | 0 | 0 | 0 | 0 |
| 3 | MF | (Malta) MLT | Federico Galea | 2 | 1 | 2 | 1 | 0 | 0 | 0 | 0 |
| 7 | MF | (Malta) MLT | Shaun Dimech | 8 | 0 | 8 | 0 | 0 | 0 | 0 | 0 |
| 8 | MF | (Malta) MLT | Matthew Xuereb | 5 | 0 | 5 | 0 | 0 | 0 | 0 | 0 |
| 18 | MF | (Denmark) DEN | Rasmus Thellufsen | 10 | 0 | 10 | 0 | 0 | 0 | 0 | 0 |
| 19 | MF | (Malta) MLT | Elyas Grioli | 2 | 0 | 2 | 0 | 0 | 0 | 0 | 0 |
| 21 | MF | (Malta) MLT | Kurt Bondin | 11 | 0 | 11 | 0 | 0 | 0 | 0 | 0 |
| 23 | MF | (Spain) ESP | Juan Belfiore | 0 | 0 | 0 | 0 | 0 | 0 | 0 | 0 |
| 24 | MF | (Colombia) COL | Luis Riascos | 8 | 0 | 8 | 0 | 0 | 0 | 0 | 0 |
| 28 | MF | (Malta) MLT | Kurt Bondin | 0 | 0 | 0 | 0 | 0 | 0 | 0 | 0 |
| 29 | MF | (Brazil) BRA | Alex Bruno | 12 | 3 | 12 | 3 | 0 | 0 | 0 | 0 |
| 30 | MF | (Malta) MLT | Andrea Santi | 0 | 0 | 0 | 0 | 0 | 0 | 0 | 0 |
| 88 | MF | (Malta) MLT | Zach Scerri | 12 | 0 | 12 | 0 | 0 | 0 | 0 | 0 |
| 94 | MF | (Malta) MLT | Daniel Zerafa | 2 | 0 | 2 | 0 | 0 | 0 | 0 | 0 |
| 98 | MF | (Colombia) COL | Jackson Mendoza | 11 | 0 | 11 | 0 | 0 | 0 | 0 | 0 |
Forwards
| 8 | FW | (Malta) MLT | Jurgen Farrugia | 0 | 0 | 0 | 0 | 0 | 0 | 0 | 0 |
| 9 | FW | (Netherlands) NED | Daishawn Redan | 0 | 0 | 0 | 0 | 0 | 0 | 0 | 0 |
| 11 | FW | (Belgium) BEL | Pietro Tomaselli | 8 | 0 | 8 | 0 | 0 | 0 | 0 | 0 |
| 15 | FW | (Bosnia and Herzegovina) BIH | Stipe Tokic | 11 | 2 | 11 | 2 | 0 | 0 | 0 | 0 |
| 20 | MF | (Brazil) BRA | Gabriel Costa Concave | 12 | 3 | 12 | 3 | 0 | 0 | 0 | 0 |
| 97 | FW | (Italy) ITA | Godberg Cooper | 2 | 0 | 2 | 0 | 0 | 0 | 0 | 0 |
| | FW | (Malta) MLT | Gabriel Borg | 0 | 0 | 0 | 0 | 0 | 0 | 0 | 0 |
Players transferred out during the season
| 10 | FW | (Brazil) BRA | Yuri Messias | 12 | 1 | 12 | 1 | 0 | 0 | 0 | 0 |

Source: Competitions

Last updated: 21 November 2026

=== Goalscorers ===
| Rank | No. | Pos | Nat | Name | Premier League | FA Trophy | BOV Challenge Cup | Play-offs | Total |
|---|---|---|---|---|---|---|---|---|---|
| 1 | 20 | MF | (Brazil) | Gabriel Costa | 3 | 0 | 0 | 0 | 3 |
| 2 | 29 | MF | (Brazil) | Alex Bruno | 3 | 0 | 0 | 0 | 3 |
| 3 | 15 | FW | (Bosnia and Herzegovina) | Stipe Tokic | 2 | 0 | 0 | 0 | 2 |
| 4 | 10 | FW | (Brazil) | Yuri Messias | 1 | 0 | 0 | 0 | 1 |
| 5 | 25 | DF | (Colombia) | Juan Bolaños | 1 | 0 | 0 | 0 | 1 |
| 6 | 3 | MF | (Malta) | Federico Galea | 1 | 0 | 0 | 0 | 1 |
| | | | | Total | 11 | 0 | 0 | 0 | 11 |

Last updated: 21 November 2026

=== Clean sheets ===
| Rank | No. | Pos | Nat | Name | Premier League | FA Trophy | BOV Challenge Cup | Play-offs | Total |
|---|---|---|---|---|---|---|---|---|---|
| 1 | 1 | GK | (Italy) | Mattia Chiesa | 2 | 0 | 0 | 0 | 2 |
| | | | | Total | 2 | 0 | 0 | 0 | 2 |

Last updated: 18 November 2026

=== Disciplinary record ===
| No. | Pos | Nat | Player | Maltese Premier League | | | FA Trophy | | | Play-offs | | | Total | | |
| No. | Pos | Nat | Player | Yellow card | (yellow card) (yellow-red card) | Red card | Yellow card | (yellow card) (yellow-red card) | Red card | Yellow card | (yellow card) (yellow-red card) | Red card | Yellow card | (yellow card) (yellow-red card) | Red card |
| 25 | DF | (Colombia) | Juan Bolaños | 5 | 0 | 0 | 0 | 0 | 0 | 0 | 0 | 0 | 5 | 0 | 0 |
| 5 | DF | (Malta) | Zachary Cassar | 4 | 0 | 0 | 0 | 0 | 0 | 0 | 0 | 0 | 4 | 0 | 0 |
| 20 | MF | (Brazil) | Gabriel Costa | 4 | 0 | 0 | 0 | 0 | 0 | 0 | 0 | 0 | 4 | 0 | 0 |
| 98 | MF | (Colombia) | Jackson Mendoza | 3 | 0 | 1 | 0 | 0 | 0 | 0 | 0 | 0 | 3 | 0 | 1 |
| 17 | DF | (Malta) | Jacob Walker | 2 | 1 | 0 | 0 | 0 | 0 | 0 | 0 | 0 | 2 | 1 | 0 |
| 2 | MF | (Brazil) | Gustavo Felipe | 2 | 0 | 0 | 0 | 0 | 0 | 0 | 0 | 0 | 2 | 0 | 0 |
| 11 | MF | (Belgium) | Pietro Tomaselli | 2 | 0 | 0 | 0 | 0 | 0 | 0 | 0 | 0 | 2 | 0 | 0 |
| 24 | MF | (Colombia) | Luis Riascos | 2 | 0 | 0 | 0 | 0 | 0 | 0 | 0 | 0 | 2 | 0 | 0 |
| 29 | MF | (Brazil) | Alex Bruno | 2 | 0 | 0 | 0 | 0 | 0 | 0 | 0 | 0 | 2 | 0 | 0 |
| 1 | GK | (Italy) | Mattia Chiesa | 2 | 0 | 0 | 0 | 0 | 0 | 0 | 0 | 0 | 2 | 0 | 0 |
| 4 | DF | (Italy) | Muguel Azzopardi | 1 | 0 | 0 | 0 | 0 | 0 | 0 | 0 | 0 | 1 | 0 | 0 |
| 8 | FW | (Italy) | Matthew Xuereb | 1 | 0 | 0 | 0 | 0 | 0 | 0 | 0 | 0 | 1 | 0 | 0 |
| 15 | FW | (Bosnia and Herzegovina) | Stipe Tokic | 1 | 0 | 0 | 0 | 0 | 0 | 0 | 0 | 0 | 1 | 0 | 0 |
| 3 | MF | (Malta) | Federico Galea | 1 | 0 | 0 | 0 | 0 | 0 | 0 | 0 | 0 | 1 | 0 | 0 |
| | | | Total | 32 | 1 | 1 | 0 | 0 | 0 | 0 | 0 | 0 | 32 | 1 | 1 |

Last updated: 21 November 2026
