= Jaap Stam =

Dutch footballer and manager (born 1972)

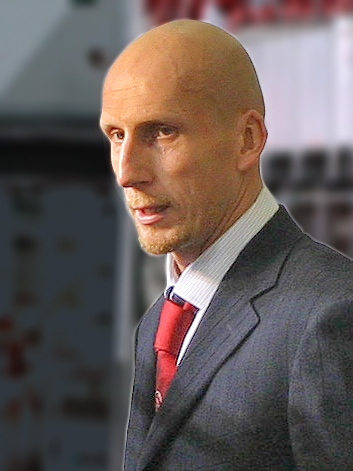
- Stam in 2006

Personal information
- Full name: Jakob Stam
- Date of birth: 17 July 1972 (age 54)
- Place of birth: Kampen, Netherlands
- Height: 1.91 m (6 ft 3 in)
- Position: Centre-back

Youth career
- 1988–1992: DOS Kampen

Senior career*
Years	Team	Apps	(Gls)
1992–1993	FC Zwolle	32	(1)
1993–1995	Cambuur	66	(3)
1995–1996	Willem II	19	(1)
1996–1998	PSV Eindhoven	76	(12)
1998–2001	Manchester United	79	(1)
2001–2004	Lazio	70	(3)
2004–2006	Milan	42	(1)
2006–2007	Ajax	31	(1)
Total		415	(23)

International career
1996–2004	Netherlands	67	(3)

Managerial career
- 2009: PEC Zwolle (caretaker)
- 2014–2016: Jong Ajax
- 2016–2018: Reading
- 2018–2019: PEC Zwolle
- 2019: Feyenoord
- 2020–2021: FC Cincinnati
- 2024–2025: DOS Kampen
- * Club domestic league appearances and goals

Jakob "Jaap" Stam (Dutch pronunciation: [jaːp ˈstɑm]; born 17 July 1972) is a Dutch professional football coach and former player. As a player, he played as a centre-back and is regarded as one of the best central defenders of all time. He was part of the Manchester United team that won the Treble of the Premier League, FA Cup and UEFA Champions League in 1999.

Stam played for several European clubs including PSV Eindhoven, Manchester United, Lazio, Milan and Ajax before retiring in October 2007. As well as winning numerous club trophies including an Eredivisie, a Coppa Italia, an Intercontinental Cup and three Premier League titles, he won several personal awards including being voted the best defender in both the 1998–99 and 1999–2000 UEFA Champions Leagues as well as being in three consecutive PFA Team of the Year sides from 1999 to 2001. Stam played 67 international matches for the Netherlands, scoring three goals. He was in their squads for three UEFA European Championships and the 1998 FIFA World Cup.

After retiring as a player, Stam worked as a coach at PEC Zwolle and Ajax. He later managed Feyenoord in 2019 and FC Cincinnati of Major League Soccer.

== Club career ==
=== Early career ===
Born in Kampen, Overijssel, Stam started his career with local amateur football club DOS Kampen. On 15 August 1992, Stam made his professional debut for FC Zwolle in a 1–1 draw against SC Heracles in the Eerste Divisie. He moved to Eredivisie club Cambuur for the following season, but was relegated in his first season. Two seasons at Cambuur earned him a transfer to Eredivisie club Willem II. At Willem II, he immediately impressed at the Eredivisie level, which meant his final breakthrough.

Stam transferred to PSV Eindhoven where he won the KNVB Cup in 1995–96, his first professional trophy. He won the 1996–97 Eredivisie, as well as the Johan Cruyff Shield. Individually, Stam won the VVCS Footballer of the Year award.

=== Manchester United ===
In April 1998, Stam became the then most expensive defender in history when Manchester United bought him on a five-year contract for £10.6 million. PSV initially valued him at £15 million, but accepted the lower offer after Stam waived his right to 15% of the fee.

Stam spent three seasons at Manchester United, during which time United won three Premier League titles, one FA Cup, the Intercontinental Cup and the UEFA Champions League. He scored his only goal for the club in a 6–2 away victory against Leicester City.

In the 1999 UEFA Champions League final, Stam's centre-back partner Ronny Johnsen conceded a free kick on the edge of the penalty area when he brought down Bayern Munich's Carsten Jancker in the first few minutes. Mario Basler scored the free kick and Bayern held the lead for 85 minutes before United scored two goals in added time to win the tournament.

Early in the 2001–02 season, Stam was controversially sold to Lazio in Italy after Manchester United manager Sir Alex Ferguson was reportedly upset by allegations Stam had made in his autobiography Head to Head about the club. Stam made numerous statements in the book about his views on opposing players, and alleged that Ferguson's approach to buy him was done without the permission of PSV. Later, Simon Kuper reported that, contrary to initial belief, Ferguson had noticed that Stam's tackling numbers were declining and simply assumed that the defender was past his playing peak. Laurent Blanc was signed as his replacement.

In 2007, however, Ferguson described the decision to sell Stam as an error: "At the time he had just come back from an achilles injury and we thought he had just lost a little bit. We got the offer from Lazio, £16.5m for a centre back who was 29. It was an offer I couldn't refuse. But in playing terms it was a mistake. He is still playing for Ajax at a really good level." On the financial report, Manchester United announced the fee was £15.3 million; Lazio declared the fee was £16 million.

=== Lazio ===
During his time with Lazio, Stam was found guilty of having the banned steroid nandrolone in his system following a Serie A game, and received a five-month ban, which was eventually reduced by a month after appeals. He was the second Lazio player suspended in 2001, after Fernando Couto.

In his last season at the club, he won the Coppa Italia.

=== AC Milan ===
Stam joined AC Milan after UEFA Euro 2004. He reached his second Champions League final with the Rossoneri in 2005, but was a runner-up after his team were defeated by Liverpool in a penalty shoot-out.

=== Ajax ===
On 30 January 2006, it was announced that he would return to the Eredivisie and play for Ajax, where he signed a two-year contract for a €2.5 million transfer fee. Stam was named as team captain upon his arrival at the club. In his first season, he won both the Johan Cruyff Shield and the KNVB Cup; another Johan Cruyff Shield was added to his trophies at the start of the 2007–08 season.

On 29 October 2007, Stam announced his retirement from professional football with immediate effect after playing six league games for Ajax in the 2007–08 league season. His final game was in a 0–0 draw against NEC on 28 October 2007.

== International career ==
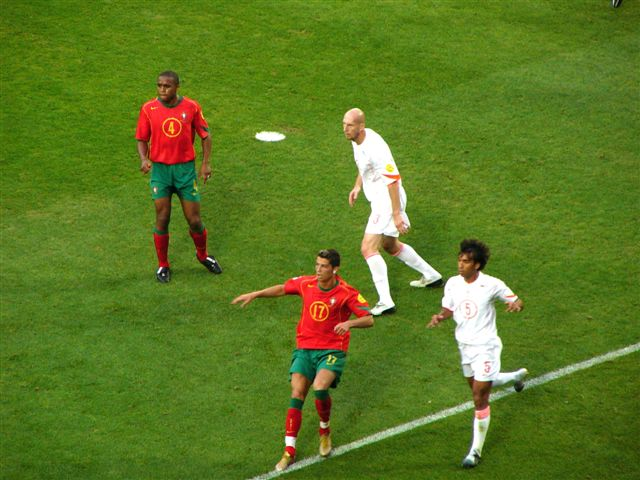
Stam (top center) with Jorge Andrade (left), Cristiano Ronaldo (bottom center) and Giovanni van Bronckhorst (right) during the Netherlands' Euro 2004 semi-final against Portugal. This was his final match for the country.

Stam made his debut for the Netherlands on 24 April 1996 in a 1–0 friendly defeat to Germany in Rotterdam. He was not initially chosen for UEFA Euro 1996, but was later added to the squad after an injury ruled out Frank de Boer; he did not however make any appearances at the tournament. He scored his first goal on 6 September 1997 in a 3–1 home win over rivals Belgium in World Cup qualification. He was also an important player in the Dutch team that finished fourth in the 1998 FIFA World Cup.

During UEFA Euro 2000, he once again reached the semi-finals with the Dutch team, hosted in his home country and Belgium. Stam missed his attempt in the penalty shoot-out in the semi-finals, hitting the ball over the bar in a defeat against Italy. He was not originally scheduled to take a penalty, but had to due to substitutions and fatigue among his teammates.

Stam reached his third semi-finals in an international competition with his nation at UEFA Euro 2004 in Portugal and retired from international football after the tournament. The reason cited for his international retirement was that he wanted to focus on his new team, Milan, as well as his family.

In total, he played 67 matches for the Netherlands, scoring three goals.

== Style of play ==
Considered by several pundits to be one of the best defenders of his generation, as well as one of the greatest Dutch and Premier League defenders in history, Stam played primarily as a centre-back. He was known for possessing "a rare combination of speed, strength and ball-playing ability", as well as an excellent positional sense and a powerful shot. Due to his wide range of skills, in his prime he was also capable of playing as a full-back on the right flank.

== Post-playing career ==
In October 2008, Stam returned to Manchester United as a scout for the club, responsible for most of South America.

=== Soccer Aid ===
Stam has been involved with Soccer Aid, which puts celebrities and football legends together in two teams (England and Rest of the World) for a charity game in aid of UNICEF. Stam has appeared in five Soccer Aid matches 2008, 2012, 2014, 2016 and 2018.

== Coaching and managerial career ==
In 2009, Stam became an assistant coach for PEC Zwolle, and on 30 October was appointed caretaker manager. Following his stint with Zwolle, Stam signed on for a three-year contract with Ajax in 2013 as an assistant coach, and as a defensive coach starting in the 2013–14 Eredivisie season. On 28 May 2014, Stam was revealed as one of the new managers of Jong Ajax, the reserve team in the Eerste Divisie. He was joined by Andries Ulderink and they signed a contract beginning on 1 July 2014 and lasting until 30 June 2016.

=== Reading ===
On 13 June 2016, Stam was appointed as manager of English Championship club Reading on an initial two-year contract. He enjoyed a successful first season with the club, leading them to the Championship play-offs. On 4 July 2017, Stam signed a new two-year contract extension with Reading, keeping him at the club until 2019. On 21 March 2018, Reading announced that Stam had left the club with immediate effect following a run of one win in 18 league matches left the team 20th in the league table.

=== PEC Zwolle ===
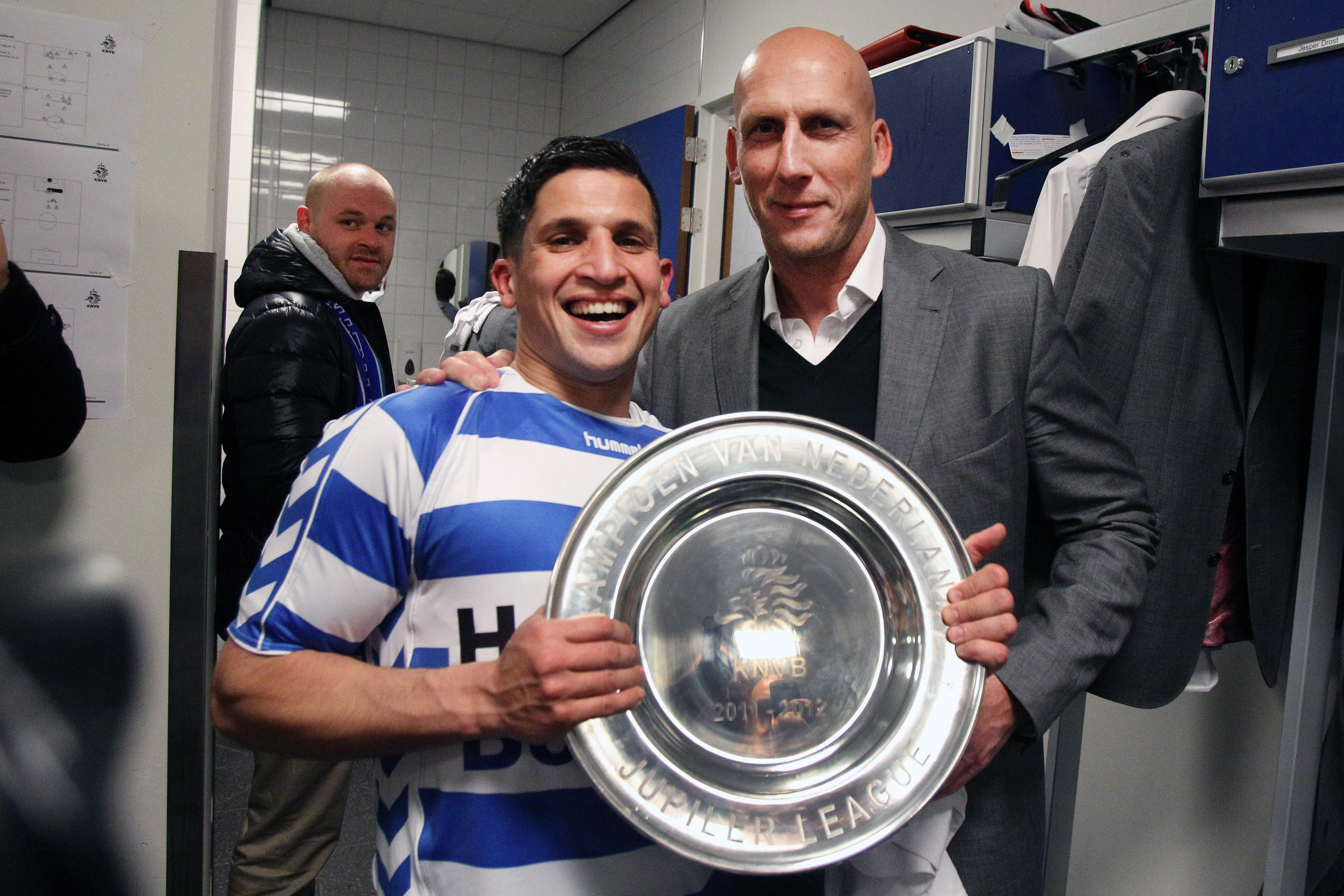
Stam (right) during his period with PEC Zwolle

On 28 December 2018, Stam was appointed as the new manager of Eredivisie club PEC Zwolle on a year-and-a-half contract.

=== Feyenoord ===
On 6 March 2019, Feyenoord announced that Stam would succeed Giovanni van Bronckhorst as Feyenoord's new manager. He signed a two-year contract, effective 1 June 2019. Following a 0–4 defeat to Ajax, Stam resigned on 28 October 2019, saying: "I've thought about this for a long time. My final conclusion is that it's better for the club, the players and myself if I step aside."

=== FC Cincinnati ===
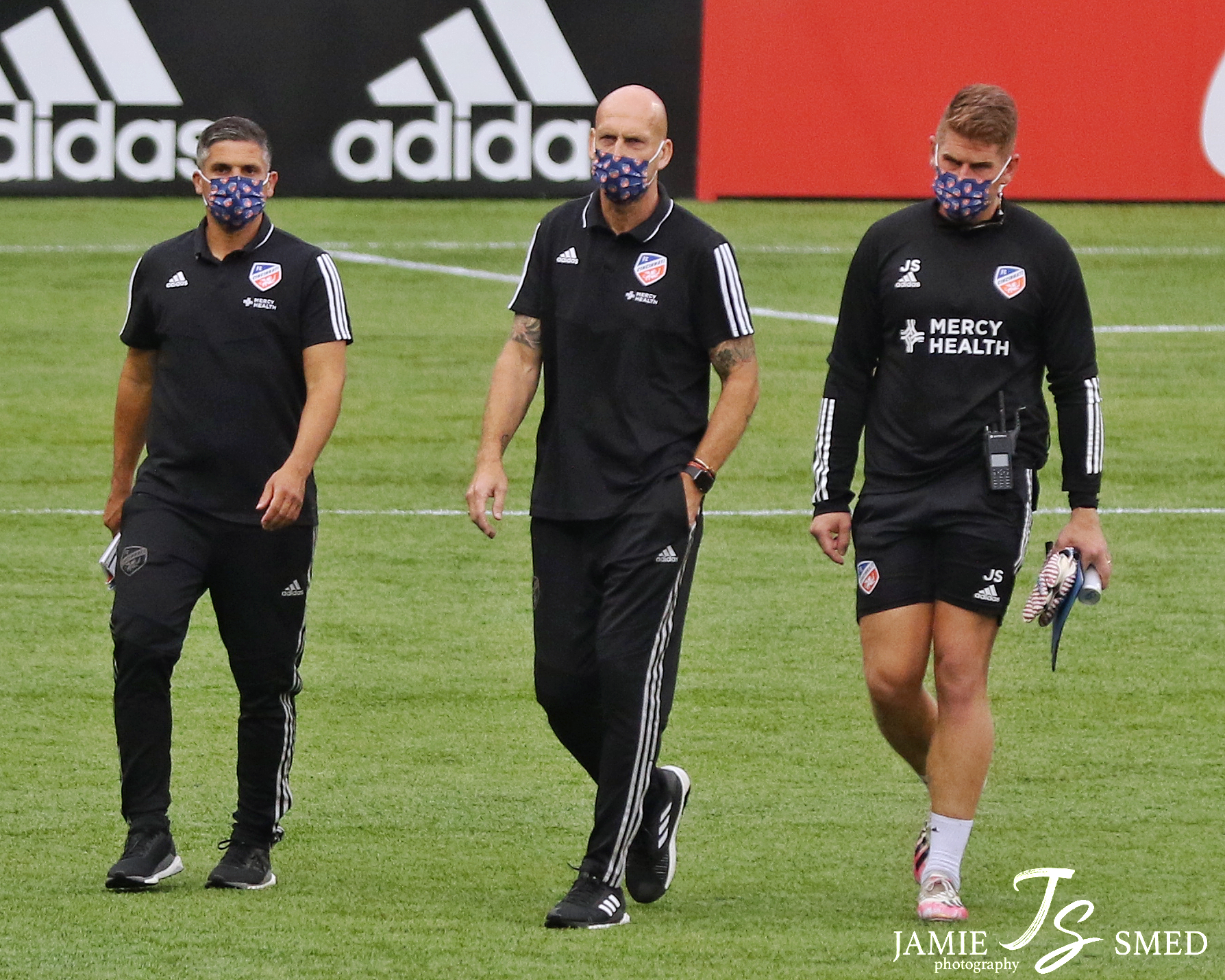
Stam (centre) with FC Cincinnati in August 2020

On 21 May 2020, Major League Soccer club FC Cincinnati announced that Stam would succeed interim manager Yoann Damet. He signed a year-and-a-half contract. On 15 July, he won 1–0 on his debut against an Atlanta United side managed by his former international teammate Frank de Boer.

Stam was dismissed on 27 September 2021, with Cincinnati second-from-bottom in the Eastern Conference, having won four of 25 games.

=== DOS Kampen ===
In February 2024, Stam was appointed manager at seventh-tier DOS Kampen, his hometown amateur club where he had begun playing more than three decades earlier. He agreed to take charge in the summer, on a one-year contract.

== Personal life ==
Stam is a Protestant. He met his wife Ellis when he was 16, and they have two daughters and twin sons. His first daughter's birth was induced two weeks early, to come between the 1998 World Cup and pre-season training for Manchester United. When he played for Manchester United, he lived in Wilmslow in Cheshire. His cousin Maurice van Ham was also a professional footballer.

== Career statistics ==
=== Club ===
Appearances and goals by club, season and competition
Club	Season	League			National cup (Note: Includes KNVB Cup, FA Cup, Coppa Italia)		League cup		Europe		Other		Total	
Club	Season	Division	Apps	Goals	Apps	Goals	Apps	Goals	Apps	Goals	Apps	Goals	Apps	Goals
Zwolle	1992–93	Eerste Divisie	32	1			—		—		—		32	1
Cambuur	1993–94	Eredivisie	33	1			—		—		—		33	1
Cambuur	1994–95	Eerste Divisie	33	2			—		—		—		33	2
Cambuur	Total		66	3			—		—		—		66	3
Willem II	1995–96	Eredivisie	19	1			—		—		—		19	1
PSV Eindhoven	1995–96	Eredivisie	14	1	4	0	—		—		—		18	1
PSV Eindhoven	1996–97	Eredivisie	33	7	2	0	—		4 (Note: Appearances in UEFA Cup Winners' Cup)	0	1 (Note: Appearance in Johan Cruyff Shield)	0	40	7
PSV Eindhoven	1997–98	Eredivisie	29	4	5	0	—		5 (Note: Appearances in UEFA Champions League)	0	1	0	40	4
PSV Eindhoven	Total		76	12	11	0	—		9	0	2	0	98	12
Manchester United	1998–99	Premier League	30	1	7	0	0	0	13	0	1 (Note: Appearance in FA Charity Shield)	0	51	1
Manchester United	1999–2000	Premier League	33	0	—		0	0	13	0	5 (Note: One appearance in FA Charity Shield, one appearance in UEFA Super Cup, one appearance in Intercontinental Cup, two appearances in FIFA Club World Championship)	0	51	0
Manchester United	2000–01	Premier League	15	0	1	0	0	0	6	0	1	0	23	0
Manchester United	2001–02	Premier League	1	0	0	0	0	0	0	0	1	0	2	0
Manchester United	Total		79	1	8	0	0	0	32	0	8	0	127	1
Lazio	2001–02	Serie A	13	1	—		—		5	0	—		18	1
Lazio	2002–03	Serie A	28	0	2	0	—		4 (Note: Appearances in UEFA Cup)	0	—		34	0
Lazio	2003–04	Serie A	29	2	6	0	—		7	1	—		42	3
Lazio	Total		70	3	8	0	—		16	1	—		94	4
Milan	2004–05	Serie A	17	0	2	0	—		8	1	1 (Note: Appearance in Supercoppa Italiana)	0	28	1
Milan	2005–06	Serie A	25	1	3	0	—		9	0	—		37	1
Milan	Total		42	1	5	0	—		17	1	1	0	65	2
Ajax	2006–07	Eredivisie	25	1	4	1	—		11 (Note: Four appearances in UEFA Champions League, seven appearances in UEFA Cup)	0	1	0	41	2
Ajax	2007–08	Eredivisie	6	0	—		—		4	0	1	0	11	0
Ajax	Total		31	1	4	1	—		15	0	2	0	52	2
Career total			415	23	36	1	0	0	89	2	13	0	553	26

=== International ===
Appearances and goals by national team and year

National team	Year	Apps	Goals
Netherlands	1996	4	0
Netherlands	1997	6	1
Netherlands	1998	14	1
Netherlands	1999	4	1
Netherlands	2000	8	0
Netherlands	2001	7	0
Netherlands	2002	5	0
Netherlands	2003	9	0
Netherlands	2004	10	0
Total		67	3

International goals

(Source)

Scores and results list Netherlands' goal tally first.

Goal	Date	Venue	Opponent	Score	Result	Competition
1.	6 September 1997	De Kuip, Rotterdam, Netherlands	Belgium	1–0	3–1	1998 FIFA World Cup qualification
2.	10 October 1998	Philips Stadion, Eindhoven, Netherlands	Peru	1–0	2–0	Friendly
3.	13 November 1999	Philips Stadion, Eindhoven, Netherlands	Czech Republic	1–1	1–1	Friendly

=== Managerial record ===
As of match played 26 September 2021

Managerial record by team and tenure
Team	From	To	Record					Ref
Team	From	To	P	W	D	L	Win %	Ref
Reading	13 June 2016	21 March 2018	98	40	23	35	40.8	
PEC Zwolle	28 December 2018	31 May 2019	17	7	3	7	41.2	
Feyenoord	1 June 2019	28 October 2019	18	7	6	5	38.9	
FC Cincinnati	21 May 2020	27 September 2021	47	8	13	26	17.0	
Total			180	62	45	73	34.4	

*Some of Stam's record comes from the MLS is Back tournament. However, the tournament is essentially the MLS 2020 season.

== Honours ==
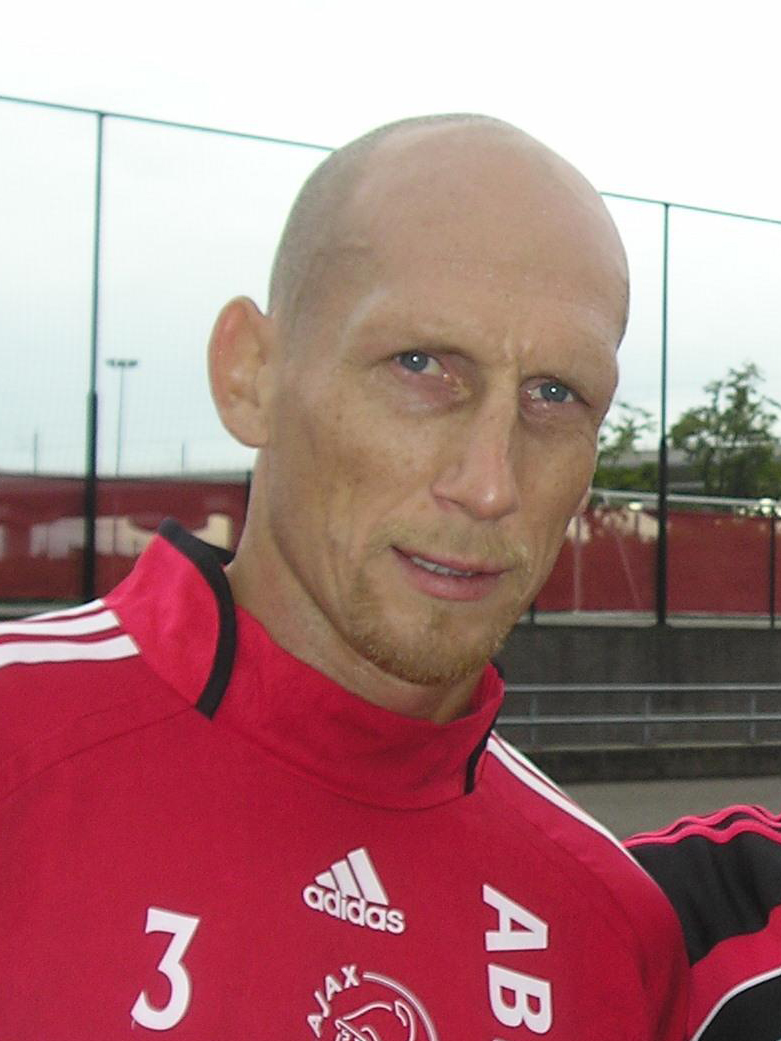
Stam with Ajax in 2010

PSV

- Eredivisie: 1996–97
- KNVB Cup: 1995–96
- Johan Cruyff Shield: 1996, 1997

Manchester United

- Premier League: 1998–99, 1999–2000, 2000–01
- FA Cup: 1998–99
- UEFA Champions League: 1998–99
- Intercontinental Cup: 1999

Lazio

- Coppa Italia: 2003–04

Milan

- Supercoppa Italiana: 2004
- UEFA Champions League runner-up: 2004–05

Ajax

- KNVB Cup: 2006–07
- Johan Cruyff Shield: 2006, 2007

Individual

- Dutch Footballer of the Year: 1997
- Dutch Golden Boot: 1997
- UEFA Club Best Defender of the Year: 1998–99, 1999–2000
- PFA Team of the Year: 1998–99 Premier League, 1999–2000 Premier League, 2000–01 Premier League
- ESM Team of the Year: 1998–99
- Overseas Team of the Decade – Premier League 10 Seasons Awards (1992–93 – 2001–02)

== Books ==
- Stam, J., with Butler, J. (contrib.) (2002), Head to Head, Willow Publishing, ISBN 978-0-00-711709-3
