= Daishawn Redan =

Dutch footballer (born 2001)

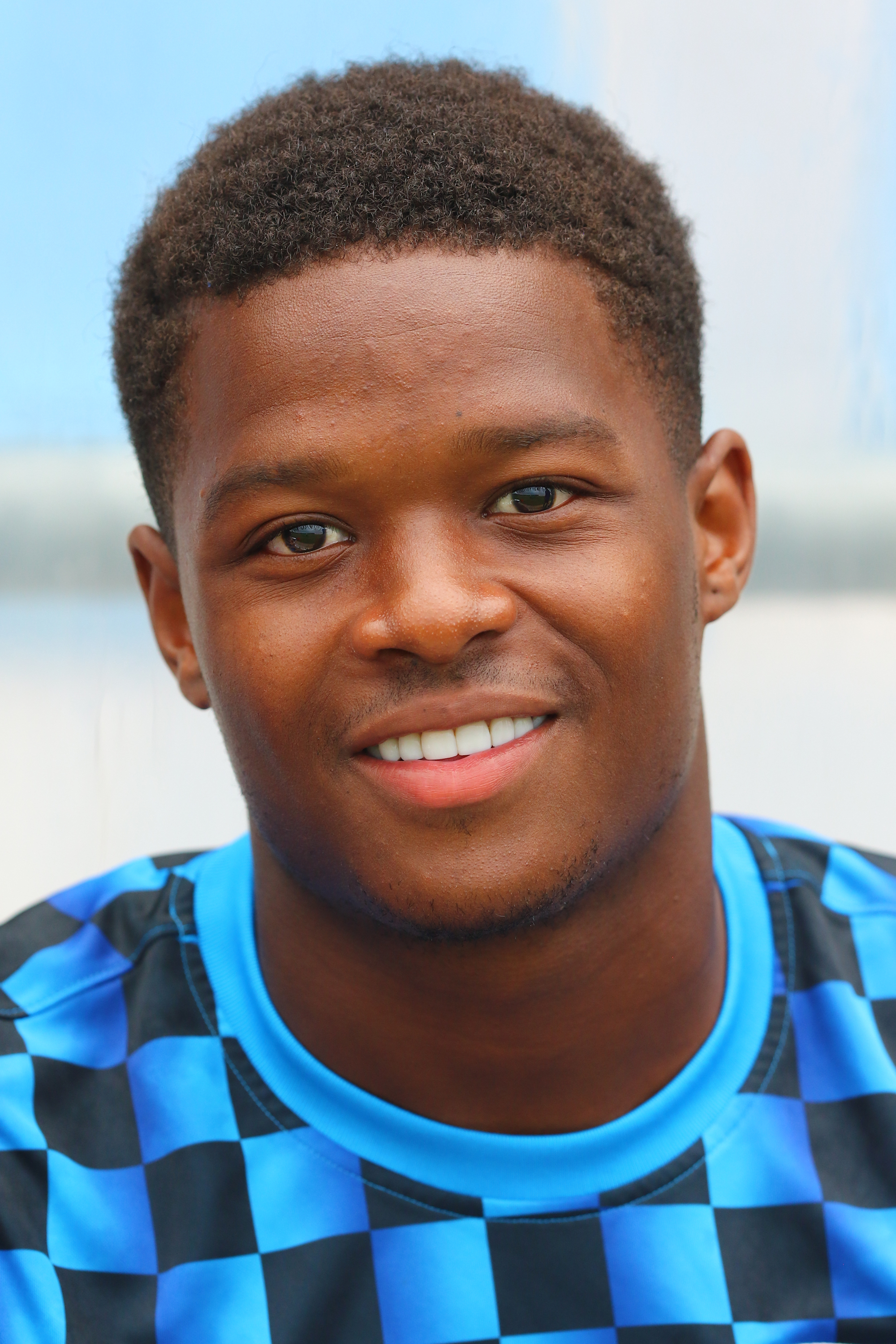
- Redan in 2019

Personal information
- Full name: Daishawn Orpheo Marvin Redan
- Date of birth: 2 February 2001 (age 25)
- Place of birth: Amsterdam, Netherlands
- Height: 1.76 m (5 ft 9 in)
- Position: Forward

Team information
- Current team: Birżebbuġa St. Peter's
- Number: 9

Youth career
- –2008: ASV DWV
- 2008–2017: Ajax
- 2017–2019: Chelsea

Senior career*
Years	Team	Apps	(Gls)
2019–2023	Hertha BSC	8	(0)
2019–2021	Hertha BSC II	13	(5)
2020	→ Groningen (loan)	5	(0)
2021–2022	→ PEC Zwolle (loan)	26	(6)
2022–2023	→ Utrecht (loan)	14	(1)
2022–2023	→ Jong Utrecht (loan)	2	(0)
2023–2024	Venezia	0	(0)
2023–2024	→ Triestina (loan)	33	(11)
2024–2026	Avellino	20	(3)
2025	→ Beerschot (loan)	6	(3)
2025	→ Lokeren (loan)	0	(0)
2026–	Birżebbuġa St. Peter's	0	(0)

International career^{‡}
2014–2015	Netherlands U15	5	(3)
2015–2016	Netherlands U16	12	(10)
2016–2018	Netherlands U17	25	(20)
2018–2019	Netherlands U19	14	(12)
2019–2023	Netherlands U21	9	(4)
Medal record
Representing Netherlands
UEFA European Under-17 Championship
Winner	England 2018	U-17 Team
- * Club domestic league appearances and goals as of 27 December 2025 ‡ National team caps and goals as of 11:18, 27 June 2022 (UTC)

Daishawn Orpheo Marvin Redan (born 2 February 2001) is a Dutch professional footballer who plays as a forward.

== Club career ==
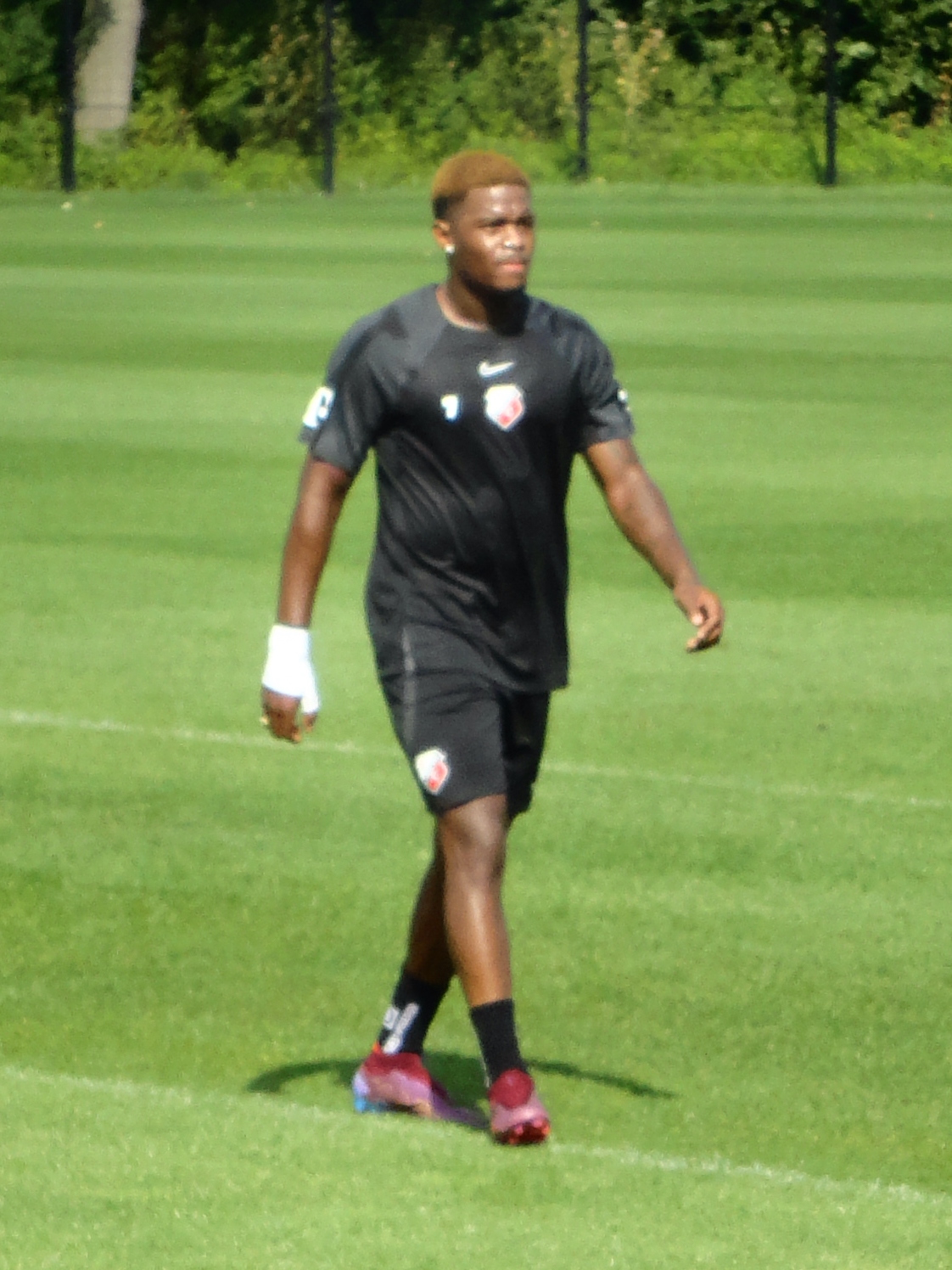
Redan with FC Utrecht in 2022

Redan made his professional debut for Hertha BSC in the Bundesliga on 25 August 2019, coming on as a substitute for Salomon Kalou in the 70th minute of the home match against VfL Wolfsburg, which finished as a 3–0 loss.

In the January 2020 transfer window, he was loaned to Dutch Eredivisie side FC Groningen for six months.

On 31 August 2021, he was loaned for the season by PEC Zwolle.

On 27 June 2022, Redan extended his contract with Hertha BSC and then joined Utrecht on a season-long loan deal with an option to buy.

On 31 January 2023, Redan signed a three-and-a-half-year contract with Venezia in Italy. He only appeared for the Under-19 squad in the second half of the 2022–23 season. On 21 July 2023, he was loaned to Triestina.

On 12 August 2024, Redan signed a four-year contract with Avellino in Serie C. On 3 February 2025, Redan moved on loan to Beerschot in Belgium, with an option to buy. On 8 September 2025, Redan returned to Belgium on a new loan and joined Lokeren in Challenger Pro League. On 12 December 2025, the loan to Lokeren was terminated by the agreement of all parties. On 7 January 2026, Redan's contract with Avellino was mutually terminated as well.

On 4 August 2026 he signed for Birżebbuġa St. Peter's.

== International career ==
In the 2018 UEFA European Under-17 Championship, Redan was a starter and captain for the Netherlands U17 team, scoring three goals as they won the tournament by defeating Italy U17 in the final. Redan became all-time top goalscorer for the Netherlands U17 at his final game, having scored 20 goals in 25 appearances.

With the Netherlands U19 team, Redan made a notable impression on 13 October 2018, by scoring four goals in a decisive 6–0 victory against Bosnia and Herzegovina U19.

On 10 September 2019, he made his debut for the Netherlands under-21 team against Cyprus U21, providing an assist in a 5–1 victory. In his second appearance on 14 November 2019, against Gibraltar U21, he scored his first goal as the Netherlands under-21s won 6–0.

== Personal life ==
Redan was born in Amsterdam, and is of Surinamese descent.

== Career statistics ==
As of 30 June 2024

Appearances and goals by club, season and competition
Club	Season	League			Cup		Continental		Other		Total	
Club	Season	Division	Apps	Goals	Apps	Goals	Apps	Goals	Apps	Goals	Apps	Goals
Hertha BSC	2019–20	Bundesliga	1	0	0	0	—		—		1	0
Hertha BSC	2020–21	Bundesliga	7	0	0	0	—		—		7	0
Hertha BSC	2021–22	Bundesliga	0	0	0	0	—		—		0	0
Hertha BSC	Total		8	0	0	0	—		—		8	0
Hertha BSC II	2019–20	Regionalliga	8	4	—		—		—		8	4
Hertha BSC II	2020–21	Regionalliga	3	1	—		—		—		3	1
Hertha BSC II	2021–22	Regionalliga	2	0	—		—		—		2	0
Hertha BSC II	Total		13	5	—		—		—		13	5
Groningen (loan)	2019–20	Eredivisie	5	0	—		—		—		5	0
PEC Zwolle (loan)	2021–22	Eredivisie	26	6	2	0	—		—		26	6
Utrecht (loan)	2022–23	Eredivisie	14	1	1	0	—		—		15	1
Venezia	2022–23	Serie B	0	0	—		—		—		0	0
Triestina (loan)	2023–24	Serie C	33	11	2	0	—		—		35	11
Birżebbuġa St. Peter's	2026–27	Maltese Premier League	0	0	0	0	0	0	0	0	0	0
Career total			99	23	5	0	0	0	0	0	104	23

== Honours ==
Netherlands U17

- UEFA European Under-17 Championship: 2018

Individual

- Eredivisie Talent of the Month: February 2022
- Eredivisie Team of the Month: February 2022,

Records

- Top goalscorer in Netherlands U17 history: 20
