= Jasper Schendelaar =

Dutch footballer (born 2000)

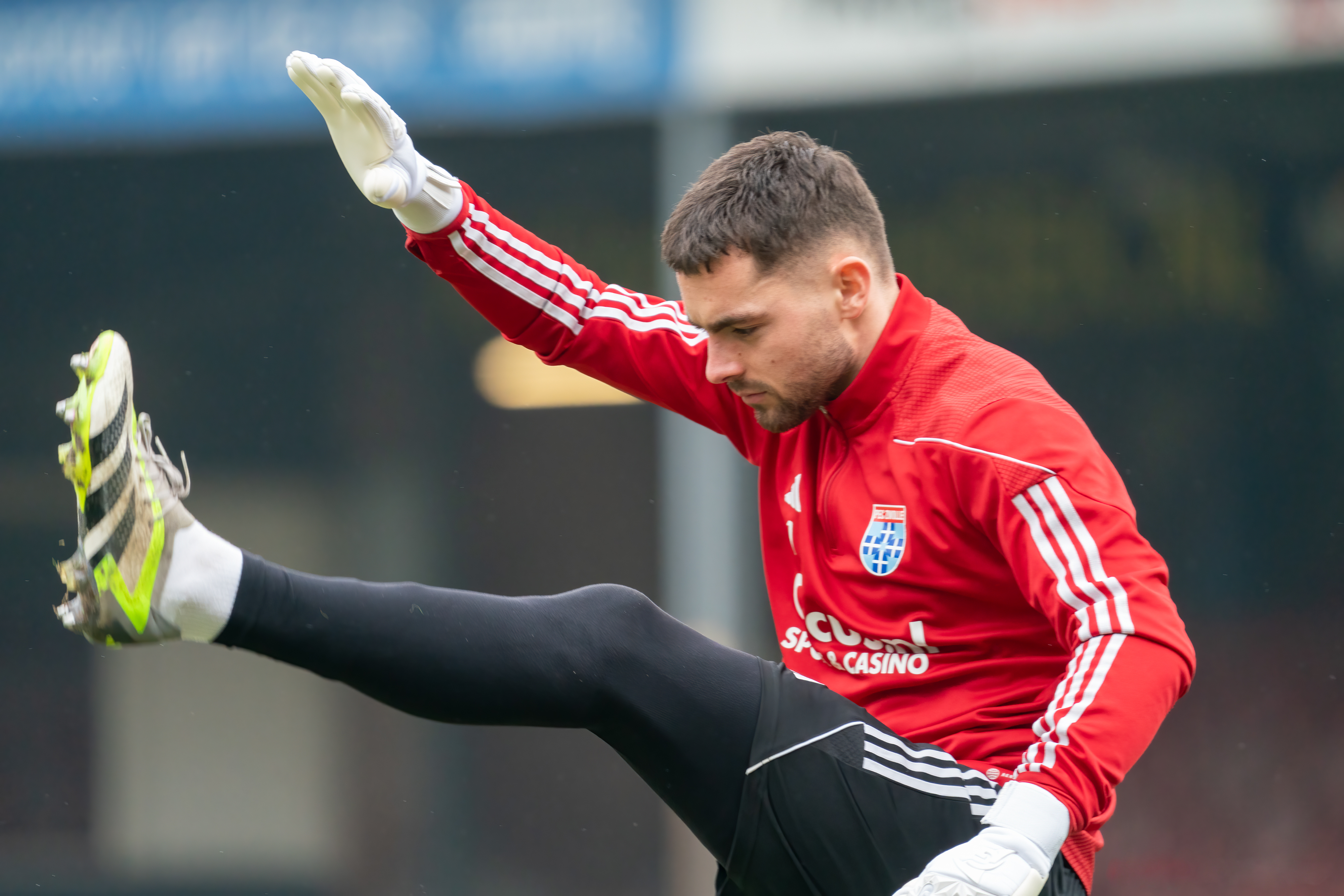
- Schendelaar with PEC Zwolle in 2024

Personal information
- Date of birth: 2 September 2000 (age 26)
- Place of birth: Alkmaar, Netherlands
- Height: 1.86 m (6 ft 1 in)
- Position: Goalkeeper

Team information
- Current team: PEC Zwolle
- Number: 1

Youth career
- VAVV Alcmaria Victrix
- –2013: SV De Foresters
- 2013–2018: AZ Alkmaar

Senior career*
Years	Team	Apps	(Gls)
2017–2021	Jong AZ	34	(0)
2017–2021	AZ	0	(0)
2020–2021	→ Telstar (loan)	36	(0)
2021–	PEC Zwolle	101	(0)

International career^{‡}
2014–2015	Netherlands U15	5	(0)
2015–2016	Netherlands U16	10	(0)
2016–2017	Netherlands U17	12	(0)
2017	Netherlands U18	2	(0)
2018–2019	Netherlands U19	3	(0)
- * Club domestic league appearances and goals as of 21 May 2026 ‡ National team caps and goals as of 23 December 2019

Jasper Schendelaar (born 2 September 2000) is a Dutch professional footballer who plays as a goalkeeper for Eredivisie club PEC Zwolle.

== Club career ==
Schendelaar made his Eerste Divisie debut for Jong AZ on 24 August 2018 in a game against Cambuur, as a starter.

On 8 June 2020, AZ agreed to loan out Schendelaar to SC Telstar for the 2020–21 season.

On 12 June 2021, he signed a two-year contract with PEC Zwolle. A backup to Kostas Lamprou during his first season at the club, Schendelaar was chosen as the new starter in goal ahead of the 2022–23 season. He made his debut for the club on 7 August 2022, the first matchday of the season, in a 2–1 win against De Graafschap.

== International career ==
He was the starting goalkeeper for Netherlands national under-17 football team at the 2017 UEFA European Under-17 Championship, as Netherlands were eliminated by Germany in the quarterfinal.

== Career statistics ==
As of match played 25 October 2025

Appearances and goals by club, season and competition
Club	Season	League			Cup		Europe		Other		Total	
Club	Season	Division	Apps	Goals	Apps	Goals	Apps	Goals	Apps	Goals	Apps	Goals
Jong AZ	2017–18	Eerste Divisie	0	0	—		—		—		16	6
Jong AZ	2018–19	Eerste Divisie	24	0	—		—		—		9	3
Jong AZ	2019–20	Eerste Divisie	10	0	—		—		—		9	4
Jong AZ	Total		34	0	—		—		—		34	0
AZ	2018–19	Eredivisie	0	0	0	0	0	0	—		0	0
AZ	2019–20	Eredivisie	0	0	0	0	0	0	—		0	0
AZ	Total		0	0	0	0	0	0	—		0	0
Telstar (loan)	2020–21	Eerste Divisie	36	0	1	0	—		—		37	0
PEC Zwolle	2021–22	Eredivisie	0	0	0	0	—		—		0	0
PEC Zwolle	2022–23	Eerste Divisie	37	0	0	0	—		—		37	0
PEC Zwolle	2023–24	Eredivisie	32	0	0	0	—		—		32	0
PEC Zwolle	2024–25	Eredivisie	30	0	1	0	—		—		31	0
PEC Zwolle	2025–26	Eredivisie	2	0	0	0	—		—		2	0
PEC Zwolle	Total		101	0	1	0	—		—		102	0
Career total			171	0	2	0	0	0	0	0	173	0

== Honours ==
Individual

- Eredivisie Team of the Month: September 2024, December 2024
