= Alex Bruno (footballer, born 1993) =

Brazilian footballer

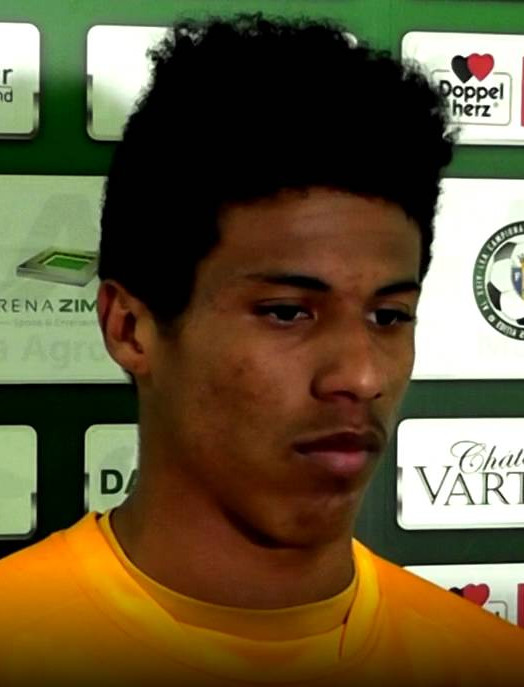
- Bruno with Zimbru Chișinău in 2016

Personal information
- Full name: Alex Bruno de Souza Silva
- Date of birth: 7 October 1993 (age 33)
- Place of birth: Queimados, Brazil
- Height: 1.69 m (5 ft 7 in)
- Position: Winger

Team information
- Current team: Hibernians
- Number: 21

Youth career
- 2009: Botafogo
- 2010: União Central
- 2011: Queimados

Senior career*
Years	Team	Apps	(Gls)
2012–2014	Widzew Łódź	44	(4)
2015	Santa Rita	7	(0)
2015–2016	Zimbru Chișinău	32	(5)
2017	Gyeongnam	32	(0)
2018	Suwon FC	21	(1)
2019	Londrina	0	(0)
2019–2022	Atyrau	33	(2)
2022	Maktaaral	21	(1)
2023–2026	Hibernians	52	(8)
2026	Birżebbuġa St. Peter's	11	(3)
- * Club domestic league appearances and goals as of 7 November 2026

Alex Bruno de Souza Silva (born 7 October 1993), known as Alex Bruno, is a Brazilian professional footballer who plays as a winger for Maltese club Birżebbuġa St. Peter's Birżebbuġa St. Peter's.

== Career statistics ==
As of match played 25 July 2026

Appearances and goals by club, season and competition
Club	Season	League			Cup		Europe		Other		Total	
Club	Season	Division	Apps	Goals	Apps	Goals	Apps	Goals	Apps	Goals	Apps	Goals
Birżebbuġa St. Peter's	2026–27	Maltese Premier League	11	3	0	0	0	0	0	0	11	3
Career total			11	3	0	0	0	0	0	0	11	3
