= Maurice van Ham =

Dutch footballer (born 1966)

Personal information
- Date of birth: 25 April 1966 (age 60)
- Place of birth: Netherlands
- Position: Midfielder

Senior career*
Years	Team	Apps	(Gls)
1985–1989	AZ	51	(3)
1990–1997	KSK Beveren	125	(12)
1995–1996	→ PAOK (loan)	37	(8)
1997–1999	Charleroi	46	(3)
1999–2002	Wiltz		
2002–2004	AFC '34		
- * Club domestic league appearances and goals

Maurice van Ham (born 25 April 1966) is a Dutch former footballer who played as a midfielder.

== Early life ==
Van Ham was born in 1966 in the Netherlands. He is a native of North Holland, the Netherlands.

== Career ==
Van Ham started his career with Dutch side AZ. He was regarded as a fan favorite while playing for the club. In 1990, he signed for Belgian side KSK Beveren. In 1995, he was sent on loan to Greek side PAOK. In 1997, he signed for Belgian side Charleroi. In 1999, he signed for Luxembourgish side Wiltz. In 2002, he signed for Dutch side AFC '34.

== Personal life ==
Van Ham was nicknamed the "white Brazilian" by Netherlands international Johan Boskamp. He is the cousin of Netherlands international Jaap Stam.
