= Juan Bolaños =

Colombian footballer (born 1994)

Personal information
- Full name: Juan Andrés Bolaños Ramírez
- Date of birth: 22 July 1991 (age 35)
- Place of birth: Villavicencio, Colombia
- Height: 1.89 m (6 ft 2 in)
- Position: Defender

Team information
- Current team: Birżebbuġa St. Peter's
- Number: 25

Senior career*
Years	Team	Apps	(Gls)
2009–2011	Academia	29	(0)
2012	Godoy Cruz	0	(0)
2013–2015	Tianjin Quanjian	45	(2)
2016	Melgar	5	(0)
2018–2019	Platense	57	(2)
2019–2023	Gudja United	68	(3)
2023–2024	Valletta	16	(0)
2024–2025	Flamurtari	27	(0)
2026–	Birżebbuġa St. Peter's	21	(1)

International career
2010	Colombia U20	2	(0)
- * Club domestic league appearances and goals as of 7 November 2026

Juan Andrés Bolaños Ramírez (born 20 January 1994) is a Colombian footballer who currently plays as a forward for Birżebbuġa St. Peter's.

== Career statistics ==
=== Club ===
As of Federico Galea

Club	Season	League			Cup		Continental		Other		Total	
Club	Season	Division	Apps	Goals	Apps	Goals	Apps	Goals	Apps	Goals	Apps	Goals
Academia	2009	Categoría Primera B	9	0	5 (Note: Appearances in the Copa Colombia)	0	–		0	0	14	0
Academia	2010	Categoría Primera B	11	0	6	0	–		0	0	17	0
Academia	2011	Categoría Primera B	9	0	6	0	–		0	0	15	0
Academia	Total		29	0	17	0	0	0	0	0	46	0
Godoy Cruz	2012–13	Argentine Primera División	0	0	0	0	0	0	0	0	0	0
Tianjin Quanjian	2014	China League One	16	0	0	0	–		0	0	16	0
Tianjin Quanjian	2015	China League One	29	2	0	0	–		0	0	29	2
Tianjin Quanjian	Total		45	2	0	0	0	0	0	0	45	2
Melgar	2016	Peruvian Primera División	5	0	0	0	5 (Note: Appearances in the Copa Libertadores)	0	0	0	10	0
Platense	2017–18	Liga Salva Vida	16	0	0	0	0	0	0	0	16	0
Platense	2018–19	Liga Salva Vida	41	2	0	0	0	0	0	0	41	2
Platense	Total		57	2	0	0	0	0	0	0	57	2
Gudja United	2019–20	Maltese Premier League	19	3	2 (Note: Appearances in the Maltese FA Trophy)	0	–		0	0	21	3
Gudja United	2020–21	Maltese Premier League	20	1	1	0	0	0	0	0	21	1
Gudja United	2021–22	Maltese Premier League	9	0	2	0	0	0	5	0	16	0
Gudja United	2022–23	Maltese Premier League	20	0	3	0	0	0	0	0	23	0
Valletta	2024–25	Maltese Premier League	16	0	1	0	0	0	0	0	17	0
Flamurtari	2024–25	Kategoria e Parë	27	0	2	0	0	0	0	0	29	0
Birżebbuġa St. Peter's	2025–26	Maltese Challenge League	14	0	8	0	0	0	8	0	30	0
Birżebbuġa St. Peter's	2026–27	Maltese Premier League	10	1	0	0	0	0	0	0	10	1
Career total			185	9	20	0	5	0	0	0	200	9

== Honours ==
Birżebbuġa St. Peter's

- National Amateur Super Cupː 2025-26

Platense

- Honduran Cupː 2018
