= Yuri Messias =

Brazilian footballer

Personal information
- Full name: Yuri de Jesus Messias
- Date of birth: 11 September 1991 (age 35)
- Place of birth: Rio de Janeiro, Brazil
- Height: 1.69 m (5 ft 6 1/2 in)
- Position: Forward

Youth career
- Boavista

Senior career*
Years	Team	Apps	(Gls)
2011	Boavista	0	(0)
2012	Imperial		
2013	Paraíba	4	(0)
2013–2014	Mosta	16	(3)
2014–2016	Msida Saint-Joseph	7	(4)
2016–2018	Naxxar Lions	46	(31)
2018	Nadur Youngsters	0	(0)
2019	Al-Jabalain		
2019–2020	Valletta	6	(1)
2020	União Frederiquense	2	(1)
2020–2021	Gudja United	14	(13)
2021	East Riffa		
2021–2022	Gżira United	16	(6)
2022–2023	East Riffa		
2023–2025	Marsaxlokk	57	(25)
2025–2026	Valletta	31	(12)
2026	Birżebbuġa St. Peter's	12	(1)
- * Club domestic league appearances and goals as of 18 November 2026

Yuri de Jesus Messias (born 11 September 1991) is a Brazilian footballer who currently plays for Maltese club Birżebbuġa St. Peter's.

== Club career ==
On 1 August 2014 he signed for Msida Saint-Joseph.

On 25 June 2025 he signed for Valletta, here he won the Maltese FA Trophy, but after he left the club.

On 4 June 2026, he signed for Birżebbuġa St. Peter's in Premier League. On 18 November 2026, after 12 matches and one goal, his contract was terminated by mutual agreement between the parties.

== Career statistics ==
=== Club ===
As of 18 November 2026

Club	Season	League			Cup		Europe		Other		Total	
Club	Season	Division	Apps	Goals	Apps	Goals	Apps	Goals	Apps	Goals	Apps	Goals
Boavista	2011	Campeonato Carioca	1 (Note: Appearances in the Copa Rio)	0	0	0	0	0	1	0		
Paraíba	2013	–			0	0	4 (Note: Appearances in the Campeonato Paraibano)	0	0	0	4	0
Mosta	2013–14	Maltese Premier League	16	3	1 (Note: Appearances in the Maltese FA Trophy)	0	0	0	0	0	17	3
Naxxar Lions	2017–18	Maltese Premier League	20	8	2	1	0	0	0	0	22	9
Birżebbuġa St. Peter's	2026–27	Maltese Premier League	12	1	0	0	0	0	0	0	12	1
Career total			48	12	4	1	4	0	0	0	66	13

== Honours ==
Valletta

- Maltese FA Trophyː 2025-26
- Maltese Super Cupː 2019

Marsaxlokk

- Maltese FA Trophyː Runner-Up 2022–23

Individual

- Maltese Premier League top scorer: 2023–24 (shared with Joseph Mbong)
