= Elikia Mbinga =

Dutch footballer

Personal information
- Full name: Elikia Joël Mbinga
- Date of birth: 8 March 2001 (age 25)
- Position: Midfielder

Team information
- Current team: VVOG
- Number: 25

Youth career
- PEC Zwolle
- 2017–2021: Ajax

Senior career*
Years	Team	Apps	(Gls)
2021–2023	PEC Zwolle	5	(0)
2023–	VVOG	8	(2)
- * Club domestic league appearances and goals as of 17:01, 21 November 2024 (UTC)

Elikia Joël Mbinga (born 8 March 2001) is a Dutch musician and footballer who plays as a midfielder for VVOG.

== Football career ==
Mbinga started his career with PEC Zwolle, before spending four years with Ajax. He returned to Zwolle where he made his professional debut in September 2021, against Ajax.

On 2 January 2023, Mbinga signed a one-and-a-half-year contract with fourth-tier Derde Divisie club VVOG.

== Music career ==
Mbinga is also an afrobeats musician, and as of November 2026 had 500,000 monthly Spotify listeners.
