= Mattia Chiesa =

Italian footballer (born 2000)

Personal information
- Date of birth: 16 July 2000 (age 26)
- Place of birth: Rovereto, Italy
- Height: 1.90 m (6 ft 3 in)
- Position: Goalkeeper

Team information
- Current team: Birżebbuġa St. Peter's
- Number: 1

Youth career
- –2017: Chievo
- 2017–2018: GSD Ambrosiana
- 2018–2019: → Hellas Verona (loan)

Senior career*
| Years | Team | Apps | (Gls) |
| 2017–2018 | GSD Ambrosiana | 6 | (0) |
| 2019– | Hellas Verona | 0 | (0) |
| 2019–2021 | → Virtus Verona (loan) | 8 | (0) |
| 2021–2022 | → Trento (loan) | 7 | (0) |
| 2023 | → Mantova (loan) | 2 | (0) |
| 2024–2025 | → Sporting Dubai (loan) | 31 | (0) |
| 2025–2026 | → Hellas Verona | 0 | (0) |
| 2026 | → Nogometno Društvo Gorica | | |
| 2026– | Birżebbuġa St. Peter's | 12 | (0) |
- * Club domestic league appearances and goals as of 21 November 2026

Mattia Chiesa (born 16 July 2000) is an Italian professional footballer who plays as a goalkeeper for Birżebbuġa St. Peter's, in Malta Premier League.

== Club career ==
He started his senior career with the Serie D club Ambrosiana.

On 4 July 2018, he joined Hellas Verona on loan with an option to purchase. In the 2018–19 season, he mostly played for the club's Under-19 squad, and also served as a back-up on the senior squad on multiple occasions in Serie B games.

On 26 July 2019, he was loaned by Hellas Verona to Serie C club Virtus Verona. He made his professional Serie C debut for Virtus Verona on 3 November 2019 in a game against Piacenza. He started the game and played the full match. On 3 September 2020, the loan was renewed for the 2020–21 season.

On 19 July 2021, he joined Trento, newly promoted into Serie C, on loan. He played as first-choice goalkeeper in the first half of the season. On 8 January 2022, Verona terminated the loan and included Chiesa in his Serie A squad. He was a Hellas Verona player until the end of the season.

Chiesa remained as backup goalkeeper of Hellas Verona for the first half of the 2022–2023 season. On 30 January 2023, Chiesa moved on loan to Mantova.

On 21 September 2024, Chiesa moved on loan to Sporting FC (Dubai). He made his debut on 27 September 2024 in an away match against Dubai City FC finished with a 1–1 draw. He played as first-choice goalkeeper for the entire season. He made 31 appearances in the league, as a total of 2751 minutes.

In the first part of the 2025–26 season, he returned to his parent club, Hellas Verona, where he served as the reserve goalkeeper, making no appearances in Serie A. On 2 February 2026, he mutually terminated his contract with the club, which had been due to expire on 30 June 2026.

On 15 February 2026, he signed a new contract until the end of the season with Nogometno Društvo Gorica, a historic Slovenian club competing in the 2.SLN.

In July 2026, he signed for Birżebbuġa St. Peter's, in the VBet Malta Premier.
