= DOS Kampen =

Dutch football club

- Full name: DOS Kampen
- Founded: 21 December 1926
- Ground: De Maten; Kampen
- Capacity: 5,000
- Manager: Jaap Stam
- League: Eerste Klasse Saturday D (2019–20)
Home colours

DOS Kampen (acronym of Door Oefening Sterk Kampen) is a Dutch football club based in the city of Kampen, currently competing in the Eerste Klasse.
