= Samir Lagsir =

Dutch footballer

Personal information
- Date of birth: 20 May 2003 (age 23)
- Place of birth: Zuidhorn, Netherlands
- Height: 1.75 m (5 ft 9 in)
- Position: Midfielder

Team information
- Current team: PEC Zwolle
- Number: 21

Senior career*
Years	Team	Apps	(Gls)
2020–2026	PEC Zwolle	25	(4)

International career
2019	Netherlands U17	2	(0)
- * Club domestic league appearances and goals

Samir Lagsir (born 20 May 2003) is a Dutch former professional footballer who played as a midfielder.

== Club career ==
On 10 September 2019, Lagsir signed his first professional contract with PEC Zwolle. Lagsir made his debut as a late sub with PEC Zwolle in a 5-1 Eredivisie loss to FC Twente on 31 October 2020.

He retired from playing in 2026 at the age of 23 due to recurring knee injuries.

== International career ==
Born in the Netherlands, Lagsir is of Moroccan descent. He is a youth international for the Netherlands.
