= Chardi Landu =

Dutch footballer (born 2000)

Personal information
- Full name: Chardi Mpindi Landu
- Date of birth: 18 July 2000 (age 26)
- Height: 1.75 m (5 ft 9 in)
- Position: Forward

Team information
- Current team: Europa
- Number: 12

Youth career
- 2010–2021: Twente
- 2011–2014: Brentford
- 2015–2021: PEC Zwolle

Senior career*
Years	Team	Apps	(Gls)
2021–2023	PEC Zwolle	22	(2)
2023–2025	Emmen	24	(0)
2025–	Europa	21	(6)
- * Club domestic league appearances and goals as of 5 September 2026

Chardi Mpindi Landu (born 18 July 2000) is a Dutch professional footballer who plays as a forward for Gibraltar Football League club Europa.

== Career ==
Landu played youth football for Twente before moving to the academy of English club Brentford. After three seasons, he returned to the Netherlands to join the youth academy of PEC Zwolle.

He made his professional debut for PEC Zwolle on 15 August 2021 in a 1–0 home defeat to SBV Vitesse.

On 3 July 2023, Landu signed a two-year contract with Emmen.

== Personal life ==
Born in the Netherlands, Landu is of Congolese descent.
