= 2014–15 Willem II season =

Willem II
2014–15 season
- Manager: Jurgen Streppel
- Stadium: Koning Willem II Stadion
- Eredivisie: 9th
- KNVB Cup: First round
- Average home league attendance: 12,099

Willem II is a football club based in Tilburg, North Brabant, Netherlands. They play their home games at Koning Willem II Stadion which has a capacity of 14,637. During the 2014–15 campaign they competed in the Eredivisie and KNVB Cup.

== Competitions ==
=== Eredivisie ===
==== League table ====
Pos	Team	Pld	W	D	L	GF	GA	GD	Pts	Qualification or relegation
7	Heerenveen	34	13	11	10	53	46	+7	50	Qualification for the European competition play-offs
8	Groningen	34	11	13	10	49	53	−4	46	Qualification for the Europa League group stage (Note: Groningen qualified for the Europa League group stage by winning the 2014–15 KNVB Cup.)
9	Willem II	34	13	7	14	46	50	−4	46	
10	Twente (Note: FC Twente were deducted three points twice since they did not meet the financial standards set by the KNVB.)	34	13	10	11	56	51	+5	43	
11	Utrecht	34	11	8	15	60	62	−2	41	

Source: NUsport
Rules for classification: 1) points; 2) goal difference; 3) number of goals scored

==== Matches ====
10 August 2014 Match 1	Willem II	1–3	PSV	Tilburg
16:45	Bruno Andrade 40' (yellow card) 61'; Messaoud (yellow card) 50'; Peters (yellow card) 68'; Lamprou (red card) 74'	Summary	Locadia 7'; Depay 10' 76' (pen.)	Stadium: Koning Willem II Stadion; Attendance: 11,200; Referee: (Netherlands) Kevin Blom

17 August 2014 Match 2	FC Utrecht	2–1	Willem II	Utrecht
14:30	Ayoub (yellow card) 22'; Toornstra 64' de Kogel 88'	Summary	Cornelisse (yellow card) 45'; Haemhouts 76'	Stadium: Stadion Galgenwaard; Attendance: 16,123; Referee: (Netherlands) Bjorn Kuipers

23 August 2014 Match 3	Willem II	3–0	AZ	Tilburg
18:30	Bruno Andrade 14'; Messaoud 29'; Ondaan (yellow card) 33'; Vicento 86'	Summary	Wuytens (yellow card) 37'	Stadium: Koning Willem II Stadion; Attendance: 9,500; Referee: (Netherlands) Jochem Kamphuis

29 August 2014 Match 4	Go Ahead Eagles	1–0	Willem II	Deventer
20:00	Vriends 64' (red card) 69'; Reimerink (yellow card) 71'; Schenk (yellow card) 81'	Summary	Heymans (yellow card) 45+1' (red card) 55'; Wuytens (yellow card) 86'	Stadium: De Adelaarshorst; Attendance: 7,883; Referee: (Netherlands) Reinold Wiedemeijer

13 September 2014 Match 5	Feyenoord	1–2	Willem II	Rotterdam
20:45	Kongolo (yellow card) 51'; Kazim-Richards 75'	Summary	van der Struijk 8'; Armenteros 23'; Peters (yellow card) 90+2'	Stadium: De Kuip; Attendance: 43,627; Referee: (Netherlands) Eric Braamhaar

19 September 2014 Match 6	Willem II	2–1	NAC Breda	Tilburg
20:00	Sahar 13'; Braber 90+1'	Summary	Matić 42' de Kamps (yellow card) 77' ten Rouwelaar (yellow card) 90+2'; Perica (yellow card) 90+5'	Stadium: Koning Willem II Stadion; Attendance: 13,602; Referee: (Netherlands) Richard Liesveld

28 September 2014 Match 7	FC Groningen	1–0	Willem II	Groningen
14:30	de Leeuw 31' (pen.)	Summary	van der Struijk (yellow card) 60'; Ondaan (yellow card) 90+2'	Stadium: Euroborg; Attendance: 18,811; Referee: (Netherlands) Bas Nijhuis

4 October 2014 Match 8	Willem II	2–1	Heerenveen	Tilburg
19:45	Wuytens (yellow card) 28' (goal) 76'; Ondaan 87'	Summary	Uth 41' van Aken (yellow card) 43'; Slagveer (yellow card) 72' van den Berg (yellow card) 90+3'	Stadium: Koning Willem II Stadion; Attendance: 12,500; Referee: (Netherlands) Jochem Kamphuis

18 October 2014 Match 9	Willem II	1–4	Vitesse Arnhem	Tilburg
18:30	Sahar 57'	Summary	Pröpper 15'; Traoré 45' (yellow card) 75'; Achenteh (yellow card) 68'; Wallace (yellow card) 84'; Olinynk 88'; Dauda 90+3'	Stadium: Koning Willem II Stadion; Attendance: 10,900; Referee: (Netherlands) Pieter Vink

25 October 2014 Match 10	Heracles Almelo	1–3	Willem II	Almelo
19:45	Bruns (yellow card) 58'; Tananae 77'; Linssen (yellow card) 90+2'	Summary	Wuytens 21'; Armenteros 57' 74'	Stadium: Polman Stadion; Attendance: 8,500; Referee: (Netherlands) van de Graaf

2 November 2014 Match 11	Willem II	1–1	SC Cambuur	Tilburg
14:30	Armenteros 90+1'	Summary	de Ridder (yellow card) 45+1'; Rusnák 73'	Stadium: Koning Willem II Stadion; Attendance: 11,095; Referee: (Netherlands) Jeroen Sanders

8 November 2014 Match 12	ADO Den Haag	3–2	Willem II	The Hague
18:30	Gehrt 2' van Duinen (yellow card) 8'; Kramer 35'; Alberg 73' (pen.)	Report	Wuytens 51'; Armenteros 62'; Wuytens (yellow card) 69'; Ondaan (yellow card) 72'; Peters (yellow card) 81'; Dijks (yellow card) 90+3'	Stadium: Kyocera Stadion; Attendance: 13,139; Referee: (Netherlands) Eric Braamhaar

22 November 2014 Match 13	Willem II	1–1	Excelsior	Tilburg
20:45	Armenteros 67' (pen.)	Summary	van Waert 64'; Alessandro Damen (yellow card) 90+3'	Stadium: Koning Willem II Stadion; Attendance: 10,850; Referee: (Netherlands) Martin van den Kerkhof

28 November 2014 Match 14	FC Dordrecht	0–4	Willem II	Dordrecht
20:00	Fortes (yellow card) 46'	Summary	Armenteros 6' 55'; Sahar 16'; Wuytens (yellow card) 43'; Ondaan 90+4'	Stadium: GN Bouw Stadion; Attendance: 3,884; Referee: (Netherlands) Pieter Vink

6 December 2014 Match 15	Ajax	5–0	Willem II	Amsterdam
20:45	Sigþórsson 14'; Milik 27' 43'; Veltman 31'; Klassen 57'	Summary	Messaoud (yellow card) 15'; Dijks (yellow card) 35'; Wuytens (yellow card) 44'; Ippel (yellow card) 83'	Stadium: Amsterdam Arena; Attendance: 50,455; Referee: (Netherlands) Björn Kuipers

13 December 2014 Match 16	Willem II	0–1	PEC Zwolle	Tilburg
19:45		Summary	Necid 74'; Lam (yellow card) 84'	Stadium: Koning Willem II Stadion; Attendance: 11,500; Referee: (Netherlands) Ed Janssen

21 December 2014 Match 17	Twente	3–2	Willem II	Enschede
16:45	Mokhtar 12'; Corona (yellow card) 70'; Tapia (red card) 81'; Bjelland 90+2'; Børven 90+4'	Summary	Messaoud 31'; Peters (yellow card) 38'; Haemhouts 72'	Stadium: De Grolsch Veste; Attendance: 28,200; Referee: (Netherlands) Jochem Kamphuis

18 January 2015 Match 18	Willem II	1–0	Go Ahead Eagles	Tilburg
12:30	Braber 59'; Wuytens (yellow card) 75'; Dijks (yellow card) 90'	Summary	Amevor (yellow card) 29'; Wijnaldum (yellow card) 63' (yellow-red card); Turuc (yellow card) 77'	Stadium: Koning Willem II Stadion; Attendance: 11,250; Referee: (Netherlands) Björn Kuipers

25 January 2015 Match 19	NAC Breda	0–0	Willem II	Breda
14:30	Sarpong (yellow card) 48'; Matić (yellow card) 53'; Falkenburg (yellow card) 81'	Summary	Wuytens (yellow card) 52'; Dijks (yellow card) 89'	Stadium: Rat Verlegh Stadion; Attendance: 17,800; Referee: (Netherlands) Richard Liesveld

31 January 2015 Match 20	PSV	2–1	Willem II	Eindhoven
18:30	Locadia 84'; Depay 87'	Summary	Braber 30' (yellow card) 57'; Dijks (yellow card) 53'; Lamprou (yellow card) 75'; Cabral (yellow card) 86'	Stadium: Philips Stadion; Attendance: 33,000; Referee: (Netherlands) Tom van Sichem

4 February 2015 Match 21	Willem II	1–0	FC Utrecht	Tilburg
20:45	Haemhouts 80'	Summary		Stadium: Koning Willem II Stadion; Attendance: 9,371; Referee: (Netherlands) Dennis Higler

8 February 2015 Match 22	Willem II	3–0	Heracles Almelo	Tilburg
14:30	Armenteros 16' (yellow card) 89'; Haemhouts 39'; Dijks (yellow card) 54'; Veldmate 83' (o.g.)	Summary	Cziommer (yellow card) 19'; Vujičević (yellow card) 64'; Aktaou (yellow card) 87'	Stadium: Koning Willem II Stadion; Attendance: 14,500; Referee: (Netherlands) Ed Janssen

14 February 2015 Match 23	Vitesse Arnhem	2–0	Willem II	Arnhem
19:45	Achenteh (yellow card) 16'; Labyad 28'; Traoré 44' (yellow card) 55'; Diks (yellow card) 87'	Summary	Ondaan (yellow card) 16'	Stadium: GelreDome; Attendance: 13,956; Referee: (Netherlands) Edwin van de Graaf

22 February 2015 Match 24	Willem II	1–1	Ajax	Tilburg
14:30	Messaoud 52'	Summary	El Ghazi (yellow card) 35'; Milik 37' (yellow card) 90+4'; Klassen (yellow card) 57'; Viergever (yellow card) 73'	Stadium: Koning Willem II Stadion; Attendance: 14,500; Referee: (Netherlands) Kevin Blom

28 February 2015 Match 25	AZ	2–0	Willem II	Alkmaar
19:45	Berghuis 41'; Johansson (yellow card) 84'; Haps (yellow card) 85' dos Santos 90+3'	Summary	Cabral (yellow card) 45+1'	Stadium: AFAS Stadion; Attendance: 16,341; Referee: (Netherlands) Eric Braamhaar

6 March 2015 Match 26	Willem II	2–2	Twente	Tilburg
20:00	Cabral 19' 23'; Haemhouts (yellow card) 55'	Summary	Ziyech 45' 53'; Martina (yellow card) 80'; Bjelland (yellow card) 84'	Stadium: Koning Willem II Stadion; Attendance: 13,450; Referee: (Netherlands) Reinold Wiedemeijer

14 March 2015 Match 27	Excelsior	2–3	Willem II	Rotterdam
20:45	Bovenberg (yellow card) 41' van Weert 57'; Stans 90+3'	Summary	Haemhouts 19'; Messaoud 65' (yellow card) 83'; Sahar 90+1'; Lamprou (yellow card) 90+3'	Stadium: Stadion Woudestein; Attendance: 3,525; Referee: (Netherlands) Jochem Kamphuis

21 March 2015 Match 28	Willem II	2–1	FC Dordrecht	Tilburg
19:45	Sahar 39' 60' (yellow card) 53'	Summary	van Overeem (yellow card) 69'; Biekman 89'	Stadium: Koning Willem II Stadion; Attendance: 11,890; Referee: (Netherlands) Björn Kuipers

4 April 2015 Match 29	PEC Zwolle	1–0	Willem II	Zwolle
18:30	van Polen 75'	Summary	Messaoud (yellow card) 77'	Stadium: IJsseldelta Stadion; Attendance: 12,250; Referee: (Netherlands) Jeroen Manschot

12 April 2015 Match 30	Willem II	2–2	Feyenoord	Tilburg
12:30	Heerkens 37'; Bruno Andrade 74'	Report	Manu 30'; Kazim-Richards 82'	Stadium: Koning Willem II Stadion; Attendance: 14,400; Referee: (Netherlands) Eric Braamhaar

18 April 2015 Match 31	Willem II	1–4	FC Groningen	Tilburg
20:45	Messaoud 67' van der Struijk (yellow card) 85'	Summary	Antonia 8'; Chery 22' 90+4' de Leeuw 62'; Kieftenbeld (yellow card) 79'; Padt (yellow card) 90+5'	Stadium: Koning Willem II Stadion; Attendance: 12,680; Referee: (Netherlands) Allard Lindhout

25 April 2015 Match 32	Heerenveen	1–1	Willem II	Heerenveen
18:30	Otigba (yellow card) 28'; Thern (yellow card) 52'; Uth 80'; Jerry St. Juste (yellow card) 89'	Summary	Wuytens (yellow card) 26'; Bruno Andrade (yellow card) 28' (goal) 78'; Messaoud (yellow card) 90+1'	Stadium: Abe Lenstra Stadion; Attendance: 24,211; Referee: (Netherlands) Jochem Kamphuis

10 May 2015 Match 33	Willem II	1–0	ADO Den Haag	Tilburg
14:30	Peters (yellow card) 13'; Armenteros 62'	Summary	Meijers (yellow card) 55'	Stadium: Koning Willem II Stadion; Attendance: 12,500; Referee: (Netherlands) Siemen Mulder

17 May 2015 Match 34	SC Cambuur	1–2	Willem II	Leeuwarden
14:30	Bakker (yellow card) 56' (goal) 86' (pen.)	Summary	Sahar 35' (yellow card) 75'; Armenteros 47' (pen.); Braber (yellow card) 86'	Stadium: Cambuur Stadion; Attendance: 9,925; Referee: (Netherlands) Ed Janssen

=== KNVB Beker ===
23 September 2014 Round 1	Deltasport/Leonidas	2–1	Willem II	Vlaardingen
20:00	Redouan Boulfalfal 35'; Mitchell Drooduin (yellow card) 56'; Jimmy van der Vaart (yellow card) 74'; Leon Krznaric 90+1'	Summary	Sahar 53'; Wuytens (yellow card) 61'	Stadium: SPORTPARK BROEKPOLDER; Attendance: 800; Referee: (Netherlands) Rob Dieperink
