= 2014–15 ADO Den Haag season =

ADO Den Haag
2014–15 season
- Owner: Hui Wang
- Chairman: Henk Jagersma
- Manager: Henk Fraser
- Stadium: Cars Jeans Stadion
- Eredivisie: 13th
- KNVB Cup: Second round
- Top goalscorer: League: Michiel Kramer (17); All: Michiel Kramer (17)
- Average home league attendance: 11,976
Home colours	Away colours

Alles Door Oefening Den Haag (Dutch pronunciation: [ˈɑ.ləs doːr ˈu.fə.nɪŋ dɛn ˈɦaːχ]), commonly known by the abbreviated name ADO Den Haag [ˈaː.do dɛn ˈɦaːχ], is a Dutch football club from the city of The Hague. They play their home games at Kyocera Stadion which has a capacity of 15,000. During the 2014–15 season, they competed in the Eredivisie, in which they finished 13th, and the KNVB Cup, where they were knocked out in the second round.

== Competitions ==
=== Eredivisie ===
==== League table ====
Pos	Team	Pld	W	D	L	GF	GA	GD	Pts
11	Utrecht	34	11	8	15	60	62	−2	41
12	Cambuur	34	11	8	15	46	56	−10	41
13	ADO Den Haag	34	9	10	15	44	53	−9	37
14	Heracles	34	11	4	19	47	64	−17	37
15	Excelsior	34	6	14	14	47	63	−16	32

Source: NUsport
Rules for classification: 1) points; 2) goal difference; 3) number of goals scored

==== League matches ====
10 August 2014 Match 1	ADO Den Haag	0–1	Feyenoord	The Hague
12:30	Schet (yellow card) 36' (yellow-red card); Meijers (yellow card) 43'; Kramer (yellow card) 52'; Jansen (yellow card) 54'; Zuiverloon (yellow card) 63'; Kristensen (yellow card) 65'; Merencia (yellow card) 90'	Summary	Manu (yellow card) 25' te Vrede (yellow card) 77' (goal) 90' van Beek (yellow card) 80'; Wilkshire (yellow card) 82'; Clasie (yellow card) 86'	Stadium: Kyocera Stadion; Attendance: 11,716; Referee: (Netherlands) Danny Makkelie

16 August 2014 Match 2	Twente	2–2	ADO Den Haag	Enschede
19:45	Mokhtar (yellow card) 41'; Mokotjo 45+1'; Bengtsson (yellow card) 54'; Eghan 86'	Summary	Alberg 54' (pen.) (yellow card) 79' van Duinen 77'	Stadium: De Grolsch Veste; Attendance: 28,500; Referee: (Netherlands) Reinold Wiedemeijer

24 August 2014 Match 3	ADO Den Haag	3–0	FC Groningen	The Hague
14:30	Kristensen 56'; Kramer 82' 85'	Summary		Stadium: Kyocera Stadion; Attendance: 10,214; Referee: (Netherlands) Richard Liesveld

30 August 2014 Match 4	SC Cambuur	3–2	ADO Den Haag	Leeuwarden
18:30	Bakker 40' 67' (pen.); Hemmen 80'	Summary	Kramer 53'; Houtkoop 55'	Stadium: Cambuur Stadion; Attendance: 9,279; Referee: (Netherlands) Martin van den Kerkhof

14 September 2014 Match 5	FC Utrecht	0–0	ADO Den Haag	Utrecht
12:30	Leeuwin (yellow card) 8'; Yannick Cortie (yellow card) 55'	Summary	Alberg (yellow card) 17'	Stadium: Stadion Galgenwaard; Attendance: 17,400; Referee: (Netherlands) Serdar Gözübüyük

20 September 2014 Match 6	ADO Den Haag	1–1	Go Ahead Eagles	The Hague
19:45	Kanon (yellow card) 81'; Kramer 84'	Summary	Duits (yellow card) 27'; Derijck 60' (o.g.)	Stadium: Kyocera Stadion; Attendance: 10,367; Referee: (Netherlands) Edwin van de Graaf

27 September 2014 Match 7	ADO Den Haag	2–3	AZ	The Hague
20:45	Zuiverloon (yellow card) 8'; Kramer 42'; Alberg (yellow card) 58' (goal) 85'	Summary	Derrick Luckassen (yellow card) 25'; Hupperts (yellow card) 29'; Poulsen 45'; Johansson 67'; Gudelj 83'	Stadium: Kyocera Stadion; Attendance: 10,678; Referee: (Netherlands) Tom van Sichem

3 October 2014 Match 8	Vitesse Arnhem	6–1	ADO Den Haag	Arnhem
20:00	Leerdam 5' 14'; Derijck 31' (o.g.); Vejinović 37' 40' (pen.) 62' (pen.)	Summary	Kramer 21'; Derijck (yellow card) 23'; Jansen (yellow card) 61'; Zuiverloon (yellow card) 68'	Stadium: GelreDome; Attendance: 13,231; Referee: (Netherlands) Bjorn Kuipers

18 October 2014 Match 9	NAC Breda	1–1	ADO Den Haag	Breda
20:45	Damčevski (yellow card) 29'; Seuntjens 31'; Ssewankambo (yellow card) 54' de Kamps (yellow card) 61'	Summary	Kanon (red card) 9'; Alberg (yellow card) 9'; Malone (yellow card) 63'; Kramer 67' (yellow card) 71'	Stadium: Rat Verlegh Stadion; Attendance: 18,200; Referee: (Netherlands) Jochem Kamphuis

24 October 2014 Match 10	ADO Den Haag	2–0	FC Dordrecht	The Hague
20:00	Kramer 17'; Jansen (yellow card) 39'; Gehrt 74'	Summary	van Haaren (yellow card) 9'; Fortes (yellow card) 15'	Stadium: Kyocera Stadion; Attendance: 11,023; Referee: (Netherlands) Richard Liesveld

1 November 2014 Match 11	PSV	1–0	ADO Den Haag	Eindhoven
20:45	Hendrix (yellow card) 6' (yellow-red card); Depay 49'	Summary		Stadium: Philips Stadion; Attendance: 30,800; Referee: (Netherlands) Pol van Boekel

8 November 2014 Match 12	ADO Den Haag	3–2	Willem II	The Hague
18:30	Gehrt 2' van Duinen (yellow card) 8'; Kramer 35'; Alberg 73' (pen.)	Summary	Hansen 51' (o.g.); Armenteros 62'; Wuytens (yellow card) 69'; Ondaan (yellow card) 72'; Peters (yellow card) 81'; Dijks (yellow card) 90+3'	Stadium: Kyocera Stadion; Attendance: 13,139; Referee: (Netherlands) Eric Braamhaar

23 November 2014 Match 13	Heracles Almelo	3–1	ADO Den Haag	Almelo
14:30	Bruns (yellow card) 13' (goal) 43'; Tannane 32' 45'	Summary	Gehrt 9'; Malone (yellow card) 84'	Stadium: Polman Stadion; Attendance: 8,219; Referee: (Netherlands) Dennis Higler

30 November 2014 Match 14	ADO Den Haag	1–1	Ajax	The Hague
12:30	Kramer (yellow card) 21' (goal) 85'; Wormgoor (yellow card) 44'; Zuiverloon (yellow card) 80' (yellow-red card); Jansen (yellow card) 90+5'	Summary	Klassen 8' (yellow card) 32'; Viergever (yellow card) 90+5'	Stadium: Kyocera Stadion; Attendance: 14,657; Referee: (Netherlands) Serder Gözübüyük

7 December 2014 Match 15	PEC Zwolle	3–1	ADO Den Haag	Zwolle
12:30	van Polen (yellow card) 14'; Necid 17' (pen.) 71'; Drost 58'	Summary	Kristensen (yellow card) 17'; Jansen (yellow card) 22'; Kramer (yellow card) 26' (goal) 74'; Kanon (yellow card) 88'; Meijers (yellow card) 90+1'	Stadium: IJsseldelta Stadion; Attendance: 11,700; Referee: (Netherlands) Kevin Blom

13 December 2014 Match 16	ADO Den Haag	2–2	Excelsior	The Hague
19:45	van Duinen 36'; Zuiverloon 40' (yellow card) 76'; Malone (yellow card) 44'; Alberg (yellow card) 66'	Summary	Bruins 13' (yellow card) 73'; Gouriye 34'	Stadium: Kyocera Stadion; Attendance: 12,146; Referee: (Netherlands) Reinold Wiedemeijer

19 December 2014 Match 17	Heerenveen	0–0	ADO Den Haag	Heerenveen
20:00	Nordfeldt (yellow card) 10'; Uth (yellow card) 50'	Summary	Zwinkels (yellow card) 9'; Kramer (yellow card) 50'; Jansen (yellow card) 76'	Stadium: Abe Lenstra Stadion; Attendance: 23,200; Referee: (Netherlands) Pieter Vink

17 January 2015 Match 18	ADO Den Haag	2–2	SC Cambuur	The Hague
19:45	van Duinen 1'; Alberg 38'; Schet (yellow card) 74'	Summary	Ogbeche 36' 78'	Stadium: Kyocera Stadion; Attendance: 10,021; Referee: (Netherlands) Dennis Higler

25 January 2015 Match 19	Go Ahead Eagles	1–0	ADO Den Haag	Deventer
16:45	Duits (yellow card) 15' van der Linden 43' (pen.)	Summary	Malone (yellow card) 14'; Wormgoor (red card) 41'	Stadium: De Adelaarshorst; Attendance: 7,978; Referee: (Netherlands) Ed Janssen

1 February 2015 Match 20	Feyenoord	2–1	ADO Den Haag	Rotterdam
12:30	Immers 10' (yellow card) 54'; Derijck 20' (o.g.)	Summary	Malone (yellow card) 12' van Duinen 48'; Meijers (yellow card) 61'; Wormgoor (yellow card) 88'	Stadium: De Kuip; Attendance: 46,500; Referee: (Netherlands) Reinold Wiedemiejer

4 February 2015 Match 21	ADO Den Haag	2–0	Twente	The Hague
18:30	Yakovenko 13' (yellow card) 22'; Alberg 90+1' (pen.)	Summary	Tapia (yellow card) 38'; Castaignos (yellow card) 44'	Stadium: Kyocera Stadion; Attendance: 12,998; Referee: (Netherlands) Pieter Vink

7 February 2015 Match 22	FC Dordrecht	0–0	ADO Den Haag	Dordrecht
18:30	Biekman (yellow card) 44'; Ojo (yellow card) 55'	Summary	van Duinen (yellow card) 56'; Hansen (yellow card) 66'	Stadium: GN Bouw Stadion; Attendance: 3,974; Referee: (Netherlands) Serdar Gözübüyük

14 February 2015 Match 23	ADO Den Haag	3–2	NAC Breda	The Hague
20:45	Wormgoor (yellow card) 17'; Kramer 56' 86'; Houtkoop 76' van Duinen (yellow card) 89'	Summary	de Zeeuw 10' 59'; Koch (yellow card) 39'	Stadium: Kyocera Stadion; Attendance: 11,112; Referee: (Netherlands) Richard Liesveld

21 February 2015 Match 24	ADO Den Haag	3–2	PEC Zwolle	The Hague
18:30	Alberg 43'; Wilson Eduardo 59'; Kramer 90+3'	Summary	Lukoki (yellow card) 29'; Saymak (yellow card) 45+2' (goal) 90+1'; Rienstra 72' van der Werff (yellow card) 90'	Stadium: Kyocera Stadion; Attendance: 13,895; Referee: (Netherlands) Björn Kuipers

1 March 2015 Match 25	FC Groningen	1–1	ADO Den Haag	Groningen
14:30	van der Velden (yellow card) 24'; Chery 53' (pen.); Payne (yellow card) 55'	Summary	Wormgoor (yellow card) 49'; Derijck (yellow card) 51'; Malone (yellow card) 88'; Houtkoop 90+5'	Stadium: Euroborg; Attendance: 19,718; Referee: (Netherlands) Jeroen Manschot

7 March 2015 Match 26	ADO Den Haag	0–1	Heerenveen	The Hague
19:45		Summary	Thern (yellow card) 27' van Anholt (yellow card) 56'; Otigba (yellow card) 62'; Slagveer 78'	Stadium: Kyocera Stadion; Attendance: 10,786; Referee: (Netherlands) Martin van den Kerkhof

15 March 2015 Match 27	ADO Den Haag	1–3	Heracles Almelo	The Hague
12:30	van Duinen 42'; Alberg (yellow card) 47'; Kramer (yellow card) 61'; Wormgoor (yellow card) 79'	Summary	Weghorst 4'; Veldmate (yellow card) 40'; Cziommer (yellow card) 42'; Avdić 55'; Bel Hassani 67'	Stadium: Kyocera Stadion; Attendance: 10,964; Referee: (Netherlands) Danny Makkelie

22 March 2015 Match 28	Ajax	1–0	ADO Den Haag	Amsterdam
16:45	Serero (yellow card) 54'; Houtkoop 80' (o.g.); Milik (yellow card) 84'	Summary	Derijck (yellow card) 31'; Yakovenko (yellow card) 45' van Duinen (yellow card) 80'	Stadium: Amsterdam Arena; Attendance: 49,743; Referee: (Netherlands) Richard Liesveld

5 April 2015 Match 29	Excelsior	2–3	ADO Den Haag	Rotterdam
14:30	Fischer (yellow card) 48'; Auassar 59'; Gouriye 63' van Weert (yellow card) 88'	Summary	Kramer 34' 90+3'; Meijers (yellow card) 57'; Alberg 79'	Stadium: Stadion Woudestein; Attendance: 3,600; Referee: (Netherlands) Kevin Blom

12 April 2015 Match 30	ADO Den Haag	2–0	FC Utrecht	The Hague
16:45	Alberg 73' (pen.); Kastaneer 85'	Summary	Janssen (yellow card) 72'	Stadium: Kyocera Stadion; Attendance: 10,102; Referee: (Netherlands) Jochem Kamphuis

18 April 2015 Match 31	AZ	3–1	ADO Den Haag	Alkmaar
18:30	Luckassen (yellow card) 24' (goal) 60'; Gudelj 29' 65'	Summary	Zuiverloon (yellow card) 34'; Wilson Eduardo 55'; Kramer (yellow card) 59'	Stadium: AFAS Stadion; Attendance: 15,914; Referee: (Netherlands) Danny Makkelie

24 April 2015 Match 32	ADO Den Haag	1–0	Vitesse Arnhem	The Hague
20:00	Alberg (yellow card) 42'; Kastaneer (yellow card) 75'; Kramer 85'; Kristensen (yellow card) 90'	Summary	Vejinović (yellow card) 44'; Nakamba (yellow card) 90+2'	Stadium: Kyocera Stadion; Attendance: 14,837; Referee: (Netherlands) Ed Janssen

10 May 2015 Match 33	Willem II	1–0	ADO Den Haag	Tilburg
14:30	Peters (yellow card) 13'; Armenteros 62'	Summary	Meijers (yellow card) 55'	Stadium: Koning Willem II Stadion; Attendance: 12,500; Referee: (Netherlands) Siemen Mulder

17 May 2015 Match 34	ADO Den Haag	2–3	PSV	The Hague
14:30	Yakovenko 24'; Bakker 56'	Summary	Narsingh 45' de Jong 61'; Wijnaldum 90+4'	Stadium: Kyocera Stadion; Attendance: 14,937; Referee: (Netherlands) Kevin Blom

=== KNVB Cup ===
23 September 2014 Second round	Almere City	2–2 (a.e.t.) (2–0 p)	ADO Den Haag	Almere
20:00	Janssen 65' 112'; Oost (yellow card) 92'; Keller (red card) 116'	Summary	van Duinen 44'; Jansen (yellow card) 49'; Derijck (red card) 70'; Kristensen 117' (pen.)	Stadium: Mitsubishi Forklift Stadion; Attendance: 867; Referee: (Netherlands) Siemen Mulder
