= 2017–18 PEC Zwolle season =

PEC Zwolle
2017–18 season
- Chairman: Adriaan Visser
- Manager: (Netherlands) John van 't Schip
- Stadium: MAC³PARK stadion
- Eredivisie: 9th
- KNVB Cup: Quarter-finals
- Top goalscorer: League: Mustafa Saymak; All: Mustafa Saymak (11)
Home colours	Away colours	Third colours

The 2017–18 season was PEC Zwolle's 107th season of play, it marked its 16th season in the Eredivisie and its 6th consecutive season in the top flight of Dutch football.

== Competitions ==
=== Friendlies ===
1 July 2017 Friendly	SC Genemuiden	0 – 3	PEC Zwolle	Genemuiden
		Report	27' (o.g.) Own goal 50', 72' Erik Israelsson	Stadium: Sportpark De Wetering; Referee: Johan Schuring

4 July 2017 Friendly	HZVV	0 – 3	PEC Zwolle	Hoogeveen
		Report	23' Mark Bruintjes; 27' Stefan Nijland; 40' Erik Israelsson	Stadium: Sportpark Bentinckspark; Referee: Huisman

8 July 2017 Friendly	SV Dalfsen	0 – 8	PEC Zwolle	Dalfsen
		Report	11' Kingsley Ehizibue; 22' Younes Namli; 24' Erik Israelsson; 34' Mustafa Saymak; 39' Piotr Parzyszek; 42' Youness Mokhtar; 79', 88' Ted van de Pavert	Stadium: Sportpark Gerner; Attendance: 2,200; Referee: Steve Oosterkamp

11 July 2017 Friendly	VVOG	0 – 0	PEC Zwolle	Harderwijk
		Report		Stadium: Sportpark De Strokel; Attendance: Bronsvoort

14 July 2017 Friendly	PEC Zwolle	3 – 0	FC Emmen	Wijthmen
	Bram van Polen 7' (pen.); Piotr Parzyszek 36'; Adham El Idrissi 73'; Philippe Sandler (yellow card)	Report		Stadium: Sportpark De Elshof; Attendance: 1,500; Referee: Sander van der Eijk

18 July 2017 Friendly	PEC Zwolle	3 – 0	Almere City FC	Zwolle
	Piotr Parzyszek 7', 41'; Youness Mokhtar 45+1'	Report		Stadium: MAC³PARK Stadion; Attendance: 1,700; Referee: Siemen Mulder

21 July 2017 Friendly	PEC Zwolle	2 – 0	(Turkey) Gençlerbirliği SK	Hattem
	Erik Bakker 35' (pen.); Youness Mokhtar 43'	Report	(yellow card) Zeki Yavru; (yellow card) Orhan Şam; (yellow card) (yellow-red card) Ahmet Oğuz	Stadium: Sportpark Het Achterveen; Referee: Danny Makkelie

28 July 2017 Friendly	FC Volendam	2 – 2	PEC Zwolle	Volendam
	Nick Runderkamp 39', 45+1'	Report	13' Mustafa Saymak; 77' Piotr Parzyszek	Stadium: Kras Stadion; Referee: Edwin van de Graaf

5 August 2017 Friendly	PEC Zwolle	4 – 0	SC Cambuur	Zwolle
	Ryan Thomas 8'; Youness Mokhtar 19', 63'; Piotr Parzyszek 31'	Report		Stadium: MAC³PARK stadion Referee: Edwin van de Graaf

30 August 2017 Friendly	SC Heerenveen	2 – 0	PEC Zwolle	Heerenveen
	Henk Veerman 22', 55'	Report		Stadium: Sportpark Skoatterwâld

4 October 2017 Friendly	SBV Vitesse	1 – 0	PEC Zwolle	Arnhem
	Thomas Oude Kotte 85'	Report		Stadium: National Sports Centre Papendal

12 January 2018 Friendly	PEC Zwolle	5 – 1	(Germany) Sportfreunde Lotte	Zwolle
	Chris Reher 85' (o.g.); Terell Ondaan 17'; Mustafa Saymak 31'; Kingsley Ehizibue 47'; Ruben Ligeon 70'	Report	68' Kevin Freiberger	Stadium: MAC³PARK stadion

22 March 2018 Friendly	PEC Zwolle	3 – 1	Heracles Almelo	Zwolle
	Terell Ondaan 50', 84'; Isaac Christie-Davies 70'	Report	42' Vincent Vermeij	Stadium: MAC³PARK stadion Referee: Paarhuis

=== Eredivisie ===
==== League table ====
Pos	Team	Pld	W	D	L	GF	GA	GD	Pts	Qualification or relegation
7	ADO Den Haag	34	13	8	13	45	53	−8	47	Qualification to European competition play-offs (Note: Four teams play for a spot in the 2018–19 UEFA Europa League second qualifying round.)
8	Heerenveen	34	12	10	12	48	53	−5	46	Qualification to European competition play-offs
9	PEC Zwolle	34	12	8	14	42	54	−12	44	
10	Heracles Almelo	34	11	9	14	50	64	−14	42	
11	Excelsior	34	11	7	16	41	56	−15	40	

Source: eredivisie.nl
Rules for classification: 1) Points; 2) Goal difference; 3) Goals scored; 4) Head-to-head points; 5) Head-to-head goal difference; 6) Head-to-head away goals scored; 7) Play-off if relevant for deciding champion, relegation or participating in a European league, otherwise by draw. 8) Penalty shoot-out (only after a play-off)

==== Results summary ====
Overall								Home						Away					
Pld	W	D	L	GF	GA	GD	Pts	W	D	L	GF	GA	GD	W	D	L	GF	GA	GD
34	12	8	14	42	54	−12	44	8	4	5	27	20	+7	4	4	9	15	34	−19

Source: League matches

==== Results by matchday ====
Matchday	1	2	3	4	5	6	7	8	9	10	11	12	13	14	15	16	17	18	19	20	21	22	23	24	25	26	27	28	29	30	31	32	33	34
Ground	H	A	H	A	H	A	H	A	A	H	A	H	A	H	A	H	A	A	H	H	A	H	A	H	A	H	A	H	H	A	H	A	H	A
Result	W	D	W	L	W	D	W	D	W	W	D	L	W	D	W	D	W	L	W	L	L	W	L	L	L	D	L	L	W	L	D	L	L	L
Position	4	6	3	9	7	6	4	5	4	4	4	4	4	4	4	4	4	4	4	5	5	5	5	6	6	7	7	7	6	6	7	8	8	9

Source: PEC Zwolle
A = Away; H = Home; W = Win; D = Draw; L = Loss

==== Matches ====
Win Draw Loss

13 August 2017 1	PEC Zwolle	4 – 2	Roda JC Kerkrade	Zwolle
	Dirk Marcellis 45+1'; Adil Auassar 53' (o.g.); Mustafa Saymak 66'; Bram van Polen 74'	Report; Matchreport	22', 62' (pen.) Simon Gustafson; (yellow card) 79' Simon Gustafson	Stadium: MAC³PARK stadion Attendance: 13,000; Referee: Bas Nijhuis

20 August 2017 2	Sparta Rotterdam	1 – 1	PEC Zwolle	Rotterdam
	Robert Mühren 23'; George Dobson (yellow card) 30'; Sherel Floranus (yellow card) 45'; Robert Mühren (yellow card) 61'; Kenneth Dougall (yellow card) 67'	Report; Matchreport	13' Youness Mokhtar; (yellow card) 24' Erik Bakker; (yellow card) 58' Youness Mokhtar; (yellow card) 87' Dico Koppers	Stadium: Het Kasteel; Attendance: 10,012; Referee: Allard Lindhout

26 August 2017 3	PEC Zwolle	2 – 0	FC Twente	Zwolle
	Youness Mokhtar 33'; Bram van Polen (yellow card) 71'; Bram van Polen 78' (pen.); Stefan Nijland (yellow card) 90+1'	Report; Matchreport	(yellow card) 24' Jelle van der Heyden; (yellow card) 77' Dejan Trajkovski; (yellow card) 84' Stefan Thesker	Stadium: MAC³PARK stadion Attendance: 12,800; Referee: Ed Janssen

9 September 2017 4	AFC Ajax	3 – 0	PEC Zwolle	Amsterdam
	Klaas-Jan Huntelaar 6', 88'; Hakim Ziyech 71'; Joël Veltman (yellow card) 72'; Donny van de Beek (yellow card) 76'	Report; Matchreport	(yellow card) 90' Erik Bakker	Stadium: Amsterdam Arena; Attendance: 50,902; Referee: Serdar Gözübüyük

16 September 2017 5	PEC Zwolle	2 – 1	Heracles Almelo	Zwolle
	Youness Mokhtar 4', 85'; Philippe Sandler (yellow card) 17'; Dirk Marcellis (yellow card) 41'; Rick Dekker (yellow card) 77'; Youness Mokhtar (yellow card) 90+3'; Stefan Nijland (yellow card) 90+4'	Report; Matchreport	(yellow card) 26' Paul Gladon; (yellow card) 39' Bart van Hintum; 78' Jamiro Monteiro; (yellow card) 80' Brahim Darri	Stadium: MAC³PARK stadion Attendance: 12,500; Referee: Jeroen Manschot

24 September 2017 6	VVV-Venlo	1 – 1	PEC Zwolle	Venlo
	Clint Leemans 69'; Danny Post (yellow card) 89'; Clint Leemans (yellow card) 90+4'	Report; Matchreport	20' Kingsley Ehizibue; (yellow card) 68' Dirk Marcellis	Stadium: De Koel; Attendance: 6,621; Referee: Bas Nijhuis

30 September 2017 7	PEC Zwolle	3 – 2	FC Groningen	Zwolle
	Stefan Nijland 19'; Bram van Polen (yellow card) 50'; Diederik Boer (yellow card) 55'; Ryan Thomas 60'; Younes Namli (yellow card) 84'; Kingsley Ehizibue (yellow card) 84'; Youness Mokhtar 90+3'	Report; Matchreport	15' Ritsu Doan; 54' Tom van Weert; (yellow card) 84' Oussama Idrissi; (red card) 87' Tom van Weert	Stadium: MAC³PARK stadion Attendance: 13,160; Referee: Pol van Boekel

14 October 2017 8	Feyenoord	0 – 0	PEC Zwolle	Rotterdam
	Sofyan Amrabat (yellow card) 17'; Steven Berghuis (yellow card) 90+6'	Report; Matchreport	(yellow card) 22' Kingsley Ehizibue; (yellow card) 32' Youness Mokhtar; (yellow card) 41' Stefan Nijland	Stadium: De Kuip; Attendance: 47,500; Referee: Dennis Higler

21 October 2017 9	NAC Breda	0 – 2	PEC Zwolle	Breda
	Menno Koch (yellow card) 56'; Manuel García (yellow card) 88'	Report; Matchreport	(yellow card) 45' Nicolás Freire; 45+3' (pen.) Bram van Polen; (yellow card) 48' Ryan Thomas; 82' Mustafa Saymak	Stadium: Rat Verlegh Stadion; Attendance: 18,423; Referee: Martin van den Kerkhof

28 October 2017 10	PEC Zwolle	2 – 0	ADO Den Haag	Zwolle
	Parzyszek 7'; Namli 11'	Report [ Matchreport]	Meißner (yellow card) 31'; Gorter (yellow card) 40'; Immers (yellow card) 84'	Stadium: MAC³PARK stadion Attendance: 13,030; Referee: Edwin van de Graaf

5 November 2017 11	Vitesse	0 – 0	PEC Zwolle	Arnhem
		Report; Matchreport		Stadium: GelreDome; Attendance: 18,349; Referee: Danny Makkelie

19 November 2017 12	PEC Zwolle	0 – 1	PSV	Zwolle
	van Polen (yellow card) 21'	Report; Matchreport	Hendrix (yellow card) 13' van Ginkel (yellow card) 61'; Luckassen (yellow card) 64'; Ishimat-Mirin 90+3'	Stadium: MAC³PARK stadion Attendance: 13,250; Referee: Björn Kuipers

25 November 2017 13	SC Heerenveen	1 – 2	PEC Zwolle	Heerenveen
	Michel Vlap 13'; Michel Vlap (yellow card) 21'; Stijn Schaars (yellow card) 45'; Kik Pierie (yellow card) 84'	Report; Matchreport	(yellow card) 23' Kingsley Ehizibue; 43' Nicolás Freire; 49' Mustafa Saymak; (yellow card) 65' Mustafa Saymak; (yellow card) 89' Ryan Thomas	Stadium: Abe Lenstra Stadion; Attendance: 20,832; Referee: Serdar Gözübüyük

1 December 2017 14	PEC Zwolle	1 – 1	FC Utrecht	Zwolle
	Dirk Marcellis (yellow card) 12'; Mustafa Saymak 83'	Report; Matchreport	(yellow card) 16' Urby Emanuelson; 33' Sander van de Streek; (yellow card) 56'Sander van de Streek	Stadium: MAC³PARK stadion Attendance: 13,250; Referee: Ed Janssen

9 December 2017 15	S.B.V. Excelsior	1 – 2	PEC Zwolle	Rotterdam
	Jeffry Fortes (yellow card) 26'; Mike van Duinen (yellow card) 32'; Mike van Duinen 48' (pen.); Stanley Elbers (yellow card) 64' (yellow-red card) 83'; Ryan Koolwijk (yellow card) 90+5'	Report; Matchreport	49' Mustafa Saymak; 65' Younes Namli	Stadium: Stadion Woudestein; Attendance: 4,069; Referee: Jeroen Manschot

12 December 2017 16	PEC Zwolle	1 – 1	AZ	Zwolle
	Dirk Marcellis (yellow card) 18'; Terell Ondaan 32'; Bram van Polen (penalty missed); Mustafa Saymak (yellow card) 89'	Report; Matchreport	34' Alireza Jahanbakhsh; (yellow card) 50' Guus Til; (yellow card) 78' Stijn Wuytens; (yellow card) 83' Fredrik Midtsjø; (yellow card) 86' Pantelis Hatzidiakos; (yellow card) 89' Mats Seuntjens	Stadium: MAC³PARK stadion Attendance: 12,875; Referee: Dennis Higler

16 December 2017 17	Willem II	2 – 3	PEC Zwolle	Tilburg
	Fran Sol 10'; Konstantinos Tsimikas (yellow card) 30'; Ben Rienstra 36'; Mattijs Branderhorst (yellow card) 39'; Ismail Azzaoui (yellow card) 56'	Report; Matchreport	(yellow card) 20' Dirk Marcellis; 40' (pen.) Erik Bakker; 59', 85' Mustafa Saymak; (yellow card) 88' Youness Mokhtar	Stadium: Koning Willem II Stadion; Attendance: 12,900; Referee: Reinold Weidemeijer

22 December 2017 18	ADO Den Haag	4 – 0	PEC Zwolle	The Hague
	Erik Falkenburg 23', 52'; Bjørn Johnsen 44', 62'	Report; Matchreport	(yellow card) 15' Bram van Polen; (yellow card) 45' Rick Dekker; (yellow card) 82' Stefan Nijland	Stadium: Kyocera Stadion; Attendance: 11,107; Referee: Kevin Blom

20 January 2018 19	PEC Zwolle	1 – 0	NAC Breda	Zwolle
	Youness Mokhtar 2'; Philippe Sandler (yellow card) 78'	Report; Matchreport	(yellow card) 90+2' Paolo Fernandes	Stadium: MAC³PARK stadion Attendance: 13,120; Referee: Jochem Kamphuis

27 January 2018 20	PEC Zwolle	1 – 2	Vitesse	Zwolle
	Younes Namli 58'; Kingsley Ehizibue (yellow card) 79'	Report; Matchreport	29' Bryan Linssen; 75' Mason Mount	Stadium: MAC³PARK stadion Attendance: 13,115; Referee: Siemen Mulder

3 February 2018 21	PSV	4 – 0	PEC Zwolle	Eindhoven
	Marco van Ginkel (yellow card) 20'; Luuk de Jong 45+3', 65', 72'; Joshua Brenet 78'	Report; Matchreport	(yellow card) 39' Nicolás Freire; (red card) 42' Mickey van der Hart	Stadium: Philips Stadion; Attendance: 32,800; Referee: Serdar Gözübüyük

6 February 2018 22	PEC Zwolle	3 – 2	SC Heerenveen	Zwolle
	Wouter Marinus 23'; Younes Namli 28'; Rick Dekker (yellow card) 35'; Mustafa Saymak 78'	Report; Matchreport	(yellow card) 53' Davy Bulthuis; 69' (yellow card) 85' Denzel Dumfries; 80' Reza Ghoochannejhad	Stadium: MAC³PARK stadion Attendance: 12,920; Referee: Pol van Boekel

10 February 2018 23	FC Utrecht	2 – 1	PEC Zwolle	Utrecht
	Rico Strieder (yellow card) 12'; Gyrano Kerk 17'; Zakaria Labyad 23' (yellow card) 37'	Report; Matchreport	(yellow card) 27' Wouter Marinus; (yellow card) 89' Younes Namli; 90+3' (pen.) Mustafa Saymak	Stadium: Stadion Galgenwaard; Attendance: 17,301; Referee: Reinold Wiedemeijer

18 February 2018 24	PEC Zwolle	0 – 1	AFC Ajax	Zwolle
	Philippe Sandler (yellow card) 82'	Report [ Matchreport]	54' Klaas-Jan Huntelaar; (yellow card) 68' Nicolás Tagliafico	Stadium: MAC³PARK stadion Attendance: 13,250; Referee: Kevin Blom

24 February 2018 25	Heracles Almelo	2 – 1	PEC Zwolle	Almelo
	Kristoffer Peterson 42'; Vincent Vermeij 62'	Report; Matchreport	49' Piotr Parzyszek	Stadium: Polman Stadion; Attendance: 9,031; Referee: Bas Nijhuis

4 March 2018 26	PEC Zwolle	1 – 1	VVV-Venlo	Zwolle
	Kingsley Ehizibue (yellow card) 35'; Rick Dekker (yellow card) 67'; Mustafa Saymak 73'; Youness Mokhtar (yellow card) 87'	Report; Matchreport	(yellow card) 59' Jerold Promes; (yellow card) 62' Danny Post; 68' (yellow card) 83' Vito van Crooy; (yellow card) 76' Moreno Rutten	Stadium: MAC³PARK stadion Attendance: 12,985; Referee: Jeroen Manschot

11 March 2018 27	FC Groningen	2 – 0	PEC Zwolle	Groningen
	Ryan Thomas 25' (o.g.); Django Warmerdam (yellow card) 31'; Ajdin Hrustić 90'	Report; Matchreport	(yellow card) 28' Erik Bakker; (yellow card) 74' Bram van Polen; (yellow card) 90+4' Sepp van den Berg	Stadium: Euroborg; Attendance: 17,896; Referee: Allard Lindhout

18 March 2018 28	PEC Zwolle	3 – 4	Feyenoord	Zwolle
	Mustafa Saymak 52'; Piotr Parzyszek 85' (pen.), 88'	Report; Matchreport	10', 15' Robin van Persie; 51' Karim El Ahmadi; (yellow card) 59' Steven Berghuis; 78' Tonny Vilhena	Stadium: MAC³PARK stadion Attendance: 13,250; Referee: Pol van Boekel

31 March 2018 29	PEC Zwolle	2 – 0	Sparta Rotterdam	Zwolle
	Youness Mokhtar 2'; Piotr Parzyszek 64'	Report; Matchreport	(yellow card) 28' Kenneth Dougall; (yellow card) 60' Robert Mühren; (yellow card) 61' Soufyan Ahannach	Stadium: MAC³PARK stadion Attendance: 13,250; Referee: Bas Nijhuis

7 April 2018 30	Roda JC Kerkrade	3 – 2	PEC Zwolle	Kerkrade
	Donis Avdijaj 3' (yellow card) 86'; Simon Gustafson 8'; Ognjen Gnjatić (yellow card) 32'; Adil Auassar (yellow card) 36'; Mikhail Rosheuvel 87'	Report; Matchreport	25' Younes Namli; (yellow card) 40' Dirk Marcellis; (yellow card) 47' Kingsley Ehizibue; 85' Queensy Menig	Stadium: Parkstad Limburg Stadion; Attendance: 14,115; Referee: Bas Kuipers

14 April 2018 31	PEC Zwolle	1 – 1	S.B.V. Excelsior	Zwolle
	Youness Mokhtar 17'; Philippe Sandler (yellow card) 38'; Kingsley Ehizibue (yellow card) 56'	Report; Matchreport	(yellow card) 37' Jurgen Mattheij; 57' (pen.) (yellow card) 84' Mike van Duinen; (yellow card) 90+3' Anouar Hadouir	Stadium: MAC³PARK stadion Attendance: 13,028; Referee: Christiaan Bax

17 April 2018 32	FC Twente	2 – 0	PEC Zwolle	Enschede
	Jeroen van der Lely 21'; Michaël Maria 35'; Thomas Lam (yellow card) 39'	Report; Matchreport	(yellow card) 31' Sepp van den Berg; (yellow card) 60' Youness Mokhtar; (yellow card) 63' Bram van Polen; (yellow card) 80' Ryan Thomas	Stadium: De Grolsch Veste; Attendance: 24,900; Referee: Pol van Boekel

29 April 2018 33	PEC Zwolle	0 – 1	Willem II	Zwolle
	Erik Bakker (yellow card) 89'	Report; Matchreport	66' Ismail Azzaoui	Stadium: MAC³PARK stadion Attendance: 13,055; Referee: Rob Dieperink

6 May 2018 34	AZ	6 – 0	PEC Zwolle	Alkmaar
	Alireza Jahanbakhsh 13', 52', 88'; Fredrik Midtsjø 62'; Wout Weghorst 76', 77'	Report; Matchreport	(yellow card) 35' Dirk Marcellis	Stadium: AFAS Stadion; Attendance: 16,532; Referee: Allard Lindhout

=== KNVB Cup ===
21 September 2017 First round	VV De Meern	0 – 5	PEC Zwolle	De Meern
		Report; Matchreport	11' Stefan Nijland; 32' Younes Namli; 39' (pen.) Piotr Parzyszek; 67' Wouter Marinus; 90+1' (pen.) Youness Mokhtar	Stadium: Sportpark De Meern; Attendance: 700; Referee: Serdar Gözübüyük

24 October 2017 Second round	PEC Zwolle	3 – 2 (a.e.t.)	Kozakken Boys	Zwolle
	Namli 8'; Thomas (yellow card) 56'; Sandler 77'; Ehizibue (yellow card) 86'; Marcellis (yellow card) 91'; Bakker 105+2' (pen.)	Report; Matchreport	Sanny Monteiro (yellow card) 15'; Ahmed El Azzouti 52'; Ahmad Mendes Moreira (yellow card) 84'; Gwaeron Stout 88' (yellow card) 90+2'; Toby Mulder (yellow card) 90+1'; Julian Agatowski (yellow card) 120+1'	Stadium: MAC³PARK stadion Attendance: 12,128; Referee: Joey Kooij

19 December 2017 Round of 16	PEC Zwolle	2 – 0	N.E.C.	Zwolle
	Erik Bakker (penalty missed); Youness Mokhtar 20'; Terell Ondaan 48'	Report; Matchreport	(yellow card) 2' Frank Sturing	Stadium: MAC³PARK stadion Attendance: 10,124; Referee: Björn Kuipers

31 January 2018 Quarter-final	AZ	4 – 1	PEC Zwolle	Alkmaar
	Wout Weghorst 21', 71'; Guus Til 39'; Oussama Idrissi 60'	Report; Matchreport	(yellow card) 23' Youness Mokhtar; 32' Wouter Marinus; (red card) 54' Diederik Boer	Stadium: AFAS Stadion; Attendance: 13,247; Referee: Bas Nijhuis

== Statistics ==
=== Squad details and appearances ===
Nr.	Nat.	Name	Eredivisie		KNVB Cup		Total		Contract end	Season	Signed from	Debut
Nr.	Nat.	Name	G	Goal	G	Goal	G	Goal	Contract end	Season	Signed from	Debut
Goalkeepers
1	(Netherlands)	Diederik Boer	33	0	2	0	35	0	2019	15th	(Netherlands) AFC Ajax	8 March 2003
16	(Netherlands)	Mickey van der Hart	1	0	3	0	4	0	2018	3rd	(Netherlands) AFC Ajax	24 September 2015
25	(Netherlands)	Kevin Reimink	0	0	0	0	0	0	Youth	1st	Academy	—
40	(Netherlands)	Mike Hauptmeijer	1	0	0	0	1	0	2018	2nd	Academy	3 February 2018
Defenders
2	(Netherlands)	Bram van Polen	29	3	3	0	32	3	2018	12th	(Netherlands) SBV Vitesse	12 October 2007
3	(Argentina)	Nicolás Freire	18	1	3	0	21	1	On loan	1st	(Uruguay) Club Atlético Torque	21 September 2017
3	(Netherlands)	Ted van de Pavert	0	0	0	0	0	0	2019	2nd	(Netherlands) De Graafschap	6 August 2016
4	(Netherlands)	Dirk Marcellis	28	1	4	0	32	1	2020	3rd	(Netherlands) NAC Breda	12 August 2015
5	(Netherlands)	Dico Koppers	2	0	0	0	2	0	2019	1st	(Netherlands) Willem II	20 August 2017
13	(Netherlands)	Philippe Sandler	23	0	3	1	26	1	2020	2nd	(Netherlands) AFC Ajax (Academy)	13 August 2016
17	(Czech Republic)	Josef Kvída	0	0	0	0	0	0	2018	3rd	(Czech Republic) 1. FK Příbram	4 December 2016
20	(Netherlands)	Kingsley Ehizibue	33	1	4	0	37	1	2018	4th	Academy	13 December 2014
21	(Netherlands)	Bart Schenkeveld	0	0	0	0	0	0	2018	3rd	(Netherlands) Heracles Almelo	12 August 2015
24	(Netherlands)	Ruben Ligeon	4	0	0	0	4	0	2020	1st	(Slovakia) ŠK Slovan Bratislava	27 January 2018
29	(Netherlands)	Sander van Looy	1	0	0	0	1	0	2018	3rd	Academy	22 December 2017
33	(Netherlands)	Sepp van den Berg	7	0	0	0	7	0	2020	1st	Academy	11 March 2018
34	(Netherlands)	Joran Swart	0	0	0	0	0	0	Youth	1st	Academy	—
35	(Netherlands)	Shaquile Woudstra	4	0	1	0	5	0	Youth	1st	(Netherlands) Jong FC Twente	9 December 2017
45	(Netherlands)	Mark Bruintjes	1	0	0	0	1	0	Youth	3rd	Academy	14 February 2016
Midfielders
6	(Netherlands)	Mustafa Saymak	31	11	2	0	33	11	2018	7th	Academy	5 August 2011
8	(Netherlands)	Wouter Marinus	13	1	4	1	17	2	2019	4th	(Netherlands) SC Heerenveen (Academy)	12 August 2015
14	(Sweden)	Erik Israelsson	12	0	2	0	14	0	2019	2nd	(Sweden) Hammarby IF	5 February 2017
19	(Netherlands)	Rick Dekker	30	0	3	0	33	0	2020	4th	(Netherlands) Feyenoord (Academy)	5 October 2014
21	(Denmark)	Younes Namli	32	5	4	2	36	7	2020	1st	(Netherlands) SC Heerenveen	13 August 2017
23	(Netherlands)	Erik Bakker	20	1	4	1	24	2	2019	5th	(Netherlands) SC Cambuur	10 August 2007
27	(Netherlands)	Tijjani Reijnders	1	0	0	0	1	0	Youth	1st	Academy	13 August 2017
30	(New Zealand)	Ryan Thomas	30	1	3	0	33	1	2019	5th	(New Zealand) Western Suburbs	2 November 2013
31	(Netherlands)	Bas van Wijnen	0	0	0	0	0	0	2019	1st	Academy	14 May 2017
Forwards
7	(Netherlands)	Youness Mokhtar	32	8	4	2	36	10	2018	5th	(Saudi Arabia) Al-Nassr	25 August 2012
9	(Netherlands)	Anass Achahbar	0	0	0	0	0	0	2020	2nd	(Netherlands) Feyenoord	6 August 2016
9	(Poland)	Piotr Parzyszek	23	5	2	1	25	6	2020	1st	(Netherlands) De Graafschap	13 August 2017
10	(Netherlands)	Stefan Nijland	16	1	2	1	18	2	2018	5th	(Netherlands) PSV	10 August 2013
11	(Netherlands)	Terell Ondaan	28	1	4	1	32	2	2020	1st	(Netherlands) S.B.V. Excelsior	9 September 2017
15	(Greece)	Thanasis Karagounis	1	0	0	0	1	0	2018	5th	(Greece) Atromitos	18 January 2014
17	(Netherlands)	Queensy Menig	13	1	0	0	13	1	On loan	3rd	(France) FC Nantes	12 August 2015
29	(Netherlands)	Rogier Benschop	2	0	0	0	2	0	Youth	1st	Academy	22 December 2017
No.	Nat.	Name	G	Goal	G	Goal	G	Goal	Contract end	Season	Signed from	Debut
No.	Nat.	Name	Eredivisie		KNVB Cup		Total		Contract end	Season	Signed from	Debut

=== Legend ===
#	Reason
	Left the club during the season
	Out on loan

== Transfers ==
=== In ===
#	Nat.	Name	From	Type	Date	Fee
Summer
23	(Netherlands)	Erik Bakker	(Netherlands) SC Cambuur	Free	30 June 2019	–
1	(Netherlands)	Diederik Boer	(Netherlands) AFC Ajax	Free	30 June 2019	–
3	(Argentina)	Nicolás Freire	(Uruguay) Club Atlético Torque	On loan	30 June 2019	–
5	(Netherlands)	Dico Koppers	(Netherlands) Willem II	Free	30 June 2019	–
21	(Denmark)	Younes Namli	(Netherlands) SC Heerenveen	Free	30 June 2020	–
11	(Netherlands)	Terell Ondaan	(Netherlands) S.B.V. Excelsior	Free	30 June 2018	–
9	(Poland)	Piotr Parzyszek	(Netherlands) De Graafschap	Free	30 June 2020	–
31	(Netherlands)	Bas van Wijnen	Youth Academy	–	30 June 2019	–
Winter
24	(Netherlands)	Ruben Ligeon	(Slovakia) ŠK Slovan Bratislava	Free	30 June 2020	–
17	(Netherlands)	Queensy Menig	(France) FC Nantes	On loan	30 June 2018	–

=== Out ===
#	Nat.	Name	To	Type	Fee	G	Goal
Summer
9	(Netherlands)	Anass Achahbar	(Netherlands) N.E.C.	On loan	–	20	1
16	(Belgium)	Kevin Begois	(Netherlands) FC Groningen	Free	–	32	0
15	(Netherlands)	Ouasim Bouy	(Italy) Juventus FC	End of loan	–	42	4
44	(Denmark)	Nicolai Brock-Madsen	(England) Birmingham City F.C.	End of loan	–	26	10
18	(Brazil)	Gustavo Hebling	(France) Paris Saint-Germain F.C.	End of loan	–	11	0
23	(Netherlands)	Danny Holla	(Netherlands) FC Twente	Free	–	53	11
17	(Czech Republic)	Josef Kvída	(Netherlands) Almere City FC	On Loan	–	2	0
98	(Morocco)	Hachim Mastour	(Italy) AC Milan	End of loan	–	6	0
11	(Netherlands)	Queensy Menig	(Netherlands) AFC Ajax	End of loan	–	57	12
35	(France)	Hervin Ongenda	Unknown	Contract ended	–	3	0
3	(Netherlands)	Ted van de Pavert	(Netherlands) N.E.C.	On loan	–	26	2
5	(Netherlands)	Calvin Verdonk	(Netherlands) Feyenoord	End of loan	–	17	0
21	(Netherlands)	Django Warmerdam	(Netherlands) AFC Ajax	End of loan	–	29	4
