= Benschop =

Benschop may refer to:

== People ==
- Albert Benschop (1949-2018), Dutch sociologist
- Anne Marie Benschop (born 1969), Dutch chess master
- Carla Benschop (1950-2006), Dutch basketball player
- Charlison Benschop (born 1989), Dutch footballer
- Dick Benschop (born 1957), Dutch politician and corporate executive
- Nel Benschop (1918-2005), Dutch poet
- Rogier Benschop (born 1998), Dutch professional footballer

== Places ==
- Benschop, Utrecht, Netherlands
