= Die Haghe =

Die Haghe can refer to:

- or Den Hag(h)e, an old name for The Hague
- Die Haghe, The Hague's historical society and publisher
- B.V. Drukkerij Die Haghe, printer (until 1998 in Voorburg)
- KV Die Haghe, a korfball club from The Hague
- SV Die Haghe, a football club from The Hague
