= Leonard Nienhuis =

Dutch footballer

Personal information
- Full name: Leonard Nienhuis
- Date of birth: 16 March 1990 (age 36)
- Place of birth: Groningen, Netherlands
- Height: 1.84 m (6 ft 0 in)
- Position: Goalkeeper

Youth career
- –2009: SC Cambuur
- 2009–2013: FC Groningen

Senior career*
Years	Team	Apps	(Gls)
2010–2013	FC Groningen	0	(0)
2011–2012	→ SC Veendam (loan)	34	(0)
2012–2013	→ SC Cambuur (loan)	8	(0)
2013–2017	SC Cambuur	104	(0)
2017–2018	Sparta Rotterdam	2	(0)

International career
2010	Netherlands U21	1	(0)
- * Club domestic league appearances and goals

Leonard Nienhuis (born 16 March 1990) is a former Dutch footballer who played as a goalkeeper. He formerly played for FC Groningen, SC Veendam and SC Cambuur.

== International career ==
Nienhuis is a one-time youth international for the Netherlands national under-21 football team on 17 November 2010.

== Honours ==
=== Club ===
SC Cambuur

- Eerste Divisie (1): 2012–13
