= Stef Nijland =

Dutch footballer

Stef Nĳland
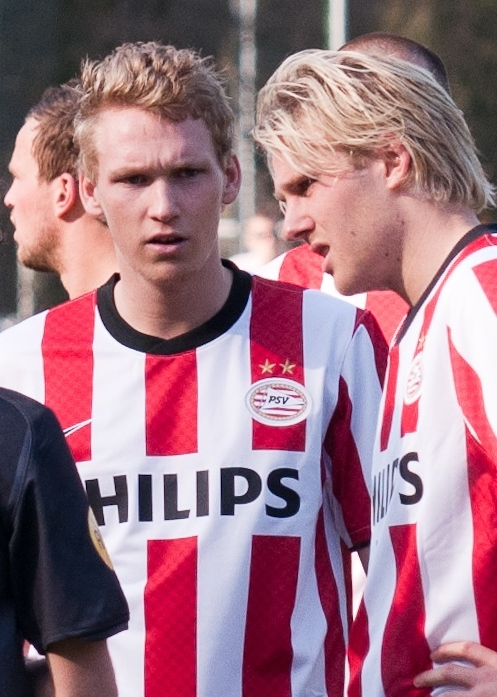
- Nijland (left) and then-teammate Ola Toivonen at PSV in 2011

Personal information
- Full name: Stefan Nĳland
- Date of birth: 10 August 1988 (age 38)
- Place of birth: Hoogezand, Netherlands
- Height: 1.87 m (6 ft 2 in)
- Position: Forward

Team information
- Current team: DVS '33
- Number: 10

Youth career
- 1997–2007: Groningen

Senior career*
Years	Team	Apps	(Gls)
2007–2008	Groningen	23	(4)
2008–2013	PSV	18	(1)
2009–2010	→ Willem II (loan)	16	(4)
2011–2012	→ NEC (loan)	15	(1)
2013	→ Brisbane Roar (loan)	10	(0)
2013–2018	PEC Zwolle	108	(20)
2018–2020	De Graafschap	35	(5)
2020–	DVS '33	112	(38)
- * Club domestic league appearances and goals as of 11 January 2026

Stefan Nĳland (born 10 August 1988) is a Dutch professional footballer who plays as a forward for Derde Divisie club DVS '33.

== Career ==
=== Groningen ===
Born in Hoogezand, Nĳland began his professional career during the 2007–08 season with Groningen and signed a contract with the club until 2009.

Nijland made his Groningen debut, where he set up one of the goals, in a 3–0 win against NAC Breda in the opening game of the season on 18 August 2007. He also made his European debut, where he played the whole game, in a 1–1 draw against Fiorentina on 20 September 2007. He continued to make a handful of first team appearances and then scored his first goals for the club, in an 8–1 win over IJsselmeervogels in the second round of KNVB Cup on 26 September 2007. However, he suffered an injury, which he sustained in training and was sidelined for months. After two months on the sidelines, he made his first team return on 9 December 2007, coming on as a substitute in the second half, in a 4–2 loss against Heerenveen. Two weeks later on 22 December 2007, he scored his first Groningen league goal and set up one of the goals, in a 2–1 win over Heracles Almelo. Seven days later on 29 December 2007, Nijland scored a brace, in a 3–1 win over Sparta Rotterdam, followed up by setting up two goals, in a 3–2 win over Excelsior in the next game. For his performance, Nijland signed a contract extension with the club, keeping him until 2012 and revealed that he turned down a move to join Ajax in the January transfer window, where he could have joined alongside Bruno Silva and Rasmus Lindgren. Nijland then scored again on 24 February 2008, in a 3–1 win over VVV-Venlo. Despite suffering from ankle injury, Nijland finished his first season at Groningen, making twenty–three appearances and scoring six times in all competition.

=== PSV Eindhoven ===
On 24 August 2008, Nijland left Groningen when he was transferred to PSV for a fee of €4 million, signing a five–year contract, keeping him until 2013.

Nijland then made his PSV debut, where he made his first start for the club and played for 55 minutes before being substituted, in a 1–0 win over Sparta Rotterdam. After missing out one match, he returned and set up one of the goals, in a 3–2 loss against Roda JC on 25 October 2008. It wasn't until on 29 November 2008 when he scored his first goal for the club, in a 2–2 draw against Heerenveen. In his second meeting against his former club Groningen on 21 February 2009, Nijland came on as a late substitute in the second half and scored a winning goal, in a 1–0 win. However, as the 2008–09 season progressed, his first team opportunities was limited, as he appeared most of the time on the substitute bench before an injury forced him out for the rest of the season. In his first season at PSV, he went on to make nineteen appearances and scoring once in all competitions.

In the 2009–10 season, Nijland made one appearance for PSV, where he came on as a substitute in the second half, in a 2–0 win over Roda JC in the third round of KNVB Cup. Following his loan spell at Willem II came to an end, he scored on his first appearance for the club in the 2010–11 season, in a 3–0 win over Sparta Rotterdam in second round of KNVB Cup. Nijland went on to make seven appearances in the 2010–11 season in all competition.

After being told by the club's technical manager Marcel Brands that he would not be at the club next season, Nijland returned to the club at the end of the 2011–12 season and was linked with a move to German side 1860 Munich and even started a negotiation between the two parties, but remained at PSV Eindhoven after he rejected a move to the club.

At the end of the 2012–13 season, Nijland was released by the club after being told that his contract would not be renewed.

=== Loan spells ===
On 24 December 2009, PSV loaned Nijland to Willem II for the remainder of the 2009–10 season. Nijland made his Willem II debut on 13 January 2010 in a friendly match against UD Ojen, where he scored five goals, in a 9–1 victory for the club. Ten days later on 23 January 2010, he scored on his league debut for Willem II, in a 4–2 loss against Heerenveen, followed up by scoring his second on 29 January 2010, in a 2–1 win against RKC Waalwijk. He went on to score two more goals later in the season against NEC, Sparta Rotterdam and Eindhoven. At the end of the 2009–10 season, Nijland helped the club survive relegation to ensure that Willem II stayed in the top–flight football for another season and scored five times in twenty appearances.

On 25 May 2011, PSV loaned Nijland to NEC Nijmegen for the 2011/12 season. Nijland scored on his debut in the opening game of the season, in a 2–2 draw against Heerenveen. He scored his second goal of the season, in the second round of KNVB Cup, in a 4–1 win over Fortuna Sittard on 20 September 2011. However, Nijland suffered injuries as the 2011–12 season and went on to make nineteen appearances and scoring two times in the 2011–12 season in all competition.

On 28 January 2013, Nĳland went to Australian club Brisbane Roar on a four-month loan deal. Nijland made his debut for Brisbane in round 19 against Central Coast Mariners in a 2–2 draw. Despite keen on signing for the club on a permanent basis, Nijland failed to score a single goal in his ten appearances at the club and at the end of the 2012–13 season, he returned to his parent club.

=== PEC Zwolle ===
After leaving PSV Eindhoven, Nijland signed for newly promoted side PEC Zwolle, signing a three–year contract, keeping him until 2016. Upon joining the club, Nijland re–joined Manager Ron Jans from his time at Groningen.

Nijland made his PEC Zwolle debut, where he came on as a late substitute, in a 3–0 win over Hercales, It wasn't until on 1 September 2013 when he scored his first PEC Zwolle goal, in a 1–1 draw against Utrecht. His second goal then came on 8 December 2013, in a 4–1 loss against Go Ahead Eagles. However, his first season at PEC Zwolle was a disappointment for him, as his first team opportunities was limited and restricted into making twenty–five appearances and scoring two times in all competition.

Frustrated with a lack of first team opportunities last season, Nijland considered leaving the club ahead of the 2014–15 season Despite this, Nijland was named in the starting eleven in the 2014 Dutch Supercup-game between PEC and Ajax, where he scored the winning goal in a 1–0 win, giving PEC its first ever Supercup win and himself his second major trophy at the club. Following the match, his performance was praised by the club's director Gerard Nijkamp. Niljand's season proved was an improvement for him, as he was given more first team opportunities and by the first half of the season, he scored five times in seventeen appearances against Vitesse (in addition to being named Man of the Match by Voetbal International, Heracles Almelo, Go Ahead Eagles and Excelsior (twice). At the start of 2015, he scored three more goals against Utrecht and Dordrecht before receiving a straight red card, in a 1–0 loss against Go Ahead Eagles on 15 February 2015. After serving a two match suspension, Nijland returned to the first team on 7 March 2015 and scored a hat–trick of his career, in a 6–1 win over Cambuur despite playing for twenty–one minutes during the match. Despite suffering an injury towards the end of the 2014–15 season, Nijland finished the 2014–15 season, making thirty–eight appearances and scoring thirteen times in all competitions, making him the club's topscorer.

In the 2015–16 season, Niljand continued to be in the first team regular despite facing new competitions and it wasn't until on 7 November 2015 when he scored his first goal of the season, in a 1–1 draw against Heracules Almelo, followed up by scoring in a 5–0 win over Roda JC. As the 2015–16 season progressed, Niljand went on to score four more goals against Heerenveen, De Graafschap (twice) and Willem II. As a result, Niljand signed a contract extension with the club, keeping him until 2018. Despite suffering from injuries as the 2015–16 season progressed, Nijland finished the 2015–16 season, making twenty–seven appearances and scoring six times in all competitions.

In the 2016–17 season, Nijland appeared in the first three matches to the season before a thigh injury, which he sustained during a 4–0 defeat to PSV Eindhoven.

== International career ==
In May 2008, Nijland was called up by the B Team.

== Personal life ==
He is the son of Hans Nĳland, the former managing director of FC Groningen.

In addition to playing football, Nijland said he has been taking Spanish classes in an interview with Goal.com. Stef also revealed that he's often being called Stefan than Stef.

== Career statistics ==
As of match played on 28 February 2020

Appearances and goals by club, season and competition
Club	Season	League			Cup		Continental		Other		Total	
Club	Season	Division	Apps	Goals	Apps	Goals	Apps	Goals	Apps	Goals	Apps	Goals
Groningen	2007–08	Eredivisie	23	4	0	0	—		—		23	4
PSV	2008–09	Eredivisie	14	1	0	0	3 (Note: Appearances in UEFA Champions League)	0	—		17	1
PSV	2009–10	Eredivisie	0	0	1	0	—		—		1	0
PSV	2010–11	Eredivisie	4	0	2	1	1 (Note: Appearance in UEFA Europa League)	0	—		7	1
PSV	Total		18	1	3	1	4	0	—		25	2
Willem II (loan)	2009–10	Eredivisie	16	4	0	0	—		4 (Note: Appearances in Promotion/relegation play-offs)	1	20	5
NEC (loan)	2011–12	Eredivisie	15	1	2	1	—		—		17	2
Brisbane Roar (loan)	2012–13	A-League	10	0	—		1 (Note: Appearance in AFC Champions League)	0	—		11	0
PEC Zwolle	2013–14	Eredivisie	23	2	1	0	—		—		24	2
PEC Zwolle	2014–15	Eredivisie	30	11	5	0	2 (Note: Appearances in UEFA Europa League)	1	1 (Note: Appearances in Johan Cruyff Shield)	1	38	13
PEC Zwolle	2015–16	Eredivisie	26	6	1	0	—		—		27	6
PEC Zwolle	2016–17	Eredivisie	13	0	0	0	—		—		13	0
PEC Zwolle	2017–18	Eredivisie	16	1	2	1	—		—		18	2
PEC Zwolle	Total		108	20	9	1	2	1	1	1	120	23
De Graafschap	2018–19	Eredivisie	14	2	2	0	—		0	0	16	2
De Graafschap	2019–20	Eerste Divisie	21	3	0	0	—		—		21	3
De Graafschap	Total		35	5	2	0	—		0	0	37	5
Career totals			225	35	16	3	7	1	5	2	253	41
