= Jergé Hoefdraad =

Dutch footballer (1986–2021)

Personal information
- Date of birth: 17 July 1986
- Place of birth: Amsterdam, Netherlands
- Date of death: 3 August 2021 (aged 35)
- Height: 1.70 m (5 ft 7 in)
- Position: Left winger

Youth career
- –1996: Abcoude
- 1996–2004: Ajax
- 2004–2007: RKC

Senior career*
Years	Team	Apps	(Gls)
2007–2009	RKC	4	(0)
2009–2011	Almere City	57	(3)
2011–2013	Telstar	56	(6)
2013–2015	Almere City	51	(5)
2015–2017	Cambuur	43	(6)
2017–2019	Almere City	36	(4)
2021	De Volewijckers	0	(0)
Total		247	(24)
- * Club domestic league appearances and goals

Jergé Hoefdraad (17 July 1986 – 3 August 2021) was a Dutch professional footballer who last played as a left winger for Dutch club De Volewijckers. He formerly played for RKC Waalwijk, Almere City, Telstar and Cambuur.

== Death ==
On 1 August 2021, Hoefdraad was accidentally shot at a party in Amsterdam-Zuidoost, while trying to calm a quarrel. He was admitted to a hospital in critical condition. The next day, authorities had reported him to be dead, but they later clarified he was still in critical condition. However, he died in the hospital on 3 August 2021. Perpetrator Robin R. was later sentenced to 4 years in prison for reckless conduct.
