= Terell Ondaan =

Guyanese footballer

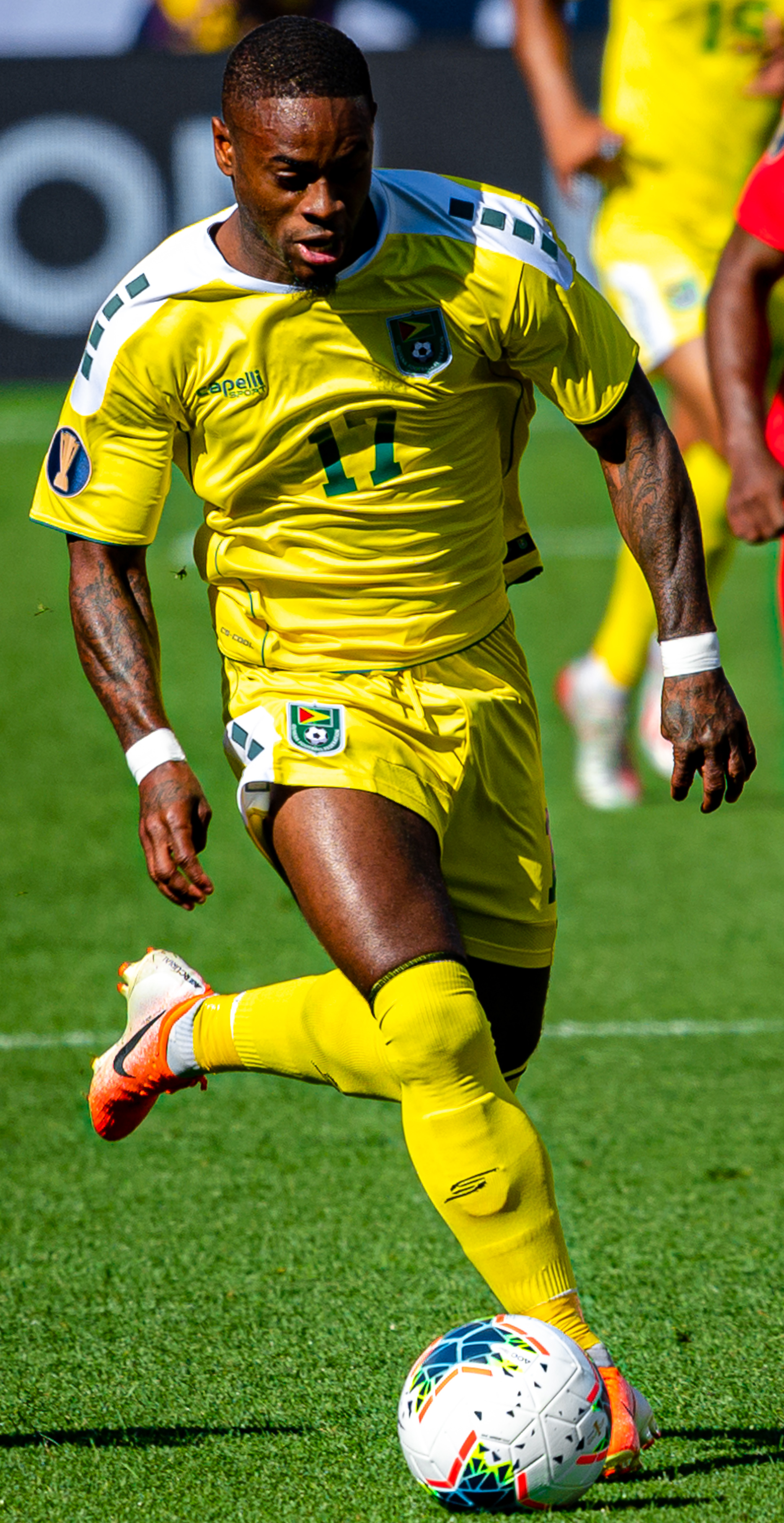
- Ondaan with Guyana at the 2019 CONCACAF Gold Cup

Personal information
- Full name: Terell Lionel Ondaan
- Date of birth: 9 September 1993 (age 33)
- Place of birth: Amsterdam, Netherlands
- Height: 1.73 m (5 ft 8 in)
- Position: Winger

Youth career
- –2004: CTO '70
- 2004–2008: Ajax
- 2008–2010: Haarlem
- 2010–2011: Ajax
- 2011–2013: AZ

Senior career*
Years	Team	Apps	(Gls)
2013	Telstar	3	(4)
2013–2016	Willem II	78	(9)
2016–2017	Excelsior	25	(0)
2017–2018	PEC Zwolle	29	(1)
2018–2019	Telstar	30	(13)
2019–2021	Grenoble	30	(3)
2020–2021	→ NEC (loan)	17	(4)
2021–2022	FC U Craiova	24	(1)
2024–2025	Ajax Amateurs	6	(0)

International career
2011	Netherlands U18	3	(0)
2014	Netherlands U21	2	(0)
2019–2022	Guyana	8	(0)
- * Club domestic league appearances and goals as of 01:49, 26 January 2026 (UTC)

Terell Lionel Ondaan (born 9 September 1993) is a professional footballer who plays as a winger. Born in the Netherlands, he plays for the Guyana national team.

== Club career ==
=== Early career ===
Born in Amsterdam, Ondaan played in the youth academies from HFC Haarlem, AFC Ajax and AZ Alkmaar. In 2011, he had to leave Ajax and he was signed by AZ. He never played a professional match for AZ.

=== Telstar ===
In the summer of 2013 he moved to SC Telstar, where he signed an amateur contract. He only played three matches in which he scored four times for Telstar, before he was signed by Willem II.

=== Willem II ===
Willem II sold winger Virgil Misidjan to PFC Ludogorets Razgrad and wanted Ondaan to replace him. Because Ondaan had an amateur contract with Telstar, Willem II was able to sign Ondaan without any transfer fee. He transferred to his new club only two months after signing for Telstar. He made his debut for Willem II on 23 August 2013 against Sparta Rotterdam (3–0 win). His in June 2016 expiring contract was not extended.

On 11 October 2018, Ondaan joined Eerste Divisie side Telstar on a deal until 2020.

=== U Craiova ===
On 14 August 2021, he moved to FC U Craiova in Romania.

== International career ==
Ondaan represented Netherlands during the 2015 UEFA European Under-21 Championship qualification Group 3 campaign, playing against Georgia during September 2014.

In May 2019, he was named on the Guyana national football team's provisional list for the 2019 CONCACAF Gold Cup. He made his debut on 6 June 2019 in a 0–1 friendly loss to Bermuda.

== Career statistics ==
As of match played on 16 May 2022

Appearances and goals by club, season and competition
Club	Season	League			Cup		Other		Total	
Club	Season	Division	Apps	Goals	Apps	Goals	Apps	Goals	Apps	Goals
Telstar	2013–14	Eerste Divisie	3	4	—		—		3	4
Willem II	2013–14	Eerste Divisie	34	6	1	0	—		35	6
Willem II	2014–15	Eredivisie	33	2	—		—		33	2
Willem II	2015–16	Eredivisie	11	1	—		1 (Note: Appearance in Promotion/relegation play-offs)	0	12	1
Willem II	Total		78	9	1	0	1	0	80	9
Excelsior	2016–17	Eredivisie	25	0	1	0	—		26	0
PEC Zwolle	2017–18	Eredivisie	28	1	4	1	0	0	32	2
PEC Zwolle	2018–19	Eredivisie	1	0	—		—		1	0
PEC Zwolle	Total		29	1	4	1	0	0	33	2
Telstar	2018–19	Eerste Divisie	30	13	—		—		30	13
Grenoble	2019–20	Ligue 2	24	2	1	0	2 (Note: Appearance in Coupe de la Ligue)	0	27	2
Grenoble	2020–21	Ligue 2	4	1	—		—		4	1
Grenoble	2021–22	Ligue 2	2	0	—		—		2	0
Grenoble	Total		30	3	1	0	2	0	33	3
NEC (loan)	2020–21	Eerste Divisie	17	4	0	0	2 (Note: Appearance in Promotion/relegation play-offs)	0	19	4
FC U Craiova	2021–22	Liga I	24	1	2	1	—		26	2
Career total			236	35	9	2	5	0	250	37

=== International ===
As of 14 June 2022

Appearances and goals by national team and year
National team	Year	Apps	Goals
Guyana	2019	4	0
Guyana	2020	0	0
Guyana	2021	0	0
Guyana	2022	5	0
Total		9	0

== Honours ==
Willem II

- Eerste Divisie: 2013–14
