= Bruno Andrade (footballer, born 1989) =

Brazilian footballer

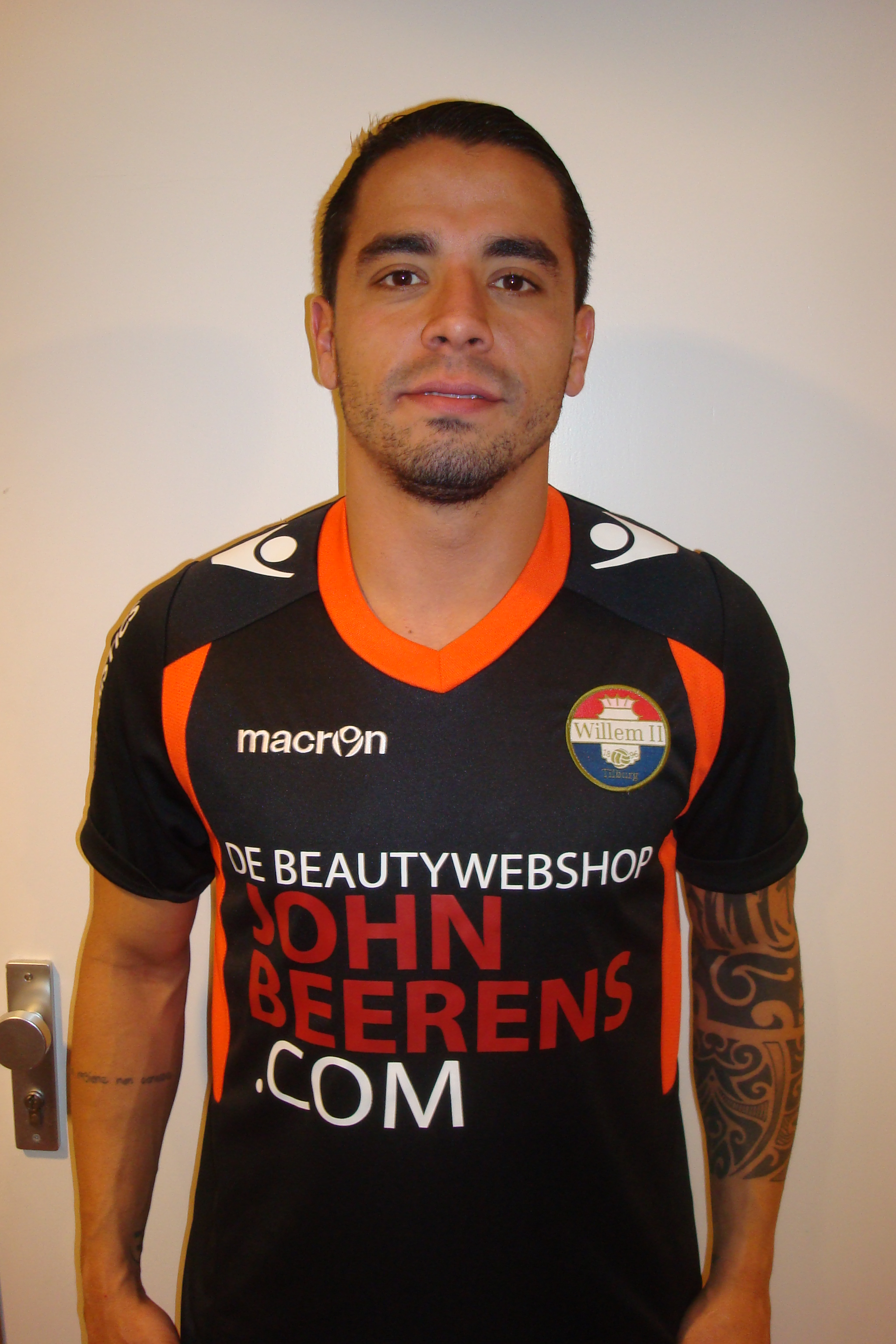

Personal information
- Full name: Bruno Fernandes Andrade de Brito
- Date of birth: 2 March 1989 (age 37)
- Place of birth: São Bernardo do Campo, Brazil
- Height: 1.76 m (5 ft 9 in)
- Position: Forward

Team information
- Current team: Lommel (assistant)

Youth career
- 2004–2007: Pão de Açúcar

Senior career*
Years	Team	Apps	(Gls)
2007–2009	Pão de Açúcar	5	(2)
2008	→ Reggina (loan)	0	(0)
2008–2009	→ Helmond Sport (loan)	28	(3)
2009–2011	Helmond Sport	76	(22)
2011–2013	Sint-Truiden	16	(4)
2013	Audax Rio	4	(0)
2013–2016	Willem II	76	(19)
2017	Hapoel Kfar Saba	7	(0)
2017	Birkirkara	11	(2)
2018–2019	Go Ahead Eagles	24	(3)
2019–2020	Esperanza Pelt		
2020–2021	Halsteren		

Managerial career
- 2019–2020: Willem II (U19 assistant)
- 2020–2021: Willem II (U21 assistant)
- 2021: Willem II (U17 manager)
- 2021–2022: Willem II (U21 manager)
- 2022–: Lommel (assistant)
- * Club domestic league appearances and goals

Bruno Fernandes Andrade de Brito (born 2 March 1989) is a Brazilian football coach and former player who is the assistant manager of Lommel.

A forward, Andrade played in Brazil, Italy, the Netherlands, Belgium, Israel, and Malta for Pão de Açúcar, Reggina, Helmond Sport, Sint-Truiden, Audax Rio, Willem II, Hapoel Kfar Saba, Birkirkara, Go Ahead Eagles, Esperanza Pelt and Halsteren.

== Career ==
Born in São Bernardo do Campo, Andrade began his senior career in 2007 with PAEC. In February 2008 he was loaned out to Italian side Reggina, and spent the entire 2008-09 season on loan at Dutch team Helmond Sport. After the loan spell ended, Helmond made the deal permanent. On 20 December 2010, Andrade was linked with Italian Serie B club Atalanta.

On 29 January 2017 Andrade signed to Hapoel Kfar Saba until the end of the season.

== Later career ==
Ahead of the 2019–20 season, Andrade joined Belgian club KFC Esperanza Pelt. Beside that, he was also appointed assistant manager of Willem II's U19s.

On 19 June 2020, Andrade signed with RKSV Halsteren competing in the Hoofdklasse. Beside that, he would also function as assistant manager of Willem II's U21s. In June 2021, he took charge of Willem II's U17s. In October 2021, Andrade left RKSV Halsteren, where he had played since 2020 beside his coaching duties, as he had accepted a new job offer to become Willem II's U21 manager.

At the end of July 2022, Andrade left Willem II to join Lommel S.K. as an assistant manager under manager Steve Bould.
