= Samuel Armenteros =

Swedish footballer

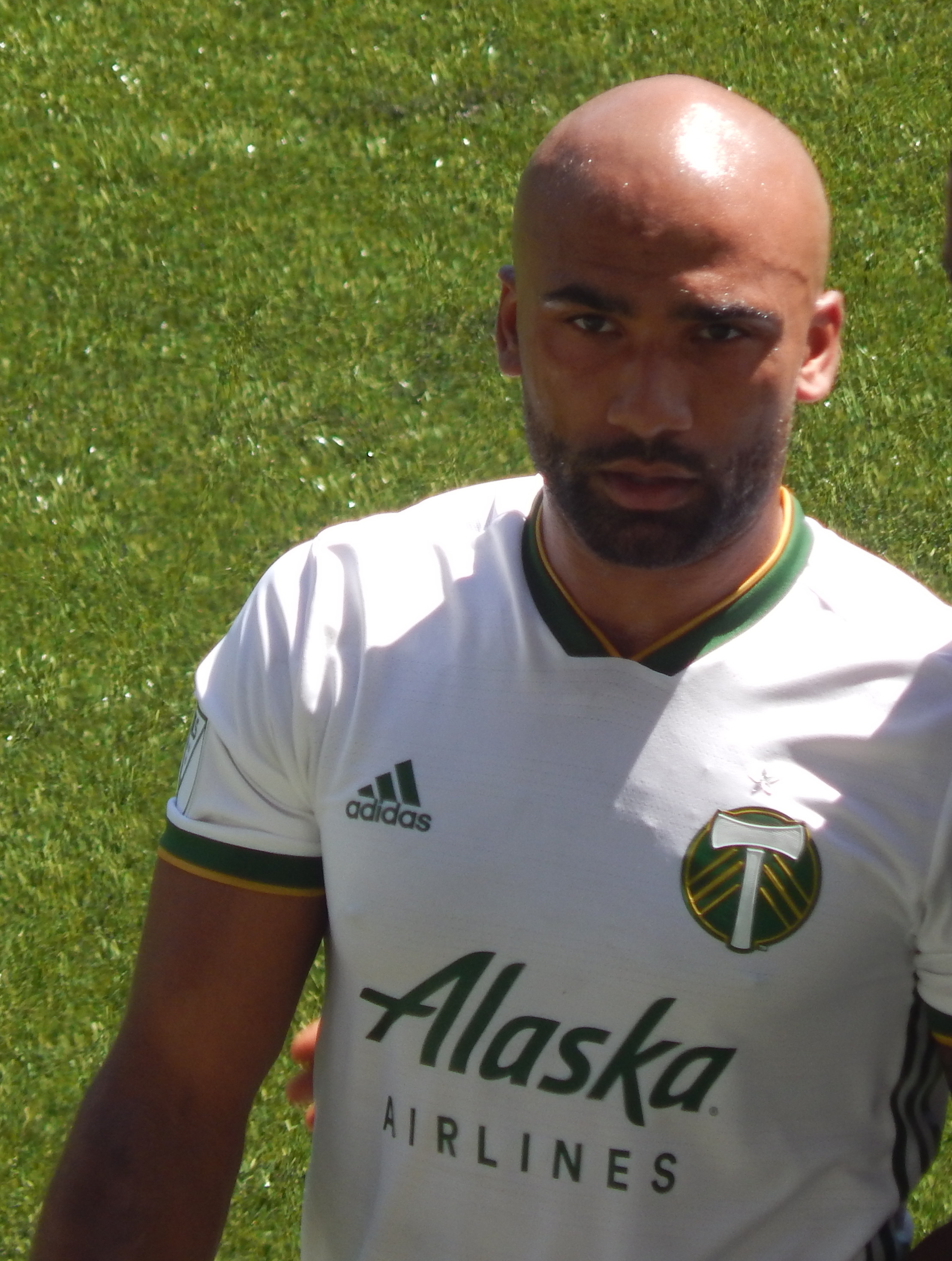
- Armenteros with Portland Timbers in 2018

Personal information
- Full name: Kristian Samuel Armenteros Nunez Jansson
- Date of birth: 27 May 1990 (age 36)
- Place of birth: Gothenburg, Sweden
- Height: 1.78 m (5 ft 10 in)
- Position: Striker

Youth career
- –1999: Azalea BK
- 2000–2003: Örgryte IS
- 2003–2006: Husqvarna FF
- 2006–2008: Heerenveen

Senior career*
Years	Team	Apps	(Gls)
2008–2009	Heerenveen	0	(0)
2009–2013	Heracles Almelo	97	(24)
2013–2015	Anderlecht	5	(1)
2013–2014	→ Feyenoord (loan)	19	(1)
2014–2015	→ Willem II (loan)	29	(11)
2015–2016	Qarabağ	23	(7)
2016–2017	Heracles Almelo	29	(19)
2017–2020	Benevento	34	(7)
2018	→ Portland Timbers (loan)	28	(8)
2020	→ Crotone (loan)	11	(3)
2020–2021	Fujairah	22	(8)
2021–2023	Heracles Almelo	43	(18)
2023–2024	Al-Kholood	16	(2)
2024	Shenzhen Peng City	12	(2)

International career
2005–2006	Sweden U17	3	(2)
2008	Sweden U19	5	(0)
2011–2012	Sweden U21	10	(1)
2017	Sweden	2	(1)
- * Club domestic league appearances and goals as of 15:52, 29 June 2024 (UTC)

Kristian Samuel Armenteros Nunez Jansson (born 27 May 1990), known as Samuel Armenteros, is a Swedish professional footballer who plays as a striker.

== Club career ==
Born in Masthugget, Gothenburg, Sweden, to a Cuban father and a Swedish mother, Armenteros moved to the Netherlands at age 16 to join SC Heerenveen's youth system, and made it into the first team under head coach Gertjan Verbeek. He was successively released by Heerenveen in 2009, and later chose to rejoin Verbeek at Heracles Almelo, where he showed himself as a promising striker and managed to score his first Eredivisie goals.

In September 2015, Armenteros signed a two-year contract with reigning Azerbaijan Premier League Champions FK Qarabağ.

On 29 August 2016, Armenteros returned to Heracles Almelo, signing a one-year contract with the club.

=== Benevento ===
On 30 August 2017, Armenteros signed a contract with Serie A team Benevento. Armenteros struggled at Benevento, getting little playing time, and looked for a transfer in January 2018. Before departing for Benevento in August, he played 45 minutes for Heracles's B team while recovering from injury, meaning that he had officially played for two teams on the fall-through-spring league calendar. Under FIFA rules, he couldn't play for a third team that used that calendar, and any transfer would require going to a league that plays on a spring-to-fall calendar.

==== Loan to Portland Timbers ====
In February 2018, Armenteros was loaned by Benevento to Portland Timbers of Major League Soccer. He won MLS's Goal of the Week twice in a row in May 2018. His loan contract expired on 31 December 2018, and he returned to Benevento.

==== Loan to Crotone ====
On 30 January 2020, he joined Crotone on loan.

=== Fujairah ===
On 5 October 2020, Armenteros signed with Emirati club Fujairah.

=== Second return to Heracles Almelo ===
On 31 January 2022, Armenteros returned to Heracles Almelo until the end of the 2021–22 season, with an option to extend.

=== Al-Kholood ===
On 11 August 2023, Armenteros joined Saudi Arabian club Al-Kholood. On 14 January 2024, Armenteros was released from his contract.

=== Shenzhen Peng City ===
On 29 February 2024, Armenteros joined Chinese Super League club Shenzhen Peng City.

== International career ==
Having appeared for the Sweden U17, U19, and U21 teams a total of 18 times, Armenteros made his full international debut for Sweden on 13 June 2017 in a friendly 1–1 draw with Norway. He also scored first his international goal in that game, 13 minutes after coming on as a substitute for John Guidetti.

Armenteros made his competitive international debut for Sweden on 31 August 2017 in a 2018 FIFA World Cup qualifier against Bulgaria when he replaced Jakob Johansson in the 82nd minute of a 3–2 loss.

== Personal life ==
Born in Sweden, Armenteros is of Afro-Cubans descent.

== Career statistics ==
=== Club ===
As of match played 7 January 2023

Appearances and goals by club, season and competition
Club	Season	League			Cup		Continental		Other		Total	
Club	Season	Division	Apps	Goals	Apps	Goals	Apps	Goals	Apps	Goals	Apps	Goals
Heracles Almelo	2009–10	Eredivisie	14	3	0	0	—		1 (Note: Appearance(s) in Eredivisie European play-offs)	0	15	3
Heracles Almelo	2010–11	Eredivisie	32	8	1	0	—		2	2	35	10
Heracles Almelo	2011–12	Eredivisie	33	4	5	2	—		—		38	6
Heracles Almelo	2012–13	Eredivisie	18	9	3	4	—		—		21	13
Heracles Almelo	Total		97	24	9	6	0	0	3	2	109	32
Anderlecht	2012–13	Belgian Pro League	3	1	1	0	—		—		4	1
Anderlecht	2013–14	Belgian Pro League	2	0	0	0	—		1 (Note: Appearance in Belgian Super Cup)	0	3	0
Anderlecht	Total		5	1	1	0	0	0	1	0	7	1
Feyenoord (loan)	2013–14	Eredivisie	19	1	3	1	2 (Note: Appearances in UEFA Europa League)	0	—		24	2
Willem II (loan)	2014–15	Eredivisie	29	11	1	0	—		—		30	11
Qarabağ	2015–16	Azerbaijan Premier League	23	7	3	3	6	1	—		32	11
Heracles Almelo	2016–17	Eredivisie	29	19	3	2	—		—		32	21
Benevento	2017–18	Serie A	9	1	—		—		—		9	1
Benevento	2018–19	Serie B	13	4	0	0	—		1 (Note: Appearance in Serie B promotion play-offs)	0	14	4
Benevento	2019–20	Serie B	12	2	1	0	—		—		13	2
Benevento	Total		134	45	11	6	8	1	1	0	154	52
Portland Timbers (loan)	2018	MLS	28	8	2	0	—		0	0	30	8
Crotone (loan)	2019–20	Serie B	11	3	—		—		—		11	3
Fujairah	2020–21	UAE Pro League	22	8	1	0	—		4 (Note: Appearances in UAE League Cup)	1	27	9
Heracles Almelo	2021–22	Eredivisie	9	1	—		—		2 (Note: Appearance(s) in Eredivisie relegation play-offs)	0	11	1
Heracles Almelo	2022–23	Eerste Divisie	18	10	1	0	—		—		19	10
Heracles Almelo	Total		88	30	4	0	0	0	6	1	98	31
Career total			334	100	25	12	8	1	11	3	378	116

=== International ===
As of match played 31 August 2017

Appearances and goals by national team and year
National team	Year	Apps	Goals
Sweden	2017	2	1
Total		2	1

Scores and results list Sweden's goal tally first, score column indicates score after each Armenteros goal.

List of international goals scored by Samuel Armenteros
No.	Date	Venue	Opponent	Score	Result	Competition
1	13 June 2017	Ullevaal Stadion, Oslo, Norway	Norway	1–1	1–1	Friendly

== Honours ==
Anderlecht

- Belgian First Division: 2012–13

Qarabağ

- Azerbaijan Premier League: 2015–16
- Azerbaijan Cup: 2015-16

Heracles Almelo

- Eerste Divisie: 2022–23

Individual

- Eerste Divisie Team of the Year: 2022–23
