= Robbie Haemhouts =

Belgian footballer

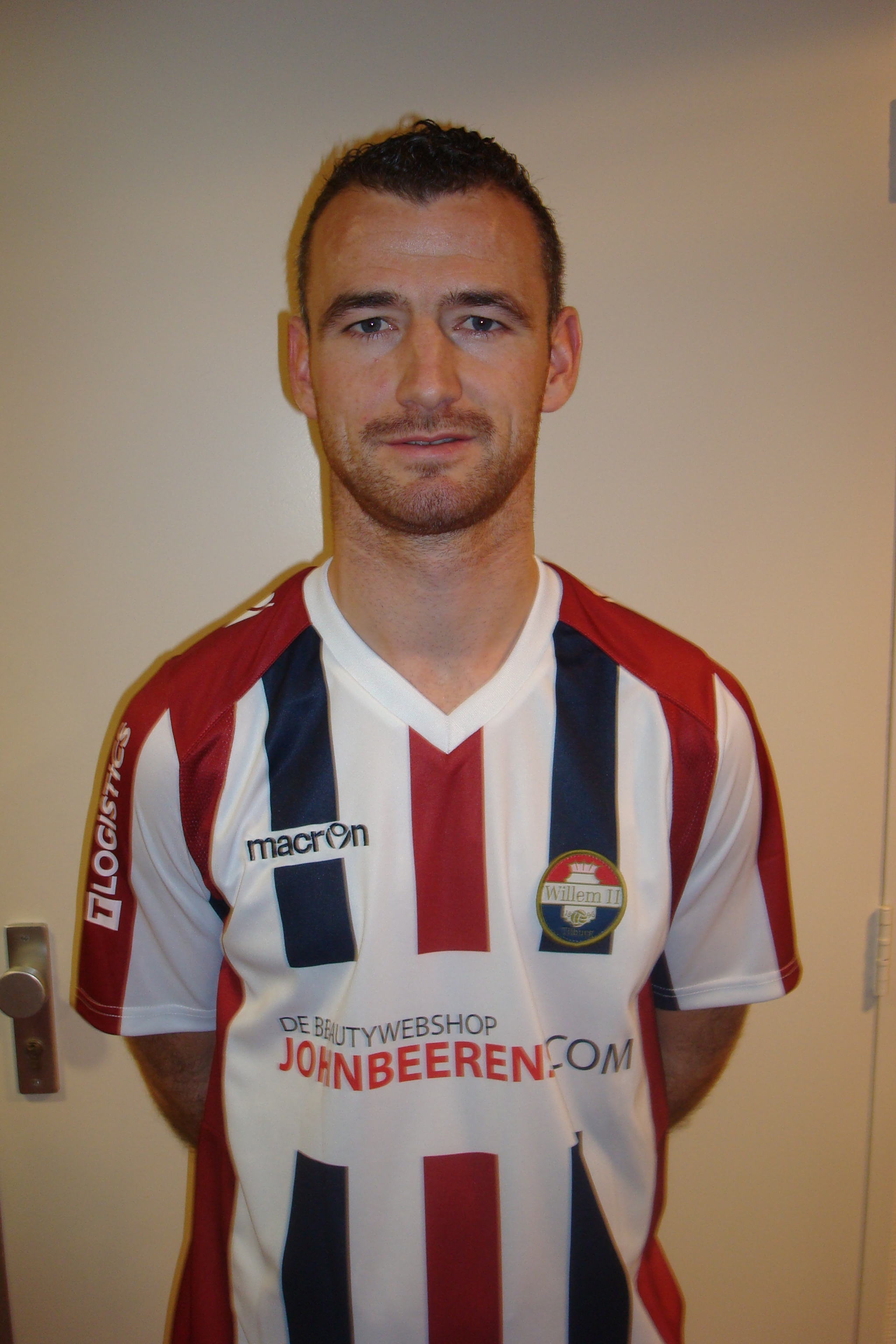

Personal information
- Full name: Robbie Haemhouts
- Date of birth: 9 December 1983 (age 42)
- Place of birth: Brasschaat, Belgium
- Height: 1.74 m (5 ft 9 in)
- Position: Midfielder

Youth career
- Zwarte Leeuw
- NAC

Senior career*
| Years | Team | Apps | (Gls) |
| 2001–2004 | NAC Breda | 3 | (0) |
| 2004–2007 | Den Bosch | 84 | (8) |
| 2007–2009 | Emmen | 54 | (5) |
| 2009–2010 | Almere City | 37 | (9) |
| 2010–2011 | Helmond Sport | 32 | (6) |
| 2011–2016 | Willem II | 134 | (15) |
| 2016–2019 | NAC Breda | 27 | (5) |
| Total | | 371 | (48) |
- * Club domestic league appearances and goals as of 7 January 2019

Robbie Haemhouts (born 9 December 1983) is a Belgian former professional footballer who plays as a midfielder.

== Honours ==
=== Club ===
Willem II

- Eerste Divisie (1): 2013–14
