= Nel Benschop =

Dutch poet (1918–2005)

Nelly Anna Benschop
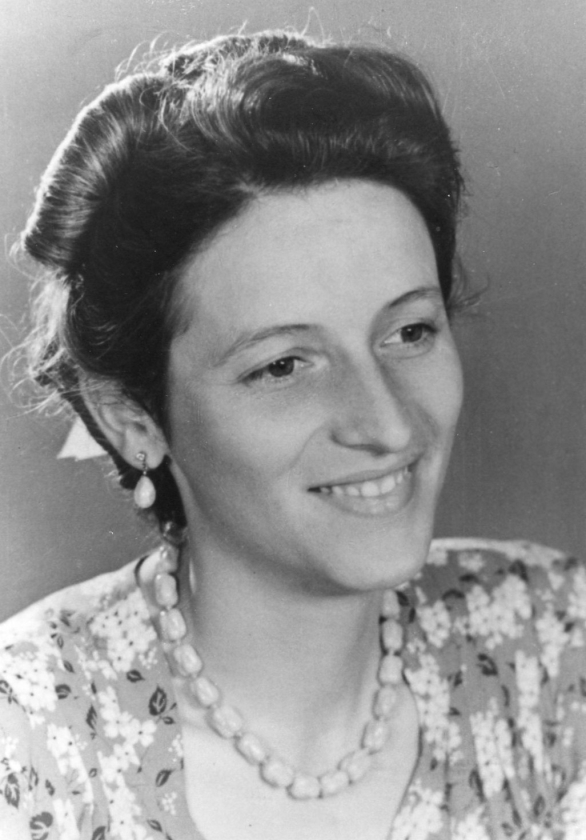
- Born: January 16, 1918; The Hague
- Died: January 31, 2005 (aged 87)
- Occupation: poet
- Known for: best selling poet in the Netherlands

Nelly Anna Benschop (16 January 1918 – 31 January 2005) was a Dutch poet. She was a best selling poet in the Netherlands.

== Early years ==
Benschop was born in The Hague and grew up in a strictly religious Dutch Reformed family. She followed the "Mulo" (advanced elementary education) and after that the "kweekschool" (teacher training college), graduating in 1937. She took recitation lessons from Lily van Haghe. During the Second World War, she also received diplomas for English and French.

After the war, she left her parents' house and became a teacher at a girls' boarding school in Driebergen. After that, she worked as a teacher of Dutch and French at a Mulo in Arnhem and a "lyceum" (grammar school) in Veenendaal. She retired in 1981.

== Poetry ==
Benschop started writing poetry in 1948. In the meantime she recited poems of others, with sometimes a few of her own added. She debuted in 1967 by Kok Publishers in Kampen with the volume Gouddraad uit vlas ("Gold thread from flax"). The publisher almost didn't dare to bring it out, but the volume was an enormous success, and was reprinted sixty times. Of all her volumes of poetry, a total of three million copies were sold. Benschop also wrote aphorisms. Several of her poems are often quoted in death notices, especially In memoriam voor een vriend ("In memoriam for a friend").

Her work is deeply Christian, and because of that has not been taken very seriously by literary critics. Her work is considered more pastoral than literary. She said herself, with some self-mockery: "I write meditations in rhyme". Recurring themes in her work are suffering, death and Christian comfort.

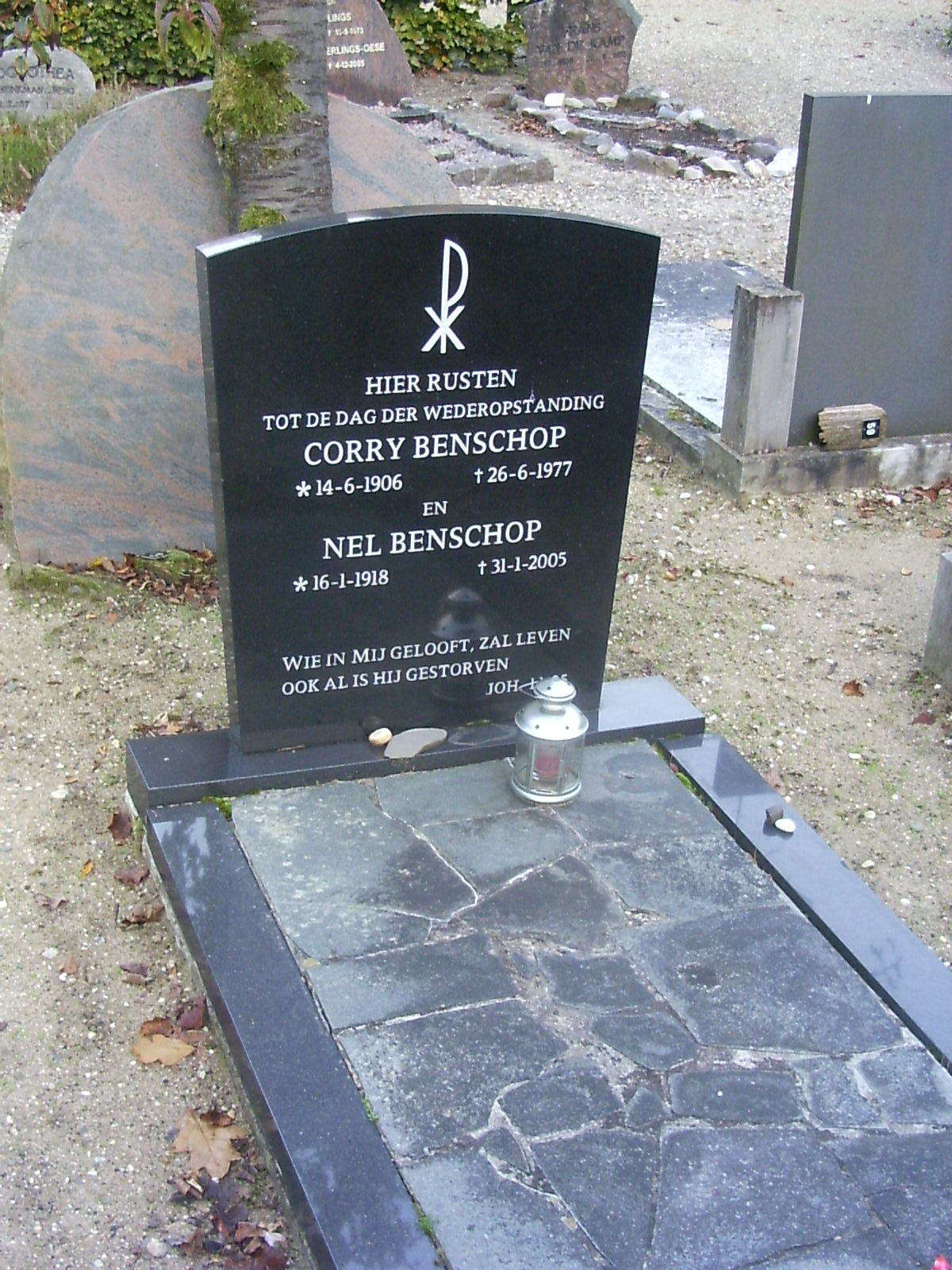

== Death ==
Benschop died, January 31, 2005.

== Bibliography ==
- Gouddraad uit vlas ("Gold thread from flax") (1967)
- Een boom in de wind ("A tree in the wind") (1970)
- Een vlinder van God ("A butterfly of God") (1973)
- Wit als sneeuw ("White as snow") (1974)
- Een open hand naar de hemel ("An open hand to heaven") (1976)
- Mag ik met je mee? ("Can I go with you?") (1976; anthology)
- Geloof je dat nog? ("Do you still believe that?") (1979)
- De vogel van het woord ("The bird of the word") (1980)
- Verborgen bloemen ("Hidden flowers") (1981; aphorisms)
- Verjaardagskalender ("Birthday calendar") (1981)
- Zo zag ik Hem ("That way I saw Him") (1983)
- Hemelhoog en aardediep ("High as heaven and deep as earth") (1985)
- Ontluikend wonder ("Budding miracle") (1986)
- Licht onder de horizon ("Light under the horizon") (1987)
- Hij Die met ons is ("He Who is with us") (1989)
- Geloven is geluk ("Believing is happiness") (1990)
- Sporen in het zand ("Tracks in the sand") (1992)
- Glimlach in woorden ("Smile in words") (1994; spreuken)
- De nacht gaat weer voorbij ("The night will pass") (1995)
- De stem uit de wolk ("The voice from the cloud") (1997)
- Je ogen zijn zo vol licht ("Your eyes are so full of light") (1998)
- Zie de mens ("Behold the man") (1999)
