= SV Die Haghe =

Dutch football club

- Full name: Sportvereniging Die Haghe
- Founded: 1 November 1923
- Ground: Sportpark Ockenburgh, Loosduinen
- Manager: Pieter Jongmans
- League: Eerste Klasse
- Website: http://www.svdiehaghe.nl/
colours

Sportvereniging Die Haghe is a Dutch football club in The Hague, founded 1 November 1923. Its first squad plays in the Eerste Klasse Saturday since 2018. The club plays at Sportpark Ockenburgh in Loosduinen.

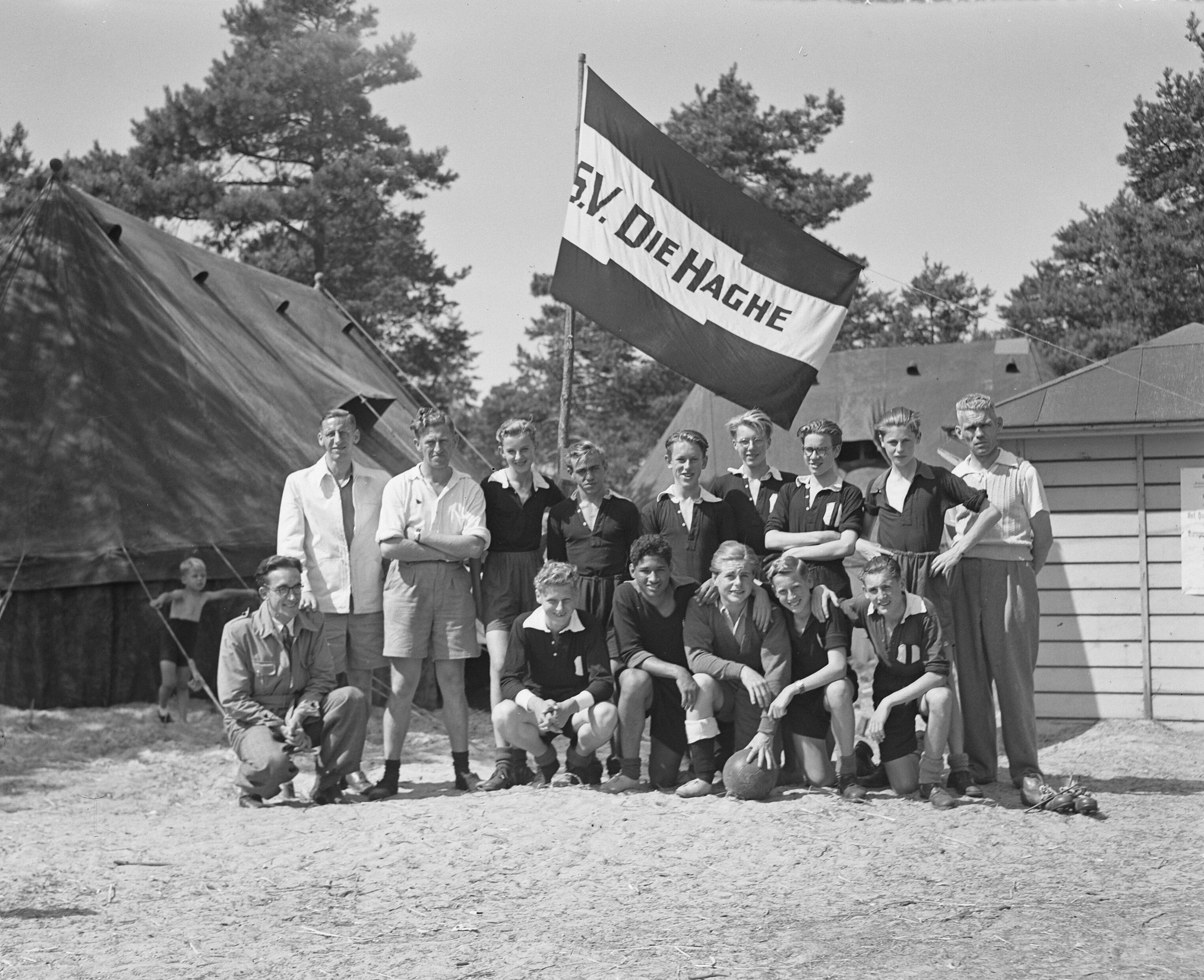
Football camp at SV Die Haghe, August 1949

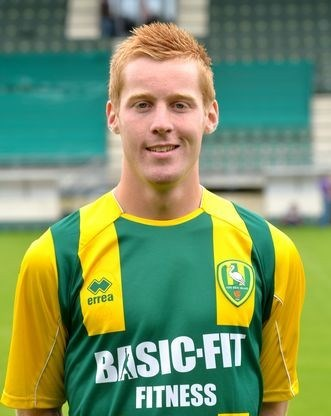
Mike van Duinen played in Die Haghe youth

== History ==
=== 20th century ===
From 1941 until 2001 Die Haghe hovered between the KNVB Vierde and Derde Klasse. It won section championships in the Vierde in 1949, 1959, 1962, 1978, and 1983.

=== 21st century ===
In 2001 Die Haghe promoted for the very first time to the Tweede Klasse through playoffs. From 2001 to 2018 it hovered between the Derde and Tweede Klasse. In 2018 it won its first section championship in the Derde Klasse, beating Quick Steps 3–1 in the decisive game. Die Haghe took its first championship in the Tweede Klasse in the subsequent season, scoring 1–0 against SV DSO in the victory game.

Since 2018, Die Haghe plays in the Eerste Klasse.

== Associated people ==
=== Chief coach ===
- 1987–1990: John Huguenin
- 1990–1994: Wim de Jong
- 1994–1995: Simon van Vliet
- 1995–1998: Wim de Jong
- 1999–2002: René Pas
- 2002–2005: Corné van Doorn
- 2005–2006: Bert de Best
- 2006–2009: Hans Verheij
- 2009–2012: Fred van de Luitgaarden
- 2012–2020: Wim de Jong
- Since 2020: Pieter Jongmans

=== Notable players ===
- Mike van Duinen (youth)
