= Carla Benschop =

Dutch basketball player (1950–2006)

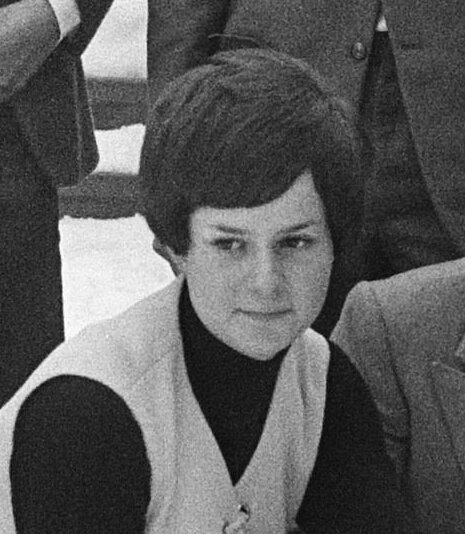
Benschop in 1970

Carla Ida Benschop-de Liefde (20 March 1950 – 22 September 2006) was a Dutch basketball player.

Benschop was one of the Netherlands' most talented female basketball players ever. She played her whole career at Basketball Oud-Beijerland (BOB), which was founded by her mother, Carla de Liefde-Ravelli. While she was with BOB they won the Dutch national championship and reached the semi-finals of the European Cup.

During the '70s she was also part of the European women's basketball team. She had 185 caps for the Dutch national team, which is currently the second position behind leader Anita Blangé (222). She was once crowned European female basketball player of the year.

After her sports career she became a physical education teacher at several secondary schools. In 1990 she married Wim Benschop, also a former basketball player. She left the Rijksscholengemeenschap in Oud-Beijerland where she had worked for 25 years in the summer of 2006, shortly before she was diagnosed with a serious disease. A few weeks later Carla Benschop died, at the age of 56.

== Trivia ==
- Benschop won her 185 caps at a time when women's national basketball teams played international tournaments only once every two years.
