= Ninos Gouriye =

Assyrian-Dutch footballer

Personal information
- Date of birth: 14 January 1991 (age 35)
- Place of birth: Hengelo, Netherlands
- Height: 1.78 m (5 ft 10 in)
- Position: Winger

Team information
- Current team: Neptunus-Schiebroek

Youth career
- HVV Tubantia
- 2002–2011: Twente

Senior career*
Years	Team	Apps	(Gls)
2011–2012	Twente	3	(0)
2012–2013	Heracles	38	(13)
2013–2015	ADO Den Haag	15	(1)
2014–2015	→ Excelsior (loan)	23	(2)
2015	Astra Giurgiu	4	(0)
2016–2017	Cambuur	9	(1)
2017–2019	Vendsyssel	40	(9)
2020–2021	First Vienna	7	(1)
2022–2023	XerxesDZB		
2023–2024	CVV Zwervers		
2024–	Neptunus-Schiebroek		

International career
2008	Netherlands U17	1	(0)
2012	Netherlands U20	5	(1)
- * Club domestic league appearances and goals as of 17 November 2024

Ninos Gouriye (born 14 January 1991) is a Dutch professional footballer who plays as a winger for Rotterdam amateur side Neptunus-Schiebroek.

== Club career ==
He joined ADO Den Haag from Heracles in summer 2013 and was then loaned to Excelsior a year later.

He also formerly played for the Dutch Eerste Divisie club Cambuur as a forward.

== International career ==
Gouriye played 5 games for the Netherlands national under-20 football team and once for the U17s.

== Personal life ==
Gouriye's brothers, Sargon and Teglat, and his cousin Arthur, are also footballers.

== Career statistics ==
As of match played 26 January 2018

Appearances and goals by club, season and competition
Club	Season	League			National Cup		League Cup		Other		Total	
Club	Season	Division	Apps	Goals	Apps	Goals	Apps	Goals	Apps	Goals	Apps	Goals
FC Twente	2011–12	Eredivisie	3	0	0	0	—		2 (Note: Appearances in the Europa League)	0	5	0
Heracles Almelo	2011–12	Eredivisie	12	4	2	1	—		—		14	5
Heracles Almelo	2012–13	Eredivisie	26	9	4	0	—		—		30	9
Heracles Almelo	Total		38	13	6	1	—		0	0	44	14
ADO Den Haag	2013–14	Eredivisie	15	1	2	0	—		—		17	1
Excelsior (loan)	2014–15	Eredivisie	23	2	5	2	—		—		28	4
Astra Giurgiu	2015–16	Liga I	4	0	2	0	1	1	—		7	1
Cambuur	2016–17	Eerste Divisie	9	1	1	0	—		—		10	1
Vendsyssel	2016–17	1. Division	13	3	3	2	—		1 (Note: Appearance in the 1. Division promotion play-offs)	0	17	5
Vendsyssel	2017–18	1. Division	15	5	0	0	—		—		15	5
Vendsyssel	Total		28	8	3	2	—		1	0	32	10
Career total			120	25	19	5	1	1	3	0	143	31

== Honours ==
=== Club ===
Astra Giurgiu

- Liga I: 2015–16
