= Mike van Duinen =

Dutch footballer (born 1991)

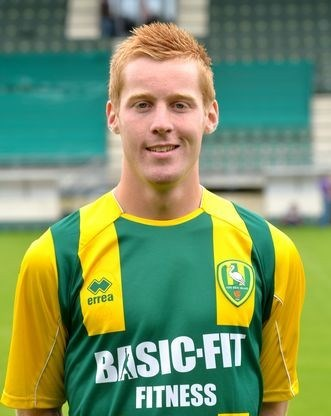
- Van Duinen with ADO Den Haag

Personal information
- Date of birth: 6 November 1991 (age 35)
- Place of birth: The Hague, Netherlands
- Height: 1.85 m (6 ft 1 in)
- Position: Forward

Team information
- Current team: Katwijk
- Number: 9

Youth career
- SV Die Haghe
- OLIVEO

Senior career*
Years	Team	Apps	(Gls)
2011–2015	ADO Den Haag	115	(27)
2015–2016	Fortuna Düsseldorf	12	(1)
2015–2016	Fortuna Düsseldorf II	3	(1)
2016	→ Roda JC (loan)	13	(2)
2016–2018	Excelsior	51	(11)
2018–2021	PEC Zwolle	68	(13)
2021–2022	OFI Crete	21	(0)
2022–2026	Excelsior	94	(6)
2026–	Katwijk	7	(0)
- * Club domestic league appearances and goals as of 19:38, 19 October 2026 (UTC)

Mike van Duinen (Dutch pronunciation: [ˈmɑik fɑn ˈdœynə(n)]; (Note: In isolation, van is pronounced [vɑn].) born 6 November 1991) is a Dutch footballer who plays as a striker for Tweede Divisie club Katwijk.

== Career ==
Born in The Hague, van Duinen moved with his parents to Pijnacker as a child and played for local amateur club OLIVEO. He then started playing professionally for ADO Den Haag and moved abroad to play for 2. Bundesliga outfit Fortuna Düsseldorf in 2015. After an unsuccessful spell, they loaned him to Roda JC for the remainder of the 2015–16 season. He joined Excelsior in the summer of 2016. After two seasons, he signed a three-year deal with Zwolle.

On 10 July 2021, Greek Super League club OFI announced the signing of Mike van Duinen, on a three-year contract.

On 19 August 2022, van Duinen returned to Excelsior and signed a three-year deal. He announced his retirement from professional after the 2025–26 season.

On 22 August 2026, Van Duinen joined Tweede Divisie club Katwijk.

== Career statistics ==
As of match played 4 September 2022

Appearances and goals by club, season and competition
Club	Season	League			Cup		Total	
Club	Season	Division	Apps	Goals	Apps	Goals	Apps	Goals
ADO Den Haag	2010–11	Eredivisie	0	0	0	0	0	0
ADO Den Haag	2011–12	Eredivisie	16	3	1	0	17	3
ADO Den Haag	2012–13	Eredivisie	33	11	2	0	35	11
ADO Den Haag	2013–14	Eredivisie	33	8	2	2	35	10
ADO Den Haag	2014–15	Eredivisie	33	5	1	1	34	6
ADO Den Haag	Total		115	27	6	3	121	30
Fortuna Düsseldorf	2015–16	2. Bundesliga	12	1	2	0	14	1
Roda JC (loan)	2015–16	Eredivisie	13	2	1	0	14	2
Excelsior	2016–17	Eredivisie	22	3	1	0	23	3
Excelsior	2017–18	Eredivisie	29	8	1	1	30	9
Excelsior	Total		51	11	2	1	53	12
Zwolle	2018–19	Eredivisie	33	8	3	1	36	9
Zwolle	2019–20	Eredivisie	12	2	1	0	13	2
Zwolle	2020–21	Eredivisie	23	3	1	0	24	3
Zwolle	Total		68	13	5	1	73	14
OFI	2021–22	Super League Greece	21	0	1	0	22	0
Excelsior	2022–23	Eredivisie	3	0	0	0	3	0
Career total			275	54	17	5	302	59
