= Anthony Biekman =

Dutch professional footballer

Personal information
- Full name: Anthony Biekman
- Date of birth: 16 May 1994 (age 32)
- Place of birth: Zoetermeer, Netherlands
- Height: 1.76 m (5 ft 9 in)
- Position: Forward

Youth career
- Excelsior
- Sparta Rotterdam
- RKC Waalwijk

Senior career*
Years	Team	Apps	(Gls)
2012–2013	Den Bosch	4	(1)
2013–2014	RKC Waalwijk	0	(0)
2014–2015	Dordrecht	10	(1)
2016–2017	Katwijk	9	(0)
2017–2018	Dordrecht	0	(0)
2018–2019	Barendrecht	8	(1)
2020–2021	VCS Den Haag		
2021–2022	FC Skillz		
- * Club domestic league appearances and goals as of 15:35, 24 December 2022 (UTC)

Anthony Biekman (born 16 May 1994) is a Dutch professional footballer who plays as a forward. (Note: Anthony Biekman at WorldFootball.net)

== Club career ==
He formerly played for FC Den Bosch, for whom he scored on his debut in February 2013, RKC Waalwijk and FC Dordrecht. In summer 2015 he left Dordrecht to pursue a career abroad, but he ended up at Tweede Divisie side Katwijk.

In June 2020, Biekman joined VCS from The Hague after having played for BVV Barendrecht the season before.
