= Jordens Peters =

Dutch footballer (born 1987)

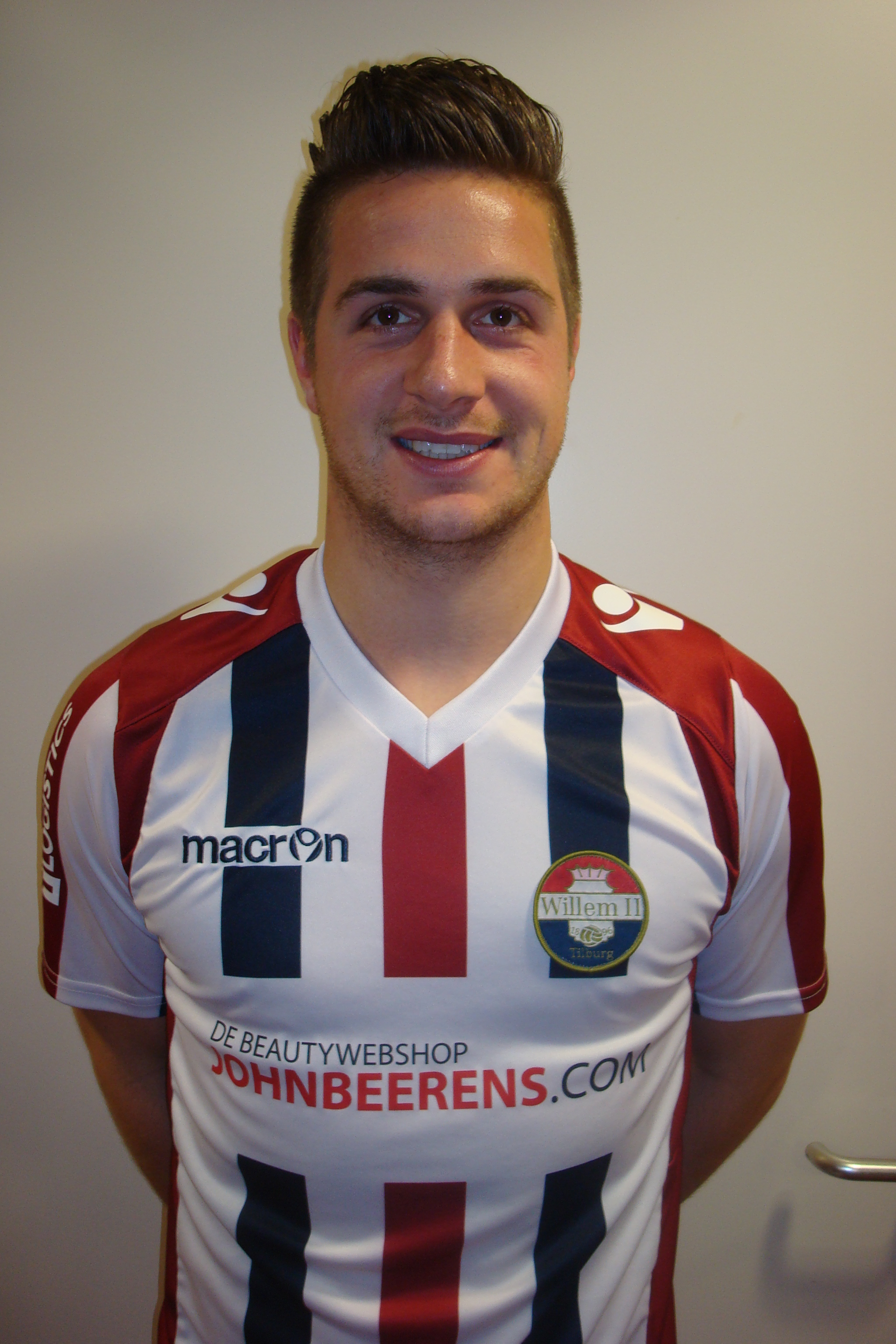
- Peters with Willem II in 2014

Personal information
- Date of birth: 3 May 1987 (age 39)
- Place of birth: Nijmegen, Netherlands
- Height: 1.83 m (6 ft 0 in)
- Position: Centre-back

Youth career
- BMC
- 1997–2005: Den Bosch

Senior career*
Years	Team	Apps	(Gls)
2005–2012	Den Bosch	180	(3)
2012–2021	Willem II	235	(7)
Total		415	(10)

International career
2003–2004	Netherlands U17	6	(0)
2005–2006	Netherlands U19	2	(0)
- * Club domestic league appearances and goals

Jordens Peters (born 3 May 1987) is a Dutch football executive and former professional player who is currently the chief executive of Roda JC Kerkrade. During his playing career he played as a centre-back and represented Willem II and FC Den Bosch.

== Playing career ==
=== Den Bosch ===
Peters played in the youth department of BMC from Berlicum – the town where he grew up – until he was scouted to the youth academy of FC Den Bosch in 1998.

He made his professional debut in the 2004–05 season in the first team, in the Eerste Divisie. He scored his first goal in professional football on 5 September 2008, in a match against Cambuur (0–3). Peters grew into a regular starter in Den Bosch was part of the first team for seven years. The highlight of his tenure at the club was the 2007–08 season, in which he and his teammates finished third and won a period title. Eventually, the team failed to win promotion after being knocked out in the play-offs.

=== Willem II ===
In 2012, Peters signed with Willem II, who had won promotion to the Eredivisie in the previous season. With that club, he finished in last place that season and relegation followed, but by winning the Eerste Divisie title in 2013–14, they returned to the highest level after one season. After that year, Peters himself was also named "Captain of the Season" of the Eerste Divisie. The club then succeeded in the 2014–15 season to retain themselves in the Eredivisie. Ninth place that year was the club's best result in eleven years. In the 2015–16 season, Willem II finished 16th, which meant that they had to compete in the play-offs to retain a place in the Eredivisie. Peters scored one goal in these matches. Partly because of this, they were able to secure a place in the Eredivisie for the following season. In January 2017, Willem II announced that Peters had extended his contract for two years. He suffered a serious knee injury in November 2017, which meant that he was sidelined for a year. On 29 January 2020, Willem II announced that Peters had extended his contract until mid-2021. He reached the final of the 2019–20 KNVB Cup with the club, eventually losing the game to Ajax.

On 19 May 2021, Peters announced his retirement from professional football citing knee injuries as the reason for his decision.

== Post-playing career ==
Peters was announced as the new CEO of Roda JC Kerkrade on 6 October 2021.

== Honours ==
Willem II

- Eerste Divisie: 2013–14
- KNVB Cup runner-up: 2019–20
