= Rogier Benschop =

Dutch footballer (born 1998)

Personal information
- Date of birth: 20 July 1998 (age 28)
- Place of birth: Netherlands
- Height: 1.83 m (6 ft 0 in)
- Position: Left winger

Team information
- Current team: Halsteren

Youth career
- –2012: SCH’44
- 2012–2014: De Meern
- 2014–2015: Utrecht
- 2015–2017: PEC Zwolle

Senior career*
Years	Team	Apps	(Gls)
2017–2019	PEC Zwolle	2	(0)
2019–2020	Almere City	6	(0)
2019–2020	Jong Almere City	25	(5)
2020–2022	Hercules	51	(13)
2023–	Halsteren		
- * Club domestic league appearances and goals as of 02:51, 4 February 2026 (UTC)

Rogier Benschop (born 20 July 1998) is a Dutch professional footballer who plays as a winger for Halsteren.

== Career ==
Benschop grew up in Harmelen and made his professional debut for PEC Zwolle in a 4–0 Eredivisie loss to ADO Den Haag on 22 December 2017.

In 2020, Benschop joined USV Hercules, who he left again in December 2022. He moved to RKSV Halsteren from January 2023.
