= Erik Bakker =

Dutch footballer (born 1990)

Personal information
- Date of birth: 21 March 1990 (age 36)
- Place of birth: Hoogeveen, Netherlands
- Height: 1.78 m (5 ft 10 in)
- Position: Midfielder

Youth career
- –2000: WIJC
- 2000–2007: FC Zwolle

Senior career*
Years	Team	Apps	(Gls)
2007–2011	FC Zwolle	124	(10)
2011–2017	Cambuur	165	(39)
2017–2018	PEC Zwolle	20	(1)
2018–2019	De Graafschap	19	(0)
2019	Honka	1	(0)
2020–2021	Staphorst	13	(2)
Total		342	(52)
- * Club domestic league appearances and goals

Erik Bakker (born 21 March 1990) is a Dutch former professional footballer who played as a midfielder.

== Career ==
=== Zwolle ===
Bakker was born in Hoogeveen, Drenthe, Netherlands, and grew up in nearby Koekange. He started his football career in the youth department of local amateur club WIJC, before joining FC Zwolle's youth academy in 2000.

On 10 August 2007, he made his professional debut for their first team, replacing Anton Jongsma in the 82nd minute of a 1–1 away draw against Haarlem in the Eerste Divisie. On 7 September 2007, he scored his first professional goal in a 4–1 home win over Den Bosch. Bakker then signed a two-year contract extension with an option for an additional year on 26 September 2007. In February 2009, Zwolle extended his contract again, keeping him a Blauwvinger until 2012.

Bakker would play for Zwolle until 2011, making 138 total appearances for the club, in which he scored 11 goals.

=== Cambuur ===
In June 2011, Bakker signed a two-year contract with Cambuur. On the opening day of the season on 8 August, he debuted for the club, starting and scoring his first goal from a penalty in the 77th minute during a 4–2 away victory against AGOVV. He established himself as a key figure in the first team at the club, playing a pivotal role in Cambuur's clinching of the 2012–13 Eerste Divisie title, which consequently earned them promotion to the Eredivisie. He scored in the final game of the season; a 2–0 away win over Excelsior, which secured the first-place finish. At that point, he had developed into a prolific goalscorer while playing in midfield for Cambuur. He netted 11 goals in 19 league appearances during his first season at the club, followed by 10 goals in 29 league games during the promotion season.

Bakker debuted in the Eredivisie on the opening day of the 2013–14 season. He played the full home game against NAC Breda in a 0–0 draw, starting as a defensive midfielder. On 17 August 2013, he scored his first top-level goal, contributing to his team's 2–0 lead in a 4–1 home victory against Groningen. It was their first Eredivisie win since May 2000.

In October 2014, Bakker signed a contract extension, keeping him at Cambuur until 2017. At the conclusion of the 2015–16 season, Cambuur faced relegation back to the Eerste Divisie after three consecutive seasons in the Eredivisie. Bakker had made 80 appearances at the top level, scoring eight goals. He played one more season with Cambuur in the Eerste Divisie before departing from the club. During his six seasons in Leeuwarden, Bakker made a total of 184 appearances, including league and KNVB Cup matches, and scored 40 goals.

=== Return to Zwolle ===
On 24 May 2017, it was announced that Bakker would rejoin PEC Zwolle ahead of the 2017–18 season, formerly known as FC Zwolle. There, he was set to replace Danny Holla, who had left for Twente.

=== Later career ===
On 27 December 2019, Bakker joined VV Staphorst after a short one-month spell at Finland with FC Honka from August to September.

== Honours ==
Cambuur

- Eerste Divisie: 2012–13
