= 2016–17 PEC Zwolle season =

PEC Zwolle
2016–17 season
- Chairman: Adriaan Visser
- Manager: Ron Jans
- Stadium: MAC³PARK stadion
- Top goalscorer: League: (Netherlands) Queensy Menig (9); All: (Denmark) Nicolai Brock-Madsen (10)
- Highest home attendance: 13,250 vs Feyenoord (9 April 2017); 13,250 vs Heracles Almelo (22 April 2017); 13,250 vs SC Heerenveen (7 May 2017)
Home colours	Away colours	Third colours

The 2016–17 season was PEC Zwolle's 106th season of play, it marked its 15th season in the Eredivisie and its fifth consecutive season in the top flight of Dutch football.

== Competitions ==
=== Friendlies ===
2 July 2016 Friendly	Regional selection	0 – 10	PEC Zwolle	Nieuwleusen
		Report	7', 15' Youness Mokhtar; 18' (pen.) Bram van Polen; 20' Dirk Marcellis; 25' Wout Brama; 30' Wouter Marinus; 40' Josef Kvída; 45' Queensy Menig; 61' Anass Achahbar; 83' Tarik Evre	Stadium: Sportpark Het Klaverblad

5 July 2016 Friendly	SC Genemuiden	0 – 1	PEC Zwolle	Genemuiden
		Report	73' Kingsley Ehizibue	Stadium: Sportpark De Wetering

8 July 2016 Friendly	VVV-Venlo	2 – 1	PEC Zwolle	Hasselt
	Nils Röseler 45'; Tim Receveur 73'	Report	18' Anass Achahbar	Stadium: Sportpark 't Hoenbroek

15 July 2016 Friendly	K.A.A. Gent (Belgium)	0 – 3	PEC Zwolle	Hattem
		Report	42', 50' Kingsley Ehizibue; 54' Thanasis Karagounis	Stadium: Sportpark 't Achterveen

20 July 2016 Friendly	Panathinaikos F.C. (Greece)	4 – 0	PEC Zwolle	Athens
	Cristian Ledesma 27'; Robin Lod 37'; Mubarak Wakaso 40'; Marcus Berg 66'	Report		Stadium: Leoforos Alexandras Stadium; Attendance: 5.000

23 July 2016 Friendly	Southampton F.C. (England)	4 – 0	PEC Zwolle	Nieuwleusen
	Charlie Austin 14'; Nathan Redmond 42', 43'; Pierre-Emile Højbjerg 89' (pen.)	Report		Stadium: Sportpark Hulsterlanden; Referee: Siemen Mulder

30 July 2016 Friendly	PEC Zwolle	1 – 0	(Turkey) Gençlerbirliği S.K.	Zwolle
	Anass Achahbar 56'	Report		Stadium: MAC³PARK stadion Referee: Jeroen Manschot

1 September 2016 Friendly	PEC Zwolle	2 – 0	FC Volendam	Zwolle
	18' Anass Achahbar; 89' Jochem van Putten	Report		Stadium: MAC³PARK stadion Referee: Jeroen Manschot

6 October 2016 Friendly	PEC Zwolle	1 – 2	SC Cambuur	Zwolle
	Hachim Mastour 72'	Report	64' Martijn Barto; 74' Jergé Hoefdraad	Stadium: MAC³PARK stadion Referee: Martin van den Kerkhof

7 January 2017 Friendly	PEC Zwolle	2 – 1	N.E.C.	(Spain) Marbella
	Mustafa Saymak 36'; Queensy Menig 70'	Report	47' (pen.) Gregor Breinburg	Stadium: Marbella Football Center

23 March 2017 Friendly	AFC Ajax	1 – 1	PEC Zwolle	Amsterdam
	Pelle Clement 34'	Report	78' Dirk Marcellis	Stadium: Sportpark De Toekomst

20 May 2017 Friendly	SV Hatto Heim	1 – 9	PEC Zwolle	Hattem
	Niels van der Velde 25'	Report	7', 20', 83' Kingsley EHizibue; 25' Ouasim Bouy; 30' Stefan Nijland; 52' Anass Achahbar; 55' Erik Israelsson; 59' Queensy Menig; 71' Wouter Marinus	Stadium: Sportpark 't Achterveen

=== Eredivisie ===
==== League table ====
Pos	Team	Pld	W	D	L	GF	GA	GD	Pts	Qualification or relegation
12	Excelsior	34	9	10	15	43	60	−17	37	
13	Willem II	34	9	9	16	29	44	−15	36	
14	PEC Zwolle	34	9	8	17	39	67	−28	35	
15	Sparta Rotterdam	34	9	7	18	42	61	−19	34	
16	NEC (R)	34	9	7	18	32	59	−27	34	Qualification for the Relegation play-offs

Source: NUsport (in Dutch), Soccerway
Rules for classification: 1) Points; 2) Goal difference; 3) Goals scored; 4) Play-off (only for deciding champion and relegation); 5) Head-to-head points; 6) Head-to-head goal difference; 7) Head-to-head away goals scored; 8) Draw. (Note: Criteria 5-8 is only used if deciding Europa League play-off places)
(R) Relegated

==== Results summary ====
Overall								Home						Away					
Pld	W	D	L	GF	GA	GD	Pts	W	D	L	GF	GA	GD	W	D	L	GF	GA	GD
34	9	8	17	39	67	−28	35	5	5	7	19	28	−9	4	3	10	20	39	−19

Source: League matches

5 August 2016 1	N.E.C.	1 – 1	PEC Zwolle	Nijmegen
	Reagy Ofosu 63'	Report	32' Queensy Menig	Stadium: Stadion de Goffert; Attendance: 10,900; Referee: Serdar Gözübüyük

13 August 2016 2	PEC Zwolle	0 – 3	Sparta Rotterdam	Zwolle
		Report	40', 87' Loris Brogno; 58' Craig Goodwin	Stadium: MAC³PARK stadion Attendance: 12,800; Referee: Jochem Kamphuis

20 August 2016 3	PEC Zwolle	0 – 4	PSV	Zwolle
		Report	22' Nicolas Isimat-Mirin; 35' Jorrit Hendrix; 86' Luuk de Jong; 89' Steven Bergwijn	Stadium: MAC³PARK stadion Attendance: 12,000; Referee: Pol van Boekel

27 August 2016 4	SC Heerenveen	1 – 0	PEC Zwolle	Heerenveen
	Sam Larsson 50'	Report		Stadium: Abe Lenstra Stadion; Attendance: 20,080; Referee: Allard Lieshout

10 September 2016 5	PEC Zwolle	1 – 1	FC Utrecht	Zwolle
	Kingsley Ehizibue 12'	Report	90+1' (pen.) Sébastien Haller	Stadium: MAC³PARK stadion Attendance: 12,600; Referee: Siemen Mulder

18 September 2016 6	PEC Zwolle	0 – 2	AZ	Zwolle
		Report	43' Wout Weghorst; 87' Guus Til	Stadium: MAC³PARK stadion Attendance: 12,900; Referee: Danny Makkelie

24 September 2016 7	AFC Ajax	5 – 1	PEC Zwolle	Amsterdam
	Davinson Sánchez 8', 38'; Kasper Dolberg 55', 64'; Bertrand Traoré 59'	Report	4' Wout Brama	Stadium: Amsterdam Arena; Referee: Jochem Kamphuis

30 September 2016 8	PEC Zwolle	2 – 1	ADO Den Haag	Zwolle
	Youness Mokhtar 51', 70'	Report	47' Tom Trybull	Stadium: MAC³PARK stadion Attendance: 12,400; Referee: Björn Kuipers

16 October 2016 9	FC Twente	2 – 2	PEC Zwolle	Enschede
	Mateusz Klich 10' (pen.); Enes Ünal 77'	Report	Youness Mokhtar 40'; Django Warmerdam 83'	Stadium: De Grolsch Veste; Attendance: 24,900; Referee: Dennis Higler

21 October 2016 10	Excelsior	0 – 2	PEC Zwolle	Rotterdam
		Report	48' Queensy Menig; 88' Django Warmerdam	Stadium: Stadion Woudestein; Attendance: 3,640; Referee: Allard Lindhout

30 October 2016 11	PEC Zwolle	3 – 1	Go Ahead Eagles	Zwolle
	Queensy Menig 2'; Mustafa Saymak 57'; Danny Holla 89'	Report	42' Sander Fischer	Stadium: MAC³PARK stadion Attendance: 13,200; Referee: Serdar Gözübüyük

5 November 2016 12	PEC Zwolle	0 – 0	Roda JC Kerkrade	Zwolle
		Report		Stadium: MAC³PARK stadion Attendance: 12,600; Referee: Björn Kuipers

20 November 2016 13	Feyenoord	3 – 0	PEC Zwolle	Rotterdam
	Dirk Kuyt 38'; Karim El Ahmadi 71'; Jens Toornstra 76'	Report		Stadium: De Kuip; Attendance: 47,500; Referee: Dennis Higler

26 November 2016 14	PEC Zwolle	0 – 4	FC Groningen	Zwolle
		Report	1' Simon Tibbling; 39' Tom van Weert; 77' Albert Rusnák; 86' Mimoun Mahi	Stadium: MAC³PARK stadion Attendance: 13,000; Referee: Pol van Boekel

4 December 2016 15	Vitesse	3 – 1	PEC Zwolle	Arnhem
	Lewis Baker 32' (pen.); Zhang Yuning 41'; Nathan 90+2'	Report	67' Bart Schenkeveld	Stadium: GelreDome; Attendance: 14,173; Referee: Jochem Kamphuis

10 December 2016 16	PEC Zwolle	0 – 0	Willem II	Zwolle
		Report		Stadium: MAC³PARK stadion Attendance: 12,200; Referee: Kevin Blom

17 December 2016 17	Heracles Almelo	3 – 0	PEC Zwolle	Almelo
	Samuel Armenteros 17' (pen.); Vincent Vermeij 78'; Daryl van Mieghem 80'	Report		Stadium: Polman Stadion; Attendance: 11,102; Referee: Edwin van de Graaf

15 January 2017 18	PEC Zwolle	1 – 3	AFC Ajax	Zwolle
	Nicolai Brock-Madsen 72'	Report	54' (pen.) Lasse Schöne; 55', 80' Hakim Ziyech	Stadium: MAC³PARK stadion Attendance: 13,250; Referee: Dennis Higler

21 January 2017 19	ADO Den Haag	1 – 2	PEC Zwolle	The Hague
	Gervane Kastaneer 10'	Report	38' Kingsley Ehizibue; 56' Nicolai Brock-Madsen	Stadium: Kyocera Stadion; Attendance: 9,130; Referee: Christiaan Bax

29 January 2017 20	PEC Zwolle	1 – 2	FC Twente	Zwolle
	Queensy Menig 31'	Report	8' Dylan Seys; 55' Oussama Assaidi	Stadium: MAC³PARK stadion Attendance: 12,800; Referee: Martin van den Kerkhof

5 February 2017 21	Sparta Rotterdam	2 – 3	PEC Zwolle	Rotterdam
	Mathias Pogba 90+1', 90+3'	Report	51' Queensy Menig; 62' Nicolai Brock-Madsen; 86' Erik Israelsson	Stadium: Het Kasteel; Attendance: 10,131; Referee: Bas Nijhuis

10 February 2017 22	PEC Zwolle	2 – 0	N.E.C.	Zwolle
	Nicolai Brock-Madsen 57'; Queensy Menig 71'	Report		Stadium: MAC³PARK stadion Attendance: 13,200; Referee: Jeroen Manschot

18 February 2017 23	FC Utrecht	3 – 1	PEC Zwolle	Utrecht
	Bram van Polen 44'; Gyrano Kerk 49'; Nacer Barazite 80'	Report	Nicolai Brock-Madsen 86'	Stadium: Stadion Galgenwaard; Attendance: 18,349; Referee: Ed Janssen

25 February 2017 24	AZ	1 – 1	PEC Zwolle	Alkmaar
	Fred Friday 81'	Report	48' Ryan Thomas	Stadium: AFAS Stadion; Attendance: 14,787; Referee: Pol van Boekel

4 March 2017 25	PEC Zwolle	3 – 1	Vitesse	Zwolle
	Mustafa Syamak 10'; Nicolai Brock-Madsen 18'; Danny Holla 55'	Report	48' Ricky van Wolfswinkel	Stadium: MAC³PARK stadion Attendance: 13,000; Referee: Allard Lindhout

12 March 2017 26	Willem II	2 – 0	PEC Zwolle	Tilburg
	Erik Falkenburg 24'; Thom Haye 90+1'	Report		Stadium: Koning Willem II Stadion; Attendance: 13,500; Referee: Björn Kuipers

19 March 2017 27	Go Ahead Eagles	1 – 3	PEC Zwolle	Deventer
	Pedro Chirivella 3'	Report	5' Queensy Menig; 83' Django Warmerdam; 88' (pen.) Bram van Polen	Stadium: De Adelaarshorst; Attendance: 9,782; Referee: Danny Makkelie

1 April 2017 28	PEC Zwolle	1 – 1	Excelsior	Zwolle
	Django Warmerdam 26'	Report	34' Luigi Bruins	Stadium: MAC³PARK stadion Attendance: 13,140; Referee: Jochem Kamphuis

6 April 2017 29	Roda JC Kerkrade	2 – 1	PEC Zwolle	Kerkrade
	Gyliano van Velzen 48'; Mikhail Rosheuvel 89'	Report	40' Youness Mokhtar	Stadium: Parkstad Limburg Stadion; Attendance: 12,074; Referee: Ed Janssen

9 April 2017 30	PEC Zwolle	2 – 2	Feyenoord	Zwolle
	Queensy Menig 3'; Bram van Polen 13'	Report	26', 54' Steven Berghuis	Stadium: MAC³PARK stadion Attendance: 13,250; Referee: Kevin Blom

16 April 2017 31	FC Groningen	5 – 1	PEC Zwolle	Groningen
	Bryan Linssen 14', 38'; Mimoun Mahi 19', 53'; Ajdin Hrustić 88'	Report	46' Nicolai Brock-Madsen	Stadium: Euroborg; Attendance: 21,666; Referee: Martin van den Kerkhof

22 April 2017 32	PEC Zwolle	1 – 2	Heracles Almelo	Zwolle
	Ted van de Pavert 86'	Report	55', 80' Samuel Armenteros	Stadium: MAC³PARK stadion Attendance: 13,250; Referee: Danny Makkelie

7 May 2017 33	PEC Zwolle	2 – 1	SC Heerenveen	Zwolle
	Queensy Menig 29'; Danny Holla 47'	Report	90+5' Reza Ghoochannejhad	Stadium: MAC³PARK stadion Attendance: 13,250; Referee: Bas Nijhuis

14 May 2017 34	PSV	4 – 1	PEC Zwolle	Eindhoven
	Héctor Moreno 78'; Santiago Arias 80'; Sam Lammers 85'; Bart Ramselaar 88'	Report	29' Ted van de Pavert	Stadium: Philips Stadion; Attendance: 33,800; Referee: Jeroen Manschot

=== KNVB Cup ===
21 September 2016 First round	DVS '33	1 – 4	PEC Zwolle	Ermelo
	Kay Velda 89'	Report	8', 57' Nicolai Brock-Madsen; 23' (pen.) Bram van Polen; 39' Anass Achahbar	Stadium: Sportlaan; Attendance: 2,800; Referee: Allard Lindhout

27 October 2016 Second round	PEC Zwolle	2 – 1	VVV-Venlo	Zwolle
	Kingsley Ehizibue 29'; Youness Mokhtar 52'	Report	83' Joey Sleegers	Stadium: MAC³PARK stadion Attendance: 12,725; Referee: Jochem Kamphuis

14 December 2016 Third round	PEC Zwolle	1 – 2	FC Utrecht	Zwolle
	Nicolai Brock-Madsen 8'	Report	81' Kevin Conboy; 90+2' Richairo Zivkovic	Stadium: MAC³PARK stadion Attendance: 7,600; Referee: Björn Kuipers

== Statistics ==
=== Squad details and appearances ===
Nr.	Nat.	Name	Eredivisie		KNVB Cup		Total		Contract end	Season	Signed from	Debut
Nr.	Nat.	Name	G	Goal	G	Goal	G	Goal	Contract end	Season	Signed from	Debut
Goalkeepers
1	(Netherlands)	Mickey van der Hart	34	0	3	0	37	0	2018	2nd	(Netherlands) AFC Ajax	24 September 2015
16	(Belgium)	Kevin Begois	0	0	0	0	0	0	2017	4th	(Netherlands) FC Den Bosch	4 August 2013
25	(Netherlands)	Dean Bredewolt	0	0	0	0	0	0	Youth	1st	Academy	—
40	(Netherlands)	Mike Hauptmeijer	0	0	0	0	0	0	2018	1st	Academy	—
Defenders
2	(Netherlands)	Bram van Polen	31	2	3	1	34	3	2018	11th	(Netherlands) SBV Vitesse	12 October 2007
3	(Netherlands)	Ted van de Pavert	23	2	3	0	26	2	2019	1st	(Netherlands) De Graafschap	5 August 2016
4	(Netherlands)	Dirk Marcellis	29	0	2	0	31	0	2017	2nd	(Netherlands) NAC Breda	12 August 2015
5	(Netherlands)	Calvin Verdonk	15	0	2	0	17	0	On loan	1st	(Netherlands) Feyenoord	5 August 2016
13	(Netherlands)	Philippe Sandler	7	0	0	0	7	0	2019	1st	(Netherlands) AFC Ajax (Academy)	13 August 2016
15	(Netherlands)	Ouasim Bouy	13	0	0	0	13	0	On loan	2nd	(Italy) Juventus FC	12 September 2015
17	(Czech Republic)	Josef Kvída	2	0	0	0	2	0	2017	2nd	(Czech Republic) 1. FK Příbram	4 December 2016
21	(Netherlands)	Django Warmerdam	26	4	3	0	29	4	On loan	1st	(Netherlands) AFC Ajax	21 September 2016
22	(Netherlands)	Bart Schenkeveld	20	1	2	0	22	1	2018	2nd	(Netherlands) Heracles Almelo	12 August 2015
48	(Netherlands)	Tarik Evre	0	0	0	0	0	0	Youth	2nd	Academy	27 February 2015
Midfielders
6	(Netherlands)	Mustafa Saymak	26	2	3	0	29	2	2018	6th	Academy	5 August 2011
8	(Netherlands)	Wouter Marinus	11	0	2	0	13	0	2019	3rd	(Netherlands) sc Heerenveen (Academy)	12 August 2015
14	(Netherlands)	Wout Brama	14	0	3	0	17	0	2017	3rd	(Netherlands) FC Twente	19 October 2014
14	(Sweden)	Erik Israelsson	5	1	0	0	5	1	2019	1st	(Sweden) Hammarby IF	5 February 2017
18	(Brazil)	Gustavo Hebling	3	0	0	0	3	0	On loan	2nd	(France) Paris Saint-Germain F.C.	21 November 2015
19	(Netherlands)	Rick Dekker	0	0	0	0	0	0	2018	3rd	(Netherlands) Feyenoord (Academy)	5 October 2014
23	(Netherlands)	Danny Holla	25	3	3	0	28	3	2017	2nd	(England) Brighton & Hove Albion F.C.	10 August 2007
29	(Netherlands)	Sander van Looy	0	0	0	0	0	0	Youth	2nd	Academy	—
98	(Morocco)	Hachim Mastour	5	0	1	0	6	0	On loan	1st	(Italy) A.C. Milan	13 August 2016
Forwards
7	(Netherlands)	Youness Mokhtar	23	4	1	1	24	5	2018	4th	(Saudi Arabia) Al-Nassr	25 August 2012
9	(Netherlands)	Anass Achahbar	19	0	1	1	20	1	2020	1st	(Netherlands) Feyenoord	5 August 2016
10	(Netherlands)	Stefan Nijland	12	0	0	0	12	0	2018	4th	(Netherlands) PSV	10 August 2013
11	(Netherlands)	Queensy Menig	32	9	2	0	34	9	On loan	2nd	(Netherlands) AFC Ajax	12 August 2015
20	(Netherlands)	Kingsley Ehizibue	29	2	2	1	31	3	2017	3rd	Academy	13 December 2014
30	(New Zealand)	Ryan Thomas	31	1	2	0	33	1	2019	4th	(New Zealand) Western Suburbs FC	2 November 2013
33	(Greece)	Thanasis Karagounis	5	0	2	0	7	0	2018	4th	(Greece) Atromitos	18 January 2014
35	(France)	Hervin Ongenda	3	0	0	0	3	0	2020	1st	(France) Paris Saint-Germain F.C.	5 February 2017
44	(Denmark)	Nicolai Brock-Madsen	24	7	2	3	26	10	On loan	1st	(England) Birmingham City FC	10 September 2016
48	(Netherlands)	Max de Boom	1	0	0	0	1	0	2017	3rd	(Netherlands) sc Heerenveen (Academy)	13 December 2014
No.	Nat.	Name	G	Goal	G	Goal	G	Goal	Contract end	Season	Signed from	Debut
No.	Nat.	Name	Eredivisie		KNVB Cup		Total		Contract end	Season	Signed from	Debut

=== Goalscorers ===
Rank	Player	Position	Eredivisie	KNVB Cup	Total
1	(Denmark) Nicolai Brock-Madsen	FW	7	3	10
2	(Netherlands) Queensy Menig	FW	9	0	9
3	(Netherlands) Youness Mokhtar	FW	5	0	5
4	(Netherlands) Django Warmerdam	LB	4	0	4
5	(Netherlands) Danny Holla	CM	3	0	3
6	(Netherlands) Kingsley Ehizibue	FW	2	1	3
7	(Netherlands) Bram van Polen	RB	2	1	2
8	(Netherlands) Mustafa Saymak	CM	2	0	2
9	(Netherlands) Wout Brama	CM	1	0	1
10	(Sweden) Erik Israelsson	AM	1	0	1
11	(Netherlands) Ted van de Pavert	CB	1	0	1
12	(Netherlands) Bart Schenkeveld	RB	1	0	1
13	(New Zealand) Ryan Thomas	FW	1	0	1
14	(Netherlands) Anass Achahbar	FW	0	1	1
Total			38	7	45

== Transfers ==
=== In ===
#	Nat.	Name	From	Type	Date	Fee
Summer
9	(Netherlands)	Anass Achahbar	(Netherlands) Feyenoord	Transfer	30 June 2020	± €300,000
44	(Denmark)	Nicolai Brock-Madsen	(England) Birmingham City F.C.	On loan	30 juni 2017	–
40	(Netherlands)	Mike Hauptmeijer	(Netherlands) Youth Academy	–	30 June 2018	–
23	(Netherlands)	Danny Holla	(England) Brighton & Hove Albion F.C.	Free	30 June 2017	–
98	(Morocco)	Hachim Mastour	(Italy) A.C. Milan	On loan	30 June 2017	–
11	(Netherlands)	Queensy Menig	(Netherlands) AFC Ajax	On loan	30 June 2017	–
3	(Netherlands)	Ted van de Pavert	(Netherlands) De Graafschap	Free	30 June 2019	–
13	(Netherlands)	Philippe Sandler	(Netherlands) AFC Ajax (Academy)	Free	30 June 2019	–
5	(Netherlands)	Calvin Verdonk	(Netherlands) Feyenoord	On loan	30 June 2017	–
21	(Netherlands)	Django Warmerdam	(Netherlands) AFC Ajax	On loan	30 June 2017	–
Winter
15	(Netherlands)	Ouasim Bouy	(Italy) Juventus FC	On loan	30 June 2017	–
14	(Sweden)	Erik Israelsson	(Sweden) Hammarby IF	Transfer	30 June 2019	Unknown
35	(France)	Hervin Ongenda	(France) Paris Saint-Germain F.C.	Free	30 June 2020	–

=== Out ===
#	Nat.	Name	To	Type	Fee	G	Goal
Summer
7	(Netherlands)	Sheraldo Becker	(Netherlands) AFC Ajax	End of loan	–	38	5
8	(Netherlands)	Ouasim Bouy	(Italy) Juventus FC	End of loan	–	28	4
15	(Netherlands)	Samet Bulut	Unknown	End of contract	–	1	0
21	(Netherlands)	Abdel Malek El Hasnaoui	Unknown	End of contract	–	16	0
5	(Netherlands)	Bart van Hintum	(Turkey) Gaziantepspor	End of contract	–	153	11
25	(Netherlands)	Boy de Jong	(Netherlands) SC Telstar	End of contract	–	2	0
28	(Finland)	Thomas Lam	(England) Nottingham Forest F.C.	End of contract	–	67	8
24	(Bosnia and Herzegovina)	Boban Lazić	(Netherlands) FC Oss	End of contract	–	5	0
11	(Netherlands)	Queensy Menig	(Netherlands) AFC Ajax	End of loan	–	36	6
26	(Bosnia and Herzegovina)	Boris Rasevic	(Netherlands) HHC Hardenberg	End of contract	–	3	0
23	(Netherlands)	Dario Tanda	(Netherlands) Go Ahead Eagles	End of contract	–	3	0
42	(Netherlands)	Sander Thomas	(Netherlands) Heracles Almelo	End of contract	–	3	0
9	(Netherlands)	Lars Veldwijk	(England) Nottingham Forest F.C.	End of loan	–	36	14
Winter
38	(Netherlands)	Max de Boom	(Netherlands) Helmond Sport	Free	–	2	0
14	(Netherlands)	Wout Brama	(Netherlands) FC Utrecht	Free	–	70	4
