= 2015–16 PEC Zwolle season =

PEC Zwolle
2015–16 season
- Chairman: Adriaan Visser
- Manager: Ron Jans
- Stadium: IJsseldelta Stadion
- Eredivisie: 8th
- KNVB Cup: Second round
- Europa League Play-offs: First round
- Top goalscorer: League: (Netherlands) Lars Veldwijk (14); All: (Netherlands) Lars Veldwijk (14)
- Highest home attendance: 51,862 vs Ajax (3 April 2016)
- Lowest home attendance: 3,750 at SBV Excelsior (1 May 2016)
Home colours	Away colours

The 2015–16 season was PEC Zwolle's 105th season of play, it marked its 16th season in the Eredivisie and its 4th consecutive season in the top flight of Dutch football. They ended the season eight in the league. PEC Zwolle entered the KNVB Cup in the second round. They started their campaign by losing to Feyenoord.

== Competitions ==
=== Friendlies ===
30 June 2015	SV Hatto Heim	0–9	PEC Zwolle	Hattem
		Report	3', 28' Stefan Nijland; 6', 38' Jesper Drost; 16' Wouter Marinus; 58' (pen.) Lars Veldwijk; 61' Ben Rienstra; 73' Mustafa Saymak; 81' Sheraldo Becker	Stadium: Sportpark 't Achterveen

7 July 2015	SC Genemuiden	1–4	PEC Zwolle	Genemuiden
	Erik Rotman 45+1' (pen.)	Report	4' Mustafa Saymak; 21' Lars Veldwijk; 40' Sheraldo Becker; 60' Emmanuel Mbende	Stadium: Sportpark de Wetering

11 July 2015	PEC Zwolle	2–2	(Ukraine) FC Dnipro Dnipropetrovsk	Hasselt
	Jesper Drost 9'; Lars Veldwijk 49' (pen.)	Report	45' (pen.) Nikola Kalinić; 62' (pen.) Yevhen Seleznyov	Stadium: Sportpark 't Hoenbroeck

17 July 2015	PEC Zwolle	3–1	Sparta Rotterdam	Hattem
	Jesper Drost 30'; Lars Veldwijk 57', 59'	Report	75' Huseyin Dogan	Stadium: Sportpark 't Achterveen

21 July 2015	PEC Zwolle	5–1	(Turkey) Mersin İdmanyurdu	Hattem
	Lars Veldwijk 12'; Jesper Drost 29'; Sheraldo Becker 45'; Ben Rienstra 65'; Kudbettin Tekin Oğrak 72' (o.g.)		62' Préjuce Nakoulma	Stadium: Sportpark 't Achterveen

25 July 2015	PEC Zwolle	1–3	(Spain) Levante UD	Hasselt
	Bram van Polen 90+1' (pen.)	Report	38', 49' Nabil Ghilas; 70' Roger Martí	Stadium: Sportpark 't Hoenbroeck

1 August 2015	VVV-Venlo	1–2	PEC Zwolle	Venlo
	Ralf Seuntjens 60' (pen.)	Report	23' Sheraldo Becker; 54' Lars Veldwijk	Stadium: De Koel

3 September 2015	PEC Zwolle	2–2	SC Cambuur	Zwolle
	Stefan Nijland 2'; Kingsley Ehizibue 18'		27' Martijn Barto; 71' Valmir Berisha	Stadium: IJsseldelta Stadion

8 October 2015	PEC Zwolle	1–0	FC Emmen	Zwolle
	Stefan Nijland 23'			Stadium: IJsseldelta Stadion

8 January 2016	PEC Zwolle	1–3	N.E.C.	San Pedro de Alcántara
	Bram van Polen 49' (pen.)	Report	20' Christian Santos; 32' Anthony Limbombe; 45' Gregor Breinburg

=== Eredivisie ===
==== League table ====
Pos	Team	Pld	W	D	L	GF	GA	GD	Pts	Qualification or relegation
6	Heracles Almelo (O)	34	14	9	11	47	49	−2	51	Qualification for the European competition play-offs (Note: Four teams played for one spot in the UEFA Europa League third qualifying round.)
7	Groningen	34	14	8	12	41	48	−7	50	Qualification for the European competition play-offs
8	PEC Zwolle	34	14	6	14	56	54	+2	48	Qualification for the European competition play-offs
9	Vitesse	34	12	10	12	55	38	+17	46	
10	NEC	34	13	7	14	37	42	−5	46	

Source: Eredivisie, NUsport, Soccerway
Rules for classification: 1) Points; 2) Goal difference; 3) Goals scored; 4) Head-to-head points; 5) Head-to-head goal difference; 6) Head-to-head away goals scored; 7) Play-off (only if deciding champion, European competitions, or relegation); 8) Draw.
(O) Play-off winners

==== Results summary ====
Overall								Home						Away					
Pld	W	D	L	GF	GA	GD	Pts	W	D	L	GF	GA	GD	W	D	L	GF	GA	GD
34	14	6	14	56	54	+2	48	10	2	5	35	27	+8	4	4	9	21	27	−6

Source: League matches

==== League matches ====
12 August 2015 1	PEC Zwolle	2–2	SC Cambuur	Zwolle
	Dirk Marcellis 31'; Sheraldo Becker 33'	Report	70' Erik Bakker; 77' Sjoerd Overgoor	Stadium: IJsseldelta Stadion; Attendance: 11,650; Referee: Dennis Higler

15 August 2015 2	De Graafschap	0–3	PEC Zwolle	Doetinchem
		Report	50' Wouter Marinus; 61' Bart van Hintum; 66' Sheraldo Becker	Stadium: De Vijverberg; Attendance: 8,100; Referee: Allard Lindhout

23 August 2015 3	PEC Zwolle	2–1	FC Twente	Zwolle
	Lars Veldwijk 26' (pen.); Ben Rienstra 63'	Report	46' Hakim Ziyech	Stadium: IJsseldelta Stadion; Attendance: 12,123; Referee: Kevin Blom

29 August 2015 4	SC Heerenveen	1–1	PEC Zwolle	Heerenveen
	Sam Larsson 4'	Report	59' Lars Veldwijk	Stadium: Abe Lenstra Stadion; Attendance: 22,763; Referee: Pol van Boekel

12 September 2015 5	PEC Zwolle	3–0	Excelsior	Zwolle
	Lars Veldwijk 13', 25', 57'	Report		Stadium: IJsseldelta Stadion; Attendance: 11,800; Referee: Danny Makkelie

19 September 2015 6	PEC Zwolle	2–1	ADO Den Haag	Zwolle
	Sheraldo Becker 69'; Lars Veldwijk 79'	Report	35' Mike Havenaar	Stadium: IJsseldelta Stadion; Attendance: 12,150; Referee: Ed Janssen

27 September 2015 7	Feyenoord	2–0	PEC Zwolle	Rotterdam
	Dirk Kuyt 54'; Eljero Elia 82'	Report		Stadium: De Kuip; Attendance: 47,500; Referee: Björn Kuipers

3 October 2015 8	Willem II	0–1	PEC Zwolle	Tilburg
		Report	43' Ouasim Bouy	Stadium: Koning Willem II Stadion; Attendance: 11,500; Referee: Richard Liesveld

18 October 2015 9	PEC Zwolle	1–5	Vitesse	Zwolle
	Thomas Lam 15'	Report	7' Lewis Baker; 21' Dominic Solanke; 44' Valeri Qazaishvili; 52' Denys Oliynyk; 78' Milot Rashica	Stadium: IJsseldelta Stadion; Attendance: 12,250; Referee: Pol van Boekel

23 October 2015 10	PEC Zwolle	1–2	FC Utrecht	Zwolle
	Wouter Marinus 13'	Report	25', 90+3' (pen.) Sébastian Haller	Stadium: IJsseldelta Stadion; Attendance: 12,300; Referee: Eric Braamhaar

31 October 2015 11	FC Groningen	2–0	PEC Zwolle	Groningen
	Michael de Leeuw 5'; Lorenzo Burnet 35'	Report		Stadium: Euroborg; Attendance: 21,565; Referee: Jeroen Manschot

7 November 2015 12	PEC Zwolle	1–1	Heracles Almelo	Zwolle
	Stefan Nijland 90+4'	Report	17' Wout Weghorst	Stadium: IJsseldelta Stadion; Attendance: 12,420; Referee: Dennis Higler

21 November 2015 13	Roda JC Kerkrade	0–5	PEC Zwolle	Kerkrade
		Report	4' Wouter Marinus; 14', 47' Ryan Thomas; 60' Lars Veldwijk; 90+2' Stefan Nijland	Stadium: Parkstad Limburg Stadion; Attendance: 14,378; Referee: Danny Makkelie

29 November 2015 14	PEC Zwolle	0–2	Ajax	Zwolle
		Report	37' Amin Younes; 86' Thulani Serero	Stadium: IJsseldelta Stadion; Attendance: 12,500; Referee: Kevin Blom

6 December 2015 15	NEC	2–2	PEC Zwolle	Nijmegen
	Janio Bikel 53'; Anthony Limbombe 62'	Report	21' Trent Sainsbury; 44' Lars Veldwijk	Stadium: Stadion de Goffert; Attendance: 10,503; Referee: Serdar Gözübüyük

13 December 2015 16	PEC Zwolle	2–1	AZ	Zwolle
	Queensy Menig 36'; Kingsley Ehizibue 45'	Report	90+4' Muamer Tanković	Stadium: IJsseldelta Stadion; Attendance: 12,120; Referee: Jochem Kamphuis

19 December 2015 17	PSV	3–2	PEC Zwolle	Eindhoven
	Gastón Pereiro 7', 15'; Luuk de Jong 75'	Report	40' (pen.) Bram van Polen; 43' Lars Veldwijk	Stadium: Philips Stadion; Attendance: 34,000; Referee: Dennis Higler

16 January 2016 18	PEC Zwolle	5–2	SC Heerenveen	Zwolle
	Dirk Marcellis 12'; Bram van Polen 20', 55' (pen.); Wout Brama 77'; Stefan Nijland 86'	Report	46' Mitchell te Vrede; 79' Jerry St. Juste	Stadium: IJsseldelta Stadion; Attendance: 12,320; Referee: Martin van den Kerkhof

24 January 2016 19	FC Utrecht	1–0	PEC Zwolle	Utrecht
	Ruud Boymans 87'	Report		Stadium: Stadion Galgenwaard; Attendance: 21,715; Referee: Kevin Blom

27 January 2016 20	Vitesse	1–1	PEC Zwolle	Arnhem
	Bram van Polen 65' (o.g.)	Report	68' Dirk Marcellis	Stadium: GelreDome; Attendance: 14,876; Referee: Ed Janssen

30 January 2016 21	PEC Zwolle	1–3	FC Groningen	Zwolle
	Thomas Lam 56'	Report	17' Alexander Sørloth; 62' Michael de Leeuw; 77' Danny Hoesen	Stadium: IJsseldelta Stadion; Attendance: 12,225; Referee: Dennis Higler

6 February 2016 22	Heracles Almelo	2–0	PEC Zwolle	Almelo
	Iliass Bel Hassani 54'; Jaroslav Navrátil 81'	Report		Stadium: Polman Stadion; Attendance: 10,543; Referee: Pol van Boekel

14 February 2016 23	PEC Zwolle	3–1	Feyenoord	Zwolle
	Lars Veldwijk 15', 50'; Kingsley Ehizibue 90+3'	Report	42' Sven van Beek	Stadium: IJsseldelta Stadion; Attendance: 12,500; Referee: Serdar Gözübüyük

19 February 2016 24	ADO Den Haag	0–2	PEC Zwolle	The Hague
		Report	44' Rick Dekker; 90+1' Lars Veldwijk	Stadium: Kyocera Stadion; Attendance: 11,784; Referee: Jeroen Manschot

27 February 2016 25	SC Cambuur	1–0	PEC Zwolle	Leeuwarden
	Jack Byrne 85'	Report		Stadium: Cambuur Stadion; Attendance: 9,775; Referee: Siemen Mulder

5 March 2016 26	PEC Zwolle	2–1	De Graafschap	Zwolle
	Stefan Nijland 23', 32'	Report	67' Nathan Kabasele	Stadium: IJsseldelta Stadion; Attendance: 12,250; Referee: Edwin van de Graaf

12 March 2016 27	FC Twente	2–1	PEC Zwolle	Enschede
	Hakim Ziyech 47'; Jerson Cabral 55'	Report	28' Kingsley Ehizibue	Stadium: De Grolsch Veste; Attendance: 27,200; Referee: Danny Makkelie

19 March 2016 28	PEC Zwolle	4–1	Willem II	Zwolle
	Dirk Marcellis 18'; Queensy Menig 23'; Lars Veldwijk 60'; Stefan Nijland 90+3'	Report	37' Erik Falkenburg	Stadium: IJsseldelta Stadion; Attendance: 12,185; Referee: Jochem Kamphuis

3 April 2016 29	Ajax	3–0	PEC Zwolle	Amsterdam
	Lasse Schöne 2'; Arkadiusz Milik 29', 40'	Report		Stadium: Amsterdam Arena; Attendance: 51,862; Referee: Kevin Blom

8 April 2016 30	PEC Zwolle	3–1	Roda JC Kerkrade	Zwolle
	Queensy Menig 49'; Ouasim Bouy 73', 78'	Report	41' Marcos Gullón	Stadium: IJsseldelta Stadion; Attendance: 12,500; Referee: Siemen Mulder

16 April 2016 31	AZ	5–1	PEC Zwolle	Alkmaar
	Vincent Janssen 20' (pen.), 25', 64', 83'; Dabney dos Santos 64'	Report	63' Kingsley Ehizibue	Stadium: AFAS Stadion; Attendance: 16,341; Referee: Jeroen Manschot

20 April 2016 32	PEC Zwolle	2–0	NEC	Zwolle
	Sheraldo Becker 17'; Queensy Menig 27'	Report		Stadium: IJsseldelta Stadion; Attendance: 12,352; Referee: Edwin van de Graaf

1 May 2016 33	Excelsior	2–2	PEC Zwolle	Rotterdam
	Tom van Weert 61'; Daan Bovenberg 80'	Report	15' Lars Veldwijk; 65' Queensy Menig	Stadium: Stadion Woudestein; Attendance: 3,750; Referee: Bas Nijhuis

8 May 2016 34	PEC Zwolle	1–3	PSV	Zwolle
	Ouasim Bouy 66'	Report	34' Jürgen Locadia; 43', 67' Luuk de Jong	Stadium: IJsseldelta Stadion; Attendance: 12,500; Referee: Pol van Boekel

=== Play-offs ===
12 May 2016 First round	PEC Zwolle	0–0	FC Utrecht	Zwolle
		Report		Stadium: IJsseldelta Stadion; Attendance: 8,125; Referee: Kevin Blom

15 May 2016 First round	FC Utrecht	5–2	PEC Zwolle	Utrecht
	Sébastien Haller 5'; Bart Ramselaar 23'; Christian Kum 28' Giovanni Troupée 62' Sébastien Haller 73' (pen.)	Report	58' Queensy Menig 58' Wout Brama	Stadium: Stadion Galgenwaard; Attendance: 15,126; Referee: Dennis Higler

=== KNVB Cup ===
24 September 2015 Second round	Feyenoord	3–0	PEC Zwolle	Rotterdam
	Marcellis 19' (o.g.); Kuyt 60', 69'	Report		Stadium: De Kuip; Attendance: 47,500; Referee: Nijhuis

== Statistics ==
=== Squad details and appearances ===
Nr.	Nat.	Name	Eredivisie		Play-offs		KNVB Cup		Total		Contract End	Season	Signed from	Debut
Nr.	Nat.	Name	G	Goal	G	Goal	G	Goal	G	Goal	Contract End	Season	Signed from	Debut
Goalkeepers
1	(Netherlands)	Mickey van der Hart	18	0	0	0	1	0	19	0	2018	1st	(Netherlands) AFC Ajax	24 September 2015
16	(Belgium)	Kevin Begois	16	0	1	0	0	0	17	0	2017	3rd	(Netherlands) FC Den Bosch	4 August 2013
25	(Netherlands)	Boy de Jong	1	0	1	0	0	0	2	0	2016	2nd	(Netherlands) Feyenoord	19 December 2015
40	(Netherlands)	Mike Hauptmeijer	0	0	0	0	0	0	0	0	Amateur	1st	Academy	–
Defenders
2	(Netherlands)	Bram van Polen	29	3	2	0	1	0	32	3	2017	10th	(Netherlands) SBV Vitesse	12 October 2007
3	(Australia)	Trent Sainsbury	9	1	0	0	0	0	9	1	2016	3rd	(Australia) Central Coast Mariners FC	6 February 2014
4	(Netherlands)	Dirk Marcellis	29	4	2	0	1	0	32	4	2017	1st	(Netherlands) NAC Breda	12 August 2015
5	(Netherlands)	Bart van Hintum	24	1	2	0	1	0	27	1	2016	5th	(Netherlands) FC Dordrecht	19 August 2011
17	(Czech Republic)	Josef Kvída	0	0	0	0	0	0	0	0	2017	1st	(Czech Republic) 1. FK Příbram	—
20	(Netherlands)	Kingsley Ehizibue	25	4	2	0	0	0	27	4	2017	2nd	Academy	13 December 2014
22	(Netherlands)	Bart Schenkeveld	12	0	0	0	0	0	12	0	2018	1st	(Netherlands) Heracles Almelo	12 August 2015
28	(Finland)	Thomas Lam	32	2	2	0	1	0	36	2	2016	2nd	(Netherlands) AZ	16 August 2014
29	(Netherlands)	Sander van Looy	0	0	0	0	0	0	0	0	Amateur	1st	Academy	—
34	(Netherlands)	Pim ten Have	0	0	0	0	0	0	0	0	Amateur	1st	Academy	–
39	(Netherlands)	Dalvin Havertong	0	0	0	0	0	0	0	0	Amateur	1st	(Netherlands) Sparta Rotterdam	—
45	(Netherlands)	Mark Bruintjes	1	0	0	0	0	0	1	0	Amateur	1st	Academy	14 February 2016
48	(Netherlands)	Tarik Evre	1	0	0	0	0	0	1	0	Amateur	1st	Academy	27 February 2016
Midfielders
6	(Netherlands)	Mustafa Saymak	0	0	0	0	0	0	0	0	2018	5th	Academy	5 August 2011
8	(Netherlands)	Ouasim Bouy	25	4	2	0	1	0	28	4	On loan	1st	(Italy) Juventus FC	12 September 2015
14	(Netherlands)	Wout Brama	25	1	2	1	1	0	28	2	2017	2nd	(Netherlands) FC Twente	19 October 2014
18	(Netherlands)	Wouter Marinus	31	3	0	0	1	0	32	3	2019	2nd	(Netherlands) sc Heerenveen (Academy)	12 August 2015
19	(Netherlands)	Rick Dekker	25	1	2	0	1	0	28	1	2018	2nd	(Netherlands) Feyenoord (Academy)	5 October 2014
21	(Netherlands)	Abdel Malek El Hasnaoui	13	0	2	0	1	0	16	0	2016	1e	(Netherlands) AFC Ajax	12 August 2015
23	(Netherlands)	Ben Rienstra	3	1	0	0	0	0	3	1	2016	2nd	(Netherlands) Heracles Almelo	8 August 2014
23	(Netherlands)	Dario Tanda	3	0	0	0	0	0	3	0	Amateur	1st	No club	19 February 2016
27	(Netherlands)	Jeroen Buitenhuis	0	0	0	0	0	0	0	0	Amateur	1st	Academy	—
38	(Brazil)	Gustavo Hebling	7	0	1	0	0	0	8	0	On loan	1st	(France) Paris Saint-Germain	21 November 2015
42	(Netherlands)	Sander Thomas	3	0	0	0	0	0	3	0	Amateur	1st	Academy	6 December 2015
Forwards
7	(Netherlands)	Sheraldo Becker	24	4	2	0	1	0	27	4	On loan	2nd	(Netherlands) AFC Ajax	17 January 2015
9	(Netherlands)	Lars Veldwijk	33	14	2	0	1	0	36	14	On loan	1st	(England) Nottingham Forest FC	12 August 2015
10	(Netherlands)	Stefan Nijland	26	6	0	0	1	0	27	6	2018	3rd	(Netherlands) PSV	10 August 2013
11	(Netherlands)	Queensy Menig	33	5	2	1	1	0	36	6	On loan	1st	(Netherlands) AFC Ajax	12 August 2015
15	(Netherlands)	Samet Bulut	1	0	0	0	0	0	1	0	2016	1st	(Netherlands) AFC Ajax	12 March 2016
24	(Bosnia and Herzegovina)	Boban Lazić	5	0	0	0	0	0	5	0	2016	1st	No club	15 August 2015
26	(Bosnia and Herzegovina)	Boris Rasevic	1	0	0	0	0	0	1	0	Amateur	3rd	Academy	30 November 2013
30	(New Zealand)	Ryan Thomas	12	2	0	0	0	0	12	2	2019	3rd	(New Zealand) Western Suburbs FC	2 November 2013
33	(Greece)	Athanasios Karagounis	0	0	0	0	0	0	0	0	2018	3rd	(Greece) Atromitos	18 January 2014
37	(Papua New Guinea)	David Browne	0	0	0	0	0	0	0	0	Amateur	1st	Academy	—
–	(Netherlands)	Youness Mokhtar	0	0	0	0	0	0	0	0	2018	3rd	(Saudi Arabia) Al-Nassr	25 August 2012
No.	Nat.	Name	G	Goal	G	Goal	G	Goal	G	Goal	Contract End	Season	Signed from	Debut
No.	Nat.	Name	Eredivisie		Play-offs		KNVB Cup		Total		Contract End	Season	Signed from	Debut

=== Discipline ===
The list is sorted by surname when total cards are equal.

Rnk	Pos	No.	Player	Eredivisie			Play-offs			KNVB Cup			Total			
Rnk	Pos	No.	Player	Yellow card	Yellowred card	Red card	Yellow card	Yellowred card	Red card	Yellow card	Yellowred card	Red card	Yellow card	Yellowred card	Red card	T
1	DF	28	(Finland) Thomas Lam	8	0	0	0	0	0	0	0	0	8	0	0	8
2	DF	2	(Netherlands) Bram van Polen	6	0	0	0	0	0	1	0	0	7	0	0	7
3	MF	8	(Netherlands) Ouasim Bouy	3	1	1	0	0	0	1	0	0	4	1	1	6
4	DF	3	(Australia) Trent Sainsbury	5	0	0	0	0	0	0	0	0	5	0	0	5
4	MF	14	(Netherlands) Wout Brama	5	0	0	0	0	0	0	0	0	5	0	0	5
4	MF	19	(Netherlands) Rick Dekker	4	0	0	1	0	0	0	0	0	5	0	0	5
7	FW	30	(New Zealand) Ryan Thomas	4	0	0	0	0	0	0	0	0	4	0	0	4
8	DF	4	(Netherlands) Dirk Marcellis	3	0	0	1	0	0	0	0	0	4	0	0	4
9	DF	22	(Netherlands) Bart Schenkeveld	3	0	0	0	0	0	0	0	0	3	0	0	3
10	FW	7	(Netherlands) Sheraldo Becker	2	0	0	0	0	0	0	0	0	2	0	0	2
10	DF	20	(Netherlands) Kingsley Ehizibue	2	0	0	0	0	0	0	0	0	2	0	0	2
10	MF	18	(Netherlands) Wouter Marinus	2	0	0	0	0	0	0	0	0	2	0	0	2
10	FW	10	(Netherlands) Stefan Nijland	2	0	0	0	0	0	0	0	0	2	0	0	2
10	DF	5	(Netherlands) Bart van Hintum	1	0	0	0	1	0	0	0	0	1	1	0	2
14	DF	48	(Netherlands) Tarik Evre	1	0	0	0	0	0	0	0	0	1	0	0	1
14	MF	21	(Netherlands) Abdel Malek El Hasnaoui	1	0	0	0	0	0	0	0	0	1	0	0	1
14	FW	24	(Bosnia and Herzegovina) Boban Lazić	1	0	0	0	0	0	0	0	0	1	0	0	1
14	MF	23	(Netherlands) Ben Rienstra	1	0	0	0	0	0	0	0	0	1	0	0	1
14	FW	9	(Netherlands) Lars Veldwijk	1	0	0	0	0	0	0	0	0	1	0	0	1
14	GK	1	(Netherlands) Mickey van der Hart	0	0	1	0	0	0	0	0	0	0	0	1	1
Total				54	1	2	0	0	0	2	0	0	56	1	2	59

=== Top scorers ===
The list is sorted by Eredivisie goals when total goals are equal.

Rnk	Pos	No.	Player	Eredivisie	Play-offs	KNVB Cup	Friendly	Total
1	FW	9	(Netherlands) Lars Veldwijk	14	0	0	7	21
2	FW	10	(Netherlands) Stefan Nijland	6	0	0	4	10
3	FW	7	(Netherlands) Sheraldo Becker	4	0	0	4	8
4	FW	11	(Netherlands) Queensy Menig	5	1	0	0	6
5	DF	20	(Netherlands) Kingsley Ehizibue	4	0	0	1	5
5	MF	–	(Netherlands) Jesper Drost	0	0	0	5	5
5	DF	2	(Netherlands) Bram van Polen	3	0	0	2	5
8	DF	6	(Netherlands) Ouasim Bouy	4	0	0	0	4
8	DF	4	(Netherlands) Dirk Marcellis	4	0	0	0	4
8	MF	18	(Netherlands) Wouter Marinus	3	0	0	1	4
11	MF	23	(Netherlands) Ben Rienstra	1	0	0	2	3
12	DF	28	(Finland) Thomas Lam	2	0	0	0	2
12	FW	30	(New Zealand) Ryan Thomas	2	0	0	0	2
12	MF	14	(Netherlands) Wout Brama	1	1	0	0	2
12	MF	6	(Netherlands) Mustafa Saymak	0	0	0	2	2
16	MF	19	(Netherlands) Rick Dekker	1	0	0	0	1
16	DF	5	(Netherlands) Bart van Hintum	1	0	0	0	1
16	DF	3	(Australia) Trent Sainsbury	1	0	0	0	1
16	DF	–	(Germany) Emmanuel Mbende	0	0	0	1	1
Own goals				0	0	0	1	1
Total				56	2	0	28	86
