= Bart Schenkeveld =

Dutch footballer

Personal information
- Full name: Bartholomew Schenkeveld
- Date of birth: 28 August 1991 (age 35)
- Place of birth: Den Hoorn, Netherlands
- Height: 1.84 m (6 ft 1/2 in)
- Position: Centre-back

Youth career
- 1996–1997: SV Den Hoorn
- 1997–2009: Feyenoord

Senior career*
Years	Team	Apps	(Gls)
2009–2012	Feyenoord	5	(0)
2012	→ Excelsior (loan)	12	(2)
2012–2015	Heracles Almelo	61	(0)
2015–2017	Zwolle	32	(1)
2017–2019	Melbourne City	52	(1)
2019–2025	Panathinaikos	132	(4)
2025–2026	Al-Khaleej	20	(0)

International career
2009–2010	Netherlands U19	1	(0)
- * Club domestic league appearances and goals as of 7 March 2026

Bartholomew Schenkeveld (Dutch pronunciation: [ˈbɑrt ˈsxɛŋkəˌvɛlt]; born 28 August 1991) is a Dutch professional footballer who plays as a centre-back. Besides the Netherlands, he has played in Australia and Greece.

== Early life ==
Schenkeveld was born and raised in Den Hoorn, South Holland, a village between the cities The Hague and Rotterdam in the Netherlands.

== Club career ==
=== Youth career ===
At the age of five, Schenkeveld started his youth career at the local amateur club SV Den Hoorn. After one season, Schenkeveld joined the Feyenoord youth academy as right winger, but got quickly turned into a defender. Schenkeveld successfully went through the complete academy, but had a major injury setback at the age of 15. The youngster partially tore his cruciate ligament, which caused him to be out for five months. When he was about to make his comeback, he tore his cruciate ligament completely. In total, Schenkeveld had to recover for almost two years.

On 29 November 2008, Schenkeveld was able to make his comeback for Feyenoord U19 in the youth match against Sparta Rotterdam U19 (2–1). Feyenoord youth coach Jean-Paul van Gastel was impressed by Schenkeveld's comeback: "If you work this hard for one-and-a-half years and you come back like this, it's unbelievable. I was standing at the sideline with goosebumps."

=== Feyenoord (2009–2012) ===
On 29 November 2009, exactly one year after his comeback, Schenkeveld made his official debut for Feyenoord's first team in the Eredivisie away match against ADO Den Haag (0–2). Due to Giovanni van Bronckhorst's suspension, Schenkeveld played on the right back position, as Kelvin Leerdam switched to left back.

On 7 January 2010, Schenkeveld signed his first professional contract with the Rotterdam club. It was confirmed that he will stay in de Kuip until summer 2012, with an option for another season.

On 23 December 2011, Schenkeveld joined another Rotterdam based team Excelsior on a loan deal.

=== Heracles Almelo and PEC Zwolle (2012–2017) ===
Between 2012 and 2017, Schenkeveld played for Eredivisie clubs Heracles Almelo and Zwolle.

=== Melbourne City ===
In August 2017, A-League club Melbourne City announced it had signed Schenkeveld on a 2-year deal. On 22 January 2019, Schenkeveld scored his first goal for the club in a stoppage time winner against the Western Sydney Wanderers FC. He departed Melbourne City in July 2019.

=== Panathinaikos ===
On 28 August 2019, Superleague Greece club Panathinaikos announced they had signed Schenkeveld on a two-year deal. He had a good first season with the Greens, receiving positive comments for his performance despite the poor team results.

On 13 November 2020, Schenkeveld signed a contract extension, until the summer of 2023. On 18 May 2021, he underwent surgery to restore instability in his ankle and stayed out of action for 6 months. After his injury, he played two games with Panathinaikos B. After his return to the first team he became again a starter defender and he slotted in seamlessly, forging a strong pairing in the heart of defence with Fran Vélez. Shenkeveld proved pivotal for the Greens as they went six straight league games without conceding a single goal at the 2021–22 Superleague play offs. On 11 May 2022 he scored a goal at the Derby of the eternal enemies against Olympiacos, helping Panathinaikos take a very important away win which helped them return to European competitions after a five-year absence.

On 16 December 2022, Schenkeveld signed a new contract, running until the summer of 2025.

=== Al-Khaleej ===
On 4 August 2025, Schenkeveld joined Saudi Pro League club Al-Khaleej.

== International career ==
=== Youth teams ===
Schenkeveld made his international youth debut on 6 December 2005. Schenkeveld was the captain of the youngest Dutch representative team, the Netherlands U15, in the friendly home match against Ireland U15 (3–1). The youngster continued his international career in the Netherlands U16, but was forced to skip the U17 and U18 representative teams due to his major injury.

==== Netherlands U19 ====
After his comeback, Schenkeveld restarted his international career on 20 August 2009, as he got selected for the Netherlands U19 by youth coach Wim van Zwam for the first time.

== Career statistics ==
=== Club ===
As of 9 March 2025

Club	Season	League			Cup		Continental		Total	
Club	Season	Division	Apps	Goals	Apps	Goals	Apps	Goals	Apps	Goals
Feyenoord	2009–10	Eredivisie	5	0	2	0	—		7	0
Feyenoord	2010–11	Eredivisie	0	0	0	0	0	0	0	0
Feyenoord	2011–12	Eredivisie	0	0	0	0	—		0	0
Feyenoord	Total		5	0	2	0	0	0	7	0
Excelsior (loan)	2011–12	Eredivisie	12	2	0	0	—		12	2
Heracles Almelo	2012–13	Eredivisie	12	0	1	0	—		13	0
Heracles Almelo	2013–14	Eredivisie	31	0	3	0	—		34	0
Heracles Almelo	2014–15	Eredivisie	18	0	0	0	—		18	0
Heracles Almelo	Total		61	0	4	0	—		65	0
PEC Zwolle	2015–16	Eredivisie	12	0	0	0	—		12	0
PEC Zwolle	2016–17	Eredivisie	20	1	2	0	—		22	1
PEC Zwolle	Total		32	1	2	0	—		34	1
Melbourne City	2017–18	A-League	27	0	2	0	—		29	0
Melbourne City	2018–19	A-League	25	1	3	0	—		28	1
Melbourne City	Total		52	1	5	0	—		57	1
Panathinaikos	2019–20	Super League Greece	29	1	3	1	—		32	2
Panathinaikos	2020–21	Super League Greece	27	1	2	0	—		29	1
Panathinaikos	2021–22	Super League Greece	22	2	5	0	—		27	2
Panathinaikos	2022–23	Super League Greece	27	0	2	0	1	0	30	0
Panathinaikos	2023–24	Super League Greece	17	0	3	0	8	0	28	0
Panathinaikos	2024–25	Super League Greece	11	0	3	0	6	0	20	0
Panathinaikos	Total		133	4	18	1	15	0	164	5
Career total			297	8	31	1	15	0	343	9

== Honours ==
Panathinaikos

- Greek Cup: 2021–22, 2023–24
