= Nicolai Brock-Madsen =

Danish footballer (born 1993)

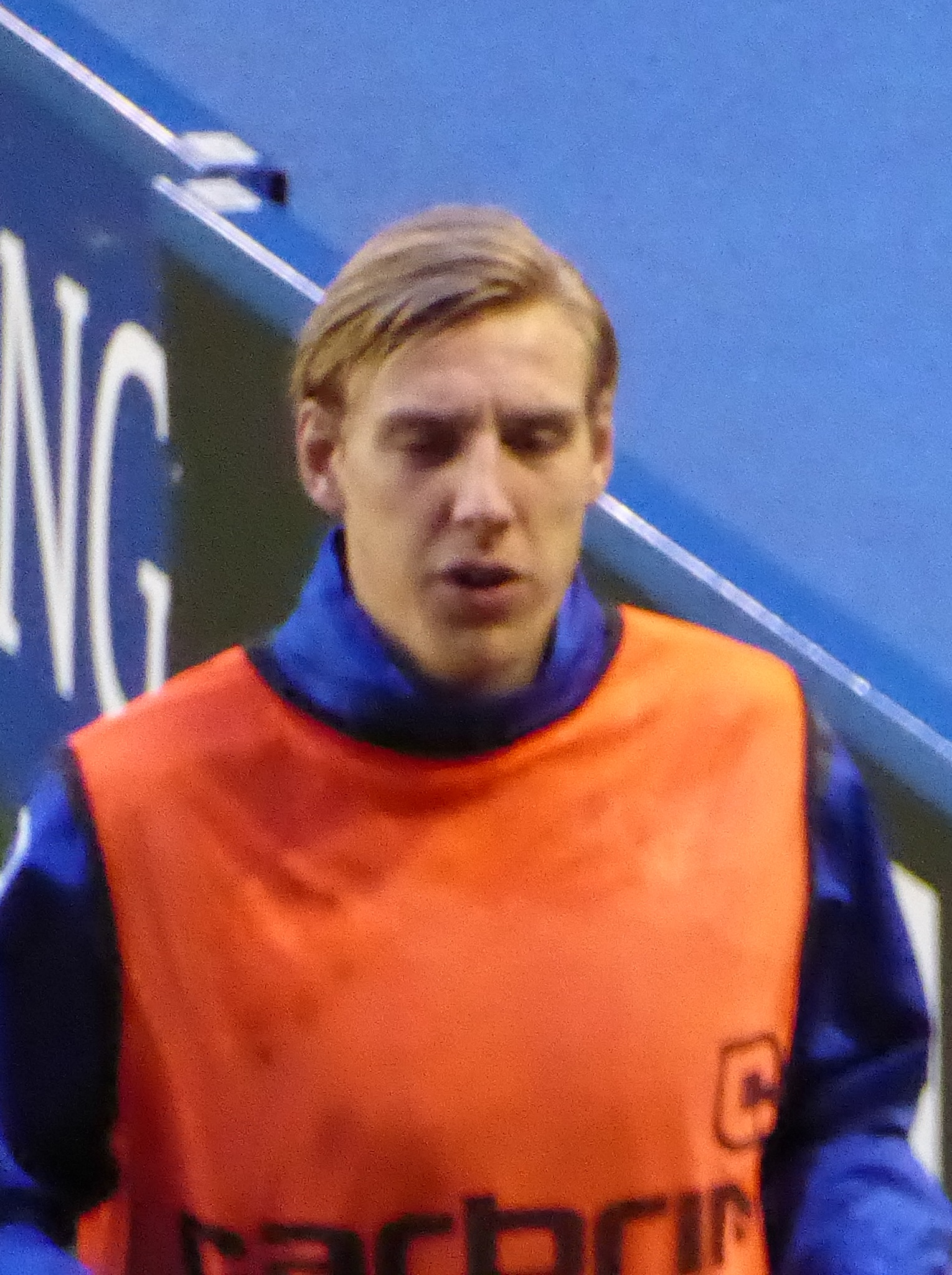
- Brock-Madsen with Birmingham City in January 2016

Personal information
- Full name: Nicolai Brock-Madsen
- Date of birth: 9 January 1993 (age 33)
- Place of birth: Randers, Denmark
- Height: 1.90 m (6 ft 3 in)
- Position: Forward

Youth career
- Helsted Fremad IF
- 2003–2010: Randers Freja

Senior career*
Years	Team	Apps	(Gls)
2010–2015	Randers	90	(16)
2015–2019	Birmingham City	6	(0)
2016–2017	→ PEC Zwolle (loan)	23	(7)
2018	→ Cracovia (loan)	11	(1)
2018	→ St Mirren (loan)	4	(0)
2019–2021	Horsens	51	(5)
2021–2023	Randers	23	(1)
2023	→ Fredericia (loan)	4	(1)

International career
2010–2011	Denmark U18	8	(1)
2011–2012	Denmark U19	15	(4)
2012–2013	Denmark U20	6	(1)
2013–2015	Denmark U21	16	(9)
2016	Denmark U23	6	(3)
- * Club domestic league appearances and goals as of 16 June 2023

Nicolai Brock-Madsen (born 9 January 1993) is a Danish former professional footballer who played as a forward.

He spent five seasons with Randers FC before joining Birmingham City of the English Championship in 2015. He has also played on loan at Dutch club PEC Zwolle, Polish Ekstraklasa club Cracovia and Scottish Premiership club St Mirren, before his contract with Birmingham was cancelled by mutual consent in January 2019. He has represented Denmark at levels up to under-21 and at the 2016 Summer Olympics.

== Club career ==
=== Randers FC ===
Brock-Madsen signed a three-year contract with his hometown club, Randers FC, and scored his first goal in a Europa League match against F91 Dudelange which ended 6–1.

In the 2012–13 season Brock-Madsen was a vital part of the Randers team that ended third in the league, playing a total of 28 league games and forming an attacking duo with Randers top-scorer Ronnie Schwartz. Brock-Madsen also helped the team reach the cup final where they lost to 0–1 to Esbjerg FB.

=== Birmingham City ===
On 21 August 2015, Brock-Madsen signed a four-year deal with English Football League Championship (second-tier) club Birmingham City. The fee was undisclosed, but was believed by the BBC to be "in the region of £500,000, with possible add-ons taking it up to £1m." He made his debut four days later, as a second-half substitute in Birmingham's 2–0 League Cup win against Gillingham. He made his first appearance in the Football League on 15 September, again as a substitute, playing alongside Clayton Donaldson as Birmingham failed to come back from 1–0 down at home to Nottingham Forest in what was their first defeat of the season.

Brock-Madsen made his first start for Birmingham on 21 November at home to Charlton Athletic, playing as a lone striker in place of Donaldson who was injured while on international duty. Manager Gary Rowett claimed that a penalty should have been awarded when Brock-Madsen's arm was pulled back; Birmingham lost 1–0. He started the next two matches, in Donaldson's continued absence, but injury intervened, he gave way to loanee James Vaughan, and after Donaldson regained fitness, Brock-Madsen made no more first-team appearances in the 2015–16 season.

==== PEC Zwolle (loan) ====
International duty at the Rio Olympics meant Brock-Madsen missed the start of Birmingham's 2016–17 season. On the last day of the transfer window, he joined Dutch top-flight club PEC Zwolle on loan for the season. The Dutch club reported that an option to purchase was included in the deal. Brock-Madsen made his Eredivisie debut in the club's next match, in the starting eleven for the visit of Utrecht on 10 September; his side took a one-goal lead which he had chances to extend, but the visitors equalised via a stoppage-time penalty. He scored twice in PEC's 4–1 win in the Dutch Cup first round away to Derde Klasse (fourth-tier) club DVS '33. Injury disrupted the first half of his season, but when the campaign resumed after the winter break, he went on a run of five goals in the next six matches, the last of which was scored on the day his girlfriend gave birth to their son. He finished the season with 10 goals from 25 appearances in all competitions.

Although PEC Zwolle hoped to keep the player, it was reported that he would return to Birmingham to try and impress new manager Harry Redknapp, but Redknapp made it clear he had no future at the club. A free-transfer move to a Dutch club fell through, and the player rejected offers to return to Denmark. Redknapp's successor, Steve Cotterill, chose not to select him despite the team's lack of goals.

==== Cracovia (loan) ====
Brock-Madsen joined Polish Ekstraklasa club KS Cracovia on 18 January 2018, on loan until the end of the 2017–18 season with an option to make the move permanent. He made his debut when the Ekstraklasa resumed after the winter break as a second-half substitute in the 2–1 win at home to Śląsk Wrocław on 10 February, and made eleven appearances during his loan spell, scoring once.

==== St Mirren (loan) ====
Brock-Madsen returned to Birmingham after his loan with Cracovia, and was then loaned to Scottish Premiership club St Mirren in August 2018. His first appearance came on 11 August in the starting eleven for the visit to Rangers. With half an hour gone and the hosts leading 2–0, Brock-Madsen broke free and was brought down by Ross McCrorie, who was sent off. St Mirren were unable to profit from the numerical advantage, and Brock-Madsen was substituted after 69 minutes. After five appearances without scoring, he was told he was not in the plans of the club's new manager, Oran Kearney. He returned to Birmingham in mid-October to train, but would not be eligible to play for them until the loan expired on 1 January 2019. Birmingham later confirmed that his contract would be cancelled by mutual consent as of that date.

=== Return to Denmark ===
On 21 January 2019, Brock-Madsen signed a six-month deal with Danish Superliga club AC Horsens.

After Horsens suffered relegation to the Danish 1st Division, Brock-Madsen signed with Randers, where he returned after an absence of six years. He penned a two-year contract, and joined the club ahead of the 2021–22 Danish Superliga. On transfer deadline day, 31 January 2023, Brock-Madsen was loaned out to Danish 1st Division side FC Fredericia for the rest of the season. He left both Fredericia and Randers at the end of the 2022–23 season, as both contracts expired.

On 6 February 2024, 31-year old Brock-Madsen announced his retirement from football.

== International career ==
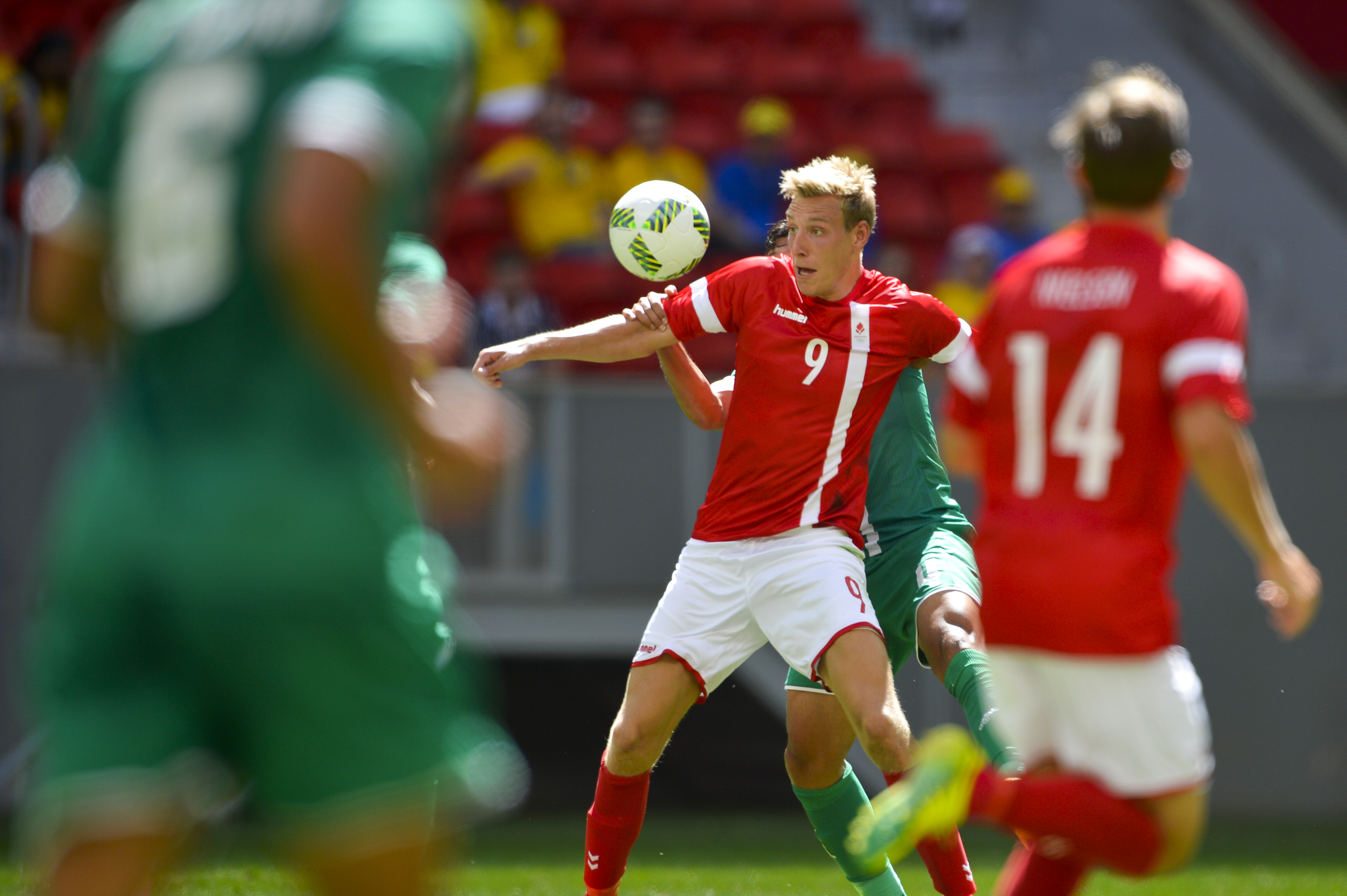
Brock-Madsen during the 2016 Summer Olympics

Brock-Madsen represented Denmark internationally at levels from under-18 to under-21.

On 10 December 2012, Brock was called up for Denmark's tour of USA in January.

Brock-Madsen was called up to Denmark's Olympic training squad for three friendly matches in June 2016 which formed part of their preparations for the Games in August. After Honduras U23 took a two-goal lead, he scored twice to help his team recover to win the match 4–3, against the Nigeria team he missed an early penalty but Denmark still won 6–2, and in the third match, hosts South Korea led 1–0 until Brock-Madsen equalised in stoppage time. At the Games proper, he played in all three of Denmark's matches in the group stage, from which they qualified in second place, but took no part in the quarter-final defeat against Nigeria.

== Career statistics ==
As of match played 4 October 2020

Appearances and goals by club, season and competition
Club	Season	League			National Cup		League Cup		Other		Total	
Club	Season	Division	Apps	Goals	Apps	Goals	Apps	Goals	Apps	Goals	Apps	Goals
Randers FC	2010–11	Superliga	0	0	0	0	—		3 (Note: Appearances and goals in UEFA Europa League)	1	3	1
Randers FC	2011–12	1st Division	14	2	1	0	—		—		15	2
Randers FC	2012–13	Superliga	28	5	4	1	—		—		32	6
Randers FC	2013–14	Superliga	27	4	1	0	—		2	0	30	4
Randers FC	2014–15	Superliga	17	4	4	1	—		—		21	5
Randers FC	2015–16	Superliga	4	1	0	0	—		3	0	7	1
Randers FC	Total		90	16	10	2	—		8	1	108	19
Birmingham City	2015–16	Championship	6	0	0	0	2	0	—		8	0
Birmingham City	2016–17	Championship	0	0	—		0	0	—		0	0
Birmingham City	2017–18	Championship	0	0	0	0	0	0	—		0	0
Birmingham City	2017–18	Championship	0	0	0	0	0	0	—		0	0
Birmingham City	Total		6	0	0	0	2	0	—		8	0
PEC Zwolle (loan)	2016–17	Eredivisie	23	7	2	3	—		—		25	10
Cracovia (loan)	2017–18	Ekstraklasa	11	1	—		—		—		11	1
St Mirren (loan)	2018–19	Scottish Premiership	4	0	0	0	1	0	—		5	0
AC Horsens	2018–19	Superliga	6	0	0	0	—		2 (Note: Appearances in Danish Superliga relegation playoffs)	1	8	1
AC Horsens	2019–20	Superliga	25	3	1	0	—		—		26	3
AC Horsens	2020–21	Superliga	2	0	0	0	—		—		2	0
AC Horsens	Total		33	3	1	0	—		2	1	36	4
Career total			167	27	13	5	3	0	10	2	193	34
