= Max de Boom =

Dutch footballer

Personal information
- Date of birth: 17 February 1996 (age 30)
- Place of birth: Utrecht, Netherlands
- Height: 1.75 m (5 ft 9 in)
- Position: Winger

Youth career
- Heerenveen

Senior career*
Years	Team	Apps	(Gls)
2014–2017	PEC Zwolle	2	(0)
2017	Helmond Sport	6	(0)
2017–2018	VV Pelikaan-S		
2020–2021	ONS Sneek		
2021–2022	VV Groningen		
- * Club domestic league appearances and goals as of 21 May 2017

Max de Boom (born 17 February 1996) is a Dutch retired footballer who played as a winger.

== Club career ==
De Boom came through the SC Heerenveen youth system and joined PEC Zwolle in 2014. He made his Eredivisie debut against Willem II in the 2014/15 season. However, after being released, De Boom went down to the Dutch second division with Helmond Sport in 2017 and to the amateur leagues later that year, when he moved to play for VV Pelikaan-S. After leaving them and being clubless for a while, he joined ONS Sneek in summer 2020.
