= Wouter Marinus =

Dutch footballer

Personal information
- Full name: Wouter Marinus
- Date of birth: 18 February 1995 (age 31)
- Place of birth: Zuidwolde, Netherlands
- Height: 1.77 m (5 ft 10 in)
- Position: Midfielder

Team information
- Current team: ZZVV Zuidwolde

Youth career
- PEC Zwolle

Senior career*
| Years | Team | Apps | (Gls) |
| 2014–2018 | PEC Zwolle | 56 | (4) |
| 2018–2020 | FC Emmen | 14 | (0) |
| 2020–2021 | ZZVV Zuidwolde | | |
| 2021–2022 | FC Differdange 03 | 24 | (1) |
| 2022– | ZZVV Zuidwolde | | |

International career^{‡}
| 2011–2012 | Netherlands U17 | 8 | (1) |
- * Club domestic league appearances and goals as of 1 September 2020 ‡ National team caps and goals as of 14 August 2015

Wouter Marinus (born 18 February 1995) is a Dutch professional footballer who plays as a midfielder for amateur side ZZVV Zuidwolde. He formerly played for PEC Zwolle.
