= Sander Thomas =

Dutch footballer (born 1997)

Personal information
- Full name: Sander Thomas
- Date of birth: 26 June 1997 (age 29)
- Place of birth: Enschede, Netherlands
- Height: 1.72 m (5 ft 8 in)
- Position: Midfielder

Youth career
- FC Twente
- 2015–2016: PEC Zwolle

Senior career*
Years	Team	Apps	(Gls)
2015–2016	PEC Zwolle	3	(0)
2016–2017	Heracles Almelo	2	(0)
2017–2018	Go Ahead Eagles	5	(0)
- * Club domestic league appearances and goals as of 14 January 2017

Sander Thomas (born 26 June 1997) is a Dutch professional footballer who last played for Go Ahead Eagles, as a forward.
