= Sander van Looy =

Dutch footballer (born 1997)

Personal information
- Date of birth: 29 May 1997 (age 29)
- Place of birth: Epe, Netherlands
- Height: 1.96 m (6 ft 5 in)
- Position: Centre back

Team information
- Current team: DVS '33
- Number: 4

Youth career
- 2012–2017: PEC Zwolle

Senior career*
Years	Team	Apps	(Gls)
2017–2018	PEC Zwolle	1	(0)
2020	Falkenbergs FF	18	(0)
2023–2024	SV Meppen	27	(1)
2024–2025	Phönix Lübeck	8	(0)
2025–	DVS '33	10	(1)
- * Club domestic league appearances and goals as of 11 January 2026

Sander van Looy (born 29 May 1997) is a Dutch professional footballer who plays as a centre back for Derde Divisie club DVS '33.

== Career ==
Van Looy joined PEC Zwolle in 2012, and on 11 October 2017 signed his first professional contract for 1+2 years. Van Looy made his professional debut for PEC Zwolle in a 4–0 Eredivisie loss to ADO Den Haag on 22 December 2017.

In March 2025, van Looy joined Derde Divisie club DVS '33.
