= Lars Veldwijk =

South African soccer player

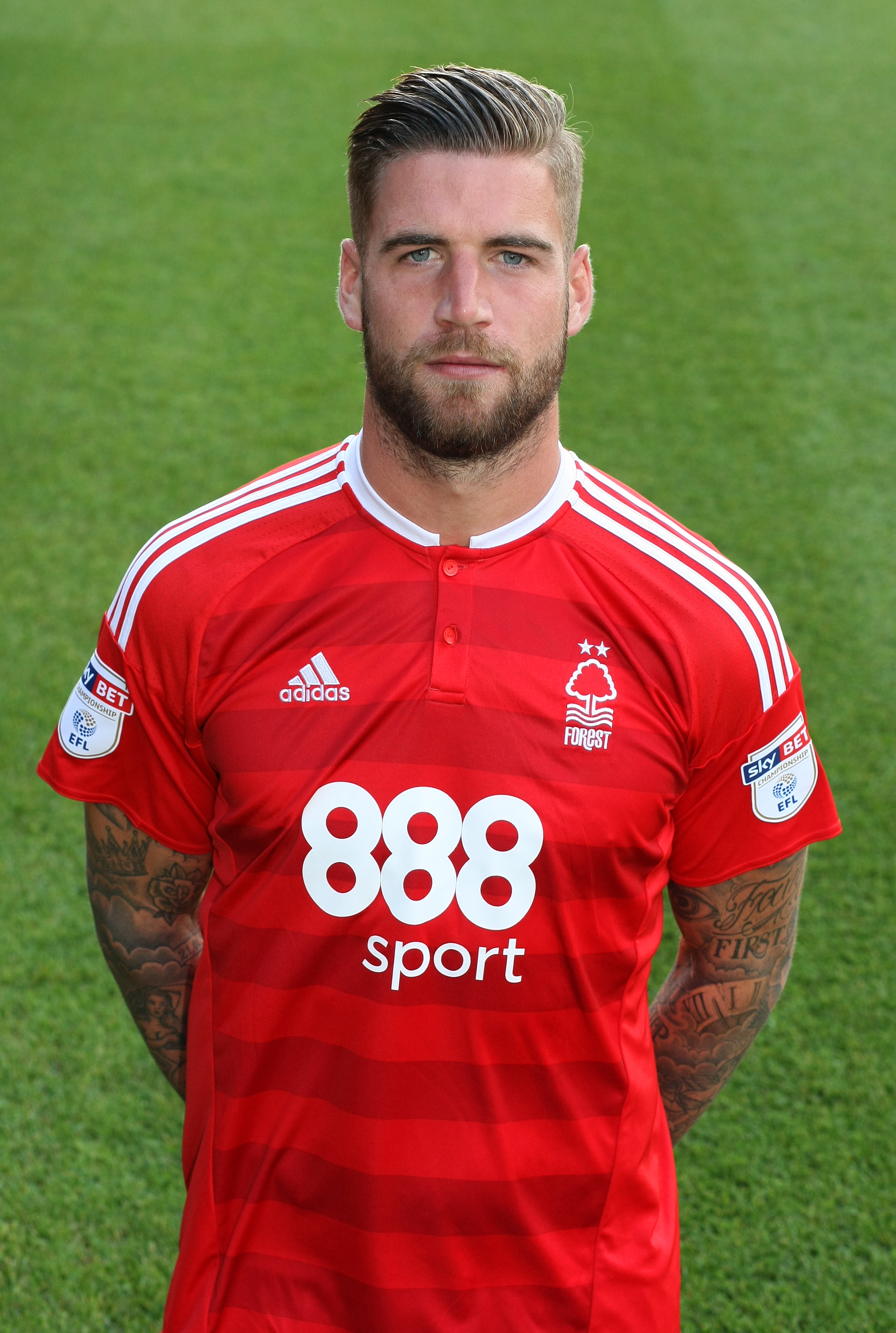
- Veldwijk with Nottingham Forest

Personal information
- Full name: Lars Veldwijk
- Date of birth: 21 August 1991 (age 35)
- Place of birth: Uithoorn, Netherlands
- Height: 1.96 m (6 ft 5 in)
- Position: Striker

Team information
- Current team: PSM Makassar
- Number: 7

Youth career
- SV Argon
- FC Volendam

Senior career*
Years	Team	Apps	(Gls)
2011	FC Volendam	2	(0)
2011–2013	Utrecht	5	(0)
2012–2013	→ Dordrecht (loan)	31	(14)
2013–2014	Excelsior	38	(30)
2014–2016	Nottingham Forest	12	(0)
2015–2016	→ PEC Zwolle (loan)	33	(14)
2016–2017	Kortrijk	9	(1)
2017	→ Aalesund (loan)	16	(5)
2017–2018	Groningen	18	(4)
2018–2020	Sparta Rotterdam	42	(27)
2020	Jeonbuk Hyundai Motors	10	(1)
2020–2023	Suwon FC	110	(40)
2024	Castellón	6	(0)
2024	BG Pathum United	0	(0)
2025	Gulf United	11	(12)
2025–2026	Dibba Al-Hisn		
2026	Emirates		
2026	Al-Nahda		
2026–	PSM Makassar	2	(0)

International career
2016–2019	South Africa	8	(0)
- * Club domestic league appearances and goals as of 11 October 2026

Lars Veldwijk (born 21 August 1991) is a professional soccer player who plays as a striker for Super League club PSM Makassar. Born in the Netherlands, he represented the South Africa national team.

== Club career ==
=== Excelsior ===
Veldwijk represented Eerste Divisie side Excelsior in the 2013–14 season, and scored 35 goals in 45 appearances across all competitions.

=== Nottingham Forest ===
On 12 June 2014, Veldwijk signed for Nottingham Forest from Excelsior for a fee of £500,000 that could rise to £1 million depending on various clauses. He made his debut on 16 August 2014 against Bolton Wanderers at the Macron Stadium as a 92nd-minute substitute for fellow striker Matty Fryatt. Veldwijk made his first start for Forest on 26 August 2014 in a 2–0 win against Huddersfield Town in the second round of the League Cup.

=== Loan to PEC Zwolle ===
Veldwijk went on loan to PEC Zwolle for the 2015–16 season, during which time he scored 14 goals in 33 league appearances. Upon his return to Forest he scored his first and only goal for the club in a 2–1 EFL Cup win against Millwall on 23 August 2016.

=== KV Kortrijk ===
In the middle of 2016, Veldwijk joined Belgian side KV Kortrijk and only made 9 appearances and scored just 1 goal for the club, he would go on loan to Aalesund in Norway.

=== Loan to Aalesunds FK ===
On 31 March 2017, Veldwijk joined Norwegian club Aalesunds FK on a season long loan due to the extended January transfer window in Norway with an option to buy, he would go on to impress in the Eliteserien by being involved in 8 goals in 16 appearances.

=== FC Groningen ===
Veldwijk joined Dutch side FC Groningen from Kortrijk and started well in his first season back in Dutch football since 2016 but got into trouble when he refused to come on as a late substitute in an Eredivisie league match against ADO Den Haag which led to the club and the player parting ways.

=== Sparta Rotterdam ===
On 16 June 2018, despite interest from clubs in the Eredivisie, as well from foreign clubs like reigning Scottish Premiership champions Celtic F.C, clubs in Russia, Belgium and Bulgarian side CSKA Sofia Veldwijk signed for then Eerste Divisie side Sparta Rotterdam on a free transfer and in his first season with the club he almost single-handedly promoted them back into the Eredivisie for the following season while being involved in 27 goals, scoring 24 goals and providing 3 assists, his highest goal contribution to date, it attracted top Dutch clubs and even won him a return to the national team after 2 years away from Bafana Bafana

=== Jeonbuk Hyundai Motors ===
On 15 January 2020, having previously been in negotiations with an unnamed club in South Africa, as well as Eredivisie sides also showing interest in him. Veldwijk signed for South Korea's reigning K League 1 champions Jeonbuk Hyundai Motors. He made his official debut for the club in March, during a 2–2 AFC Champions League draw against Sydney FC, but had to wait until May to feature in the league for the first time after football was suspended in South Korea due to the COVID-19 pandemic. After recovering from a minor knee injury, he marked his K League 1 league debut with a 93rd-minute winner against Busan IPark, before making his first start two weeks later.

=== Suwon FC ===
On 17 July 2020, Veldwijk dropped down a division to join K League 2 side Suwon FC on a permanent deal. He signed with Suwon FC for a contract that runs out until 31 December 2022.

During the 2021 K League 1 season he managed to score 18 goals in 32 appearances and having 6 assists, which made him the top goalscorer amongst South Africans anywhere in the world, which added confusion on why South Africa coach Hugo Broos didn't call him up for Bafana Bafana duty that season for the CAF qualifiers of the 2022 World Cup and then further snubbing him in the 2023 AFCON Qualifiers or for the 2023 Africa Cup Of Nations itself during that time despite being on form and worthy of a recall.

During a pre season friendly game for K-League Xl against English Premier League side Tottenham Hotspur, After coming from the bench Veldwijk scored the second equalizer early in the second half in an impressive performance as his side went on to lose 6–3 against Spurs.

On 30 September 2023, Suwon FC terminated contract with Veldwijk after being arrested by the police and having his driver's license revoked when he was driving drunk in South Korea, he leaves the club after scoring 40 goals in 110 appearances.

=== Castellón ===
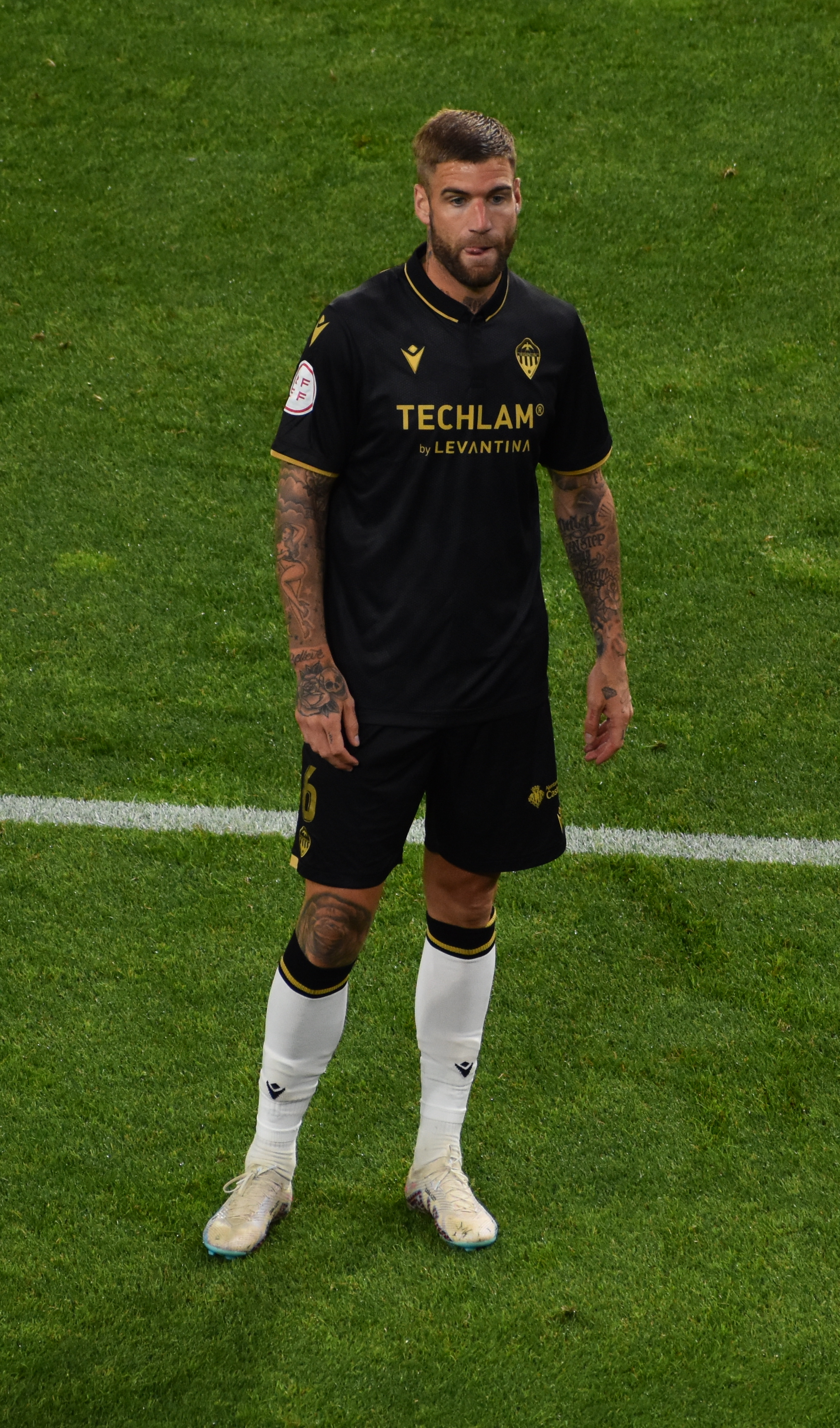
Veldwijk playing for Castellón in 2024

On 1 February 2024, After failing to join South African champions Mamelodi Sundowns over a mix of a break down of transfer talks and a division of the technical team over what he can offer to the team, Veldwijk opted to return to Europe and joined Spanish side CD Castellón who were campaigning in the third tier of Spanish football on a 6th month contract with an option to extend and apart from a few games, ended up missing the rest of the season through injury missing out on the team's promotion to the Spanish Second division but did play into two of their promotional play off games providing an assist in one of them and now he's preparing for the new season though his contract is ending on the 30th of June 2024.

=== BG Pathum United ===
After leaving Castellón and despite being linked with a return to FC Groningen and a move to Greek side Aris in the summer, Veldwijk opted to return to Asia joining Thailand side BG Pathum United but injuries made him sit out the first half of the season with the exception of a few games including the 4–0 victory over Borussia Dortmund where he got an assist, before he and the club agreed to terminate his contract making the 33 year old Veldwijk as of 1 January 2025 once again a Free agent. He is however looking to continue his playing career and is interested in joining either a Dutch club or a foreign club this transfer window.

=== Gulf United ===
Veldwijk despite being heavily linked with a return to his native Netherlands or at least Europe as a whole, postponed that return once again by joining UAE First Division League side Gulf United during the January transfer window, where he hit the ground running by scoring on debut in a 2–1 win over Majd and to date he seemed to have returned to his prolific best.

=== Dibba Al-Hisn ===
On 1 June 2025, Veldwijk joined side Dibba Al-Hisn.

== International career ==
Although born in the Netherlands, and having spent his formative years progressive through the Dutch youth system at club level, Veldwijk was eligible to represent South Africa through his paternal lineage. He received his maiden call for the nation's 2018 World Cup qualifier against Senegal in October 2016 before debuting in a 1–1 friendly tie with Mozambique the following month. After a spell away from the team, he then returned to the national fold to feature in his first international tournament in 2019, making five substitute appearances as South Africa reached the quarter-finals of the 2019 Africa Cup of Nations.

== Personal life ==
Veldwijk was in a relationship with television presenter and former vlogger Monica Geuze and they have a daughter together. Their daughter was born in July 2018. Geuze and Veldwijk split up in November 2019. He also has a son who was born in 2015 from a previous relationship.

== Career statistics ==
=== Club ===
As of match played on 14 May 2023

Club	Season	League			Cup		League Cup		Continental		Other		Total	
Club	Season	Division	Apps	Goals	Apps	Goals	Apps	Goals	Apps	Goals	Apps	Goals	Apps	Goals
FC Volendam	2010–11	Eerste Divisie	2	0	0	0	—		—		—		2	0
Utrecht	2011–12	Eredivisie	5	0	0	0	—		—		—		5	0
Utrecht	2012–13	Eredivisie	0	0	0	0	—		—		—		0	0
Utrecht	Total		5	0	0	0	0	0	0	0	0	0	0	0
Dordrecht (loan)	2012–13	Eerste Divisie	31	14	3	3	—		—		2 (Note: Appearances in the Eerste Divisie promotion play-offs)	2	36	19
Excelsior	2013–14	Eerste Divisie	38	30	3	1	—		—		4	4	45	35
Nottingham Forest	2014–15	Championship	11	0	1	0	2	0	—		—		14	0
Nottingham Forest	2015–16	Championship	0	0	0	0	0	0	—		—		0	0
Nottingham Forest	2016–17	Championship	1	0	0	0	2	1	—		—		3	1
Nottingham Forest	Total		12	0	1	0	4	1	0	0	0	0	17	1
PEC Zwolle (loan)	2015–16	Eredivisie	33	14	1	0	—		—		2 (Note: Appearances in the Eredivisie European place play-offs)	0	36	14
Kortrijk	2016–17	Belgian First Division A	9	1	2	0	—		—		0	0	11	1
Aalesund (loan)	2017	Eliteserien	16	5	3	2	—		—		—		19	7
Groningen	2017–18	Eredivisie	18	4	2	0	—		—		0	0	20	4
Sparta Rotterdam	2018–19	Eerste Divisie	36	24	1	0	—		—		4	0	41	24
Sparta Rotterdam	2019–20	Eredivisie	15	4	1	1	—		—		0	0	16	5
Sparta Rotterdam	Total		51	28	2	1	0	0	0	0	4	0	57	29
Jeonbuk Hyundai Motors	2020	K League 1	10	1	0	0	—		1 (Note: Appearances in the AFC Champions League)	0	—		11	1
Suwon FC	2020	K League 2	17	5	—		—		—		1 (Note: Appearances in the K League 2 promotion play-offs)	0	18	5
Suwon FC	2021	K League 1	37	18	0	0	—		—		—		37	18
Suwon FC	2022	K League 1	34	8	0	0	—		—		—		34	8
Suwon FC	2023	K League 1	22	9									22	9
Suwon FC	Total		110	40	0	0	0	0	0	0	1	0	111	40
Career total			335	137	17	7	4	1	1	0	13	6	370	165

=== International ===
As of matches played on 1 July 2019

National team	Year	Apps	Goals
South Africa	2016	1	0
South Africa	2019	7	0
Total		8	0

== Honours ==
Individual

- Eerste Divisie top scorer: 2013–14
- K League 1 Best XI: 2021
