= List of PEC Zwolle seasons =

PEC Zwolle was founded in 1910 and joined the Dutch Football League in 1956. The team played in the Eredivisie for the first time in 1978–79. The table details the club's achievements in all first team competitions, and records their top goalscorer, for each completed season.

== Key ==
Key to league record:

- P = Played
- W = Games won
- D = Games drawn
- L = Games lost
- F = Goals for
- A = Goals against
- Pts = Points
- Pos = Final position

Key to divisions:

- Div 2 = Tweede Divisie
- Div 1 = Eerste Divisie
- Ere = Eredivisie

Key to rounds:

- DNE = Did not enter
- Grp = Group stage
- R1 = Round 1
- R2 = Round 2
- R3 = Round 3
- R4 = Round 4
- R16 = Round of 16
- QF = Quarter-finals
- SF = Semi-finals
- RU = Runners-up
- W = Winners

Champions	Runners-up	Promoted	Relegated

Divisions in bold indicate a change in division.
Players in bold indicate the top scorer in the division that season.

== Seasons ==
Season	League									KNVB Cup	Johan Cruyff Shield	UEFA FIFA	Top goalscorer		Manager
Season	Division	P	W	D	L	F	A	Pts	Pos	KNVB Cup	Johan Cruyff Shield	UEFA FIFA	Name	Goals	Manager
1956–57	Div 2	28	10	3	15	61	83	23	10th	R1			(Netherlands) Jan Horst	13	(Netherlands) Jan van Asten
1957–58	Div 2	28	10	3	15	47	67	23	12th	R1			(Netherlands) Leo Koopman	13	(Netherlands) Jan de Roos (Netherlands) Piet Vogelzang
1958–59	Div 2	26	10	4	12	38	46	24	8th	R2			(Netherlands) Leo Koopman	17	(Netherlands) Herman Spijkerman
1959–60	Div 2	23	10	4	10	35	44	24	6th	No cup			(Netherlands) Leo Koopman	12	(Netherlands) Jan de Roos
1960–61	Div 2	34	10	5	19	54	83	25	16th	R2			(Netherlands) Leo Koopman	20	(Netherlands) Jan de Roos
1961–62	Div 2	28	9	5	14	45	64	23	14th	R2			(Netherlands) Leo Koopman	15	(Netherlands) Herman Spijkerman
1962–63	Div 2	32	7	2	23	40	87	16	17th	R2			(Netherlands) Hennie van Nee	15	(Netherlands) Herman Spijkerman
1963–64	Div 2	30	8	8	14	54	60	24	14th	R1			(Netherlands) Leo Koopman	19	(Netherlands) Cor Sluyk
1964–65	Div 2	30	6	7	17	39	69	20	15th	R1			(Netherlands) Leo Koopman	11	(Netherlands) Cor Sluyk
1965–66	Div 2	28	11	6	11	40	35	28	7th	Grp			(Netherlands) Leo Koopman	11	(Netherlands) Wim Blokland
1966–67	Div 2	44	23	6	15	82	68	52	8th	DNE			(Netherlands) Joop Schuman	22	(Netherlands) Jan van Asten
1967–68	Div 2	38	12	10	16	57	68	34	14th	Grp			(Netherlands) Benny Carelsz (Socialist Federal Republic of Yugoslavia) Anton Vučkov	11	(Netherlands) Jan van Asten
1968–69	Div 2	34	8	5	21	47	82	21	18th	R1			(Netherlands) Henk Leusink	10	(Netherlands) Joep Brandes
1969–70	Div 2	32	15	9	8	57	38	39	5th	R1			(Netherlands) Lody Kragt	15	(Netherlands) Pim van de Meent
1970–71	Div 2	32	17	11	70	36	45	67	2nd ↑	R1			(Uruguay) Pepe Fernandez	18	(Hungary) Lászlo Zalai
1971–72	**Div 1**	40	17	9	14	58	56	43	7th	R1			(Netherlands) Henk Liotart	12	(Hungary) Lászlo Zalai
1972–73	Div 1	38	20	8	10	72	48	48	2nd	R3			(Netherlands) Herman Heskamp	25	(Hungary) Lászlo Zalai (Germany) Georg Keßler
1973–74	Div 1	38	14	12	12	55	46	43	7th	R2			(Netherlands) Herman Heskamp	20	(Germany) Georg Keßler
1974–75	Div 1	36	17	11	8	50	35	45	4th	R2			(Netherlands) **Herman Heskamp**	**21**	(Austria) Friedrich Donnenfeld
1975–76	Div 1	36	14	14	8	51	35	42	6th	SF			(Netherlands) Cees van Slooten	13	(Netherlands) Hans Alleman
1976–77	Div 1	36	21	12	3	63	26	54	2nd	RU			(Netherlands) Ronald Hendriks	14	(Netherlands) Hans Alleman
1977–78	Div 1	36	23	8	5	83	31	54	**1st** ↑	R1			(Netherlands) Ron Jans	16	(Germany) Fritz Korbach
1978–79	**Ere**	34	7	18	9	36	46	32	8th	R3			(Netherlands) Koko Hoekstra (Netherlands) Tjeerd van 't Land	7	(Germany) Fritz Korbach
1979–80	Ere	34	9	9	16	36	47	27	14th	R4			(Netherlands) Koko Hoekstra	9	(Germany) Fritz Korbach
1980–81	Ere	34	10	10	14	42	49	30	9th	QF			(Netherlands) Peter van der Hengst	13	(Germany) Fritz Korbach
1981–82	Ere	34	8	10	16	45	69	26	15th	QF			(Netherlands) Ron Jans	12	(Germany) Fritz Korbach
1982–83	Ere	34	10	7	17	40	58	27	13th	R2			(Netherlands) Rini van Roon	12	(Netherlands) Bas Paauwe (caretaker) (Netherlands) Rinus Israël (caretaker) (Netherlands) Corn Brom
1983–84	Ere	34	10	9	15	56	70	29	14th	R2			(Netherlands) Rini van Roon	20	(Netherlands) Cor Brom
1984–85	Ere	34	4	9	21	34	86	17	18th ↓	R2			(Morocco) Aziz Doufikar (Netherlands) Peter van der Hengst	7	(Netherlands) Co Adriaanse
1985–86	**Div 1**	36	21	9	6	71	31	51	2nd ↑	R3			(Netherlands) Foeke Booy	15	(Netherlands) Co Adriaanse
1986–87	**Ere**	34	10	11	13	61	57	31	11th	R2			(Netherlands) Foeke Booy	21	(Netherlands) Co Adriaanse
1987–88	Ere	34	10	9	15	40	64	29	13th	R2			(Netherlands) Peter van der Waart	11	(Netherlands) Co Adriaanse (Netherlands) Ben Hendriks (caretaker)
1988–89	Ere	34	8	9	17	48	70	25	16th ↓	R2			(Netherlands) Edwin van Ankeren (Netherlands) Peter van der Waart	9	(Netherlands) Theo Laseroms
1989–90	**Div 1**	36	9	14	13	34	36	32	15th	R2			(Netherlands) Richard Roelofsen	11	(Netherlands) Theo de Jong
1990–91	Div 1	38	8	14	16	71	54	69	16th	R2			(Netherlands) Marco Roelofsen	9	(Netherlands) Theo de Jong
1991–92	Div 1	38	9	13	16	44	64	31	17th	R2			(Netherlands) Gérard van der Nooij	10	(Netherlands) Theo de Jong
1992–93	Div 1	34	16	8	10	55	38	40	6th	QF			(Netherlands) Martin Reynders	11	(Netherlands) Ben Hendriks
1993–94	Div 1	34	15	8	11	51	53	38	8th	R2			(Netherlands) Remco Boere	13	(Netherlands) Ben Hendriks
1994–95	Div 1	34	10	8	16	36	59	28	14th	Grp			(Netherlands) Remco Boere (Netherlands) Henri van der Vegt	10	(Netherlands) Ben Hendriks
1995–96	Div 1	34	7	12	15	37	43	33	14th	R3			(Romania) Lucian Ilie	7	(Netherlands) Piet Schrijvers
1996–97	Div 1	34	15	10	9	52	40	55	5th	QF			(Netherlands) Jan Bruin	11	(Netherlands) Jan Everse
1997–98	Div 1	34	14	12	8	58	42	54	6th	Grp			(Netherlands) Jan Bruin	14	(Netherlands) Jan Everse (Netherlands) Dwight Lodeweges
1998–99	Div 1	34	15	9	10	57	42	54	5th	QF			(Netherlands) Arne Slot	18	(Netherlands) Dwight Lodeweges
1999–2000	Div 1	34	22	8	4	90	41	74	2nd	R2			(Netherlands) Dirk Jan Derksen	28	(Netherlands) Dwight Lodeweges
2000–01	Div 1	34	18	10	6	73	41	64	3rd	QF			(Netherlands) Richard Roelofsen	14	(Netherlands) Dwight Lodeweges
2001–02	Div 1	34	22	7	5	65	36	73	**1st** ↑	R3			(Netherlands) Arne Slot	12	(Netherlands) Paul Krabbe
2002–03	**Ere**	34	8	8	18	31	62	32	16th	R2			(Netherlands) Richard Roelofsen	8	(Netherlands) Peter Boeve
2003–04	Ere	34	5	11	18	27	67	26	18th ↓	R2			(Netherlands) Jasar Takak	8	(Netherlands) Peter Boeve (Netherlands) Gerard Nijkamp (caretaker) (Netherlands) Hennie Spijkerman
2004–05	**Div 1**	38	17	10	9	66	50	61	4th	R2			(Netherlands) Ruud Berger	13	(Netherlands) Hennie Spijkerman
2005–06	Div 1	38	15	9	14	57	52	54	12th	R2			(Netherlands) Santi Kolk	18	(Netherlands) Hennie Spijkerman (Netherlands) Harry Sinkgraven (caretaker)
2006–07	Div 1	38	14	11	13	66	51	53	9th	R2			(Netherlands) Anton Jongsma	14	(Netherlands) Jan Everse
2007–08	Div 1	38	18	13	7	70	42	67	4th	QF			(Portugal) Tozé	15	(Netherlands) Jan Everse
2008–09	Div 1	38	18	9	11	58	49	63	4th	R2			(Netherlands) Dave Huymans (Netherlands) Derk Boerrigter	8	(Netherlands) Jan Everse (Netherlands) Claus Boekweg (caretaker) (Netherlands) Marco Roelofsen (caretaker) (Netherlands) Jan Everse
2009–10	Div 1	36	19	8	9	59	37	65	4th	R2			(Netherlands) Eldridge Rojer	12	(Netherlands) Jan Everse (Netherlands) Claus Boekweg (caretaker) (Netherlands) Jaap Stam (caretaker) (Netherlands) Art Langeler
2010–11	Div 1	34	20	10	4	69	27	69*	2nd	R4			(Netherlands) Sjoerd Ars	28	(Netherlands) Art Langeler
2011–12	Div 1	34	22	6	6	68	34	72*	**1st** ↑	R3			(Netherlands) Nassir Maachi	18	(Netherlands) Art Langeler
2012–13	**Ere**	34	10	9	15	42	55	39	11th	SF			(Sweden) Denni Avdić (Netherlands) Fred Benson	8	(Netherlands) Art Langeler
2013–14	Ere	34	9	13	12	47	49	40	11th	W			(Netherlands) Guyon Fernandez	10	(Netherlands) Ron Jans
2014–15	Ere	34	16	5	13	59	43	53	6th	RU	W	Europa League – Play-off	(Czech Republic) Tomáš Necid (Netherlands) Stefan Nijland	11	(Netherlands) Ron Jans
2015–16	Ere	34	14	6	14	56	54	48	8th	R2			(Netherlands) Lars Veldwijk	14	(Netherlands) Ron Jans
2016–17	Ere	34	9	8	17	35	39	35	14th	R3			(Netherlands) Queensy Menig	9	(Netherlands) Ron Jans
2017–18	Ere	34	12	8	14	42	54	44	9th	QF			(Netherlands) Mustafa Saymak	11	(Netherlands) John van 't Schip
2018–19	Ere	34	11	6	17	44	57	39	13th	R3			(Netherlands) Vito van Crooy (Germany) Lennart Thy	9	(Netherlands) John van 't Schip (Netherlands) Jaap Stam (caretaker)
2019–20	Ere	26	7	5	14	37	55	26	15th	R2			(Iran) Reza Ghoochannejhad	7	(Netherlands) John Stegeman
2020–21	Ere	34	9	11	14	44	53	38	13th	R2			(Iran) Reza Ghoochannejhad	7	(Netherlands) John Stegeman
2021–22	Ere	34	7	6	21	26	52	27	18th ↓	R16			(Netherlands) Daishawn Redan	5	(Netherlands) Dick Schreuder
2022–23	**Div 1**	38	27	4	7	99	43	85	2nd ↑	R2			(Germany) **Lennart Thy**	23	(Netherlands) Dick Schreuder
2023–24	**Ere**	34	9	9	16	45	67	36	12th	R1			(Germany) Lennart Thy	13	(Netherlands) Johnny Jansen
2024–25	Ere	34	10	11	13	43	51	41	10th	R1			(Netherlands) Dylan Vente	13	(Netherlands) Johnny Jansen

== See also ==
- List of PEC Zwolle (women) seasons
