= Darryl Lachman =

Curaçaoan footballer (born 1989)

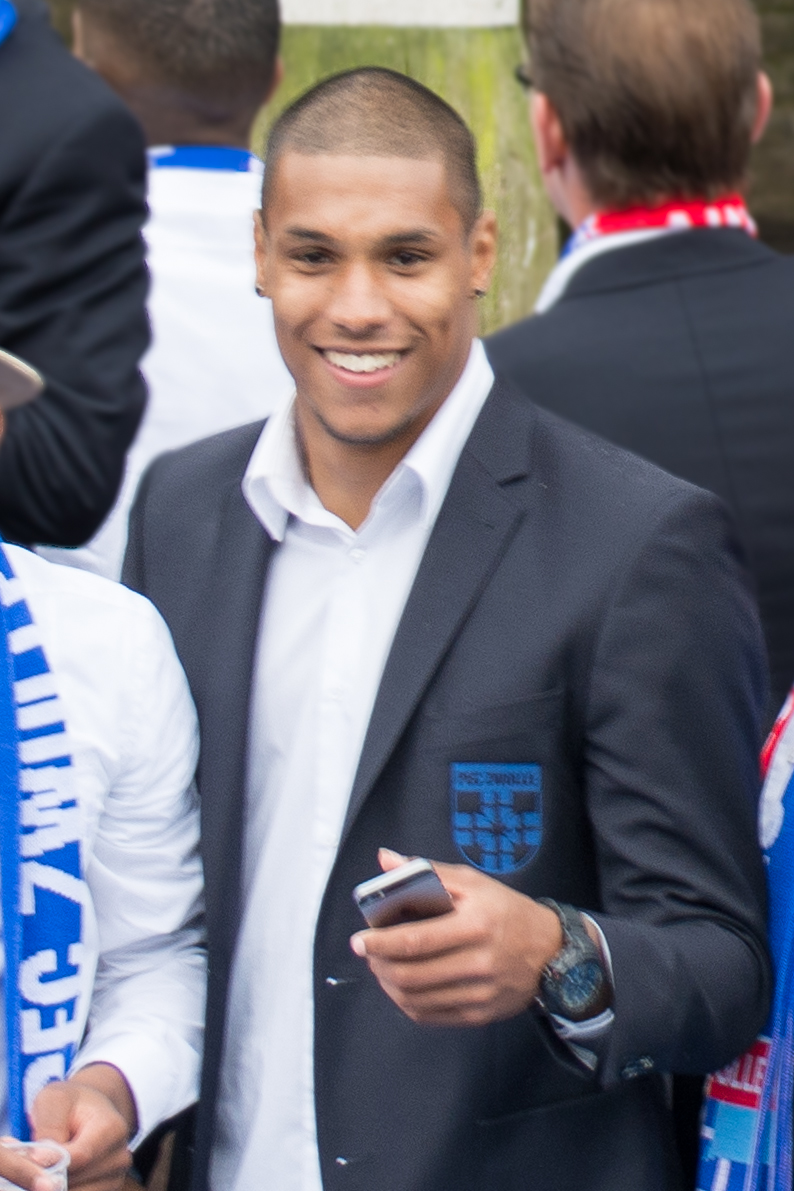
- Lachman in 2014

Personal information
- Full name: Darryl Brian Ricky Lachman
- Date of birth: 11 November 1989 (age 37)
- Place of birth: Amsterdam, Netherlands
- Height: 1.89 m (6 ft 2 in)
- Position: Centre-back

Youth career
- Ajax
- Groningen

Senior career*
Years	Team	Apps	(Gls)
2009–2011	Groningen	8	(0)
2011–2014	PEC Zwolle	91	(2)
2014–2015	Twente	15	(0)
2014	→ Jong Twente	3	(0)
2015–2016	Sheffield Wednesday	0	(0)
2016	→ SC Cambuur (loan)	15	(0)
2016–2018	Willem II	32	(1)
2018–2020	PEC Zwolle	33	(0)
2020	Hapoel Ra'anana	5	(0)
2020–2024	Perth Glory	98	(2)
2024–2025	Ajax Amateurs	7	(0)

International career
2015–2021	Curaçao	35	(1)
- * Club domestic league appearances and goals as of 11 January 2025

Darryl Brian Ricky Lachman (born 11 November 1989) is a professional footballer who plays as a centre-back. Born in the Netherlands, he represents the Curaçao national team.

He has formerly played for Groningen, PEC Zwolle, Twente, Sheffield Wednesday, SC Cambuur, Willem II, Hapoel Ra'anana & Perth Glory.

== Club career ==
=== FC Groningen ===
Born in Amsterdam, Netherlands, Lachman began his club career in the Netherlands with Hellas Sport and Ajax but he joined FC Groningen alongside Frank Olijve. Lachman progressed through the club's youth system for the rest of 2008 and early 2009. He quickly made an impact for Jong FC Groningen, scoring goals and was captain for the reserve side at one point. His performance attracted the attention of manager Ron Jans, who invited him to winter break training in Spain alongside four other youngsters. Towards the end of the 2008–09 season, he was called up to the first team twice as an unused substitute.

The start of the 2009–10 season saw Lachman continue to train with the first team, which eventually saw him earn a call–up amid an injury crisis for the first team. On 2 November 2009, he received a straight red card for a professional foul, as Jong FC Groningen won 2–1 against Jong Helmond Sport. After the match, Lachman served a two match suspension. He made his first team debut for FC Groningen, coming on as a second-half substitute, in a 4–2 win against Sparta Rotterdam on 13 December 2009. A week later on 23 December 2009, Lachman made his first start for the side, in a 2–0 loss against NEC Nijmegen in the last 16 of KNVB Cup. He was once again suspended for three match against Jong AZ Alkmaar after kicking Kolbeinn Sigþórsson, in a 1–1 draw on 28 January 2010. It wasn't until on 9 May 2010 when Lachman made another first team league appearance, losing 2–0 against FC Utrecht. At the end of the 2009–10 season, he made three appearances in all competitions.

In the 2010–11 season, Lachman was promoted to FC Groningen's first team, having signed a contract with the side. Despite being promoted to the first team, he continued to feature for Jong FC Groningen along the way. Lachman had to wait until on 3 October 2010 to make his first appearance of the 2010–11 season, where he started a match, in a 4–2 loss against FC Twente. However, his found his playing time, coming from the substitute bench and made two more starts for the club. He also faced his own injury concern, suffering ankle injury. At the end of the 2010–11 season, Lachman made six appearances in all competitions.

=== PEC Zwolle ===
On 21 April 2011, Lachman left FC Groningen to join Eerste Divisie side PEC Zwolle on a two–year contract.

He made his debut for the club, starting in the centre–back position, in a 2–2 draw against Den Bosch in the opening game of the season. Since joining PEC Zwolle, Lachman quickly established himself in the first team, playing in the centre–back position, his favourite position and felt that the club gave him a chance, something that FC Groningen didn't. Lachman helped PEC Zwolle keep four consecutive clean sheets between 4 November 2011 and 2 December 2011. For his performance, he signed a one-year contract with the club, keeping him until 2014. Lachman helped PEC Zwolle get promoted to Eredivisie after the club's promotion was confirmed on 13 April 2012. At the end of the 2011–12 season, he made thirty–six appearances in all competitions, having appeared in all the league match.

At the start of the 2012–13 season, Lachman scored his first goal for PEC Zwolle, in a 1–1 draw against FC Utrecht. He continued to regain his first team place in the centre–back position. Lachman helped the club earn their first home win in eight years at the Eredivisie by beating NAC Breda on 17 November 2012. He appeared in every league match since the start of the season until missing one match, due to a suspension. Lachman made his return from suspension, in a 1–1 draw against Heracles Almelo on 22 December 2012. He then scored his second goal of the season, in a 3–2 win against Feyenoord on 17 February 2013. At the end of the 2012–13 season, Lachman made thirty–five appearances and scoring two times in all competitions.

Having missed one match due to suspension in the opening game of the 2013–14 season, Lachman made his first appearance of the season, in a 3–1 win against Heracles Almelo on 10 August 2013. With his contract expiring at the end of the 2013–14 season, PEC Zwolle began a contract negotiations with the player. He then scored his first goal of the season, in a 4–0 win against Wilhelmina '08 on 30 October 2013. It was reported that the club's chances of keeping Lachman were slim, as there were interest from domestic and foreign clubs. However, he suffered a hamstring injury and was substituted in the 61st minute during a 4–1 win against Excelsior Rotterdam in the last sixteen of the KNVB Cup; this resulted in him out for a month. On 1 February 2014, Lachman made his return from injury, coming on as a second–half substitute, only for him to come off with ankle injury and substituted 22 minutes later, as PEC Zwolle won 3–1 against Roda JC Kerkrade. After the match, it was announced that he would be out for another month. On 16 March 2014, Lachman made his return from injury, coming on as a 77th-minute substitute, and set up the second goal of the game, in a 2–0 win against Go Ahead Eagles. Two weeks later on 30 March 2014, he captained the club for the first time, in a 1–1 draw against ADO Den Haag. In the KNVB Cup final, Lachman came on as a 71st-minute substitute and helped PEC Zwolle beat AFC Ajax 5–1 to secure their first KNVB Cup trophy. At the end of the 2013–14 season, Lachman went on to make twenty–nine appearances and scoring once in all competitions. He spent three seasons at the club which included promotion to the Eredivisie in his first season and a KNVB Cup triumph in his final season. By the time Lachman left PEC Zwolle, he made 91 appearances and scoring two goals for the club.

=== FC Twente ===
It was announced on 29 January 2014 that Lachman would be moving to Twente for next season on 1 July 2014. Upon joining the club, he hoped to getting used to his new club and couldn't wait to start soon enough.

Lachman made his FC Twente debut, starting a match, in a 1–1 draw against Cambuur in the opening game of the season. He then set up the club's second goal of the game, in a 2–1 win against Go Ahead Eagles on 13 September 2014. However, Lachman was dropped to the substitute bench by manager Alfred Schreuder, who demoted him to Jong FC Twente. On 1 November 2014, he made his return to the starting line–up and helped the club keep a clean sheet, in a 2–0 win against SC Heerenveen. Following this, Lachman regained his first team place, rotating between the starting eleven, playing in the centre–back and once playing in the right–back position, and the substitute bench. In a match against ADO Den Haag on 4 February 2015, he was at fault for conceding the two goals, including giving away a penalty, as FC Twente loss 2–0. Despite this, manager Schreuder reiterated that Lachman would continue to be in the first team. However, Schreuder dropped him out of the squad following his continuous poor performance, deteriorating their relationship further. A month later, he returned to the first team, but never played for the club for the rest of the season.

His time with FC Twente lasted just one season as, after making 15 league appearances, After leaving the club, Lachman doesn't regret joining FC Twente but he criticised Schreuder.

=== Sheffield Wednesday ===
Lachman left the Netherlands to join English Championship club Sheffield Wednesday. He failed to make a competitive appearance between July 2015 and January 2016 for Sheffield Wednesday.

He left Sheffield Wednesday in the summer 2017.

==== SC Cambuur (loan) ====
On 7 January 2016, Lachman returned to his homeland as he agreed to join Cambuur on loan for the rest of the season.

Lachman made his debut for the club, starting the match, in a 2–0 loss against Vitesse on 16 January 2016. Since joining SC Cambuur, he quickly became a first team regular, playing in the centre–back position, as the club found themselves in a relegation zone. However, SC Cambuur were relegated to Eerste Divisie after the club loss 6–2 against PSV Eindhoven on 1 May 2016. At the end of the 2015–16 season, Lachman made fifteen appearances in all competitions.

=== Willem II ===
On 19 August 2016, Lachman returned to his homeland, once again, as he joined Willem II on a season long loan deal.

Lachman made his debut for the club, starting the match, in a 2–1 win against Ajax in the opening game of the season. Since joining Willem II, he quickly established himself in the first team, playing in the centre–back position. Lachman then helped the club keep four consecutive clean sheets between 19 November 2016 and 10 December 2016. He then scored his first goal for the club, in a 3–2 win against Sparta Rotterdam on 27 January 2017. However, Lachman scored an own–goal, in a 2–1 loss against his former club, FC Twente on 4 March 2017. At the end of the 2016–17 season, he made thirty–three appearances in all competitions. Following this, Lachman joined Willem II permanently on a free transfer.

Lachman's first game after signing for the club on a permanent basis came in the opening game of the season, in a 2–1 loss against Excelsior. Since re–joining Willem II, he continued to regain his first team place, playing in the centre–back position. However, Lachman played in every league match until he missed one match due to illness. But he made his return, in a 2–2 draw against Vitesse on 13 December 2017. However, Lachman received a straight red card in the 27th minute after fouling Mike van Duinen, in a 2–1 loss against Excelsior on 6 April 2018. After serving a one match suspension, he made his return to the starting line–up, in a 5–1 loss against Feyenoord on 18 April 2018. In a follow–up match against former club PEC Zwolle, Lachman captained the club after Freek Heerkens was substituted with an injury, as Willem II won 1–0 on 29 April 2018. At the end of the 2017–18 season, he went on to make thirty–seven appearances in all competitions.

On 31 March 2018, Lachman and Willem II failed to reach an agreement over a new contract. It was announced on 7 May 2018 that he would be leaving the club.

=== PEC Zwolle (second spell) ===
On 26 May 2018, Lachman re–joined PEC Zwolle on a free transfer, signing a two–year contract.

He made his second debut for the club, starting the match, in a 3–2 loss against SC Heerenveen in the opening game of the season. However, his second spell at PEC Zwolle wasn't impactful as the first; Lachman found himself in and out of the starting line–up. He was also subjected of criticism, due to constant mistakes, including a poor back pass that led to a goal against Fortuna Sittard on 4 November 2018. During a 3–2 loss against ADO Den Haag on 24 November 2018, Lachman was involved in a controversy when he reacted slowly after coming on as a substitute for Thomas Lam. After the match, manager John van 't Schip dropped him from the squad for the rest of the year. Following the sacking of van 't Schip, he was allowed to make a return to training. It wasn't until on 10 March 2019 when Lachman made his return to the starting line–up and kept a clean sheet, in a 0–0 draw against AZ Alkmaar. Following his return, he regained his first team place, playing in the centre–back position, for the rest of the season. At the end of the 2018–19 season, Lachman made twenty–two appearances in all competitions.

Ahead of the 2019–20 season, Lachman was told by the PEC Zwolle's management that he can leave the club, which never happened. As a result, Lachman was dropped out of the first team throughout August. Following this, he regained his first team place, playing in the centre–back position. In the January transfer window, PEC Zwolle was determined to sell Lachman.

=== Hapoel Ra'anana ===
On 5 February 2020, Lachman left PEC Zwolle for the second time to join Israeli side Hapoel Ra'anana.

Three days later on 8 February 2020, he made his debut for the club, starting the match, in a 2–1 loss against Maccabi Netanya. He made three more starts for Hapoel Ra'anana. However, the season was disrupted by the COVID-19 pandemic that pushed the season to June. Once the season resumed behind closed doors, Lachman made his first appearance, coming on as a late substitute, in a 1–0 loss against Hapoel Ironi Kiryat Shmona on 13 June 2020. At the end of the 2019–20 season, with the club relegated, Lachman made seven appearances in all competitions.

=== Perth Glory ===
On 23 October 2020, Lachman moved to A-League side Perth Glory on a two–year deal.

He made his debut for the club in the AFC Champions League match against Ulsan Hyundai, starting the match, in a 2–0 loss. His official league debut came on 20 January 2021 against Adelaide United FC, helping the side win 5–2. Since joining Perth Glory, Lachman quickly established himself in the first team, playing in the centre–back position. He then scored his first goal for the club, in a 2–1 win against Newcastle Jets on 27 March 2021. Lachman also dominated a number of stat categories for Perth Glory in the 2020–21 season, with the most passes attempted, tackles attempted, clearances, blocks and interceptions. At the end of the 2020–21 season, he made twenty–five appearances and scoring once in all competitions.

In the 2021–22 season, Lachman continued to retain his first team place in the centre–back position, forming a partnership with Jonathan Aspropotamitis. He played in every league match for Perth Glory, as the club had a poor season, finishing in 12th place. Despite this, Lachman was awarded Perth Glory's Most Glorious Players for the 2021–22 Season. At the end of the 2021–22 season, he went on to make twenty–six appearances in all competitions. Following this, Lachman signed a two–year contract with the club.

In the 2022–23 season, Lachman continued to retain his first team place in the centre–back position, forming a partnership with Mark Beevers. He then scored his second goal for Perth Glory, in a 2–1 win against Brisbane Roar on 10 January 2023. Lachman played in every league match until he was sent–off in the 60th minute for a foul on Mathew Leckie, in a 4–2 loss against Melbourne City on 11 February 2023. After serving a one match suspension, Lachman returned to the starting line–up against Brisbane Roar, only for him to be stretchered off after a head collision, as the club lost 2–1 on 26 February 2023. After missing one match, he made his return from injury and helped Perth Glory keep a clean sheet, in a 1–0 win against Western Sydney Wanderers on 10 March 2023. At the end of the 2022–23 season, Lachman made twenty–five appearances and scoring once in all competitions.

In the 2023–24 season, Lachman started in the first seven league matches of the season. However, he was dropped to the substitute bench for two matches by the end of the year. On 6 January 2024, Lachman made his return to the starting line–up, only for him to suffer a groin injury and substituted in the 58th minute, as Perth Glory loss 3–2 against Melbourne Victory. After missing one match, he returned to the starting line–up, in a 2–1 win against Western Sydney Wanderers on 20 January 2024. Following this, Lachman regained his first team place for the rest of the 2023–24 season. At the end of the 2023–24 season, with the club finishing twelfth place once again, Lachman made twenty–four appearances in all competitions.

On 28 May 2024, he was released by the club.

== International career ==
In November 2008, Lachman made two appearances for Netherlands national under-23 football team. Lachman was called up by the Netherlands U21 national team on two separate occasions, but did not make an appearance.

Lachman was eligible to play for Curaçao, India and Netherlands. In March 2015, he ultimately chose to play for Curaçao. Lachman made his debut for the Curaçao national team in a qualification match for the 2018 FIFA World Cup against Montserrat on 28 March 2015. Four days later on 1 April 2015, he scored his first goal for the national team, in a 2–2 draw against Montserrat. Lachman was called up to the Curaçao squad for the Caribbean Cup and helped the national team win the tournament by beating Jamaica 2–1.

In a friendly match against Bolivia on 24 March 2018, Lachman scored an own goal, as Curaçao drew 1–1. Five months later, he was called up to the national team squad for the CONCACAF Nations League qualifying. Lachman appeared four matches in the qualifying round that saw Curaçao earn a place in the 2019–20 CONCACAF Nations League.

In May 2019, Lachman was called up to the national team squad for the CONCACAF Gold Cup. He helped Curaçao progress to the knockout stage after helping the national team collect four points in the group stage, calling this achievement as "a boyhood dream".

Two years later, Lachman was called up to the Curaçao squad, playing both matches against Panama on 13 June 2021 and 16 June 2021, losing 2–1 and drawing 0–0 respectively.

== Personal life ==
Growing up, Lachman said he was "never been an easy boy", often sent out of class, little interest in learning and found it difficult to sit still. As a result, Lachman was sent to a special school. He later elaborated further, saying: "I used to be a difficult boy. Rebellious, always ready with a retort when the trainer said something to me."

Lachman has a daughter, who was born in Zwolle, which motivated him to re–join PEC Zwolle. Lachman has stated he is not passionate about football, saying, "I didn't feel the need to watch football." Lachman said he wanted to do coaching once his playing career is over.

== Career statistics ==
=== Club ===
As of match played 28 July 2023

Appearances and goals by club, season and competition
Club	Season	League			National cup (Note: Includes the KNVB Cup and FA Cup)		League cup (Note: Includes the Football League Cup)		Continental (Note: Includes the UEFA Europa League and AFC Champions League)		Total	
Club	Season	Division	Apps	Goals	Apps	Goals	Apps	Goals	Apps	Goals	Apps	Goals
Groningen	2009–10	Eredivisie	2	0	1	0	—		—		3	0
Groningen	2010–11	Eredivisie	6	0	0	0	—		—		6	0
Groningen	Total		8	0	1	0	—		—		9	0
PEC Zwolle	2011–12	Eerste Divisie	34	0	2	0	—		—		36	0
PEC Zwolle	2012–13	Eredivisie	33	2	5	0	—		—		38	2
PEC Zwolle	2013–14	Eredivisie	24	0	5	1	—		—		29	1
PEC Zwolle	Total		91	2	12	1	—		—		103	3
Twente	2014–15	Eredivisie	15	0	3	0	—		2	0	20	0
Jong Twente	2014–15	Eerste Divisie	3	0	—		—		—		3	0
Cambuur (loan)	2015–16	Eredivisie	15	0	0	0	—		—		15	0
Willem II	2016–17	Eredivisie	32	1	1	0	—		—		33	1
Willem II	2017–18	Eredivisie	32	0	5	0	—		—		37	0
Willem II	Total		64	1	6	0	—		—		70	1
PEC Zwolle	2018–19	Eredivisie	20	0	2	0	—		—		22	0
PEC Zwolle	2019–20	Eredivisie	13	0	2	0	—		—		15	0
PEC Zwolle	Total		33	0	4	0	—		—		37	0
Hapoel Ra'anana	2019–20	Israeli Premier League	5	0	1	0	—		—		6	0
Perth Glory	2020–21	A-League	25	1	—		—		3	0	28	1
Perth Glory	2021–22	A-League Men	26	0	—		—		—		26	0
Perth Glory	2022–23	A-League Men	24	1	1	0	—		—		25	1
Perth Glory	Total		75	2	1	0	—		3	0	79	2
Career total			309	5	28	1	0	0	5	0	342	6

=== International ===
Scores and results list Curaçao's goal tally first, score column indicates score after each Lachman goal.

No.	Date	Venue	Opponent	Score	Result	Competition	Ref.
1	1 April 2015	Blakes Estate Stadium, Look Out, Montserrat	Montserrat	1–0	2–2	2018 FIFA World Cup qualification	

== Honours ==
PEC Zwolle

- Eerste Divisie: 2011–12
- KNVB Cup: 2013–14

Curaçao

- Caribbean Cup: 2017
- King's Cup: 2019
