= Ryan Thomas (footballer) =

New Zealand footballer (born 1994)

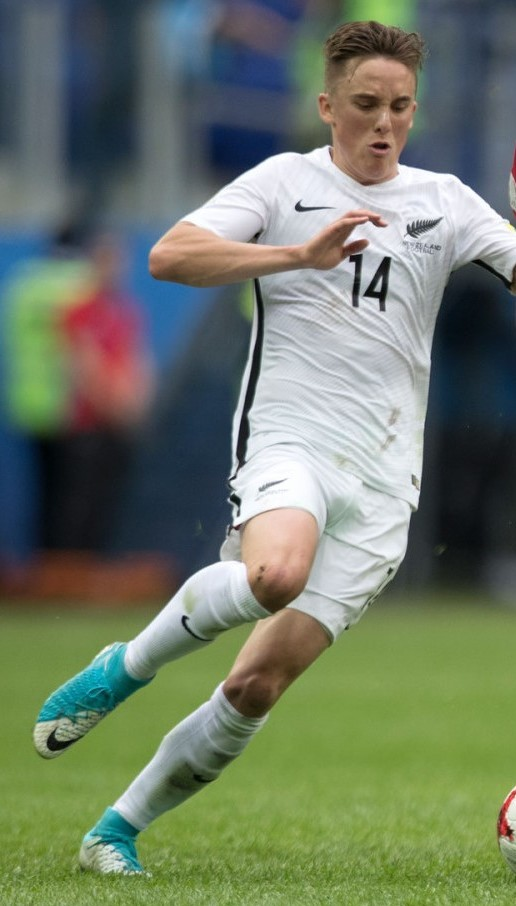
- Thomas playing for New Zealand at the 2017 FIFA Confederations Cup

Personal information
- Full name: Ryan Jared Thomas
- Date of birth: 20 December 1994 (age 31)
- Place of birth: Te Puke, New Zealand
- Height: 1.74 m (5 ft 9 in)
- Position: Midfielder

Team information
- Current team: PEC Zwolle
- Number: 30

Youth career
- Mount Maunganui Junior FC
- Tauranga City AFC
- Melville United
- Waikato FC

Senior career*
Years	Team	Apps	(Gls)
2011	Melville United		
2011–2013	Waikato FC	18	(4)
2013	Western Suburbs	11	(7)
2013–2018	PEC Zwolle	123	(8)
2018–2022	PSV	33	(4)
2022–	PEC Zwolle	69	(1)

International career^{‡}
2013	New Zealand U20	11	(2)
2014–	New Zealand	28	(3)
Medal record
Representing New Zealand
OFC U-20 Championship
Winner	2011 New Zealand
- * Club domestic league appearances and goals as of 21 May 2026 ‡ National team caps and goals as of 27 June 2026

Ryan Jared Thomas (born 20 December 1994) is a New Zealand professional footballer who plays as a midfielder for Eredivisie club PEC Zwolle and the New Zealand national team.

Thomas played for various clubs across the Waikato region of New Zealand, before signing professional terms with Eredivisie club PEC Zwolle in 2013. Since then, Thomas has spent his footballing career in the Netherlands, signing for reigning champions PSV Eindhoven in 2018.

== Club career ==
=== New Zealand ===
Thomas was born in Te Puke, New Zealand, attended Tauranga Boys' College and played his youth football at Mount Maunganui Tauranga City AFC and Waikato club Melville United in the NRFL Premier. He made his debut off the bench on 30 July 2011, alongside fellow current professional Jesse Edge, and scored in the 3–1 win against Forrest Hill Milford.

Thomas was announced as part of the squad for New Zealand Football Championship side Waikato FC at the beginning of the 2011–12 season, joining other future New Zealand international Tyler Boyd.

Thomas was later convinced by his previous Waikato FC manager, Declan Edge, to leave his current side to join the Olé Football Academy in Wellington, along with several other Waikato players. During this time, Thomas played for the Olé Academy-affiliated club Western Suburbs. Noting Thomas' exceptional talent, Edge organised a trial for the 18-year-old at Eredivisie club PEC Zwolle.

=== PEC Zwolle ===
Following a successful trial period in the Netherlands, Thomas signed for PEC Zwolle in September 2013, and made his debut for the club on 30 October 2013 against amateur side Wilhelmina '08 in the third round of the KNVB Cup, scoring the first goal in a 4–0 win. He quickly became a key winger for the club; his successful debut season culminated in winning the KNVB Cup, with Thomas scoring two goals in the final in a 5–1 win over AFC Ajax.

Thomas continued to impress for PEC Zwolle in the following seasons following his transition to a holding midfielder, with his rise being compared to that of Dutch legend Arjen Robben by former manager Ron Jans. In a 2017 interview, Jans stated that "it would not surprise me if he ended up at Real Madrid".

=== PSV ===
On 10 August 2018, Thomas joined reigning Eredivisie champions PSV for an undisclosed fee on a three-year contract. The move was described by former New Zealand and Eredivisie footballer Ivan Vicelich as one of the biggest deals ever by a New Zealander. Just days after signing, however, Thomas sustained a knee injury in training; originally thought to be only a minor sprain, it was later discovered to be a serious anterior cruciate ligament tear, meaning Thomas spent the rest of the season sidelined. As part of his rehabilitation, Thomas spent time working with Olympic swimming champion Pieter van den Hoogenband.

On 6 October 2019, after 14 months out injured, Thomas finally made his debut for PSV as an 85th minute substitute for Érick Gutiérrez in a 4−1 win over VVV Venlo.

After four injury-riddled seasons, during which he had four surgeries on his knee in total, Thomas was released by PSV in June 2022.

=== Return to PEC Zwolle ===
On 26 October 2022, Dutch side PEC Zwolle now playing in the Eerste Divisie announced that they had re-signed Thomas. In August 2024, it was announced that PEC Zwolle had extended Thomas’s contract until mid-2025.

== Career statistics ==
=== Club ===
As of match played 23 August 2024

Appearances and goals by club, season and competition
Club	Season	League			National Cup (Note: Includes KNVB Cup)		Europe		Other		Total	
Club	Season	Division	Apps	Goals	Apps	Goals	Apps	Goals	Apps	Goals	Apps	Goals
Waikato	2011–12	NZ Premiership	13	3	—		—		3 (Note: Appearance(s) in White Ribbon Cup)	2	16	5
Waikato	2012–13	NZ Premiership	5	1	—		—		—		5	1
Waikato	Total		18	4	—		—		3	2	21	6
PEC Zwolle	2013–14	Eredivisie	19	1	5	3	—		—		24	4
PEC Zwolle	2014–15	Eredivisie	30	3	5	1	2 (Note: Appearance(s) in UEFA Europa League)	0	1 (Note: Appearance(s) in Johan Cruyff Shield)	0	38	4
PEC Zwolle	2015–16	Eredivisie	12	2	0	0	—		—		12	2
PEC Zwolle	2016–17	Eredivisie	31	1	2	0	—		—		33	1
PEC Zwolle	2017–18	Eredivisie	31	1	3	0	—		—		34	1
PEC Zwolle	Total		123	8	15	4	2	0	1	0	141	12
PSV	2019–20	Eredivisie	11	2	1	0	3	0	—		15	2
PSV	2020–21	Eredivisie	16	1	2	0	6	0	—		24	1
PSV	2021–22	Eredivisie	6	1	0	0	3 (Note: One appearance in UEFA Champions League, two appearances in UEFA Europa League)	0	—		9	1
PSV	Total		33	4	3	0	12	0	—		48	4
PEC Zwolle	2022–23	Eerste Divisie	18	0	1	0	—		—		19	0
PEC Zwolle	2023–24	Eredivisie	7	0	0	0	—		—		7	0
PEC Zwolle	2024–25	Eredivisie	17	0	0	0	—		—		17	0
PEC Zwolle	2025–26	Eredivisie	27	1	1	0	—		—		28	1
PEC Zwolle	2026–27	Eredivisie	0	0	0	0	—		—		0	0
PEC Zwolle	Total		69	1	2	0	—		—		71	1
Career total			242	17	20	4	14	0	4	2	281	23

== International career ==
Thomas made his international debut for New Zealand when he played in a 2–4 friendly loss to Japan in March 2014. He scored his first international goals on 28 March 2017, netting a brace in a 2–0 win over Fiji.

On 14 May 2026, he was named in the 26-man squad for the 2026 FIFA World Cup.

=== International goals ===
Scores and results list New Zealand's goal tally first.

List of international goals scored by Ryan Thomas
No.	Date	Venue	Opponent	Score	Result	Competition
1.	28 March 2017	Wellington Regional Stadium, Wellington, New Zealand	Fiji	1–0	2–0	2018 FIFA World Cup qualification
2.	28 March 2017	Wellington Regional Stadium, Wellington, New Zealand	Fiji	2–0	2–0	2018 FIFA World Cup qualification
3.	1 September 2017	North Harbour Stadium, Auckland, New Zealand	Solomon Islands	4–1	6–1	2018 FIFA World Cup qualification

== Honours ==
=== Club ===
Waikato FC

- NZF Cup runner-up: 2011–12

PEC Zwolle

- KNVB Cup: 2014; runner-up 2015
- Johan Cruijff Shield: 2014
- Eerste Divisie; runner-up 2022–23 (promoted)

=== International ===
- OFC U-20 Championship: 2013

=== Individual ===
- Oceania Footballer of the Year, 2015
- IFFHS OFC Men's Team of the Decade 2011–2020
- IFFHS Oceania Men's Team of All Time: 2021
