= 2014 KNVB Cup final =

- Event: 2013–14 KNVB Cup
PEC Zwolle	Ajax
5	1
- Date: 20 April 2014
- Venue: De Kuip, Rotterdam
- Referee: Bas Nijhuis
- Attendance: 42,500

The 2014 KNVB Cup final was a football match between PEC Zwolle and Ajax on 20 April 2014 at De Kuip, Rotterdam. It was the final match of the 2013–14 KNVB Cup competition and the 96th Dutch Cup final. PEC Zwolle beat Ajax 5–1 to secure their first KNVB Cup trophy.

The match saw major crowd disturbance from Ajax fans, who were throwing fireworks on the pitch. This caused the referee to suspend the match in the fifth minute with Ajax a goal ahead. After a half-hour interval, play was resumed.

== Route to the final ==
PEC Zwolle		Round	Ajax	
Opponent	Result		Opponent	Result
Fortuna Sittard	2–0 (H)	Second round	FC Volendam	4–2 (a.e.t.) (H)
Wilhelmina '08	4–0 (H)	Third round	ASWH	4–1 (H)
Excelsior	4–1 (A)	Round of 16	IJsselmeervogels	3–0 (A)
JVC Cuijk	5–1 (H)	Quarter-finals	Feyenoord	3–1 (H)
NEC	2–1 (H)	Semi-finals	AZ	1–0 (A)

== Match ==
=== Details ===
20 April 2014
18:00 CEST

PEC Zwolle	5–1	Ajax
Thomas 8', 12'; Fernandez 22', 34'; Van Polen 50'	Report	Van Rhijn 3'

De Kuip, Rotterdam
Attendance: 42,500
Referee: Bas Nijhuis

PEC Zwolle	Ajax

GK	1	(Netherlands) Diederik Boer
RB	2	(Netherlands) Bram van Polen (c)	(yellow card) 24'
CB	4	(Netherlands) Maikel van der Werff
CB	14	(Netherlands) Joost Broerse		(substituted off) 71'
LB	5	(Netherlands) Bart van Hintum
CM	22	(South Africa) Kamohelo Mokotjo
CM	43	(Poland) Mateusz Klich
RW	6	(Netherlands) Mustafa Saymak		(substituted off) 64'
AM	11	(Netherlands) Jesper Drost
LW	30	(New Zealand) Ryan Thomas		(substituted off) 83'
CF	18	(Netherlands) Guyon Fernandez
Substitutes:
GK	16	(Belgium) Kevin Begois
DF	3	(Netherlands) Darryl Lachman		(substituted on) 71'
DF	38	(Netherlands) Giovanni Gravenbeek		(substituted on) 83'
MF	10	(Netherlands) Stef Nijland
FW	7	(Netherlands) Furdjel Narsingh		(substituted on) 64'
FW	8	(Greece) Thanasis Karagounis
FW	9	(Netherlands) Fred Benson
Manager:
(Netherlands) Ron Jans

GK	1	(Netherlands) Kenneth Vermeer
RB	2	(Netherlands) Ricardo van Rhijn
CB	4	(Finland) Niklas Moisander (c)		(substituted off) 54'
CB	24	(Netherlands) Stefano Denswil
LB	15	(Denmark) Nicolai Boilesen
CM	18	(Netherlands) Davy Klaassen
CM	17	(Netherlands) Daley Blind	(yellow card) 24'
CM	25	(South Africa) Thulani Serero
RW	20	(Denmark) Lasse Schöne		(substituted off) 80'
CF	11	(Spain) Bojan		(substituted off) 54'
LW	9	(Iceland) Kolbeinn Sigþórsson
Substitutes:
GK	22	(Netherlands) Jasper Cillessen
DF	6	(Netherlands) Mike van der Hoorn
DF	27	(Netherlands) Ruben Ligeon
MF	5	(Denmark) Christian Poulsen		(substituted on) 54'
MF	8	(Netherlands) Lerin Duarte
FW	34	(Netherlands) Lesly de Sa		(substituted on) 54'
FW	43	(Netherlands) Ricardo Kishna		(substituted on) 80'
Manager:
(Netherlands) Frank de Boer

Match rules

- 90 minutes.
- 30 minutes of extra-time if necessary.
- Penalty shoot-out if scores still level.
- Maximum of three substitutions.
