= Dick Schreuder =

Dutch football manager (born 1971)

Personal information
- Full name: Jan-Dirk Schreuder
- Date of birth: 2 August 1971 (age 55)
- Place of birth: Barneveld, Netherlands
- Position: Midfielder

Team information
- Current team: NEC (head coach)

Youth career
- Go Ahead Eagles

Senior career*
Years	Team	Apps	(Gls)
1989–1993	PSV Eindhoven	7	(0)
1993–1994	Sparta Rotterdam	14	(0)
1994–1995	Groningen	29	(4)
1995–1997	RKC Waalwijk	45	(2)
1997–1998	Stoke City	2	(0)
1998–1999	Helmond Sport	20	(1)
1999–2004	Go Ahead Eagles	63	(8)
Total		191	(15)

International career
1988–1989	Netherlands U18	7	(1)

Managerial career
- 2007–2013: SDV Barneveld
- 2014: Barnet
- 2014–2018: VV Katwijk
- 2021–2023: PEC Zwolle
- 2023–2025: Castellón
- 2025–: NEC
- * Club domestic league appearances and goals

Jan-Dirk "Dick" Schreuder (born 2 August 1971) is a Dutch professional football manager and former player who played as a midfielder. He is the head coach of Eredivisie club NEC.

Schreuder formerly played for PSV, Sparta Rotterdam, Groningen, RKC Waalwijk, Helmond Sport, Go Ahead Eagles in his native Netherlands and for Stoke City in England.

His brother Alfred was also a professional footballer.

== Playing career ==
Schreuder was born in Barneveld and began his career with PSV Eindhoven. He played four times for PSV.

He then played a season at Sparta Rotterdam and Groningen before finding regular football with RKC Waalwijk.

He left the Netherlands in the summer of 1997 on a bosman and signed for English side Stoke City. His move to English football did not got according to plan and he made just two appearances for Stoke, both coming as a substitute in the League Cup in the 1997–98 season.

He returned to Dutch football with Helmond Sport. He ended his professional career with Go Ahead Eagles.

== Coaching career ==
=== SDV Barneveld ===
Schreuder joined Dutch amateur club SDV Barneveld in 2007. He managed them to promotion in the 2012–13 season, forging a reputation for bringing young players through and playing attractive football.

=== Barnet ===
In June 2013, he joined Barnet as head of coaching, with the three most senior coaching positions at the club all being taken up by Dutchmen: Schreuder, Edgar Davids and Ulrich Landvreugd. After the departure of Davids in January 2014, Schreuder and Landvreugd were appointed joint managers. The duo lost their jobs to Martin Allen on 19 March after four straight losses, and returned to a first team coaching role.

=== VV Katwijk ===
Schreuder left Barnet to become manager of VV Katwijk in May 2014.

=== Philadelphia Union ===
In February 2018, he joined the technical staff of Philadelphia Union. and was replaced in Katwijk by Jack van den Berg.

=== TSG Hoffenheim ===
On 27 May 2019, Philadelphia Union announced, that Schreuder would leave the club at the end of the season to become assistant manager of TSG Hoffenheim for the 2019–20 season.

=== Vitesse ===
On 12 June 2021, it was announced that Schreuder would become an assistant coach to Thomas Letsch at Vitesse, where he signed a contract until 30 June 2023.

=== PEC Zwolle ===
On 18 November 2021, Schreuder signed a one-and-a-half-year deal to become the new PEC Zwolle head coach, replacing the outgoing Art Langeler.

=== CD Castellón ===
After leading PEC Zwolle back to the Eredivisie in the 2022–23 season with attacking football, he was appointed head coach of Primera Federación club Castellón in June 2023, replacing Albert Rudé.

In his first season in charge of the Spanish club, he led them back to Segunda División, achieving a Primera Federación record of 74 goals. On 20 January 2025, however, he was sacked.

=== NEC Nijmegen ===
On 1 July 2025, Schreuder was appointed head coach of NEC Nijmegen, replacing Rogier Meijer. He would start off the season managing NEC to a 5–0 home win over Excelsior Rotterdam in the Eredivisie. He led the club to a third-place finish in the 2025–26 season and participation in the Champions League qualifying rounds.

== Career statistics ==
Appearances and goals by club, season and competition
Club	Season	League			National cup		League cup		Total	
Club	Season	Division	Apps	Goals	Apps	Goals	Apps	Goals	Apps	Goals
PSV Eindhoven	1991–92	Eredivisie	4	0	1	0	—		5	0
PSV Eindhoven	1992–93	Eredivisie	3	0	1	0	—		4	0
Sparta Rotterdam	1993–94	Eredivisie	14	0	0	0	—		14	0
Groningen	1994–95	Eredivisie	29	4	0	0	—		29	4
RKC Waalwijk	1995–96	Eredivisie	24	1	0	0	—		24	1
RKC Waalwijk	1996–97	Eredivisie	21	1	0	0	—		21	1
Stoke City	1997–98	First Division	0	0	0	0	2	0	2	0
Helmond Sport	1998–99	Eerste Divisie	20	1	0	0	—		20	1
Go Ahead Eagles	1999–2000	Eerste Divisie	17	5	0	0	—		17	5
Go Ahead Eagles	2000–01	Eerste Divisie	15	0	0	0	—		15	0
Go Ahead Eagles	2001–02	Eerste Divisie	11	3	0	0	—		11	3
Career total			171	15	2	0	2	0	175	15

== Managerial statistics ==
As of 21 November 2026

Managerial record by team and tenure
Team	Nat	From	To	Record								Ref
Team	Nat	From	To	G	W	D	L	GF	GA	GD	Win %	Ref
Barnet	(England)	23 January 2014	19 March 2014	9	5	0	4	8	9	−1	55.56	
VV Katwijk	(Netherlands)	1 July 2014	30 January 2018	113	69	20	24	232	127	+105	61.06	
PEC Zwolle	(Netherlands)	18 November 2021	27 June 2023	64	35	9	20	125	78	+47	54.69	
Castellón	(Spain)	28 June 2023	20 January 2025	68	37	10	21	116	84	+32	54.41	
NEC	(Netherlands)	1 July 2025	Present	62	27	19	16	124	107	+17	43.55	
Total				307	168	58	81	597	396	+201	54.72	—

== Honours ==
=== Manager ===
Individual

- Eerste Divisie Manager of the Season: 2022–23
