= 2014 Johan Cruyff Shield =

Johan Cruijff Schaal XIX
| PEC Zwolle | Ajax |
| 1 | 0 |
- Date: 3 August 2014
- Venue: Amsterdam Arena, Amsterdam
- Referee: Danny Makkelie
- Attendance: 42,000
- Weather: Dry, 24°C

The 2014 Johan Cruyff Shield was the nineteenth edition of the Johan Cruyff Shield (Dutch: Johan Cruijff Schaal), an annual Dutch football match played between the winners of the previous season's Eredivisie and KNVB Cup. The match was contested by PEC Zwolle, the 2013–14 KNVB Cup winners, and Ajax, champions of the 2013–14 Eredivisie. It was held at the Amsterdam Arena on 3 August 2014. PEC Zwolle won the match 1–0.

Coincidentally, the match was a repeat of last season's KNVB Cup final, which PEC Zwolle emphatically won 5–1, despite conceding early and major crowd disturbance from Ajax fans in the crowd at De Kuip (home of Ajax' rivals Feyenoord).

== Background ==
The 2014 Johan Cruyff Shield was the first Dutch football game played in the 2014-15 season. The Johan Cruyff Shield has been played as the first Dutch football match every season since its inception in 1991.

PEC Zwolle made their way to this edition of the Johan Cruyff Shield by beating Ajax 5-1 in the 2014 KNVB Cup final. PEC Zwolle had a much easier path to the final, though, with their hardest opponent being NEC Nijmegen, who got relegated that season. Meanwhile, Ajax faced off against AZ Alkmaar and Feyenoord to get there.

Ajax got to the 2014 Johan Cruyff Shield by winning the Eredivisie 71 points. 2nd Place Feyenoord had 67 points, which made them 4 points off the title.

== Match ==
3 August 2014
18:00 CET

| PEC Zwolle | 1–0 | Ajax |
|---|---|---|
| Nijland 55' | Report |

Amsterdam Arena, Amsterdam
Attendance: 42,000
Referee: Danny Makkelie

| PEC Zwolle | Ajax |

| GK | 1 | (Netherlands) Diederik Boer |
| RB | 2 | (Netherlands) Bram van Polen (c) | (yellow card) 52' |
| CB | 15 | (Australia) Trent Sainsbury |
| CB | 14 | (Netherlands) Joost Broerse |
| LB | 5 | (Netherlands) Bart van Hintum | (yellow card) 83' |
| CM | 22 | (South Africa) Kamohelo Mokotjo |
| CM | 23 | (Netherlands) Ben Rienstra | (yellow card) 54' |
| RW | 6 | (Netherlands) Mustafa Saymak |
| AM | 11 | (Netherlands) Jesper Drost |
| LW | 30 | (New Zealand) Ryan Thomas | | (substituted off) 62' |
| CF | 10 | (Netherlands) Stef Nijland | | (substituted off) 68' |
Substitutes:
| GK | 25 | (Netherlands) Boy de Jong |
| DF | 28 | (Finland) Thomas Lam |
| DF | 24 | (Netherlands) Steven Pereira |
| MF | 19 | (Netherlands) Rick Dekker |
| FW | 17 | (North Macedonia) Denis Mahmudov |
| FW | 8 | (Greece) Thanasis Karagounis | | (substituted on) 62' |
| FW | 9 | (Greece) Nikolaos Ioannidis | | (substituted on) 68' |
Manager:
(Netherlands) Ron Jans

| GK | 1 | (Netherlands) Kenneth Vermeer |
| RB | 29 | (Netherlands) Ruben Ligeon |
| CB | 6 | (Netherlands) Mike van der Hoorn |
| CB | 4 | (Finland) Niklas Moisander (c) | (yellow card) 45+1' |
| LB | 5 | (Denmark) Nicolai Boilesen |
| DM | 26 | (Netherlands) Nick Viergever | | (substituted off) 39' |
| CM | 10 | (Netherlands) Davy Klaassen |
| CM | 16 | (Denmark) Lucas Andersen |
| RW | 20 | (Denmark) Lasse Schöne |
| CF | 19 | (Poland) Arkadiusz Milik | | (substituted off) 82' |
| LW | 11 | (Netherlands) Ricardo Kishna | | (substituted off) 59' |
Substitutes:
| GK | 31 | (Netherlands) Peter Leeuwenburgh |
| DF | 24 | (Netherlands) Stefano Denswil |
| DF | 23 | (Netherlands) Kenny Tete |
| MF | 25 | (South Africa) Thulani Serero | | (substituted on) 39' |
| MF | 8 | (Netherlands) Lerin Duarte |
| FW | 21 | (Netherlands) Anwar El Ghazi | | (substituted on) 59' |
| FW | 9 | (Iceland) Kolbeinn Sigþórsson | | (substituted on) 82' |
Manager:
(Netherlands) Frank de Boer
