= Jan Everse Sr =

Dutch footballer (1922–1974)

Jan Everse
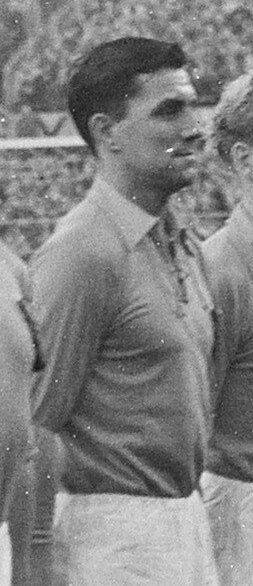
- Everse (1949)

Personal information
- Full name: Jan Everse
- Date of birth: 8 May 1922
- Place of birth: Rotterdam, Netherlands
- Date of death: 15 October 1974 (aged 52)
- Place of death: Netherlands
- Position: Defender

Youth career
- 1934-1940: HION

Senior career*
Years	Team	Apps	(Gls)
1946–1950	Neptunus		(14)
1951-1954	Xerxes	67	(6)
1954	BVC Rotterdam	11	(0)
1954–1956	Holland Sport	54	(3)
1956–1957	DFC	26	(8)
1957–1958	Emma	23	(0)

International career
1949	Netherlands	3	(0)
- * Club domestic league appearances and goals

Jan Everse (8 May 1922 – 15 October 1974) was a Dutch footballer who played as a defender.

== Club career ==
Everse played for hometown clubs HION, Neptunus, Xerxes and BVC Rotterdam as well as for Holland Sport, later called SHS, and DFC.

== International career ==
He was part of the Dutch squad for the 1948 Summer Olympics, but he did not play in any matches. Everse made his debut for the Netherlands in a June 1949 friendly match against Finland and earned a total of 3 caps, scoring no goals. His final international was a December 1949 friendly against Denmark.

== Personal life ==
Everse was a cousin of Feyenoord legend Coen Moulijn. His son Jan played professionally for Feyenoord and Ajax as well as 2 games for the Netherlands in the 1970s. They were the first father and son to play for the Oranje.
