= Art Langeler =

Dutch football manager (born 1970)

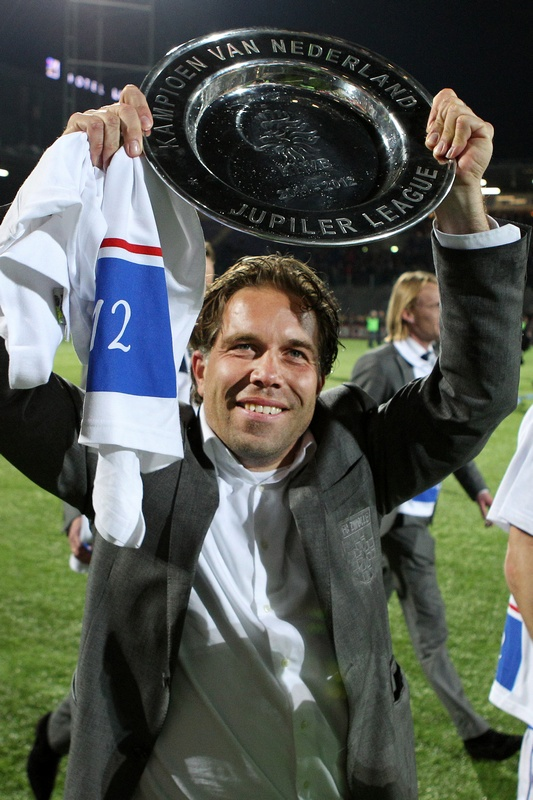
- Langeler in 2012

Personal information
- Full name: Art Langeler
- Date of birth: 16 August 1970 (age 56)
- Place of birth: Lochem, Netherlands

Team information
- Current team: Groningen (head youth development)

Youth career
- 1978–1988: SP Lochem
- 1988–1990: De Graafschap

Senior career*
Years	Team	Apps	(Gls)
1990–1992	De Graafschap	20	(1)

Managerial career
- 2001–2005: SV Colmschate '33
- 2005–2008: Rohda Raalte
- 2010–2013: PEC Zwolle
- 2013–2017: PSV (academy director)
- 2016–2018: Netherlands U21
- 2021: PEC Zwolle
- 2022: Curaçao
- 2022–: Groningen (youth)
- * Club domestic league appearances and goals

Art Langeler (born 16 August 1970) is a Dutch professional football manager and former player. He currently works as head of upper youth development for Groningen.

== Playing career ==
Langeler started playing football with SP Lochem. At U19 level, he moved to De Graafschap. After playing for a year in the U21 team, he signed a three-year professional contract in 1990. He was part of De Graafschap's first team from 1990 to 1992, and made 20 appearances for the first team. In 1992, he handed in his contract to take a degree in physical education at Windesheim University of Applied Sciences in Zwolle.

== Managerial career ==
=== Early years ===
After his training as a sports teacher, he combined a function of gym teacher with that of football coach. He quickly made a name for himself as a coach in amateur football with the Overijssel-based clubs SV Colmschate '33, who played in the Tweede Klasse, and Rohda Raalte, who played in the Sunday Hoofdklasse C. After the 2007–08 season, Rohda were relegated to the Eerste Klasse. At the start of the following season, Langeler had a falling out with Harry Pauw, the chairman of Rohda, who indicated that Langeler should have intervened in the relegation season. Langeler subsequently resigned, but after the board had expressed its confidence in him, he decided to finish the season with Rohda.

=== PEC Zwolle ===
In 2008, Langeler moved from Rohda Raalte to FC Zwolle, where he became responsible for the youth academy together with Hans van Dijkhuizen and also became a head coach of the U17 team. The following year he coached for the U13, a job that he combined with that of teaching at the Landstede sports and exercise education in Zwolle.

At the end of 2009, FC Zwolle announced that Langeler would succeed Jan Everse, who had been dismissed in October 2009, as head coach with effect from 1 January 2010. This led to criticism from opposing candidate for the job, Theo Vonk, who accused the club of using Langeler as a front man in order to allow Claus Boekweg and Jaap Stam, who temporarily observed the training sessions but did not have the correct diplomas, to continue their work. However, Langeler did not receive the highest trainer's diploma until 17 February 2010. In addition to Boekweg and Stam, Langeler had Sierd van der Berg in his team as the goalkeeper coach.

Zwolle performed above expectations his first half season in charge and finished in fourth place in the second-tier Eerste Divisie. In April 2010, Langeler's contract was extended by one year until the summer of 2011. In the following season, 2010–11, FC Zwolle played for the league title of the Eerste Divisie. Halfway through, in January 2011, Langeler extended his contract until the summer of 2013, and Stam and Boekweg also extended their contracts a few weeks later. Zwolle finished that season in second place in the Eerste Divisie and qualified for promotion play-offs. There, the team lost out on promotion to VVV-Venlo. The following season, FC Zwolle again played in the top of the Eerste Divisie. The Langeler-Stam-Boekweg triumvirate came to an end in March 2012, when Langeler decided to reshape the functions of the first team and to add Gert Peter de Gunst, who had until then been coach of the U17 to the staff. In this construction, Boekweg would be more distant from the first team. He could not agree with this and decided, against Langeler's wishes, to resign. Although Stam and Van der Berg also did not agree with the renewed division of tasks, they stayed on. That season, FC Zwolle won the Eerste Divisie title and won promotion to the Eredivisie, where they would play under their former name PEC Zwolle.

In his first season as head coach in the Eredivisie, PEC Zwolle entered the winter break in 14th position, with the same number of points as VVV-Venlo and Roda JC. On 3 January 2013, Langeler and Stam announced that they would not extend their expiring contracts at PEC Zwolle. Although they had made the decision separately from each other, they chose to announce it together. A few days after the announcement, PEC Zwolle managed to upset PSV by beating them 3–1. After Langeler announced that his departure, he was soon linked to various clubs, including Groningen and Cambuur. On 17 March 2013, Langeler announced that he had been asked to become head of youth development at PSV. He indicated that he was interested in the job, because of his interest in the policy side of football. PSV had been looking for a successor for Jelle Goes for some time, who had resigned in September 2012, and previously saw Wiljan Vloet and Adrie Koster drop out for the position. On 28 March 2013, it was announced that Langeler had agreed a four-year contract with PSV for the position of head of youth development.

=== PSV and KNVB ===
Langeler started his position as head of youth development at PSV Eindhoven on 1 July 2013. He also wrote a weekly column on the PSV website about, among other things, current themes in the youth academy, looking ahead on the matches of the weekend. From the 2016–17 season, Langeler started working closer to the first team to promote the flow of talents from the youth academy. For example, one day a week he joined the staff of the first team led by Phillip Cocu. PSV announced in November 2016 that Langeler would not renew his expiring contract, because he wanted to work full-time as a coach again. He was succeeded by Pascal Jansen.

In August 2016, Langeler started to combine his duties at PSV with a position as assistant coach of the Netherlands U20, alongside head coach Dwight Lodeweges. Four weeks later, however, he was given a new task within the Royal Dutch Football Association (KNVB). He succeeded Fred Grim, who became Danny Blind's assistant national coach, as coach of the Netherlands U21 team. Langeler was ultimately responsible for three matches for the team as interim coach. After he announced that he would leave PSV, he came to an agreement with technical manager Jelle Goes of the KNVB in February 2017 to become the permanent coach of the Netherlands U21. PSV gave Langeler the opportunity to combine the position with his role as head of youth development until July 2017.

In May 2018, he was appointed by the KNVB as the first Football Development Director. In this position he became responsible for the development of recreational sports, football development within the KNVB and youth football.

=== Return to PEC Zwolle ===
On 11 March 2021, Langeler signed a two-year contract to become the new head coach of PEC Zwolle, starting 1 July 2021, which marked his return to the club. He stepped down a few months after his appointment, on 16 November 2021, citing lacking perspectives to turn around the club, who were firmly bottom of the league.

=== Curaçao and Groningen ===
Langeler was appointed head coach of the Curaçao national football team on 15 April 2022, succeeding interim coach Patrick Kluivert. The appointment was made by the new technical director, Guus Hiddink. Starting 1 July 2022, he also served as Head of Upper Youth Football Development at FC Groningen's academy, signing a contract until 2025. On 2 August 2022, both Hiddink and Langeler left their roles with the Curaçao Football Federation, which opted for a new direction.

== Managerial statistics ==
As of match played 9 June 2022

Managerial record by team and tenure
Team	From	To	Record					Ref.
Team	From	To	P	W	D	L	Win %	Ref.
PEC Zwolle	1 January 2010	30 June 2013	132	68	29	35	51.5	
Netherlands U21	23 September 2016	31 March 2018	11	5	3	3	45.5	
PEC Zwolle	1 July 2021	16 November 2021	13	2	1	10	15.4	
Curaçao	1 May 2022	2 August 2022	3	1	0	2	33.3	
Total			159	76	33	50	47.8	

== Honours ==
PEC Zwolle

- Eerste Divisie: 2011–12
