= Thomas Lam =

Finnish footballer (born 1993)

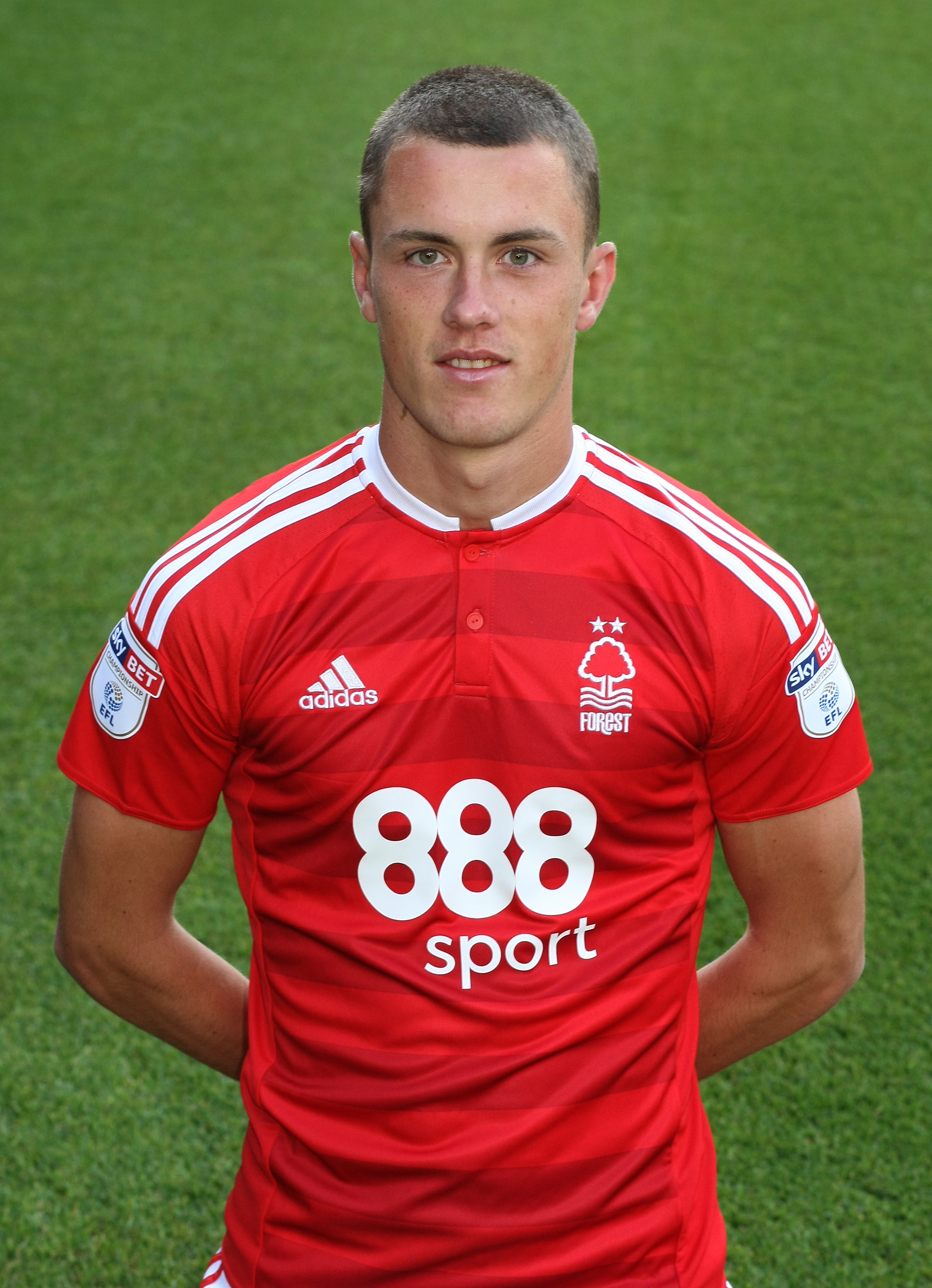
- Lam with Nottingham Forest in 2016

Personal information
- Full name: Thomas Anton Rudolph Lam
- Date of birth: 18 December 1993 (age 32)
- Place of birth: Amsterdam, Netherlands
- Height: 1.88 m (6 ft 2 in)
- Positions: Centre-back; defensive midfielder

Team information
- Current team: Bali United
- Number: 2

Youth career
- –2005: Amsterdamsche
- 2005–2012: AZ Alkmaar

Senior career*
Years	Team	Apps	(Gls)
2011–2014	AZ Alkmaar	6	(0)
2014–2016	PEC Zwolle	64	(4)
2016–2018	Nottingham Forest	19	(2)
2017–2018	→ Twente (loan)	28	(3)
2018–2021	PEC Zwolle	65	(7)
2021–2022	CSKA Sofia	22	(0)
2022–2023	Melbourne City	27	(1)
2023–2024	PEC Zwolle	31	(2)
2024–2026	Apollon Limassol	40	(1)
2026–	Bali United	0	(0)

International career
2009	Finland U16	5	(0)
2009–2010	Finland U17	9	(0)
2011	Finland U18	5	(1)
2011	Finland U19	3	(1)
2012–2014	Finland U21	10	(1)
2015–2022	Finland	28	(0)
Medal record
AZ Alkmaar
First place	KNVB Cup	2013
Second place	Johan Cruijff Shield	2013
PEC Zwolle
First place	Johan Cruijff Shield	2014
Second place	KNVB Cup	2015
- * Club domestic league appearances and goals as of 22 May 2026

Thomas Anton Rudolph Lam (born 18 December 1993) is a professional footballer who plays as a centre-back or defensive midfielder for Super League club Bali United. Born in the Netherlands, he represents the Finland national team. He began his senior club career playing for AZ Alkmaar, before signing with PEC Zwolle at age 20 in 2014.

Lam made his international debut for Finland in June 2015, at the age of 21 and has since had over 20 caps, including appearing in 2018 FIFA World Cup qualification and in Finland's UEFA Euro 2020 campaign in which Finland national team secured its first ever place in European Football Championship tournament's group stage.

== Club career ==
=== AZ Alkmaar ===
Lam, born and grew up in the Netherlands to a Finnish mother and a Dutch father, started his youth career at AFC before moving to AZ Alkmaar in 2005, where he progressed through the academy and started his senior career at AZ Alkmaar in 2011, where he signed his first professional contract. Shortly after, Lam was given number twenty–eight shirt for the new season. Though he made no appearances in the 2011–12 season, it was announced on 13 April 2012, Lam signed a contract with AZ, keeping him until 2016 and was named Finnish Tale's Promising Player of the Year. In the 2012–13 season, Lam suffered a setback when he suffered a thigh problems at the start of the season. It wasn't until on 16 September 2012 when Lam made his AZ debut, coming on as a substitute for Giliano Wijnaldum in the late substitute, in a 1–0 home win over Roda JC. Having appeared in most of the games in the season, Lam, received a straight red card in the 31st minute, in a 2–1 win over Heracles Almelo on 31 March 2013 and served a two match suspension as a result. Despite this, Lam went on to finish the season, making six appearances for the club. Although he did not feature in the squad, the club won the KNVB Cup after beating PSV Eindhoven 2–1 to win the tournament.

In the 2013–14 season, Lam was demoted back to the reserve side following the newly arrival of Dick Advocaat. Despite this, Lam scored his first AZ goal on 12 December 2013, in a Europa League against PAOK, in a 2–2 draw. This turned out to be his only appearance for the club this season. Lam went on to make six appearances in Eredivisie during his three years spell there.

=== Zwolle ===
On 24 July 2014, it was announced that Lam had signed a contract with PEC Zwolle, signing a long-term contract.

After appearing as an unused substitute in a 4–1 win over Ajax in the Johan Cruyff Shield. Lam made his PEC Zwolle debut on 16 August 2014, where he came on as substitute for Maikel van der Werff in the second half, in a 2–1 win over Dordrecht. It wasn't until on 29 October 2014 when Lam scored his first hat–trick of his career, in a 6–1 win over Hardenberg in the third round of the KNVB Cup. Lam then scored his first league goal of the season on 20 December 2014, in a 2–1 loss against Cambuur. Lam scored once again in the quarter-final of the KNVB Cup, in a 3–2 win over Cambuur, followed up by scoring in a 2–0 win over FC Utrecht several days later. Despite suffering from injury and suspension, as the 2014–15 season progressed, Lam went on to make thirty–four and scoring six times in all competitions. Lam played 81 minutes in the final of the KNVB Cup, which saw them unsuccessfully defend the title, in a 2–0 loss against Groningen.

In the 2015–16 season, Lam established himself in the first team regular in the centre–back position and scored his first goal of the season, in a 5–1 loss against Vitesse on 18 October 2015. Lam then scored his second goal of the season, in a 3–1 loss against Groningen on 30 January 2016. Despite missing one game, due to suspension, Lam finished his second season, making thirty–six appearances (33 league) and scoring two times in all competitions.

During Eredivisie seasons 2014–15 and 2015–16 he made a total of 64 appearances and scored 4 goals.

=== Nottingham Forest ===
Despite interests of returning to his former club, AZ, Lam was transferred from Zwolle to Nottingham Forest on 8 July 2016, on a free transfer. Upon joining the club, Lam was given the number twenty–eight shirt for the new season, the same number he wore at AZ Alkmaar.

In the opening game of the season, Lam scored on his Nottingham Forest debut in a 4–3 win over Burton Albion on 6 August 2016. After missing out two matches, Lam scored his second goal for the club on his return from the squad, in a 4–3 win over Wigan Athletic on 20 August 2016. After missing most of September, due to injury, Lam made return to the first team from injury, playing 45 minutes, in a 2–1 loss against Bristol City on 1 October 2016. Three weeks later, on 22 October 2016, Lam received a straight red card in the second half, in a 2–1 loss against Cardiff City. After serving a one match suspension, he made his return from suspension, in a 1–1 draw against Queens Park Rangers on 5 November 2016. However, towards the end of the season, Lam soon lost his first team place following the sacking of Philippe Montanier. at the end of the 2016–17 season, Lam went on to make a total of 21 appearances and scoring 2 times in all competitions.

=== FC Twente (loan) ===
However, ahead of the 2017–18 season, Lam was told by manager Mark Warburton that he was no longer part of his first team plan, which Lam described as "unfair and frustrating". Because of this, he hinted that he could be leaving the club. It was announced on 30 August 2017 that Lam signed on a season-long loan to Eredivisie side FC Twente.

Lam made his FC Twente debut, where he started and played for 87 minutes before being substituted, in a 1–0 loss against Sparta Rotterdam on 10 September 2017. In a follow-up match against FC Utrecht on 17 September 2017, Lam scored his first goal for the club, in a 4–0 win. He then scored again on 5 November 2017, in a 4–3 loss against PSV Eindhovem. Since making his debut for the club, Lam started in every match until he was suspended in early-December.

=== Return to Zwolle ===
On 29 August 2018 it was announced that Lam would return to Zwolle on a two-year contract. He made his debut on 2 September, playing the full 90 minutes of a 0–1 win at Groningen.

=== CSKA Sofia ===
On 16 August 2021 he signed for CSKA Sofia.

=== Melbourne City ===
On 16 August 2022, Lam signed a two-year deal with A-League Men side Melbourne City, making his debut for the club in the opening match of the 2022–23 A-League Men season against Western United. Lam scored his first goal for the club on 29 January 2023 against Adelaide United, with the match finishing 3–3. On 13 June 2023, Lam announced his departure from Melbourne City. He wanted to play closer to his family in The Netherlands, because he and his partner are expecting a second child.

=== Second return to Zwolle ===
On 25 July 2023, Lam signed a contract with PEC Zwolle until 2025. It was the second time Lam returned to Zwolle, after he had played there between 2014 and 2016, and again between 2018 and 2021.

=== Apollon Limassol ===
On 15 August 2024, Lam signed a two-year deal with Apollon Limassol in Cypriot First Division.

== International career ==
=== Finland youth teams ===
Despite being eligible for the Netherlands through his father, Lam opted to play for Finland through his mother. He has represented Finland in various junior national teams, starting off with Finland U17 and Finland U18 and Finland U19. It was not until in February 2012 when he was called up by Finland U21 for the first time. Lam made his Finland U21 debut on 13 October 2012, where he played for 45 minutes, against Estonia U21, which saw them win in the penalty–shootout

=== Finland first team ===
After being playing for the various junior national teams, Lam was finally called by the senior team in 2015. He then made his debut for the senior national team on 9 June 2015, in a 2–0 home defeat to Estonia. Lam soon got his first appearance in a UEFA Euro qualification match on 7 September 2015 when he played 84 minutes in a match against Faroe Islands. However, Finland did not qualify for the UEFA Euro 2016, as they finished fourth in the Group F in the qualification of the tournament. Since making his senior debut, Lam became a first team regular at the national team. He made his first appearance in FIFA World Cup qualifications in a match against Croatia on Tampere Stadium on 9 October 2016 when he replaced Alexander Ring on 67th minute.

Lam was called up for the UEFA Euro 2020 pre-tournament friendly match against Sweden on 29 May 2021. Lam was a member of the Finnish squad at the UEFA Euro 2020 tournament but remained as an unused substitute. Finland was placed 3rd in Group B following a 2–0 defeat to Belgium on 21 June 2021.

== Personal life ==
Lam was born in Amsterdam, Netherlands, to a Dutch father and a Finnish mother, through whom he gained Finnish citizenship. While he was growing up in the Netherlands, his parents owned a hotel.

He has a brother. In his late teens, Lam suffered a tragic loss when his father died of lung cancer in 2009.

== Career statistics ==
=== Club ===
As of 30 May 2025

Appearances and goals by club, season and competition
Club	Season	League			National cup (Note: Includes KNVB Cup, FA Cup, Bulgarian Cup, Australian Cup and Cypriot Cup)		League cup (Note: Includes EFL League Cup)		Continental		Total	
Club	Season	Division	Apps	Goals	Apps	Goals	Apps	Goals	Apps	Goals	Apps	Goals
AZ Alkmaar	2011–12	Eredivisie	0	0	0	0	—		0	0	0	0
AZ Alkmaar	2012–13	Eredivisie	6	0	2	0	—		—		8	0
AZ Alkmaar	2013–14	Eredivisie	0	0	0	0	—		1 (Note: Appearance in UEFA Europa League)	1	1	1
AZ Alkmaar	Total		6	0	2	0	—		1	1	9	1
PEC Zwolle	2014–15	Eredivisie	29	2	5	4	—		0	0	34	6
PEC Zwolle	2015–16	Eredivisie	35	2	1	0	—		—		36	2
PEC Zwolle	Total		64	4	6	4	—		0	0	70	8
Nottingham Forest	2016–17	Championship	19	2	1	0	1	0	—		21	2
Twente (loan)	2017–18	Eredivisie	28	3	2	0	—		—		30	3
PEC Zwolle	2018–19	Eredivisie	25	4	3	0	—		—		28	4
PEC Zwolle	2019–20	Eredivisie	14	0	2	0	—		—		17	0
PEC Zwolle	2020–21	Eredivisie	26	3	0	0	—		—		26	3
PEC Zwolle	Total		65	7	5	0	—		0	0	71	7
CSKA Sofia	2021–22	Bulgarian First League	22	0	5	0	—		7 (Note: Appearance(s) in UEFA Europa Conference League)	0	34	0
Melbourne City	2022–23	A-League	27	1	0	0	—		—		27	1
PEC Zwolle	2023–24	Eredivisie	31	2	0	0	—		—		31	2
Apollon Limassol	2024–25	Cypriot First Division	20	0	2	0	—		—		22	0
Career total			239	16	21	4	1	0	8	1	270	21

=== International ===
As of match played on 29 May 2021

Appearances and goals by national team and year
National team	Year	Competitive		Friendly		Total	
National team	Year	Apps	Goals	Apps	Goals	Apps	Goals
Finland	2015	1	0	1	0	2	0
Finland	2016	3	0	4	0	7	0
Finland	2017	4	0	3	0	7	0
Finland	2018	2	0	3	0	5	0
Finland	2019	1	0	0	0	1	0
Finland	2020	1	0	1	0	2	0
Finland	2021	0	0	2	0	2	0
Total		12	0	14	0	26	0

== Honours ==
AZ Alkmaar

- KNVB Cup: 2012–13

PEC Zwolle

- Johan Cruijff Shield: 2014

Melbourne City

- A-League Men Premiership: 2022–23

Individual

- Football Association of Finland Promising player of the year: 2011
