= Diederik Boer =

Dutch footballer (born 1980)

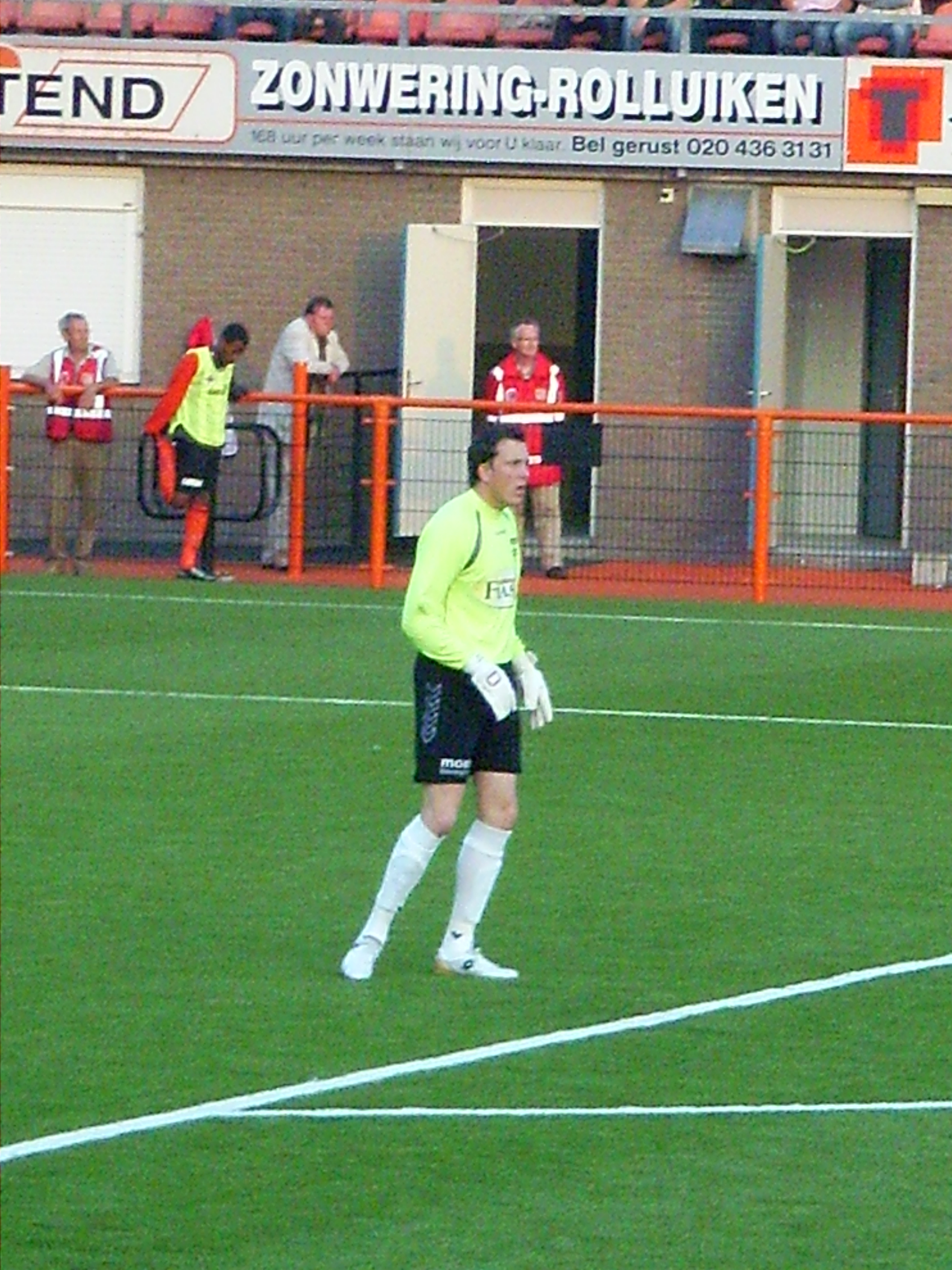
- Boer in 2007

Personal information
- Date of birth: 24 September 1980 (age 46)
- Place of birth: Emmeloord, Netherlands
- Height: 1.94 m (6 ft 4 in)
- Position: Goalkeeper

Youth career
- Flevo Boys

Senior career*
Years	Team	Apps	(Gls)
2001–2014	PEC Zwolle	293	(0)
2014–2017	Ajax	2	(0)
2017–2019	PEC Zwolle	33	(0)
Total		328	(0)
- * Club domestic league appearances and goals

Diederik Boer (born 24 September 1980) is a Dutch former professional footballer who played as a goalkeeper. He spent most of his career playing for PEC Zwolle in the Eredivisie. After retirement in 2019, he is now the goalkeeping coach for the PEC Zwolle youth teams.

== Career ==
Boer was born in Emmeloord, Netherlands. He made his professional debut on 8 March 2003, when FC Zwolle lost to Ajax 5–0. On 31 August 2014, he signed a three-year contract with Ajax to replace the departed Kenneth Vermeer as second keeper behind Jasper Cillessen. Boer is missing the little finger of his right hand.

== Honours ==
PEC Zwolle

- Eerste Divisie: 2001–02, 2011–12
- KNVB Cup: 2013–14
- Johan Cruyff Shield: 2014

Ajax

- UEFA Europa League: runner-up 2016–17
