= Jan Everse (footballer, born 1954) =

Dutch footballer and manager

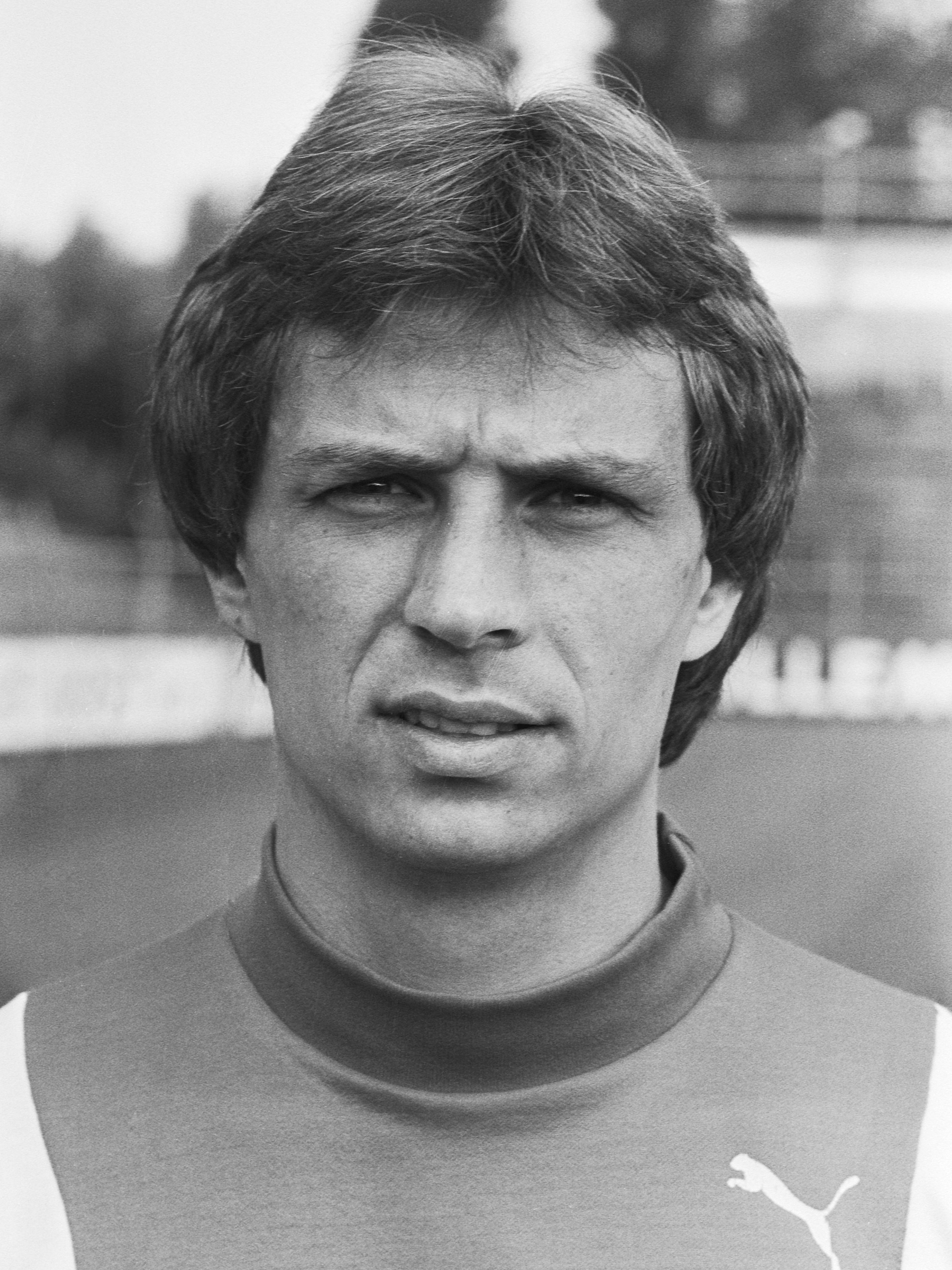
- Everse in 1978

Personal information
- Date of birth: 5 January 1954 (age 72)
- Place of birth: Rotterdam, Netherlands
- Position: Left back

Youth career
- Xerxes
- Feyenoord

Senior career*
Years	Team	Apps	(Gls)
1972–1977	Feyenoord	46	(2)
1977–1980	Ajax	69	(0)
Total		115	(2)

International career
1975	Netherlands	2	(0)

Managerial career
- 1980–1985: Swift Boys
- 1986–1988: Unitas'30
- 1988–1989: Hardinxveld
- 1990–1994: Kozakken Boys
- 1994–1995: DCV
- 1996–1998: Zwolle
- 1998–1999: Sparta
- 2001: Jokerit
- 2001–2003: Zwart-Wit '28
- 2004–2006: Excelsior Maassluis
- 2006–2009: Zwolle
- 2010: Heerenveen
- 2010–2011: Sparta
- 2011–2012: WHC
- 2015–2016: Dordrecht
- 2017–2019: BVCB
- * Club domestic league appearances and goals

Jan Everse (born 5 January 1954 in Rotterdam) is a Dutch retired football player and manager.

== Playing career ==
=== Club ===
Born in Rotterdam North, Everse played youth football at local club Xerxes. He made his professional debut for Feyenoord in a November 1973 Eredivisie match against Roda JC and also played for their arch rivals Ajax in the 1970s. In 1980 Everse was forced to retire from professional football due to a heavy injury, his final game was in December 1979 against Excelsior.

=== International ===
Everse made his debut for the Netherlands in an April 1975 friendly match against Belgium and he won his second and final cap in May that year against Yugoslavia.

== Managerial career ==
After his player career, he coached several amateur sides before taking charge of FC Zwolle in 1996. He then managed Sparta and Finnish outfit FC Jokerit, where he left after a row with the club's chairman. He then had spells at amateur sides Zwart-Wit '28 and Excelsior Maassluis before joining Zwolle for a second spell in 2006. He was given the sack in March 2009 after a highly publicized incident involving the son of a member of the club's board.

On 6 February 2010 SC Heerenveen officials hired Everse as their coach until June 2010, replacing Jan de Jonge. He coached Sparta for a second time during the 2010–2011 season, but left the club in February 2011 due to poor results. In 2015, he managed Dutch Eredivisie side FC Dordrecht, only to quit in March 2016 over a feud with technical director Marco Boogers. He was appointed head coach at BVCB Bergschenhoek in summer 2017. He was succeeded by Gerard van Ruitenburg in summer 2019.

== Personal life ==
Everse lives in Bergschenhoek. His father Jan Everse sr. played 3 games for Netherlands. They were the first father and son to play for the Oranje.
