= PEC Zwolle =

Dutch professional football club

- Full name: Prins Hendrik; Ende Desespereert Nimmer; Combinatie Zwolle
- Nickname: Blauwvingers (Bluefingers)
- Founded: 12 June 1910; 116 years ago
- Ground: MAC³PARK Stadion
- Capacity: 14,000
- Chairman: Frans van der Kolk
- Head coach: Alex Pastoor
- League: Eredivisie
- 2025–26: Eredivisie, 15th of 18
- Website: peczwolle.nl
| Home colours | Away colours |

Prins Hendrik Ende Desespereert Nimmer Combinatie Zwolle, commonly known as PEC Zwolle (Dutch: [ˈpɛk ˈsʋɔlə]) (Note: The name of the city of Zwolle, where the club is based, is pronounced [ˈzʋɔlə] in isolation.), is a Dutch professional football club based in Zwolle, Netherlands. They play in the Eredivisie, the top tier of Dutch football. They have played in the Eredivisie for a total of 22 seasons, reaching sixth place in 2015. They won the KNVB Cup in 2014 and also reached the final in 1928, 1977 and 2015.

This is the second incarnation of the club; its predecessor of the same name went bankrupt in 1990. The current club was founded immediately afterwards as FC Zwolle before renaming back to PEC Zwolle in 2012.

== History ==
=== Introduction ===
PEC was founded on 12 June 1910, the name being an abbreviation of PH EDN Combinatie (PH EDN Combination). The club was formed by a merger of Prins Hendrik (1 April 1906; Prince Henry) and Ende Desespereert Nimmer (1904; And Never Despair). PEC has been a professional football club since 23 February 1955. The club name was changed to PEC Zwolle in 1971 and to PEC Zwolle '82 in 1982. Instantly after the bankruptcy a new name was chosen for the new club: FC Zwolle. On 14 April 2012, after the promotion, the club name was changed back to PEC Zwolle.

=== PEC ===
PEC was one of Zwolle's three top football clubs, along with ZAC (founded in 1893) and Zwolsche Boys (1918). ZAC was associated with the local high society, Zwolsche Boys were associated with the working class, while PEC was the club of the local middle class. There was considerable rivalry between these three clubs, especially between Zwolsche Boys and PEC. Not only were their stadiums within walking distance from each other, the clubs frequently met each other in league matches.

=== PEC Zwolle ===
Despite this rivalry, PEC and Zwolsche Boys merged in 1969, taking the name PEC. In 1971, this became PEC Zwolle, in an attempt to promote the image of the city of Zwolle. In 1977, PEC Zwolle reached the finals of the KNVB Cup, losing to Twente in extra time, and missed out on promotion to the Eredivisie by one point. In 1978, the club won the Dutch first division title and was promoted to the Eredivisie for the first time in its history. In its first season in the Eredivisie, the club finished eighth, which remained PEC Zwolle's highest ever league position until finishing sixth in 2014–15. Their most impressive result that season was a 0–1 away victory at PSV. These results were achieved by a talented group of players bought from other clubs, such as Rinus Israël. The money for this came from the Slavenburg's bank, which was led by FC Zwolle chairman Jan Willem van der Wal. By 1982, the club had built up a debt of six million guilders and was on the verge of bankruptcy.

=== PEC Zwolle '82 ===
Real estate developer Marten Eibrink took over power in PEC Zwolle in 1982. He managed to end the debt and restructured the club, which was epitomized by a change in the name: PEC Zwolle '82. He also had the club's stadium renovated and decided to name the stadium's main stand the Johan Cruyff Stand, because Johan Cruyff had played his last official match against PEC Zwolle '82 on 13 May 1984. Eibrink brought legendary players like Piet Schrijvers, Johnny Rep and Cees van Kooten to the club. The club managed to revive, but the revival was short-lived. In 1985, PEC Zwolle '82 were relegated to the Dutch first division, largely due to an injury-ridden main squad. They managed to return after only one season, having finished in second place. That team was led by the coach Co Adriaanse and the player Foeke Booy. Eibrink, however, grew increasingly disappointed in sponsors and local authorities, accusing them of not loving the club in the way that he did, and he left the club in 1988. Despite a promising start to the 1988–89 season, the club finished in 16th place, which meant that it was relegated to the First Division. The financial crisis worsened, as sponsors refused to invest in the club any longer. The players' wages could not be paid, and a debt to the Slavenburg's bank appeared which had been overseen by the board for around ten years. This led to the club's bankruptcy in March 1990.

=== FC Zwolle ===
After the bankruptcy, it was decided that the club had to sever all ties with the troubled finances of the past and make a fresh start. The club got a new name (FC Zwolle), a new organisational structure, new sponsors, new club colours (blue-white shirts with white shorts instead of green-white shirts with black shorts) and a new crest. The first years of the 'new' club were hard, but after 1992–93, a new team filled with talents such as Jaap Stam (who would later play for PSV, Manchester United, Lazio, Milan and Ajax), Bert Konterman (Feyenoord and Rangers), Johan Hansma (Heerenveen) and Henri van der Vegt (Udinese) played attractive and successful football. In 1992–93, FC Zwolle narrowly missed promotion to the Eredivisie. In the KNVB Cup, FC Zwolle reached the quarter-finals, losing to Feyenoord in a penalty shootout.

After many failed attempts in the play-offs, FC Zwolle finally managed to secure a return to the Eredivisie by winning the First Division in 2002. In the 2002–03 Eredivisie season, the club finished in 16th place and escaped relegation via the play-offs. A year later, they made a miserable start to the season, and had scored only seven points halfway through the season. An impressive run, with victories over the likes of SC Heerenveen and AZ, proved in vain, as FC Zwolle dropped from a 16th place (which would have placed them in the play-offs) to the 18th place (direct relegation) on the last day of the season. They lost 7–1 away at Feyenoord, while their rivals Vitesse and Volendam managed to beat their opponents Utrecht and RBC Roosendaal.

At the beginning of the 2004–05 season, FC Zwolle was considered one of the favourites for the title in the First Division, along with Sparta Rotterdam. However, it was another club from the province of Overijssel, Heracles Almelo, that won the title. FC Zwolle finished the season in fourth place, and had to play play-off matches against the second- and sixth-placed teams of the First Division (Sparta and Helmond Sport) and the 17th-placed team of the Eredivisie, De Graafschap. They finished bottom of their group, with one point from six matches, while Sparta won the group and clinched promotion and De Graafschap was relegated.

The 2005–06 season started well, with FC Zwolle fighting for the league's top spot in the first months. However, the results dwindled in November and December. Angry supporters threatened trainer-coach Hennie Spijkerman after a 0–5 home defeat against Excelsior, and Spijkerman resigned a few days later. The club's chairman announced that he would crack down on the supporters involved, and said that some had already received stadium bans of up to 9 years. Spijkerman's assistant trainer Harry Sinkgraven finished the season, leading the club to the play-offs, in which Eredivisie side Willem II proved too strong.

Former Feyenoord and Ajax player Jan Everse, who had already trained the club between 1996 and 1999, was presented as the new trainer-coach. He was faced with financial problems at the club, and the departure of key striker Santi Kolk. Many players from the club's youth teams were brought into the main squad, with mixed results. The team ended at the ninth place of the table during the 2006–07 season.

During the 2010–11 season, FC Zwolle held the top spot for a long time, but had to leave the title to RKC Waalwijk. Zwolle ended in 2nd place and did not achieve promotion. The 2011–12 season was more successful. FC Zwolle won the title and secured their return to the Eredivisie in the 2012–13 season.

=== First trophies and European appearance ===
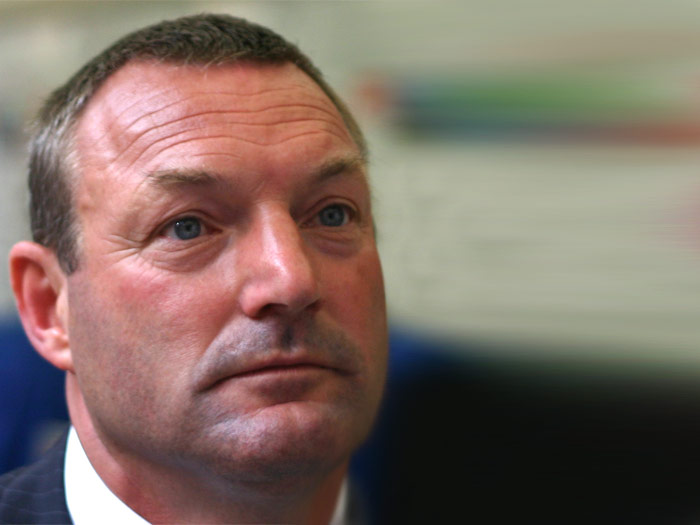
Ron Jans led PEC to a KNVB Cup and Johan Cruijf Schaal.

Shortly after winning the championship of the Eerste Divisie, the club announced that the name will be changed to PEC Zwolle again.

In 2014, under the guidance of new head coach Ron Jans, PEC Zwolle earned their first major silverware by winning the KNVB Cup, beating league champions Ajax 5–1 in the final. Thus, PEC Zwolle qualified for the UEFA Europa League for the first time. On 3 August 2014, PEC Zwolle also won the 2014 Johan Cruijff Schaal (Dutch Supercup) by defeating AFC Ajax, this time by 1–0.

By winning the KNVB Cup, PEC Zwolle qualified for the 2014–15 UEFA Europa League. In the play-off round, Zwolle played AC Sparta Prague and after a 1–1 draw in Zwolle it lost 3–1 in Prague, losing 2–4 on aggregate.

=== Time during the Eredivisie ===
After winning the KNVB Cup 2014, PEC Zwolle managed to reach the finals again in 2015. This time they played against FC Groningen and lost with 2 - 0.

The years following this, Zwolle was relatively stable. During the year 2017 with the new head coach John van 't Schip, PEC Zwolle experienced one of the most successful years ever, being third place during the winter break. However, following the winter break, Zwolle experienced the complete opposite of what it had before; it lost all matches and eventually ended at the 9th place in 2018. The season 2018/2019 Zwolle had a very disastrous start. During the winter break of 2018/2019, Zwolle was on struggling to stay in the Eredivise, being on the 15th place. Coach John van 't Schip was fired after this. During the year 2018, Zwolle got the fewest points in the Eredivisie; 26 points.

New coach Jaap Stam replaced his successor and managed to save Zwolle. He won with 3 - 1 against Feyenoord, 0 - 2 against Heracles Almelo, and 4 - 3 against FC Utrecht. At the end of the season 2018/2019, Zwolle ended at the 13th place, preventing relegation.

The 2 seasons following 2018/2019, PEC Zwolle repeatedly narrowly avoids relegation, ending at the 15th and 13th place. However, during the season 2021/2022, PEC Zwolle had a disastrous season once again. The coach Art Langeler quit and his assistant quit as well. This time, Dick Schreuder was enlisted as head coach to rescue Zwolle from relegation. Despite his initial successes, he failed to prevent relegation and Zwolle ended at the 18th place in 2022, being relegated to the second division in the Netherlands.

=== Short and record-breaking return to the Eerste Divisie ===
On 3 March 2023, Zwolle gained a 13–0 win over FC Den Bosch in a league game, as the team broke a broad series of records in the process. Firstly, the match became the largest win in the history of the Eerste Divisie, as well as the second largest one in the history of Dutch football (ex aequo with Ajax's 0–13 away win over VVV-Venlo in October 2020). Secondly, Zwolle became the first Dutch team since August 2002 (Heracles Almelo being the previous record-breaker) to close the first half of an official match with a 7–0 lead. In the same game, Zwolle player Apostolos Vellios scored three goals in almost twelve minutes since the starting kick-off, before netting another one later in the game: as a result, the Greek striker scored the fastest hat-trick in the history of the Dutch second tier. PEC player Lennart Thy claimed the top goalscorer's award in the Eerste Divisie for the season, having scored 23 goals in 36 appearances. Zwolle won immediate promotion back to the Eredivisie at the end of the season, finishing second in the league table.

== Stadiums ==
=== Oosterenkstadion ===
The old stadium was built in 1934 and demolished in 2007. It was located at Business park Oosterenk. Since the completion in 1934 two different clubs played in the stadium. PEC from 1934 till 1957, Zwolsche Boys from 1957 till 1970. Since 1970 PEC played its games at the Oosterenk Stadium. The stadium had to be demolished because the new stadium is located at the same spot as the Oosterenk Stadium is.

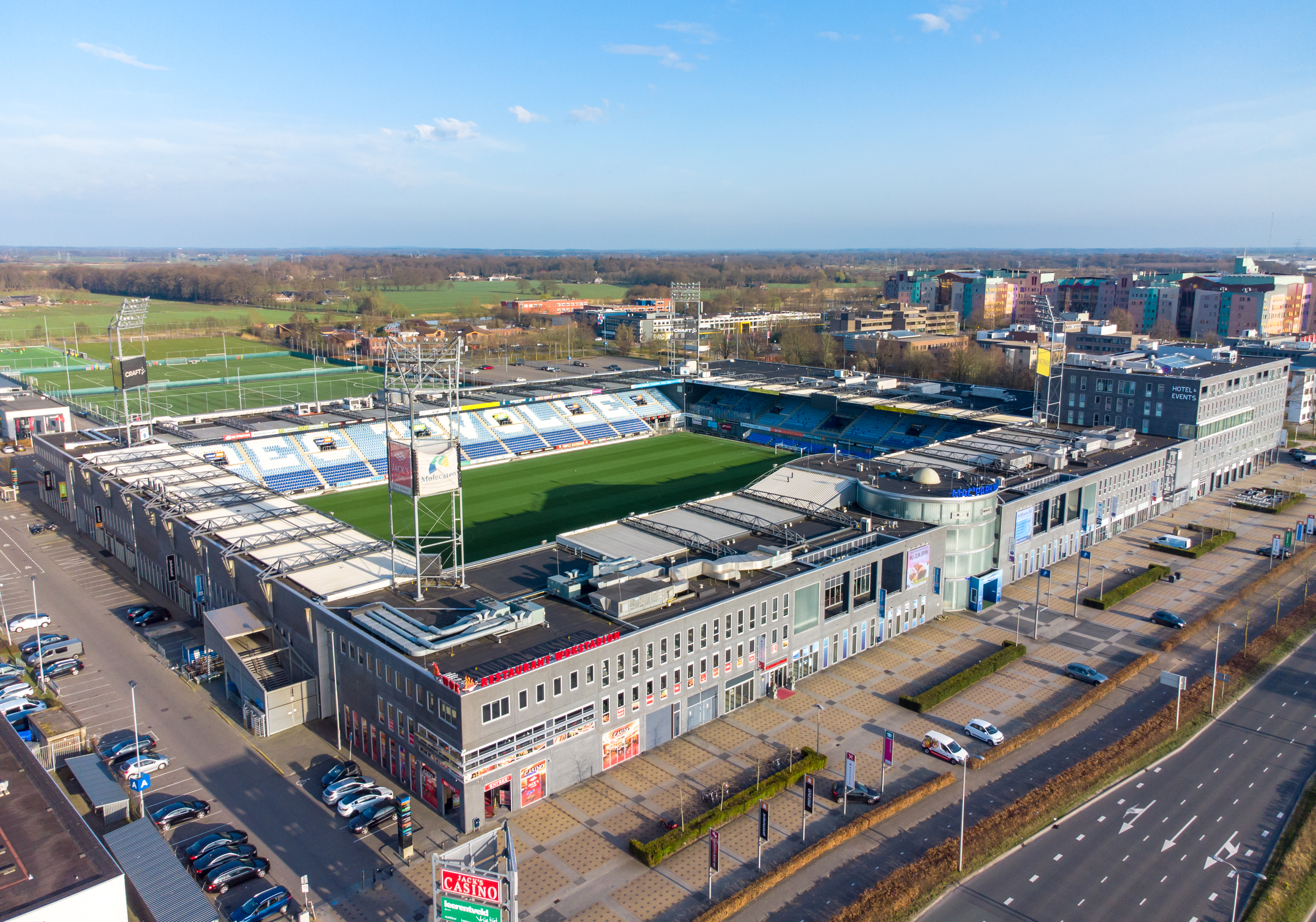
Mac3Park Stadion

=== PEC Zwolle Stadion ===
Officially since 29 August 2009, the stadium is no longer under construction. Construction started at 9 March 2007. The first game in the new stadium was against MVV. The final score was 0–0. The first goal scored in the new stadium was by FC Zwolle player Bram van Polen, coming on 22 August 2008 against Cambuur.

=== IJsseldelta Stadion ===
On 12 July 2012, the club officially announced the new name for their home ground, which is now called IJsseldelta Stadion.

=== MAC³PARK stadion ===
The name of the stadium was on 1 July 2016 changed to MAC³PARK stadion.

== Fans and Rivalries ==
PEC Zwolle's biggest rival is Go Ahead Eagles. Both clubs are located at the river IJssel, hence the name "IJsselderby".

PEC Zwolle also have good relations with Scottish Championship side Greenock Morton, with a contingent of fans making the trip to Scotland occasionally, as well as Greenock Morton also having a PEC Zwolle fans brick in their stadium Cappielow Park, and occasionally Greenock Morton fans attend at PEC Zwolle as well, with a flag with both club badges on it.

== Domestic results ==
Below is a table with FC Zwolle's domestic results since the introduction of professional football in 1956.

Domestic results since 1956
| Domestic league | League result | Qualification to | KNVB Cup season | Cup result |
|---|---|---|---|---|
| 2022–23 Eerste Divisie | 2nd | Eredivisie (promotion) | 2022–23 | Second round |
| 2021–22 Eredivisie | 18th | Eerste Divisie (relegation) | 2021–22 | Round of 16 |
| 2020–21 Eredivisie | 13th | – | 2020–21 | Second round |
| 2019–20 Eredivisie | 15th | – | 2019–20 | Second round |
| 2018–19 Eredivisie | 13th | – | 2018–19 | Round of 16 |
| 2017–18 Eredivisie | 9th | – | 2017–18 | Quarter final |
| 2016–17 Eredivisie | 14th | – | 2016–17 | Quarter final |
| 2015–16 Eredivisie | 8th | – | 2015–16 | Second round |
| 2014–15 Eredivisie | 6th | – (Losing EL play-offs) | 2014–15 | Final |
| 2013–14 Eredivisie | 11th | – | 2013–14 | Winners |
| 2012–13 Eredivisie | 11th | - | 2012–13 | Semi-finals |
| 2011–12 Eerste Divisie | 1st | Eredivisie (promotion) | 2011–12 | Third round |
| 2010–11 Eerste Divisie | 2nd | promotion/relegation play-offs: no promotion | 2010–11 | Fourth round |
| 2009–10 Eerste Divisie | 4th | promotion/relegation play-offs: no promotion | 2009–10 | Third round |
| 2008–09 Eerste Divisie | 4th | promotion/relegation play-offs: no promotion | 2008–09 | Second round |
| 2007–08 Eerste Divisie | 4th | promotion/relegation play-offs: no promotion | 2007–08 | Quarter finals |
| 2006–07 Eerste Divisie | 9th | promotion/relegation play-offs: no promotion | 2006–07 | Second round |
| 2005–06 Eerste Divisie | 12th | promotion/relegation play-offs: no promotion | 2005–06 | Second round |
| 2004–05 Eerste Divisie | 4th | promotion/relegation play-offs: no promotion | 2004–05 | Second round |
| 2003–04 Eredivisie | 18th | Eerste Divisie (relegation) | 2003–04 | Second round |
| 2002–03 Eredivisie | 16th | – (surviving promotion/relegation play-offs) | 2002–03 | Third round |
| 2001–02 Eerste Divisie | 1st | Eredivisie (promotion) | 2001–02 | Round of 16 |
| 2000–01 Eerste Divisie | 3rd | promotion/relegation play-offs: no promotion | 2000–01 | Quarter-finals |
| 1999–2000 Eerste Divisie | 2nd | promotion/relegation play-offs: no promotion | 1999–2000 | Third round |
| 1998–99 Eerste Divisie | 5th | promotion/relegation play-offs: no promotion | 1998–99 | Quarter-finals |
| 1997–98 Eerste Divisie | 6th | promotion/relegation play-offs: no promotion | 1997–98 | Group stage |
| 1996–97 Eerste Divisie | 5th | promotion/relegation play-offs: no promotion | 1996–97 | Quarter-finals |
| 1995–96 Eerste Divisie | 14th | – | 1995–96 | Round of 16 |
| 1994–95 Eerste Divisie | 14th | – | 1994–95 | group stage |
| 1993–94 Eerste Divisie | 8th | – | 1993–94 | Second round |
| 1992–93 Eerste Divisie | 6th | – | 1992–93 | Quarter-finals |
| 1991–92 Eerste Divisie | 17th | – | 1991–92 | Second round |
| 1990–91 Eerste Divisie (first season as FC Zwolle) | 16th | promotion/relegation play-offs: no promotion | 1990–91 | Second round |
| 1989–90 Eerste Divisie | 15th | – | 1989–90 | Second round |
| 1988–89 Eredivisie | 16th | Eerste Divisie (relegation) | 1988–89 | Second round |
| 1987–88 Eredivisie | 13th | – | 1987–88 | Second round |
| 1986–87 Eredivisie | 11th | – | 1986–87 | Second round |
| 1985–86 Eerste Divisie | 2nd | Eredivisie (promotion) | 1985–86 | Round of 16 |
| 1984–85 Eredivisie | 18th | Eerste Divisie (relegation) | 1984–85 | Second round |
| 1983–84 Eredivisie | 14th | – | 1983–84 | Second round |
| 1982–83 Eredivisie | 13th | – | 1982–83 | Second round |
| 1981–82 Eredivisie | 15th | – | 1981–82 | Quarter-finals |
| 1980–81 Eredivisie | 9th | – | 1980–81 | Quarter-finals |
| 1979–80 Eredivisie | 14th | – | 1979–80 | Quarter-finals |
| 1978–79 Eredivisie | 8th | – | 1978–79 | Round of 16 |
| 1977–78 Eerste Divisie | 1st | Eredivisie (promotion) | 1977–78 | First round |
| 1976–77 Eerste Divisie | 2nd | promotion competition: no promotion | 1976–77 | Final |
| 1975–76 Eerste Divisie | 6th | – | 1975–76 | Semi-finals |
| 1974–75 Eerste Divisie | 4th | promotion competition: no promotion | 1974–75 | Second round |
| 1973–74 Eerste Divisie | 7th | – | 1973–74 | Second round |
| 1972–73 Eerste Divisie | 2nd | promotion competition: no promotion | 1972–73 | Round of 16 |
| 1971–72 Eerste Divisie | 7th | – | 1971–72 | First round |
| 1970–71 Tweede Divisie | 2nd | Eerste Divisie (promotion) | 1970–71 | First round |
| 1969–70 Tweede Divisie | 5th | – | 1969–70 | First round |
| 1968–69 Tweede Divisie (as PEC and Zwolsche Boys) | 18th 4th | – Merged into PEC | 1968–69 | First round |
| 1967–68 Tweede Divisie (as PEC and Zwolsche Boys) | 14th 19th | – | 1967–68 | Group stage |
| 1966–67 Tweede Divisie (as PEC and Zwolsche Boys) | 8th 23rd | – | 1966–67 | did not participate |
| 1965–66 Tweede Divisie (as PEC and Zwolsche Boys) | 7th (group A); 15th (group A) | – | 1965–66 | group stage |
| 1964–65 Tweede Divisie (as PEC and Zwolsche Boys) | 15th (group A); 16th (group A) | – | 1964–65 | First round |
| 1963–64 Tweede Divisie (as PEC and Zwolsche Boys) | 14th (group A); 7th (group A) | – | 1963–64 | First round |
| 1962–63 Tweede Divisie (as PEC and Zwolsche Boys) | 17th (group B); 14th (group A) | – | 1962–63 | Second round |
| 1961–62 Tweede Divisie (as PEC and Zwolsche Boys) | 14th 12th | – | 1961–62 | ? |
| 1960–61 Tweede Divisie (as PEC and Zwolsche Boys) | 16th 13th | – | 1960–61 | ? |
| 1959–60 Tweede Divisie (as PEC and Zwolsche Boys) | 6th (group B); 12th (group B) | – survived relegation play-off | not held | not held |
| 1958–59 Tweede Divisie (as PEC and Zwolsche Boys) | 8th (group B); 7th (group B) | – | 1958–59 | ? |
| 1957–58 Tweede Divisie (as PEC and Zwolsche Boys) | 12th (group B); 14th (group B) | – | 1957–58 | ? |
| 1956–57 Tweede Divisie (as PEC and Zwolsche Boys) | 10th (group A); 11th (group A) | – | 1956–57 | ? |

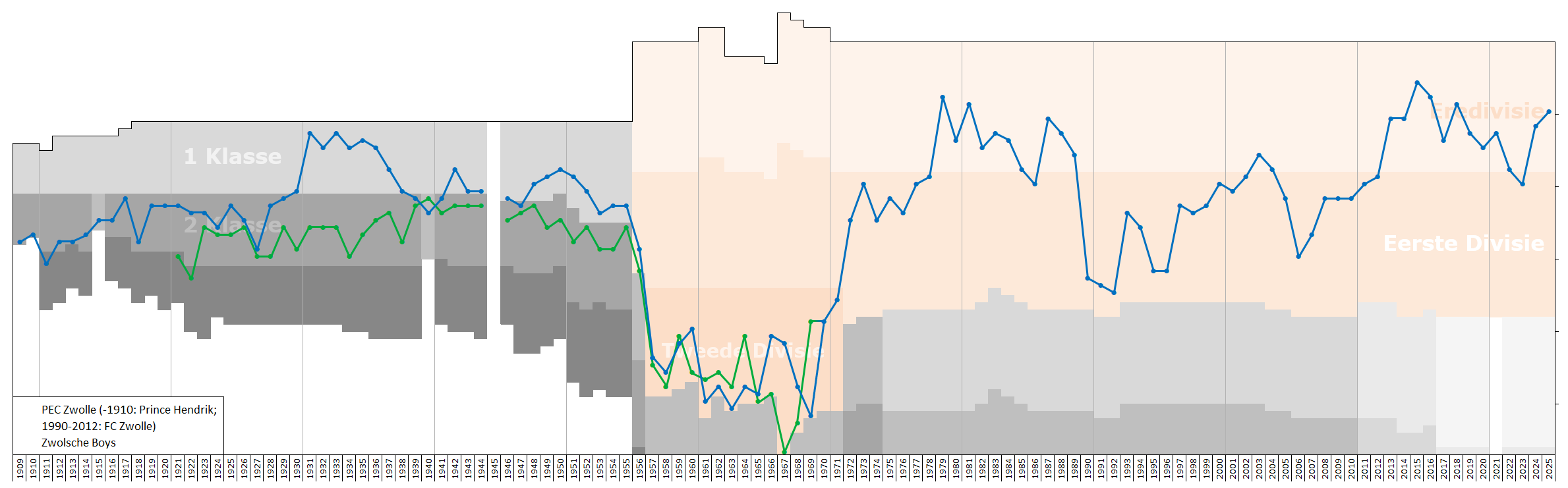
Historical chart of league performance

PEC Zwolle made it to the final round of the national cup four times. They only won in 2014. The first final was in 1928 against Racing Club Heemstede. The final score was 2–0. The second time they made it to the final was in 1977. The opponent that time was FC Twente. They lost 3–0 after extra time. The third time was in 2014, when they beat Ajax 5–1, subsequently claiming the cup for Zwolle for the first time in their history. The last time was in 2015 against FC Groningen. Final score 2–0.

== European record ==
| Season | Competition | Round | Club | Home | Away | Aggregate |
|---|---|---|---|---|---|---|
| 2014–15 | UEFA Europa League | PO | (Czech Republic) Sparta Prague | 1–1 | 1–3 | 2–4 |

== Honours ==
| Competition | Champion | | Runner-up | |
| Competition | Number | Seasons | Number | Season |
|---|---|---|---|---|
National
| Eerste Divisie | 3x | 1977–78, 2001–02, 2011–12 | 6x | 1972–73, 1976–77, 1985–86, 1999–00, 2010–11, 2022–23 |
| Tweede Divisie | – | – | 1x | 1970–71 |
| KNVB Cup | 1x | 2013–14 | 3x | 1927–28, 1976–77, 2014–15 |
| Johan Cruijff Shield | 1x | 2014 | – | – |

== Current squad ==
As of 14 September 2026

Note: Flags indicate national team as defined under FIFA eligibility rules; some limited exceptions apply. Players may hold more than one non-FIFA nationality.

| No. | Pos. | Nation | Player |
|---|---|---|---|
| 1 | GK | NED | Jasper Schendelaar |
| 2 | DF | CUW | Sherel Floranus |
| 3 | DF | NED | Olivier Aertssen |
| 4 | DF | NED | Tijs Velthuis |
| 6 | DF | GER | Jan Bürger |
| 7 | FW | DEN | Younes Namli |
| 8 | MF | DEN | Tobias Sommer |
| 9 | FW | DEN | Elias Sørensen |
| 10 | FW | NED | Koen Kostons |
| 11 | FW | BEL | Dylan Mbayo |
| 16 | GK | NED | Tom de Graaff |
| 17 | FW | NED | Sydney van Hooijdonk (on loan from Estrela da Amadora) |
| 18 | FW | NED | Odysseus Velanas |

| No. | Pos. | Nation | Player |
|---|---|---|---|
| 20 | MF | NED | Gabriël Reiziger |
| 22 | FW | GUI | Ibrahim Cissoko |
| 24 | DF | NED | Nick Viergever |
| 25 | MF | NED | Thijs Oosting |
| 26 | MF | NED | Jadiel Pereira da Gama |
| 28 | DF | DEN | Simon Graves |
| 30 | MF | NZL | Ryan Thomas (captain) |
| 33 | DF | NED | Damian van der Haar |
| 34 | MF | NED | Nick Fichtinger |
| 37 | MF | NED | Gilles van der Wal |
| 38 | MF | NED | Givaro Rahajaän |
| 41 | GK | NED | Duke Verduin |
| 50 | MF | BUL | Filip Krastev (on loan from Lommel) |

== Former players ==
=== National team players ===
The following players were called up to represent their national teams in international football and received caps during their tenure with PEC Zwolle:

- Australia
  - (Australia) Trent Sainsbury (2014–2016)
  Bulgaria
  - (Bulgaria) Filip Krastev (2024)
  Burkina Faso
  - (Burkina Faso) Rahim Ouédraogo (2001–2002)
  Cape Verde
  - (Cape Verde) Jamiro Monteiro (2024–2026)
  China
  - (China) Xie Yuxin (1987–1989)
  Curaçao
  - (Curaçao) Anton Jongsma (2006–2008) (Note: Born in the Netherlands, Anton Jongsma represented Netherlands Antilles internationally, prior to the countries dissolution in 2010, with Curaçao considered by both UEFA and FIFA as the only inherit successor to the national team of former Netherlands Antilles.)
  - (Curaçao) **Sherel Floranus (2024–present)**
  - (Curaçao) Gillian Justiana (2009–2011)
  - (Curaçao) Gervane Kastaneer (2021–2023)
  - (Curaçao) Darryl Lachman (2018–2020)
  Czech Republic
  - (Czech Republic) Tomáš Necid (2014; 2015)
  DR Congo
  - (Democratic Republic of the Congo) Jody Lukoki (2014–2015)
- Faroe Islands
  - (Faroe Islands) Súni Olsen (2001–2002)
  Finland
  - (Finland) Thomas Lam (2018–2021; 2023–2024)
  - (Finland) Niklas Moisander (2006–2008)
  - (Finland) Jussi Nuorela (1996–1999)
  - (Finland) Paulus Roiha (2003–2004)
  Indonesia
  - (Indonesia) Eliano Reijnders (2018–2025)
  Japan
  - (Japan) Yūta Nakayama (2019–2022)
  Kosovo
  - (Kosovo) Destan Bajselmani (2019–2022)
  Liberia
  - (Liberia) Mark Pabai (2021–2022)
  Netherlands
  - (Netherlands) Cees van Kooten (1983–1985)
  - (Netherlands) Lulof Heetjans (1931–1937)
  - (Netherlands) Piet Schrijvers (1983–1985)
- New Zealand
  - (New Zealand) **Ryan Thomas (2013–2018; 2022–present)**
  North Macedonia
  - (North Macedonia) Georgi Hristov (2003–2004)
  Poland
  - (Poland) Mateusz Klich (2012–2014)
  Suriname
  - (Suriname) Ryan Koolwijk (2021–2022)
  - (Suriname) Dylan Vente (2024–2025)
  United States
  - (United States) Gregg Berhalter (1994–1996)

- Players in bold actively play for PEC Zwolle and for their respective national teams. Years in brackets indicate careerspan with PEC Zwolle.

=== National team players by Confederation ===
Member associations are listed in order of most to fewest of current and former PEC Zwolle players represented Internationally

Total national team players by confederation
| Confederation | Total | (Nation) Association |
|---|---|---|
| AFC | 4 | Australia (1), China (1), Indonesia (1), Japan (1) |
| CAF | 4 | Burkina Faso (1), Cape Verde (1), (Democratic Republic of the Congo) DR Congo (1), Liberia (1) |
| CONCACAF | 8 | Curaçao (5), Suriname (2), United States (1) |
| CONMEBOL | 0 | |
| OFC | 1 | New Zealand (1) |
| UEFA | 13 | Finland (4), Netherlands (3), Bulgaria (1), Czech Republic (1), Faroe Islands (1), Kosovo (1), North Macedonia (1), Poland (1) |

== Players in international tournaments ==
The following is a list of PEC Zwolle players who have competed in international tournaments, including the FIFA World Cup, FIFA Confederations Cup, UEFA European Championship, Copa América, CONCACAF Gold Cup, and the AFC Asian Cup. To this date no PEC Zwolle players have participated in the OFC Nations Cup while playing for PEC Zwolle.

| Cup | Players |
|---|---|
| (Qatar) 1988 AFC Asian Cup | (China) Xie Yuxin |
| (Uruguay) 1995 Copa América | (United States) Gregg Berhalter |
| (Australia) 2015 AFC Asian Cup | (Australia) Trent Sainsbury |
| (Russia) 2017 FIFA Confederations Cup | (New Zealand) Ryan Thomas |
| (Brazil) 2019 Copa América | (Japan) Yūta Nakayama |
| (Costa Rica) (Jamaica) (United States) 2019 CONCACAF Gold Cup | (Curaçao) Darryl Lachman |
| (Europe) UEFA Euro 2020 | (Finland) Thomas Lam |
| (Canada) (United States) 2025 CONCACAF Gold Cup | (Curaçao) Sherel Floranus |
| (Canada) (Mexico) (United States) 2026 FIFA World Cup | (Curaçao) Sherel Floranus (Cape Verde) Jamiro Monteiro (New Zealand) Ryan Thomas |

== Board and staff ==
=== Current board ===
| Position | Staff |
|---|---|
| Board of directors | Arjan Jansen (chairman); Marcel Boudesteyn |
| Technical Director | Marcel Boudesteyn |
| Board of foundation operations | Evert Leideman; Trudy Huisman; Adriaan Visser (chairman); Erben Wennemars; Janco Cnossen; Rob van Kessel |
| Director of management | Arjan Jansen |
| Press Chairmen | Paul Schrijver |

=== Current staff ===
| Position | Staff |
|---|---|
| Head coach | Henry van der Vegt |
| Assistant head coach | Scott Calderwood |
| Goalkeeping coach | Diederik Boer |
| Video Analyst | Hans Van Dijkhuizen |
| Attacking coach | Dwight Blackson |
| Team manager | Mirjam Clifford |

=== List of PEC Zwolle chairmen ===
- (Netherlands) J.B.C. Nieuwhof (1910–??)
- (Netherlands) P. van de Salentein (1918–20)
- (Netherlands) Mr. Viehoff (19??–??)
- (Netherlands) N. Geertsma (1926–37)
- (Netherlands) A. Pinkster (1937–40)
- (Netherlands) K. Drost (1940–42)
- (Netherlands) J.H.C. Gans (1942–46)
- (Netherlands) Michiel Wilhelm (1946–52)
- (Netherlands) H. Egberts (1952–57)
- (Netherlands) J.J. Ruiter (1957–66)
- (Netherlands) C.C. Duyn (1966–69)
- (Netherlands) W.A.M. ten Doeschate (1969–72)
- (Netherlands) Jan-Willem van der Wal (1972–79)
- (Netherlands) Jan Wiersma (1979–82)
- (Netherlands) Max Malcoops (1982–84)
- (Netherlands) Marten Eibrink (1984–88)
- (Netherlands) Jaap de Groot (caretaker) (1988–89)
- (Netherlands) Gaston Sporre (1989–98)
- (Netherlands) Ronald van Vliet (1998–2009)
- (Netherlands) Arjan Jansen (caretaker) (2009)
- (Netherlands) Adriaan Visser (2009–21)

=== List of PEC Zwolle coaches ===
- (Netherlands) Jan van Asten (1955–57)
- (Netherlands) Jan de Roos (1957–58)
- (Netherlands) Piet Vogelzang (ass.) (1957–58)
- (Netherlands) Herman Spijkerman (1958–59)
- (Netherlands) Jan de Roos (1959–61)
- (Netherlands) Herman Spijkerman (1961–63)
- (Netherlands) Cor Sluyk (1963–65)
- (Netherlands) Wim Blokland (1965–66)
- (Netherlands) Jan van Asten (1966–68)
- (Netherlands) Joep Brandes (1968–69)
- (Netherlands) Pim van de Meent (1 July 1969 – 30 June 1970)
- (Hungary) Laszlo Zalai (1970–73)
- (Germany) Georg Keßler (1 July 1973 – 30 June 1974)
- (Austria) Friedrich Donenfeld (1 July 1974 – 30 June 1975)
- (Netherlands) Jan Verhaert (ass.) (1974–75)
- (Netherlands) Hans Alleman (1 July 1975 – 30 June 1977)
- (Germany) Fritz Korbach (1 July 1977 – 30 June 1982)
- (Netherlands) Bas Paauwe (interim) (1982)
- (Netherlands) Rinus Israel (interim) (1982)
- (Netherlands) Cor Brom (1 July 1982 – 30 June 1984)
- (Netherlands) Co Adriaanse (1 July 1984 – 30 June 1988)
- (Netherlands) Ben Hendriks (interim) (1988)
- (Netherlands) Theo Laseroms (1988–89)
- (Netherlands) Theo de Jong (1 July 1989 – 30 June 1992)
- (Netherlands) Ben Hendriks (1992–95)
- (Netherlands) Piet Schrijvers (1 July 1995 – 30 June 1996)
- (Netherlands) Jan Everse (1 July 1996 – 24 December 1998)
- (Netherlands) Dwight Lodeweges (29 December 1998 – 30 June 2001)
- (Netherlands) Paul Krabbe (1 July 2001 – 02)
- (Netherlands) Peter Boeve (1 July 2002 – 26 September 2003)
- (Netherlands) Gerard Nijkamp (interim) (26 September 2003 – 6 October 2003)
- (Netherlands) Hennie Spijkerman (6 October 2003 – 30 June 2006)
- (Netherlands) Harry Sinkgraven (2006)
- (Netherlands) Jan Everse (1 July 2006 – 2 March 2009)
- (Netherlands) Claus Boekweg (int.) (2 March 2009 – 10 March 2009)
- (Netherlands) Marco Roelofsen (int.) (2 March 2009 – V 2009)
- (Netherlands) Jan Everse (1 July 2009 – 30 October 2009)
- (Netherlands) C. Boekweg & (Netherlands) J. Stam (int.) (30 October 2009 – 1 January 2010)
- (Netherlands) Art Langeler (1 January 2010 – 30 June 2013)
- (Netherlands) Ron Jans (1 July 2013 – 30 June 2017)
- (Netherlands) John van 't Schip (1 July 2017 – 19 December 2018)
- (Netherlands) Gert-Peter de Gunst (interim) (19 December 2018 – 28 December 2018)
- (Netherlands) Jaap Stam (28 December 2018 – 31 May 2019)
- (Netherlands) John Stegeman (1 July 2019 – 20 February 2021)
- (Netherlands) Bert Konterman (int.) (27 February 2021 – 27 June 2021)
- (Netherlands) Dick Schreuder (18 November 2021 – 27 June 2023)
- (Netherlands) Johnny Jansen (27 June 2023 – May 2025)
- (Netherlands) Henry van der Vegt (7 May 2025 – 13 October 2026)
- (Netherlands) Dennis van der Ree (int.) (14 October 2026 – 7 November 2026)
- (Netherlands) Alex Pastoor (7 November 2026 – )

== Team records ==
=== Topscorers ===
- 1989–90 : (Netherlands) Richard Roelofsen (11)
- 1990–91 : (Netherlands) Marco Roelofsen (12)
- 1991–92 : (Netherlands) Gérard van der Nooij (10)
- 1992–93 : (Netherlands) Martin Reynders (11)
- 1993–94 : (Netherlands) Remco Boere (13)
- 1994–95 : (Netherlands) Remco Boere (10)
- 1994–95 : (Netherlands) Henri van der Vegt (10)
- 1995–96 : (Romania) Lucian Ilie (7)
- 1996–97 : (Netherlands) Jan Bruin (11)
- 1997–98 : (Netherlands) Jan Bruin (14)
- 1998–99 : (Netherlands) Arne Slot (18)
- 1999–00 : (Netherlands) Dirk Jan Derksen (28)
- 2000–01 : (Netherlands) Richard Roelofsen (14)
- 2001–02 : (Netherlands) Arne Slot (12)
- 2002–03 : (Netherlands) Richard Roelofsen (8)
- 2003–04 : (Netherlands) Jasar Takak (8)
- 2004–05 : (Netherlands) Ruud Berger (13)
- 2005–06 : (Netherlands) Santi Kolk (18)
- 2006–07 : (Netherlands) Anton Jongsma (14)
- 2007–08 : (Portugal) Tozé Marreco (15)
- 2008–09 : (Netherlands) Dave Huymans (8)
- 2008–09 : (Netherlands) Derk Boerrigter (8)
- 2009–10 : (Netherlands) Eldridge Rojer (12)
- 2010–11 : (Netherlands) Sjoerd Ars (20)
- 2011–12 : (Netherlands) Nassir Maachi (18)
- 2012–13 : (Sweden) Denni Avdić (8)
- 2012–13 : (Netherlands) Fred Benson (8)
- 2013–14 : (Netherlands) Guyon Fernandez (10)
- 2014–15 : (Czech Republic) Tomáš Necid (12)
- 2015–16 : (South Africa) Lars Veldwijk (14)
- 2016–17 : (Netherlands) Queensy Menig (9)
- 2017–18 : (Netherlands) Mustafa Saymak (11)
- 2018–19 : (Netherlands) Vito van Crooij (9)
- 2018–19 : (Germany) Lennart Thy (9)
- 2019–20 : (Iran) Reza Ghoochannejhad (7)
- 2020–21 : (Iran) Reza Ghoochannejhad (6)
- 2021–22 : (Netherlands) Daishawn Redan (6)
- 2022–23 : (Germany) Lennart Thy (23)

== See also ==
- PEC Zwolle (women)
- List of football clubs in the Netherlands
