= Ron Jans =

Dutch football manager (born 1958)

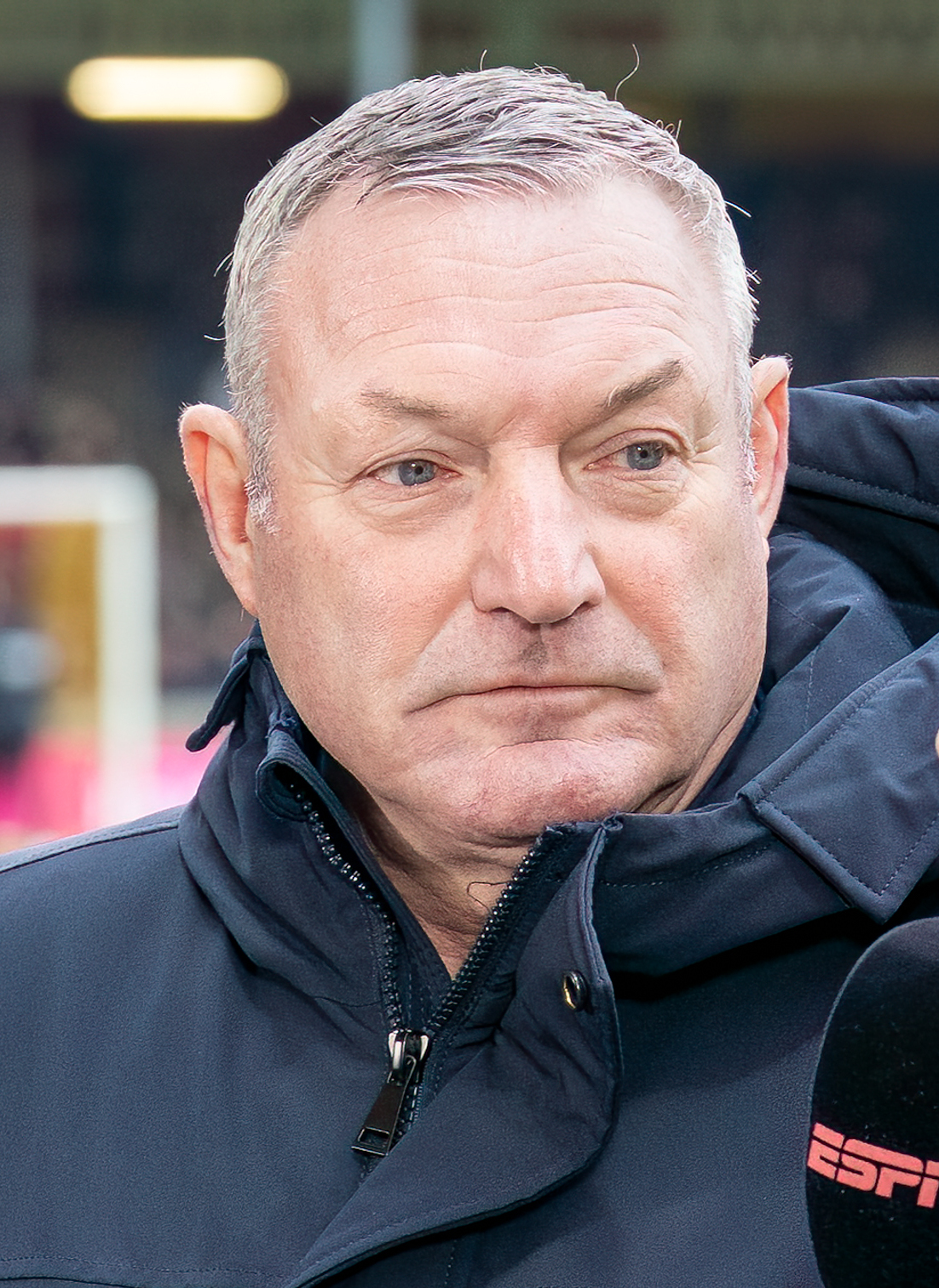
- Jans as Utrecht head coach in 2023

Personal information
- Date of birth: 29 September 1958 (age 68)
- Place of birth: Zwolle, Netherlands
- Position: Striker

Youth career
- RKSV Zwolle

Senior career*
Years	Team	Apps	(Gls)
1976–1982	PEC Zwolle	157	(44)
1982–1984	Groningen	63	(16)
1984–1987	Roda JC	99	(10)
1987–1988	Mazda Motors	16	(1)
1988–1991	BV Veendam	54	(5)
Total		389	(76)

Managerial career
- 1991–1993: SJS Stadskanaal
- 1993–1996: ACV
- 1996–2000: Achilles 1894
- 2000–2002: BVO Emmen (assistant)
- 2002–2010: Groningen
- 2010–2012: Heerenveen
- 2012: Standard Liège
- 2013–2017: PEC Zwolle
- 2019–2020: FC Cincinnati
- 2020–2023: Twente
- 2023–2026: Utrecht
- * Club domestic league appearances and goals

Ron Jans (Dutch pronunciation: [rɔˈɲɑns]; born 29 September 1958) is a Dutch former professional football manager and player.

Jans spent most of his managerial career in the Eredivisie and also spent time in charge of Standard Liège and FC Cincinnati. He is best known for leading PEC Zwolle to victory in the 2013–14 KNVB Cup, earning the club's first major trophy.

== Coaching career ==
=== Groningen ===
Born in Zwolle, Overijssel, Jans joined Groningen on 2002, and was the longest-serving head coach in the whole Eredivisie, being instrumental in the club's recent successes, including two consecutive UEFA Cup qualifications in 2005 and 2006. During his time at Groningen, Jans was known for his witty comments during press conferences and his positive attitude towards the press. He was formerly active as a German language teacher. He also appeared regularly in the Dutch television channel Nederland 3 as a UEFA Champions League analyst for the 2009–10 season.

In November 2009, he announced he would leave Groningen at the end of the 2009–10 season, after eight years in charge of the club, citing his desire for a new experience as the main reason behind his choice.

=== Heerenveen ===
In February 2010, Heerenveen officials agreed terms with the Groningen coach for next season, the 51-year-old joined his new club at the end of the season to replace Jan de Jonge. The move was quite a controversy as Heerenveen and Groningen are great rivals in the Eredivisie. Jans was seen as a Groningen ace and the supporters did not think much of his step to the rivals. After the news came out, the fans showed a banner saying: "You never knew how to replace someone." With this message, they showed their dislike of the move of the manager on the one hand, and sneered at how he sometimes substituted players that hardly made any sense.

Jans' first season in charge of Heerenveen was mostly considered as disappointing, as he only managed to achieve an unimpressive twelfth place in the league table and was also criticized due to a number of controversial choices. His second season turned out however to be much better, thanks to his ability to get the most out of forwards Bas Dost, Luciano Narsingh and Oussama Assaidi and drive the team into the battle for the league title by April 2012. In January 2012, it was revealed that Jans would depart from Heerenveen at the end of the season, with former Dutch superstar player Marco van Basten taking over from him. He led Heerenveen to direct UEFA Europa League qualification by the end of the season.

=== Standard Liège ===
He signed to Standard Liège on 29 May 2012, but agreed with the club to end his contract on 22 October after Standard was at that time 12th in the Belgian Pro League.

=== PEC Zwolle ===
Jans joined PEC Zwolle in 2013. In his first season with the Blauwvingers, he won the KNVB Cup after beating Ajax 5–1 in the final. In the 2014–15 season, Jans guided PEC Zwolle to victory in the 2014 Johan Cruyff Shield, defeating champions Ajax 1–0 in Amsterdam. Later that season, he led Zwolle to another KNVB Cup final, losing 2–0 to Groningen.

=== FC Cincinnati ===
On 26 July 2019, The Athletic reported that Jans had been hired as the head coach of American club FC Cincinnati, and would replace interim coach Yoann Damet as soon as he obtained a work visa. FC Cincinnati officially announced the hiring on 5 August 2019, ending a months-long coach search that began with their firing of Alan Koch in May 2019. This was Jans' second time working with FC Cincinnati general manager Gerard Nijkamp, who had hired Jans in 2013 when he was technical director of PEC Zwolle. Jans' contract was set to expire on 31 December 2020, with Nijkamp having previously indicated that their coach hire would be a "short-term solution" to be re-evaluated ahead of the 2021 season.

On 17 February 2020, Jans resigned from his head coach position at FC Cincinnati amidst an investigation into his alleged use of a racial slur.

=== Twente ===
Jans was appointed as head coach of Twente on 17 June 2020. Upon the expiration of his contract, along with that of technical director Jan Streuer, the pair was released from the club. His final game saw the team qualify for the UEFA Europa Conference League second qualifying round with a 2–1 aggregate score against Sparta Rotterdam in the final of the European competition playoffs on 11 June 2023.

=== Utrecht ===
In September 2023, Jans became the head coach of Utrecht, succeeding Michael Silberbauer. During his first full season in charge of the Domstedelingen, Jans guided the team to a fourth-place finish in the 2024–25 Eredivisie, securing a place in the Europa League second qualifying round.

In January 2026, Jans announced that he would retire following the 2025–26 season. His Utrecht side finished sixth in the Eredivisie that season, missing out on European qualification for the 2026–27 season by losing the Eredivisie European competition play-offs final on penalties to Ajax after a 1–1 draw.

== Managerial statistics ==
As of match played 24 May 2026

Managerial record by team and tenure
Team	Nat	From	To	Record								Ref
Team	Nat	From	To	G	W	D	L	GF	GA	GD	Win %	Ref
Groningen	(Netherlands)	21 October 2002	30 June 2010	310	128	66	116	455	435	+20	41.29	
Heerenveen	(Netherlands)	1 July 2010	29 May 2012	75	33	21	21	164	122	+42	44.00	
Standard Liège	(Belgium)	29 May 2012	22 October 2012	12	5	1	6	24	23	+1	41.67	
PEC Zwolle	(Netherlands)	30 June 2013	20 June 2017	159	61	36	62	251	244	+7	38.36	
FC Cincinnati	(United States)	4 August 2019	17 February 2020	10	1	4	5	8	20	−12	10.00	
Twente	(Netherlands)	17 June 2020	30 June 2023	116	56	31	29	194	128	+66	48.28	
Utrecht	(Netherlands)	11 September 2023	30 June 2026	124	58	32	34	211	159	+52	46.77	
Total				806	342	191	273	1,307	1,131	+176	42.43	—

== Honours ==
=== Manager ===
PEC Zwolle

- KNVB Cup: 2013–14
- Johan Cruyff Shield: 2014

Individual

- Eredivisie Manager of the Month: May 2026
