= Colonial Reserve Corps =

Branch of the Royal Netherlands East Indies Army

- Korps Koloniale Reserve
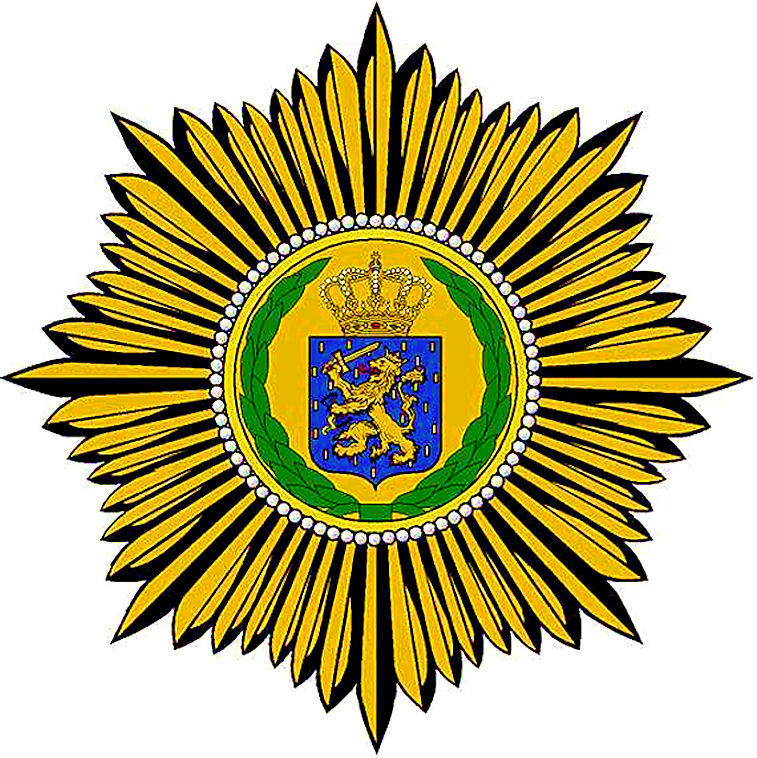
- Royal Netherlands East Indies Army coat of arms
- Founded: 24 August 1890
- Disbanded: 11 March 1951
- Service branches: Recruitment and training
- Headquarters: Nijmegen, Netherlands

Leadership
- Lieutenant-Colonel: J. Slagter (Last)
- Minister of Colonies: Charles Welter (Last)

Personnel
- Conscription: No
- Reserve personnel: 1000

The Colonial Reserve Corps was an arm of the Royal Netherlands East Indies Army and an important recruitment depot. The Corps existed from 1890 to 1951 and was located in the Prins Hendrikbarracks in Nijmegen.

== History ==
Before the creation of the Colonial Reserve in 1890, a colonial recruitment depot existed in Harderwijk, founded around 1830. Initially the recruitment and training for the Royal Dutch East Indies Army (KNIL) took place here. These included non-Dutch European volunteers. In general, that went without too many problems. It was not until after 1870 that it became more difficult for the Dutch military authorities to recruit sufficient foreign personnel, because countries such as France and Germany undertook measures to discourage the service of their nationals in the armies of foreign powers. The Ministry of Colonies and War was forced to focus on the recruitment of Dutch nationals as volunteers for colonial military service. These recruits were usually recruited in small numbers.

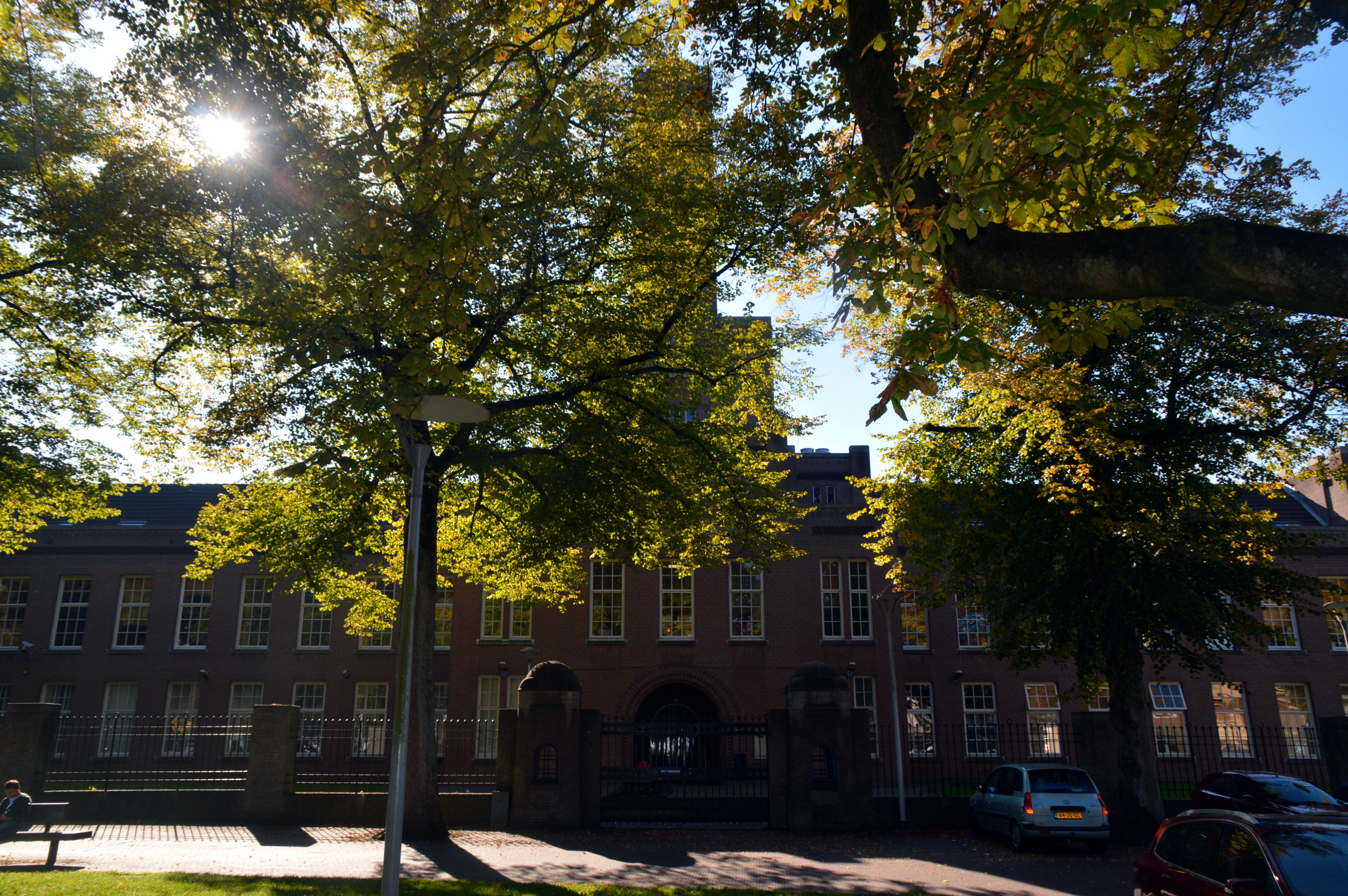
Prins Hendrik Barracks

The Koloniaal Werfdepot had been popularly known as the "gutterhole of Europe", because of the continued recruitment of mercenaries from all over Europe. For Dutch volunteers, service in the KNIL retained a certain social stigma; a prejudice which had a negative effect on recruitment numbers. At the end of the nineteenth century the awareness gradually arose at the Ministry of Colonies that the quality of the military personnel destined for the Dutch Indies had to be improved.

In 1890 Lieutenant Colonel Josephus Fredericus Dominicus Bruinsma became the first commander of the Royal Colonial Reserve Corps, established by Royal Decree of 24 August 1890, with Captain Johannes Rudolph Jacobs as his adjutant. The Corps was under the command of the Minister of Colonies and was set up to replace the Indian brigade, which had been authorized by Royal Decree of 9 March 1874, number 32, but which had not been successfully established. There was a need for such a reserve corps for the Colonies because the constitution prohibited the use of the Royal Netherlands Army for service outside Europe. The corps was also intended to prepare veteran colonial soldiers returning from the East and West Indies for reentry into Dutch civilian society. In the initial period, the staff of this corps was located in Zutphen, but the instructors and cadres were soon moved to Nijmegen and from 1911 the Prins Hendrik Barracks was their home base. Bruinsma was succeeded in April 1895 by Gijsbertus Godefriedus Johannes Notten as the second commander of the Colonial Reserve Corps. After first having been located in the Waal Barracks in the Lower Town (Benedenstad), the corps left for the newly built Prins Hendrik Barracks in 1911.

The soldiers of the (KNIL) were popularly called "colonials". During their months of training, they were thoroughly prepared for the tropical Indies. They trained with field marches, practiced gymnastics and took lessons in fencing. They learned Malay and were given food from the Indies twice a week. The Corps was dissolved one year after the KNIL, in 1951.

== International Four Days Marches Nijmegen ==
For the corps, remote mating was of great importance. In recruitment, for example, they could be used as a propaganda tool. The corps members, in fact, walked in striking exotic uniforms and showed themselves in different places to the population. On the other hand, the marches could also be used in the training of soldiers so that they would be well prepared for the long patrols in the Dutch East Indies. The Colonial Reserve was the basis of the Nijmegen Four Days Marches. The first edition, which was organized in 1909 by the Dutch Association for Physical Education (NBvLO), had a different design than today. During that edition, Nijmegen was only the end point of one of the routes. Three years later the Four Days Marches departed from Utrecht. On the third day, the participants then walked from Ede via the Betuwe to Nijmegen to spend the night there in the Prins Hendrik Barracks, home of the Colonial Reserve. On the last day there was a walk through the surroundings of Nijmegen and the barracks were again the end point. This pleased the organization so well that the barracks from 1925 up to and including 1946 were the starting point of the trip.

== Indies Nijmegen ==
In the period between 1910 and 1930 several prosperous Nijmegen families who had become rich in the Dutch East Indies had built villas. Beautiful examples of mansions where retired KNIL officers have lived can be found at the Oranjesingel and the Groesbeekseweg. The KNIL soldiers were entitled to leave every six years and then returned to Nijmegen, the place where they had left. Depending on their grade, their leave lasted for six to twelve months. It was customary that people would come across accompanied with the whole family during their leave. In Nijmegen there are holiday homes at various places, including the Fransestraat, Javastraat and Burghardt van den Bergstraat in Nijmegen.

== Gallery ==
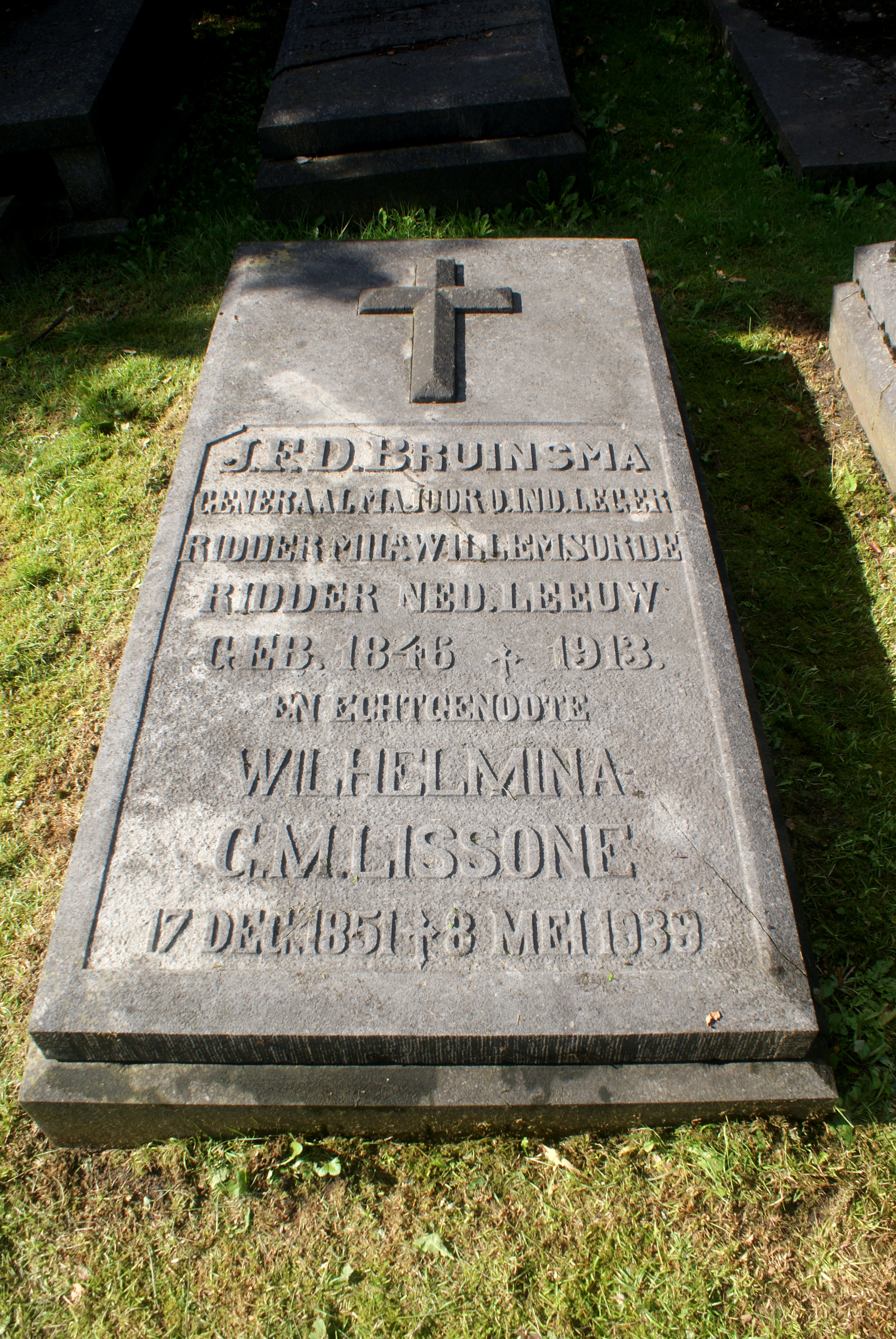
Grave of Josephus Fredericus Dominicus Bruinsma

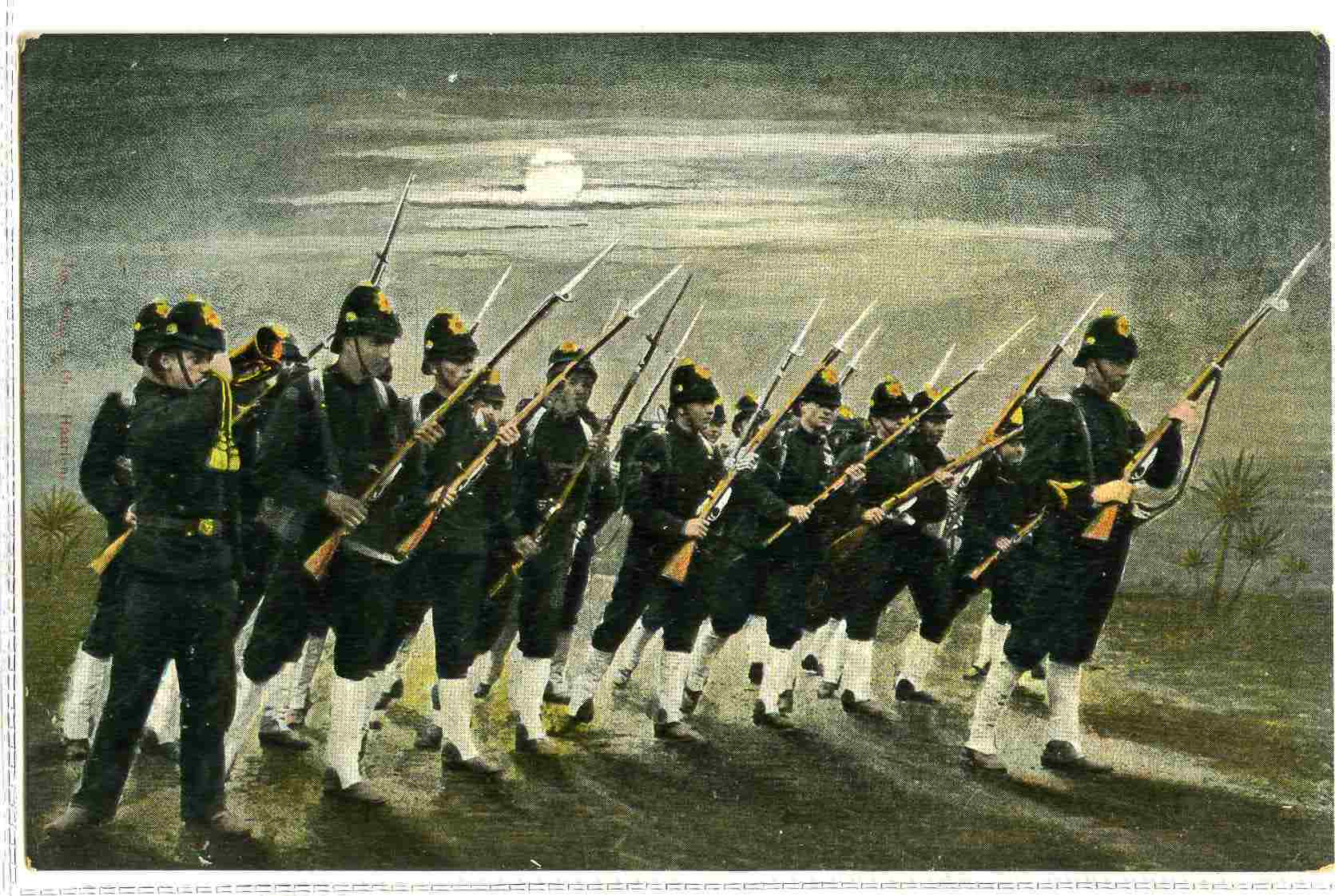

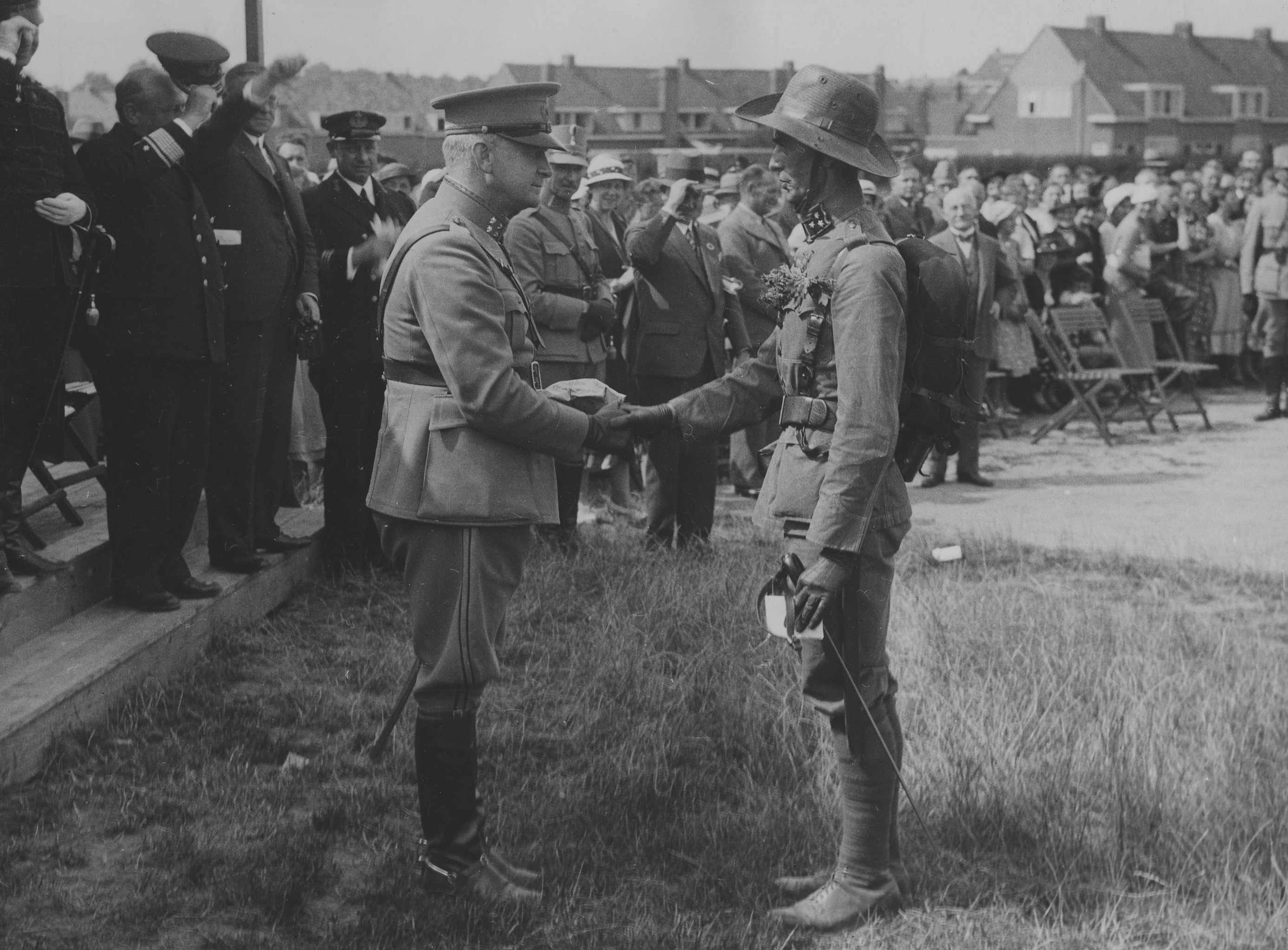

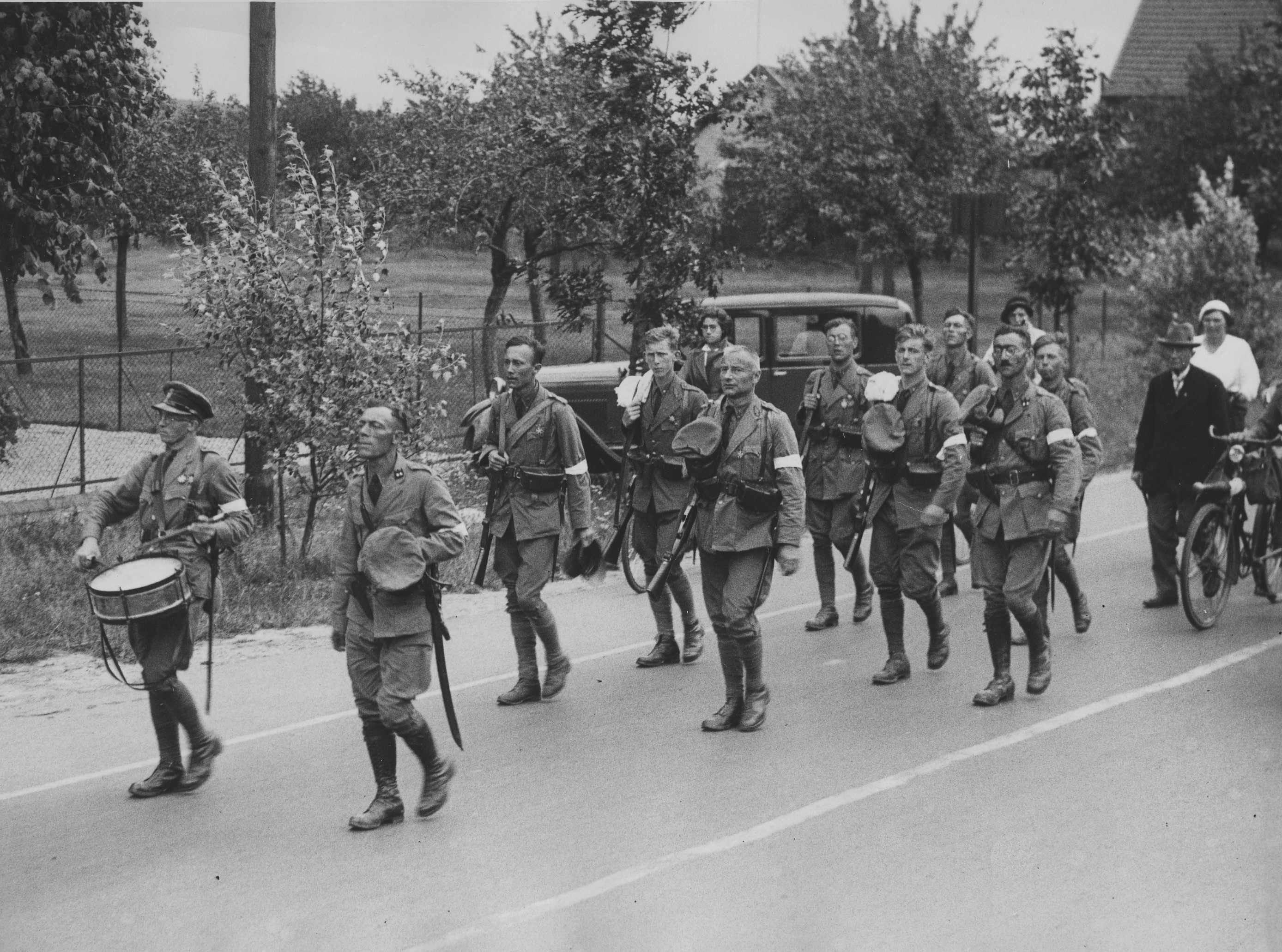

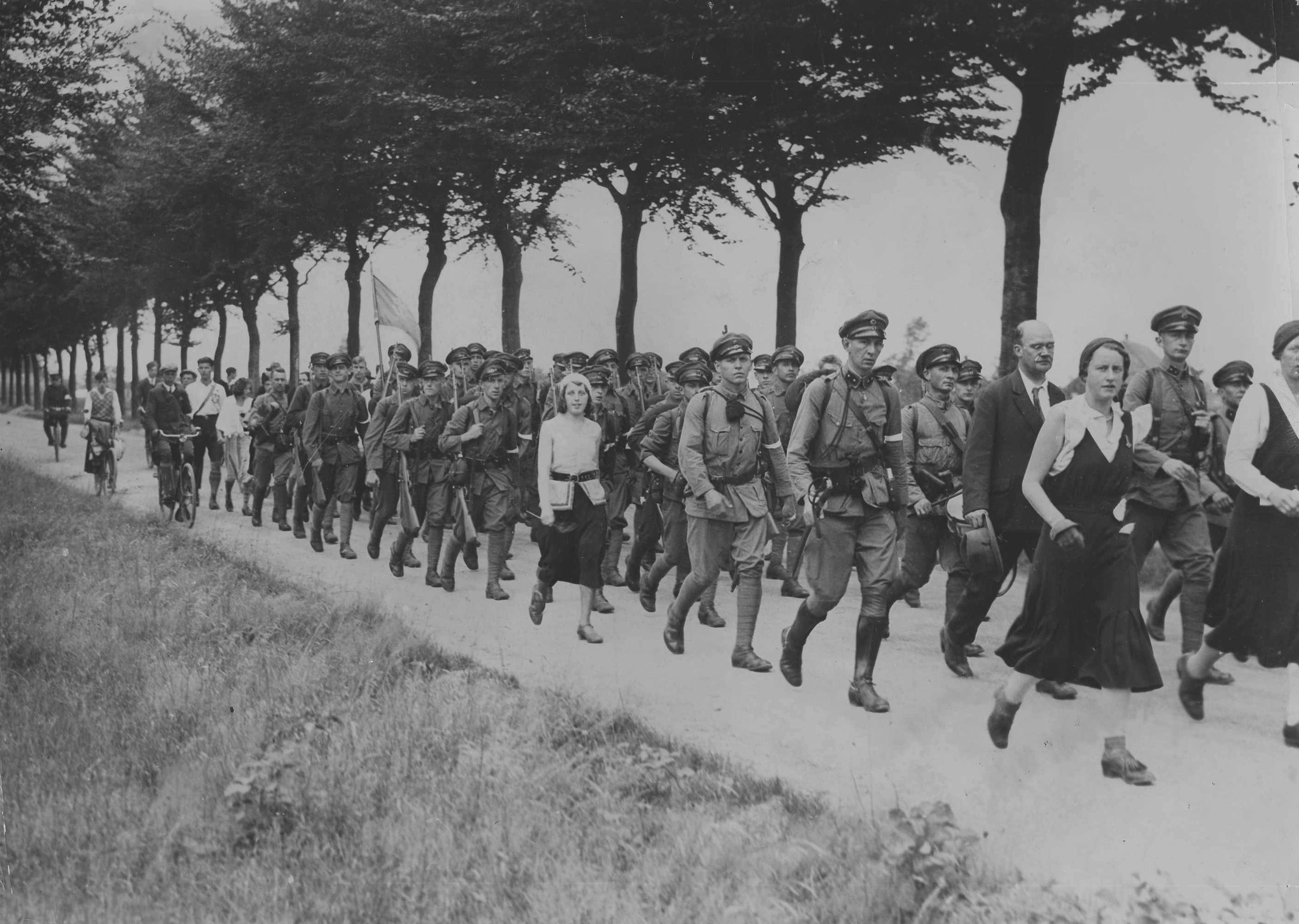

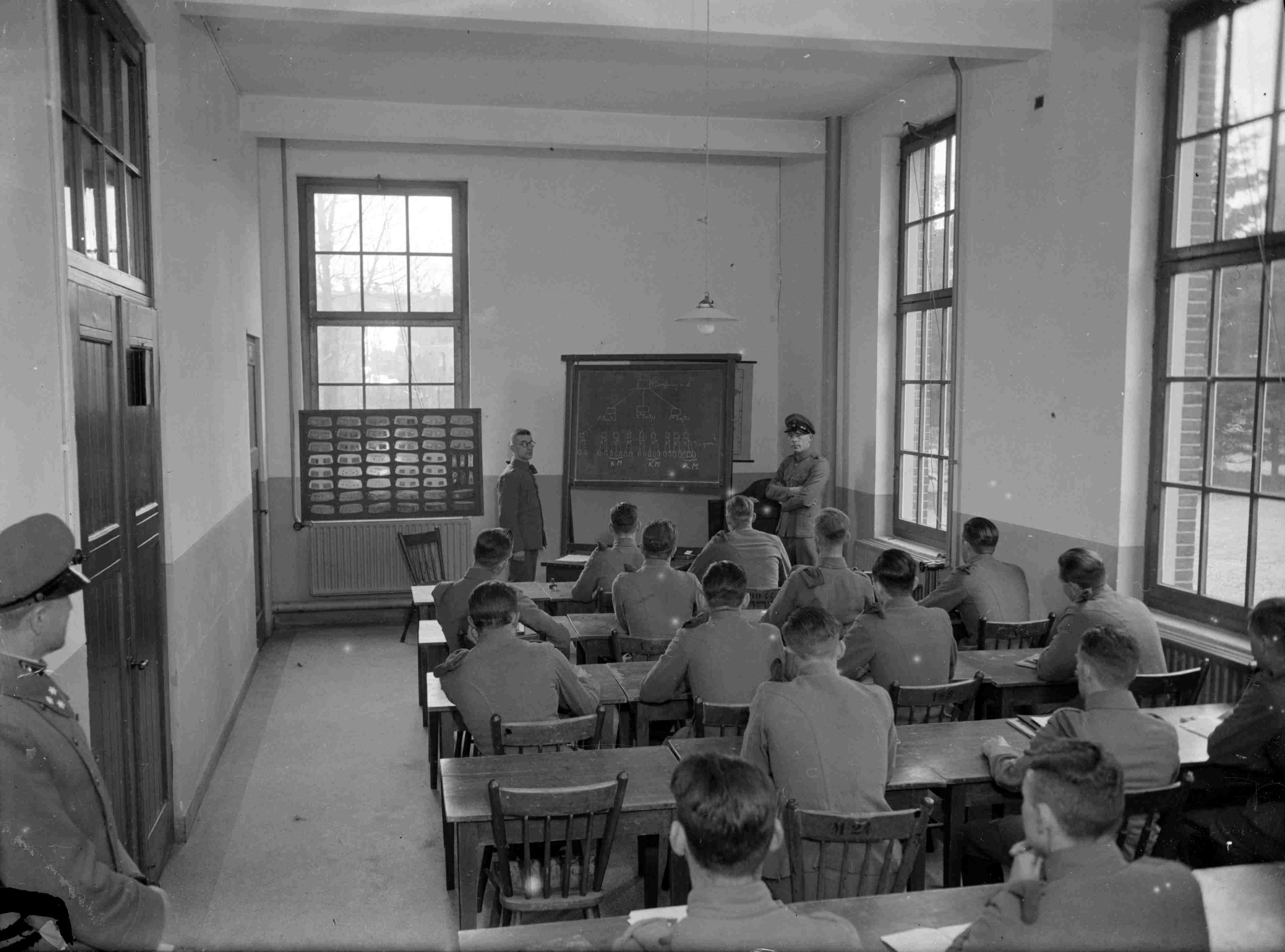
Instruction meeting for soldiers of the Colonial Reserve in the Prins Hendrik barracks (1939)
