= Neodriessenia =

Scientific classification
- Kingdom: Plantae
- Clade: Tracheophytes
- Clade: Angiosperms
- Clade: Eudicots
- Clade: Rosids
- Order: Myrtales
- Family: Melastomataceae
- Genus: Neodriessenia; M.P.Nayar

Species of flowering plant

Neodriessenia is a genus of flowering plants belonging to the family Melastomataceae.

It is native to Borneo.

The genus name of Neodriessenia is in honour of Peter van Driessen (1753–1828), a Dutch doctor, pharmacist, chemist and botanist. He was also professor of medicine in Harderwijk and Groningen. It was first described and published in Bull. Bot. Surv. India Vol.16 on page 21 in 1977.

== Known species ==
According to Kew:

- Neodriessenia candelabra C.Hansen
- Neodriessenia hirta (Ridl.) M.P.Nayar
- Neodriessenia pilosa M.P.Nayar
- Neodriessenia purpurea M.P.Nayar
- Neodriessenia scorpioidea (Stapf) M.P.Nayar
- Neodriessenia tectiflora C.Hansen
