= Vischpoort =

Coordinates: 52°21′06″N 5°37′07″E

The Vischpoort or Vispoort is a late-14th-century city gate and former lighthouse in Harderwijk, Netherlands. The gate, which is located on the historical seaside of the Zuiderzee, is the only one of five gates in the city walls that remains. Between 1851 and 1947 the Vischpoort served as a lighthouse. The Vischpoort is listed as a national heritage site (Dutch: rijksmonument).

== History ==
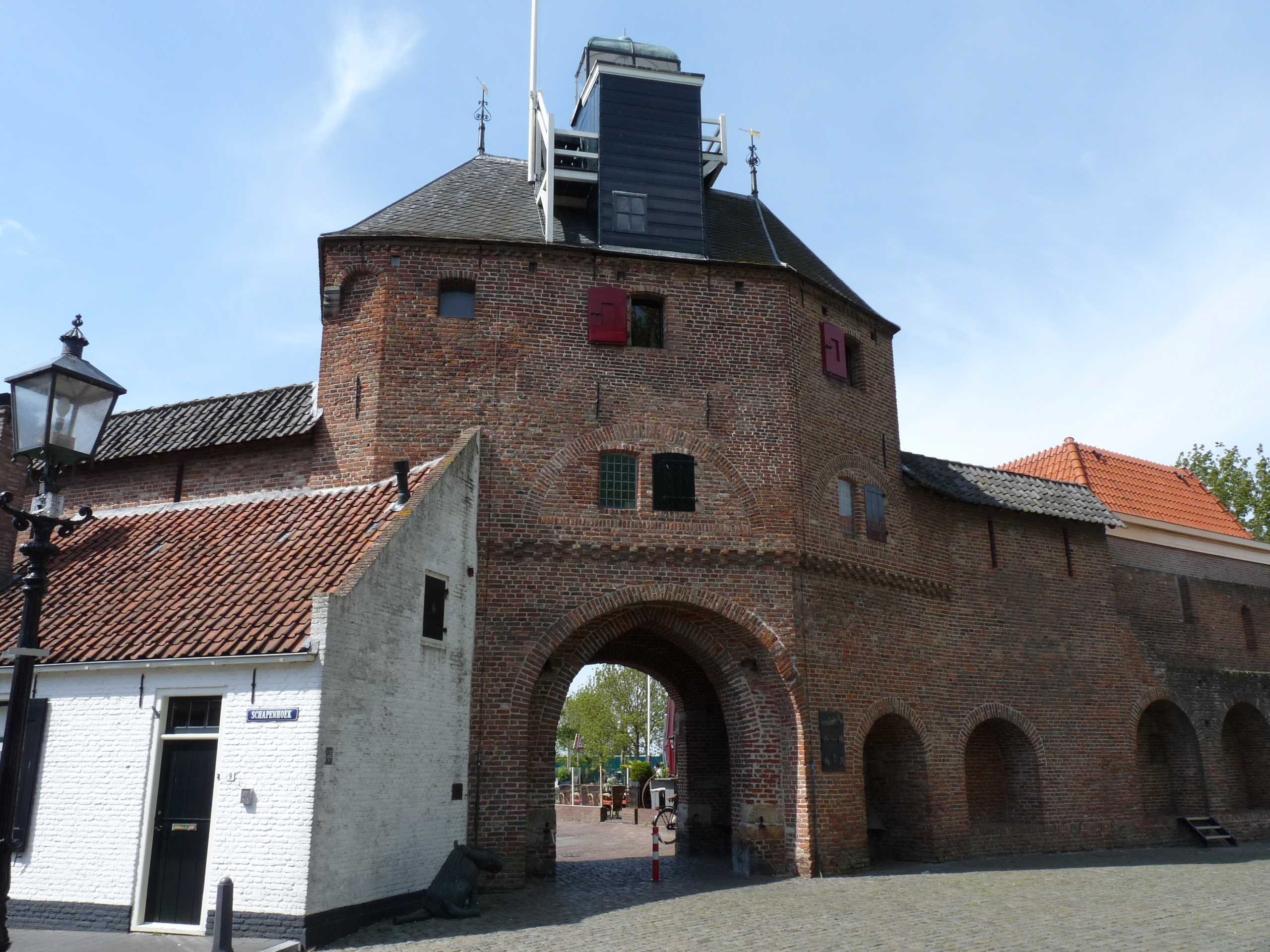
Cityside view of the Vischpoort

The Vischpoort was constructed in the late 14th century as part of the larger erection of the city walls of Harderwijk. Of the current structure the lower half is from the 14th century, while the top half, above the corbel, is from the subsequent century. There were five city gates in Harderwijk, three on the landside, and two on the seaside; of these five the Vischpoort is the only one that remains.

The Vischpoort was one of the two seaside gates and was originally called the Lage Bruggepoort. On the seaside of the gate there was a wooden pier onto which small boats could load and unload cargo. Due to the lack of depth of the water, larger ships had to anchor further away.

The interior of the Vischpoort consists of two floors. The room above the gate was meant as a guardroom, with the guards being tasked to guard both the sea as well as the city. To both the left and right side of the interior part of the gate small cottages are attached. The city wall is still present on both sides of the Vischpoort.

During its existence the Vischpoort saw frequent changes and renovations. One of these was the former presence of two towers of which now only small marks remain.

The arch of the gate still shows the grooves in which planks were placed against upcoming floods. With the completion of the Afsluitdijk in 1932 the Zuiderzee became a lake and the Vischpoort was not subject to tides and floods anymore. The hinges of the former doors are still present. A set of doors of the Vischpoort were transported to Zutphen in 1715 and found again centuries later in the eastern Netherlands region of the Achterhoek. They were subsequently placed in the Vischpoort again months after their rediscovery in 2014.

In 1973 the Vischpoort underwent its most recent renovation. As an historical military object it is listed as rijksmonument 20221.

The Vischpoort previously served as working space for an architectal firm and a gallery. It currently serves as space for the historical society of Harderwijk, the Oudheidkundige Vereniging Herderewich. The Harderwijk city guides also use the building.

== Lighthouse ==
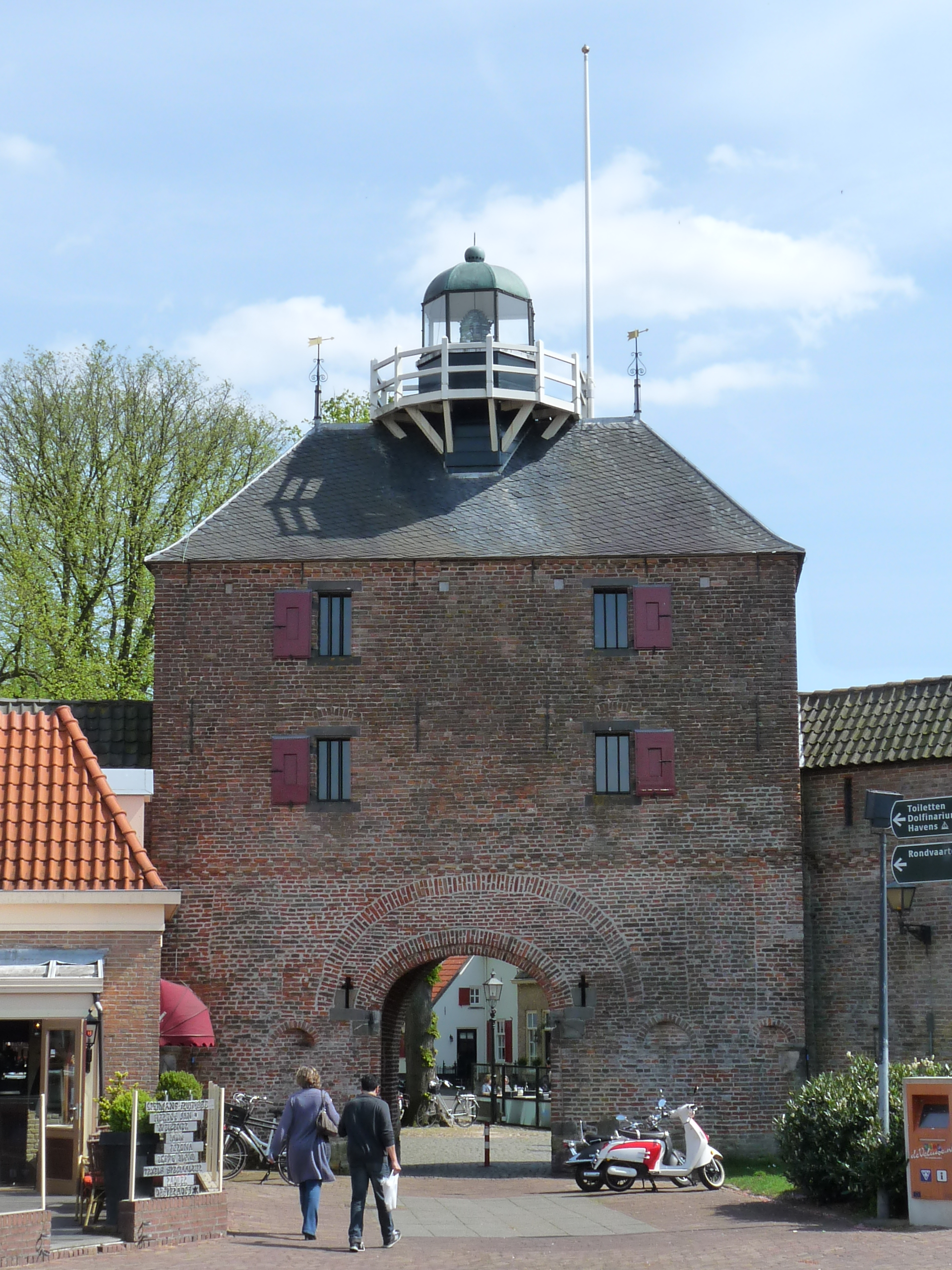
Waterside view of the Vischpoort

In 1851 a small tower was fitted onto the Vischpoort which held a gas powered red light which made the gate a lighthouse and beacon. The light was recovered from a beacon in Scheveningen. The Dutch government paid the costs of the operation of the light and Harderwijk was responsible for the salary of the lighthouse keeper.

In 1928 the light was to be extinguished due to economic difficulties. The Dutch government eventually decided not to turn the light off: instead it transferred ownership and maintenance to the municipality of Harderwijk. In 1930 the gas light was replaced by an electrical white light with an intensity of one million candelas, making 22 revolutions per minute. In 1947 the light became obsolete and was extinguished. Since 2006 the light has been in use again, although it is used only on special occasions.

The former lighthouse keeper lived in the Vischpoort on the top floor. He accessed his quarters by outdoor wooden stairs.
