= Harry van den Brink =

Dutch military personnel

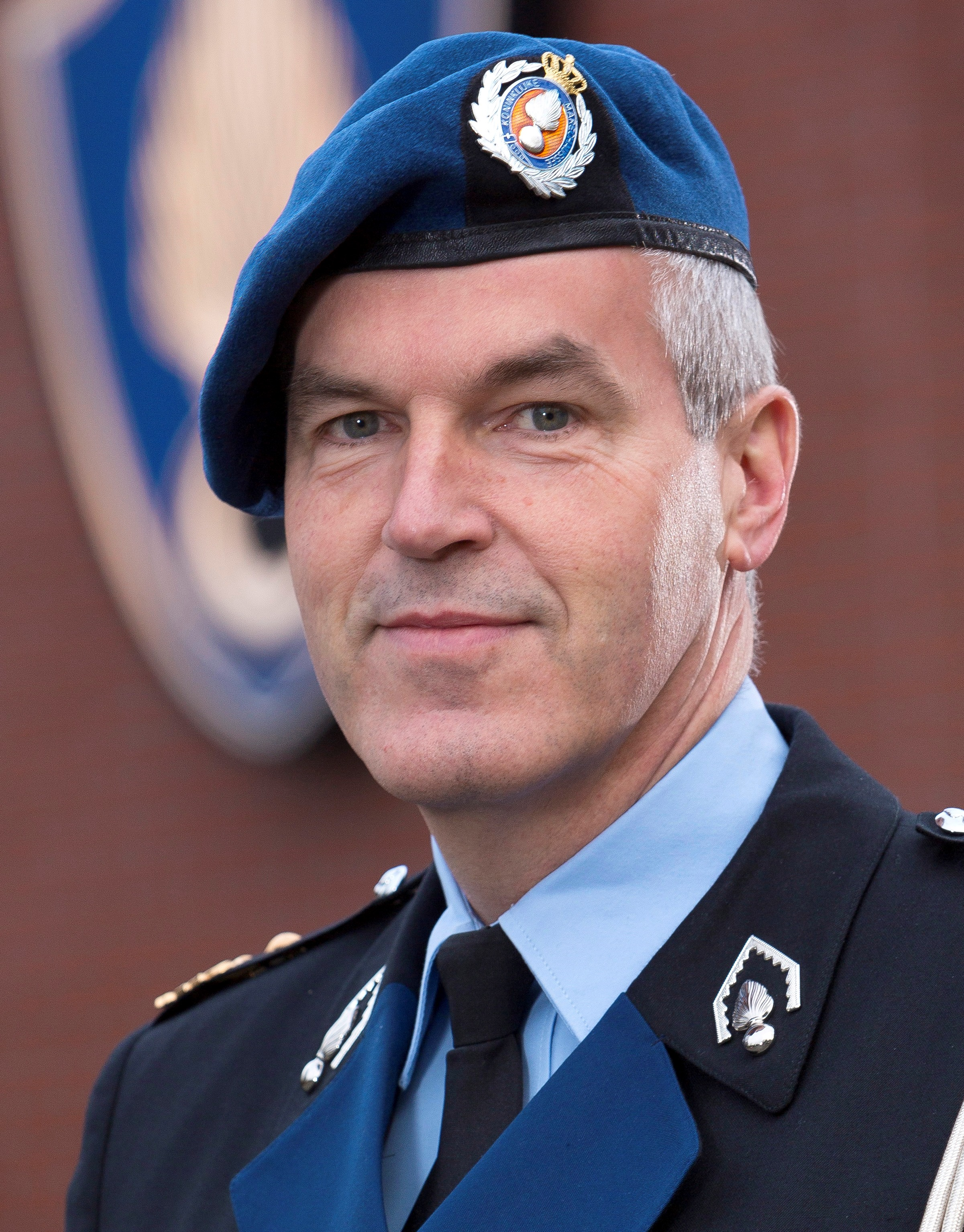
- Portrait of Harry van den Brink
- Born: 1961 (age 64–65) Harderwijk
- Rank: Lieutenant general
- Commands: Royal Marechaussee

Harry van den Brink (Harderwijk, 1961) is a Dutch officer. He has been the commander of the Royal Marechaussee since November 2015.

When he was 17, he started his career in the Marechaussee. He worked at the security of Palace Soestdijk and the border security at Schiphol.
