= Marco Roelofsen =

Dutch footballer and manager (born 1968)

Personal information
- Date of birth: 3 October 1968 (age 58)
- Place of birth: Harderwijk, Netherlands
- Height: 1.88 m (6 ft 2 in)
- Position: Midfielder

Team information
- Current team: Go-Ahead Kampen (manager)

Youth career
- VVOG

Senior career*
Years	Team	Apps	(Gls)
1987–1990	Twente	63	(7)
1990	→ NEC (loan)	21	(2)
1991	PEC Zwolle	15	(9)
1991–1996	Heerenveen	179	(29)
1997–2004	PEC Zwolle	230	(24)
Total		508	(71)

Managerial career
- 2009: PEC Zwolle (caretaker)
- 2010–2013: Jong PSV
- 2014: VVOG
- 2015–2017: Sparta Nijkerk
- 2018–: Go-Ahead Kampen
- * Club domestic league appearances and goals

Marco Roelofsen (born 3 October 1968) is a Dutch professional football manager and former player, who is the current head coach of sixth-tier Eerste Klasse club Go-Ahead Kampen.

== Playing career ==
A former midfielder, Roelofsen started his professional career in the 1987–88 season as part of the FC Twente team. He later also played for NEC, PEC Zwolle and Heerenveen. He retired in 2004.

== Managerial career ==
In the summer of 2004, Roelofsen was included in the technical staff of PEC Zwolle, where he became head coach of the under-19 team. At the end of the 2008–09 season, he became the first team's caretaker coach, replacing Jan Everse, who had been temporarily suspended. In the summer of 2010, he moved to PSV, where he became the head coach of the second team, Jong PSV. On 3 July 2013, it was announced that Roelofsen would become the new coach of the Heerenveen under-21 team after having signed a one-year contract. Roelofsen, who played for Heerenveen from 1991 to 1996, succeeded Jan de Jonge who left for Heracles Almelo. In the 2014–15 season, Roelofsen was coach of Vitesse under-19 team until February 2015. Roelofsen then became head coach of Sparta Nijkerk from November 2015 to October 2017. Roelofsen became head coach of Go-Ahead Kampen in the sixth-tier Eerste Klasse from the 2018–19 season.

== Personal life ==
His nephew, Richard Roelofsen, also played football on the highest level in the Netherlands.
