= Prins Hendrik Barracks =

- Nijmegen
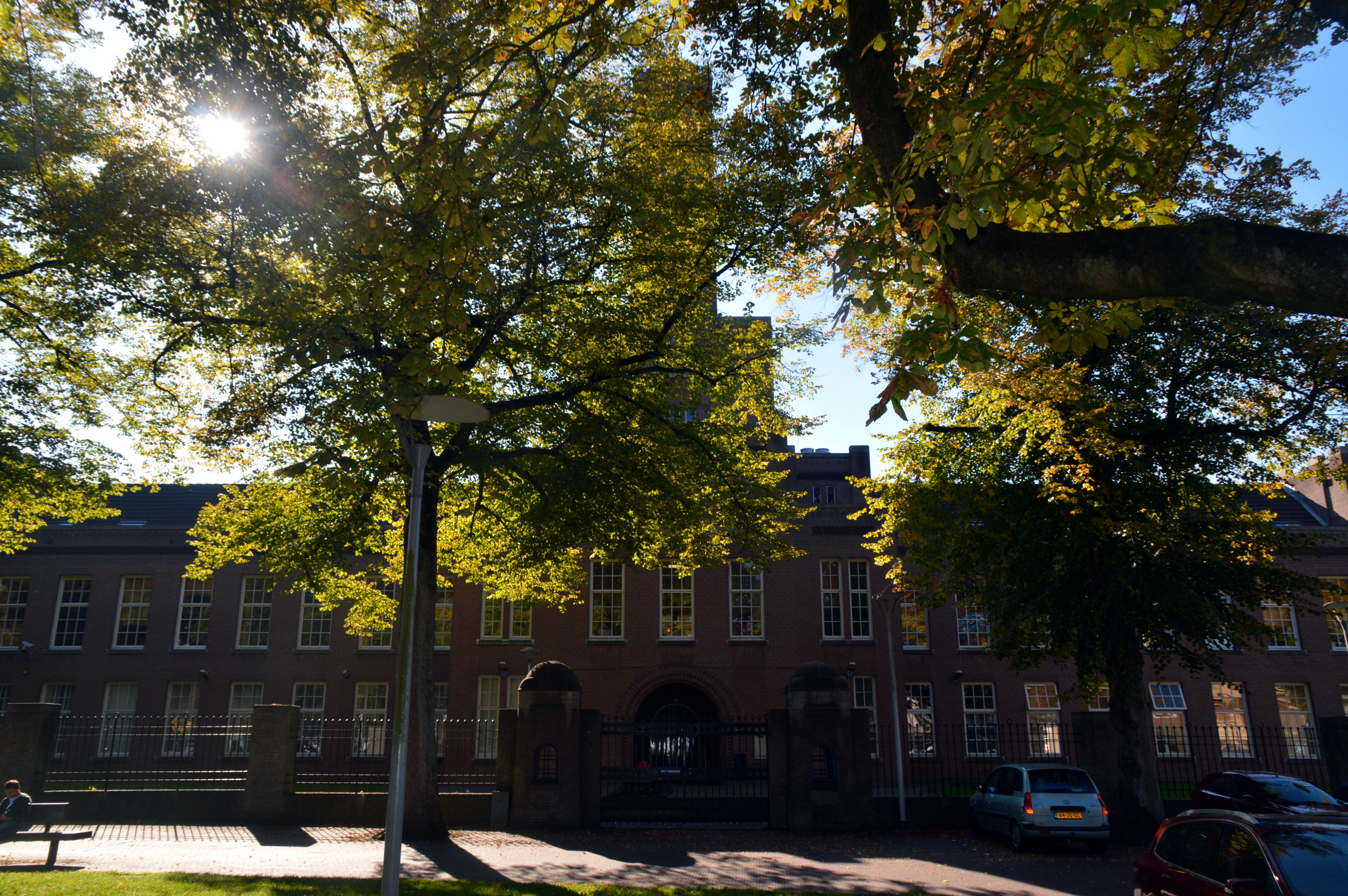
- Prins Hendrik Barracks front building

Site information
- Type: Barracks
- Operator: Ministry of Colonies

Site history
- Built: 1909-1911
- Built for: Colonial Reserve Corps
- Architect: Jos Limburg
- In use: 1911-1995

Garrison information
- Occupants: Royal Netherlands East Indies Army

The Prins Hendrik Barracks (Dutch: Prins Hendrikkazerne) are former barracks in the Netherlands city Nijmegen.

== History ==
The barracks were built between 1909 and 1911 on behalf of the Ministry of Colonies as Education School for soldiers and Petty Officers of the KNIL to a design by architect Jos Limburg in the style of rationalism, and is named after Duke Henry of Mecklenburg-Schwerin who laid the first stone himself. The Colonial Reserve Corps moved in 1911 from the Waal barracks in the Benedenstad to this barracks in Nijmegen-Oost on the corner of the Dommer van Poldersveldtweg and the Daalseweg. With the move almost all activities of the Colonial Reserve were accommodated in Nijmegen: recruitment and selection, training, the care of broadcasting and handling of the returned and health care for the sick and wounded. The care for disabled people took place at Bronbeek in Arnhem. After the Second World War the role of the barracks changed. The KNIL was officially dissolved on 26 July 1950. For the handling of the administration due to the demobilization of KNIL soldiers who were not included in Royal Netherlands Army, the 'KNIL Center Netherlands' was established. On 14 March 1951 the center was officially closed. Until 1953, colonial military cases were still being dealt with. In 1951 the complex, together with the nearby Krayenhoff Barracks and Snijders Barracks, was taken into use by the Air Force Instruction and Military Training School (LIMOS). In 1995 the army pushed off the barracks and the complex became an asylum seekers' center. The barracks have a monument status. The Military Hospital, which was a separate part of the barracks, was demolished in 1992. Some smaller buildings that were part of the hospital, such as the porter's house and the so-called octagonal low 'radio building', have been redesigned.

=== International Four Days Marches Nijmegen ===
For the Colonial Reserve, located in the barracks, distance marts were of great importance. From 1912, space was made available as accommodation for the participants in a four-day walking event that Nijmegen visited. This was the origin of the International Four Days Marches Nijmegen. The barracks were from 1925 to 1946 the starting point and the finish of the tour. From 1928 to 1938 the Flag Parade, the official opening of the Four Days Marches of Nijmegen, was held in the barracks courtyard and adjacent Molenveld.

== Building ==
The main building of the Prins Hendrik Barracks, in particular the middle part with the dome tower, has influenced Dutch architecture, for example the design for the main post office in Maastricht by Marinus Jan Granpré Molière. It was probably also a source of inspiration for G.W. van Heukelom in his design for the Hoofdadministratie Building III (De Inktpot) of the Nederlandse Spoorwegen (Utrecht 1918) and for G.C. Bremer and J.R. Print in their competition design for the Lower House (The Hague 1920). The Nieuwe Badkapel in Scheveningen shows clear similarities such as the Dome Towers. The architect Willem Dudok, who started his career at the Military engineering, regarded the Prins Hendrik Barracks as a rational modern art expression in military architecture . The 'Canteen for civilian personnel' belongs to the Prins Hendrikkazerne and was built in 1910 and in the same style of rationalism as the barracks and the Military Hospital.

== Gallery ==
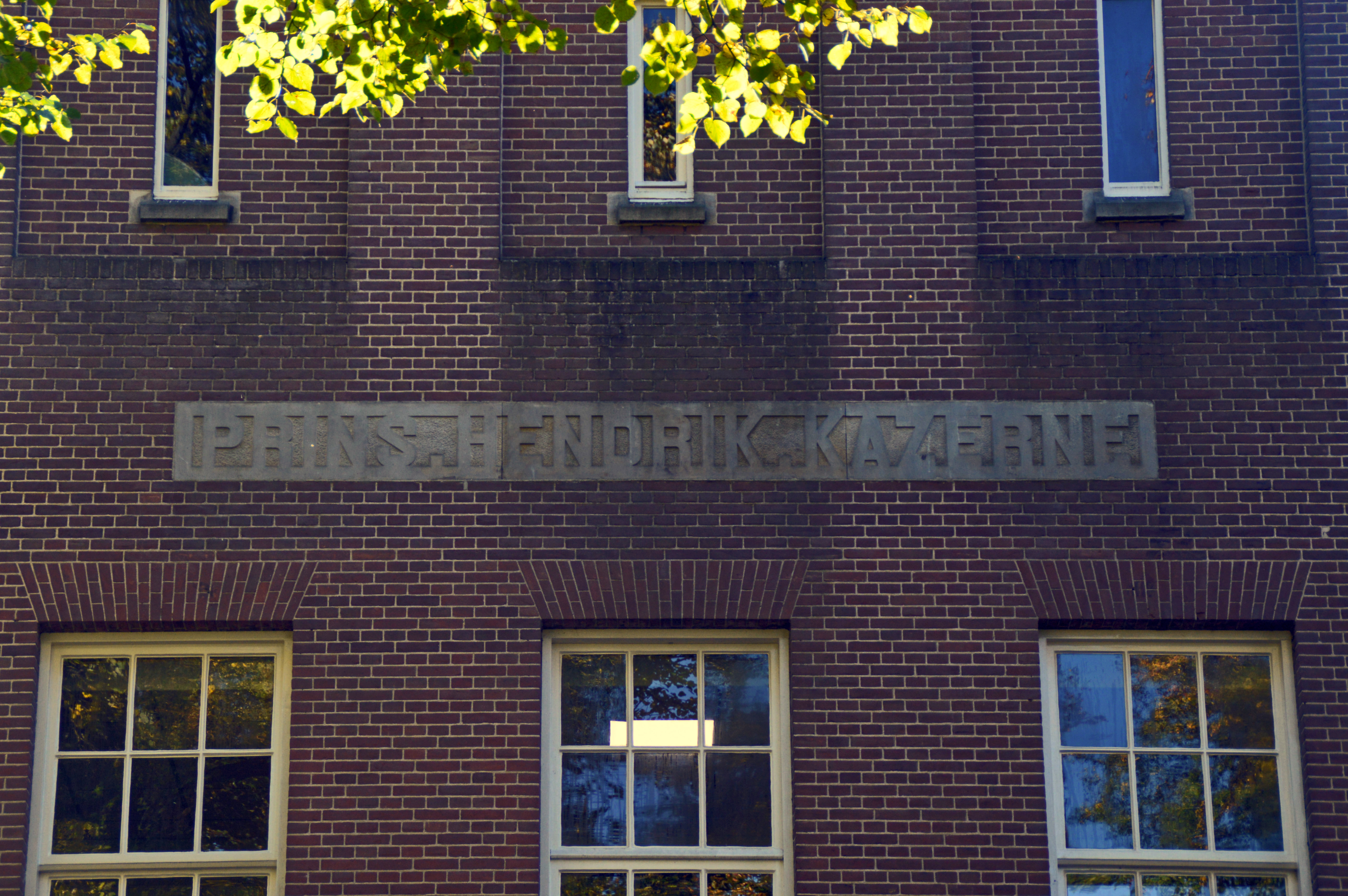
Facade with name

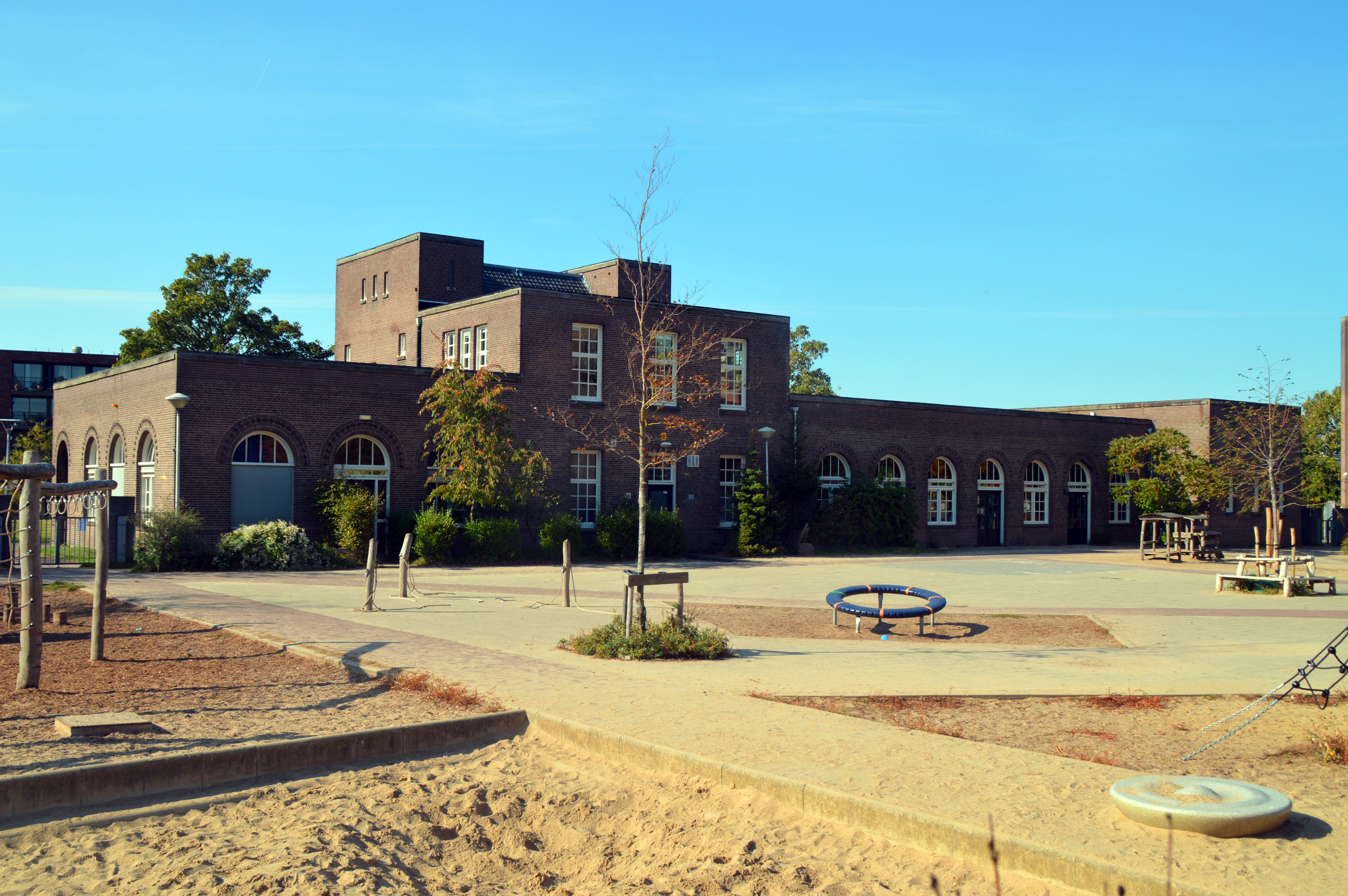
Former 'canteen for civilian personnel'

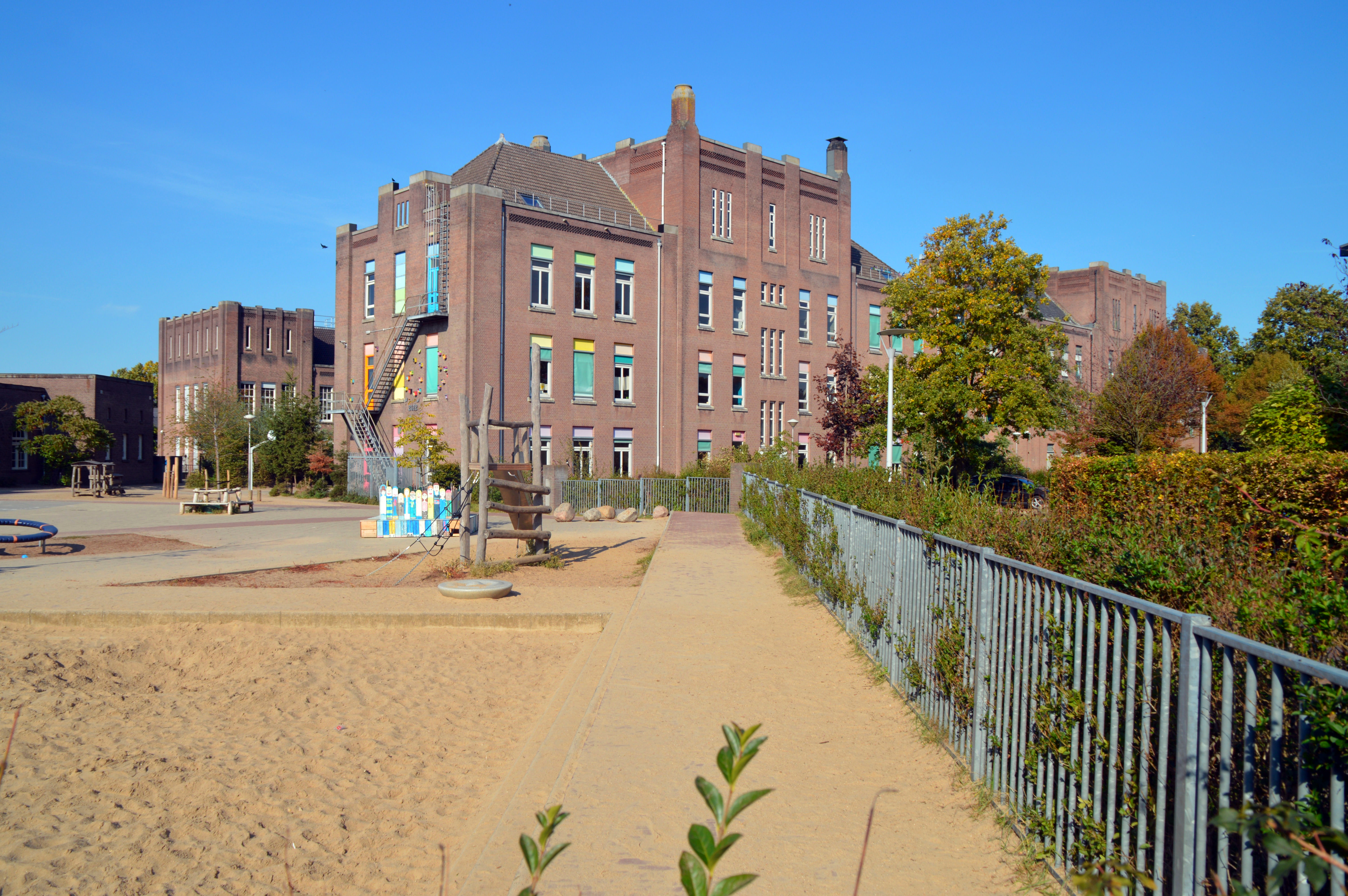
Former barracks building 2e Compagnie and on the right 4th Company

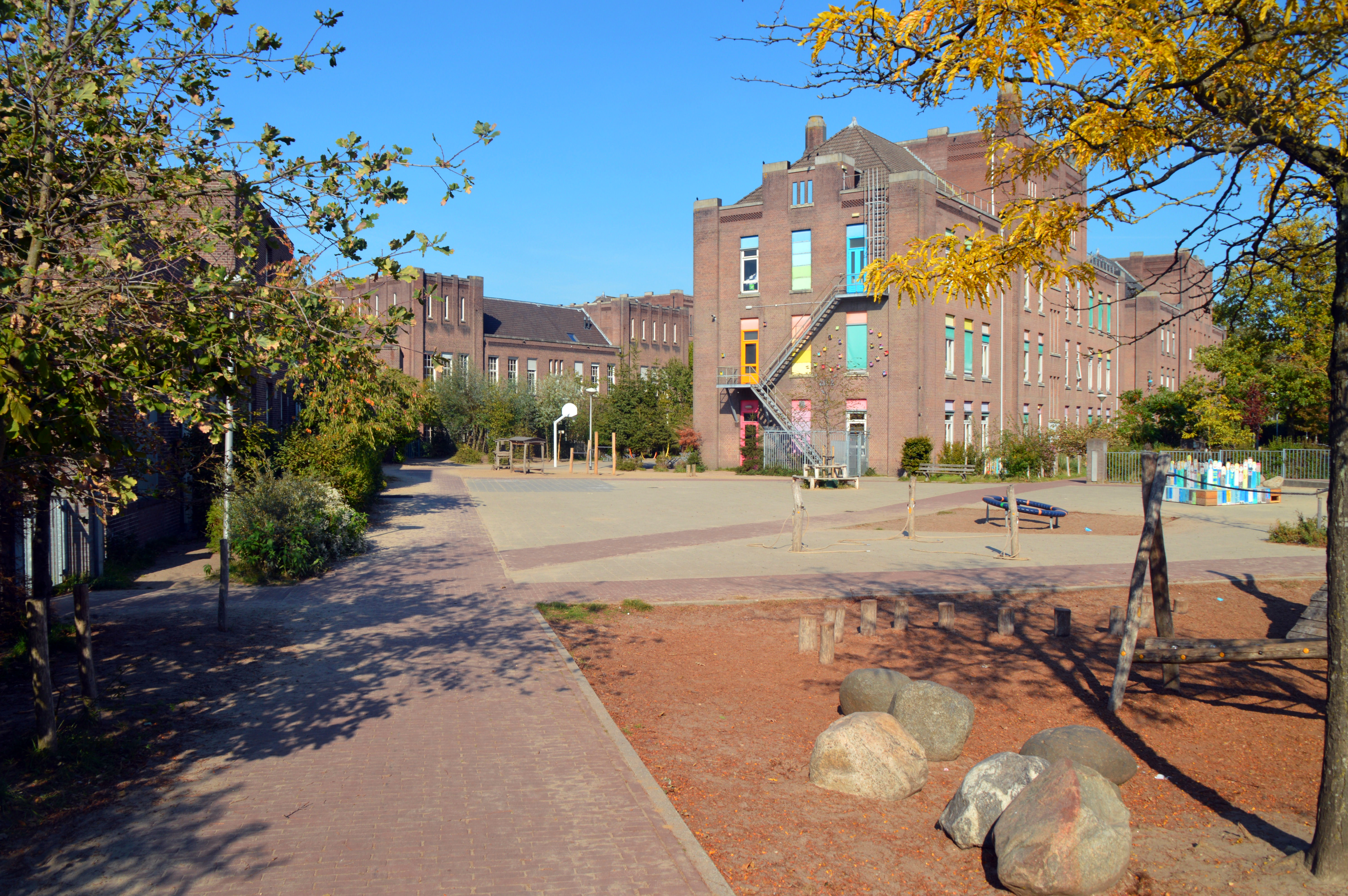
Former barracks building 2e Compagnie

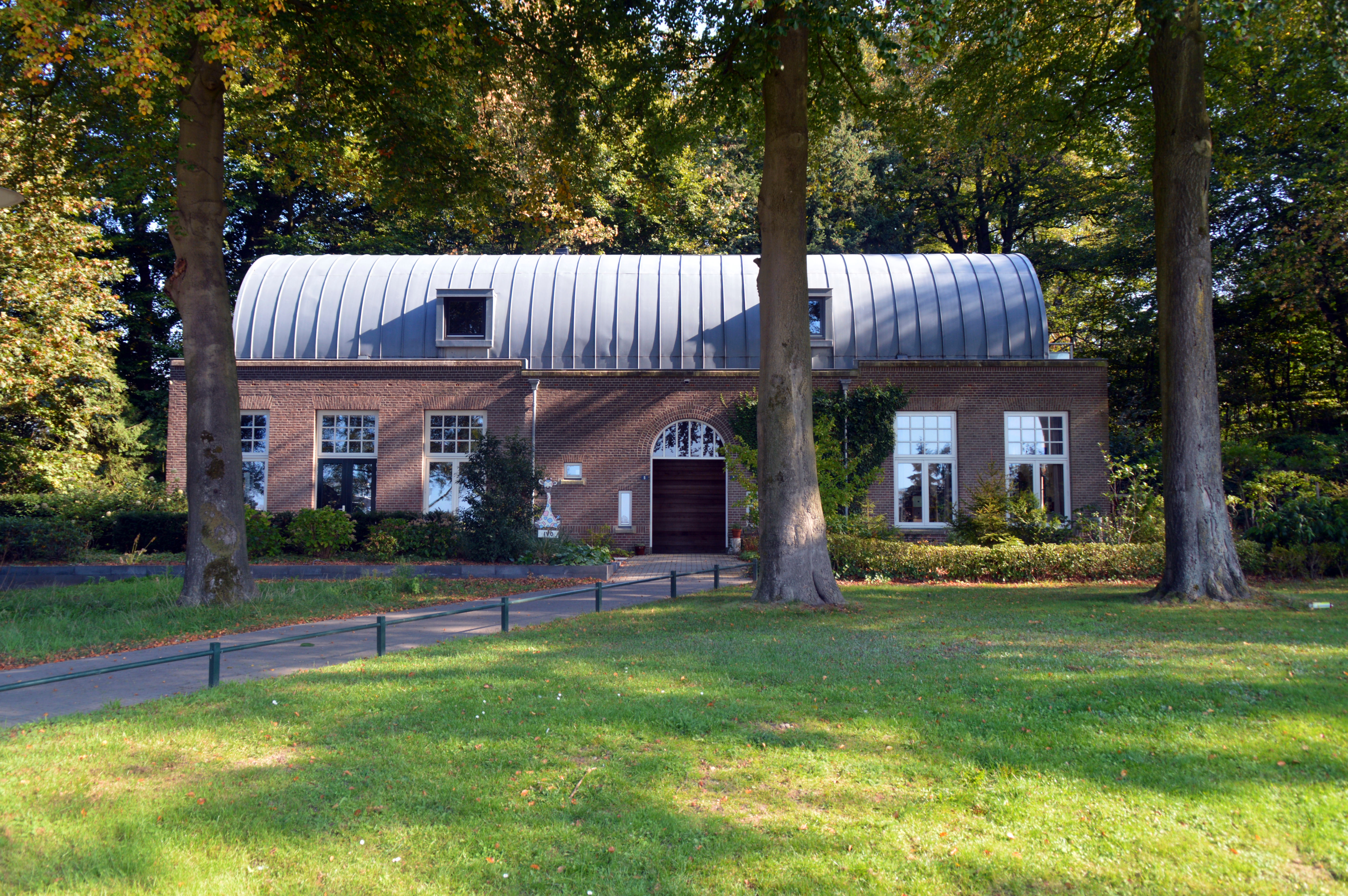
Former day care of the military hospital of the Prins Hendrikbarracks

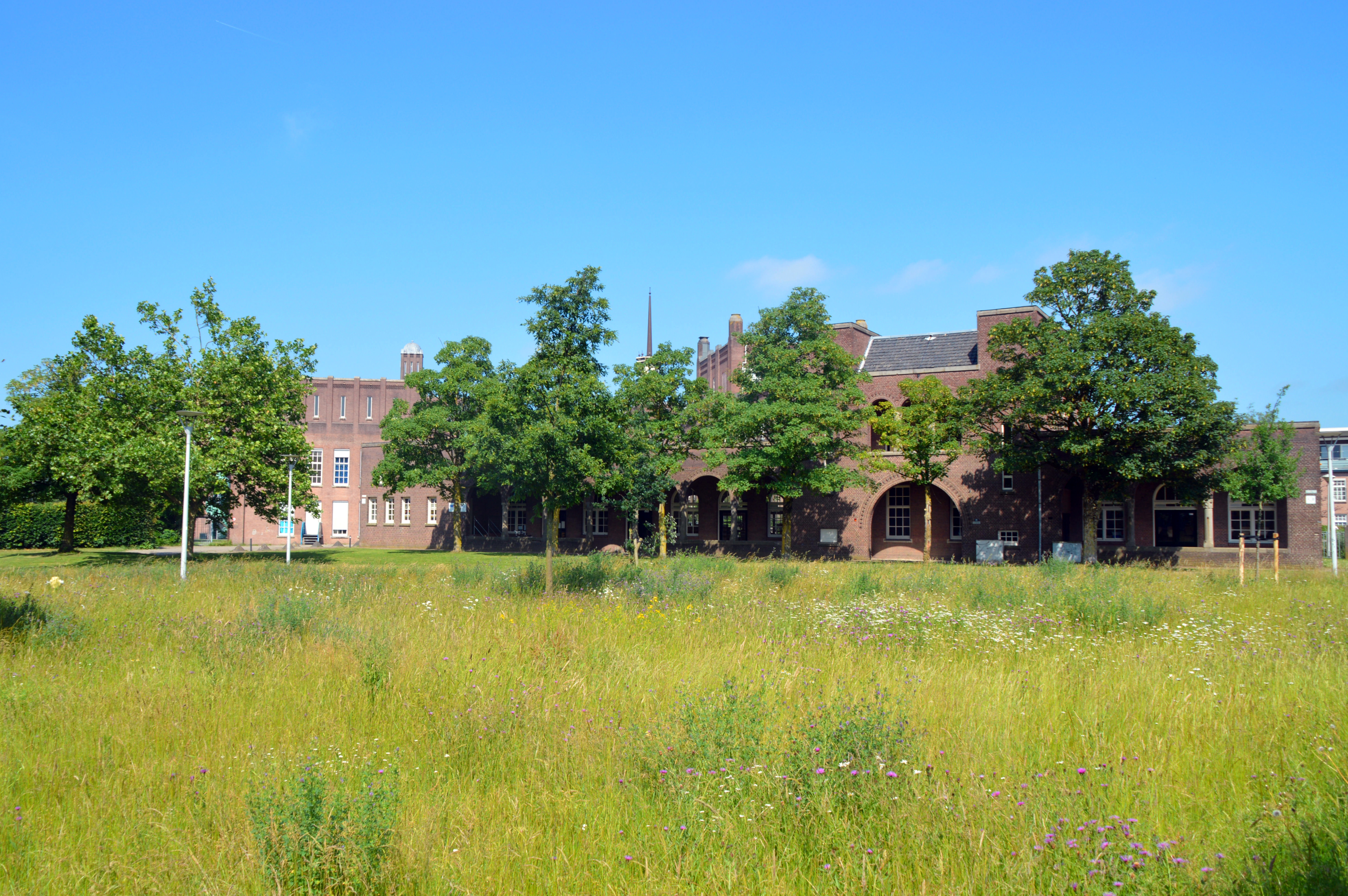
Former 'canteen for civilian personnel' seen from the Molenveld

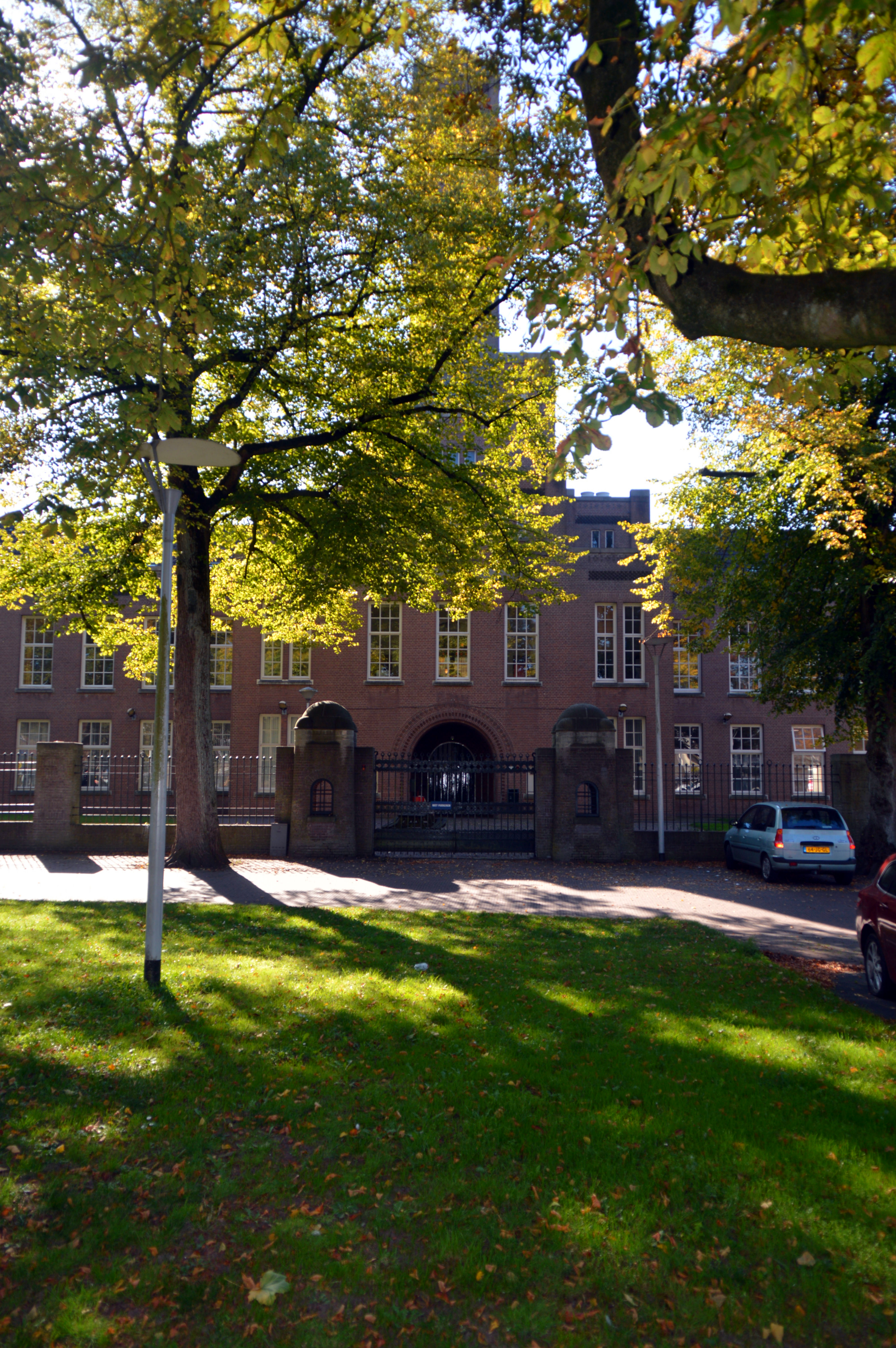
Frontbuilding

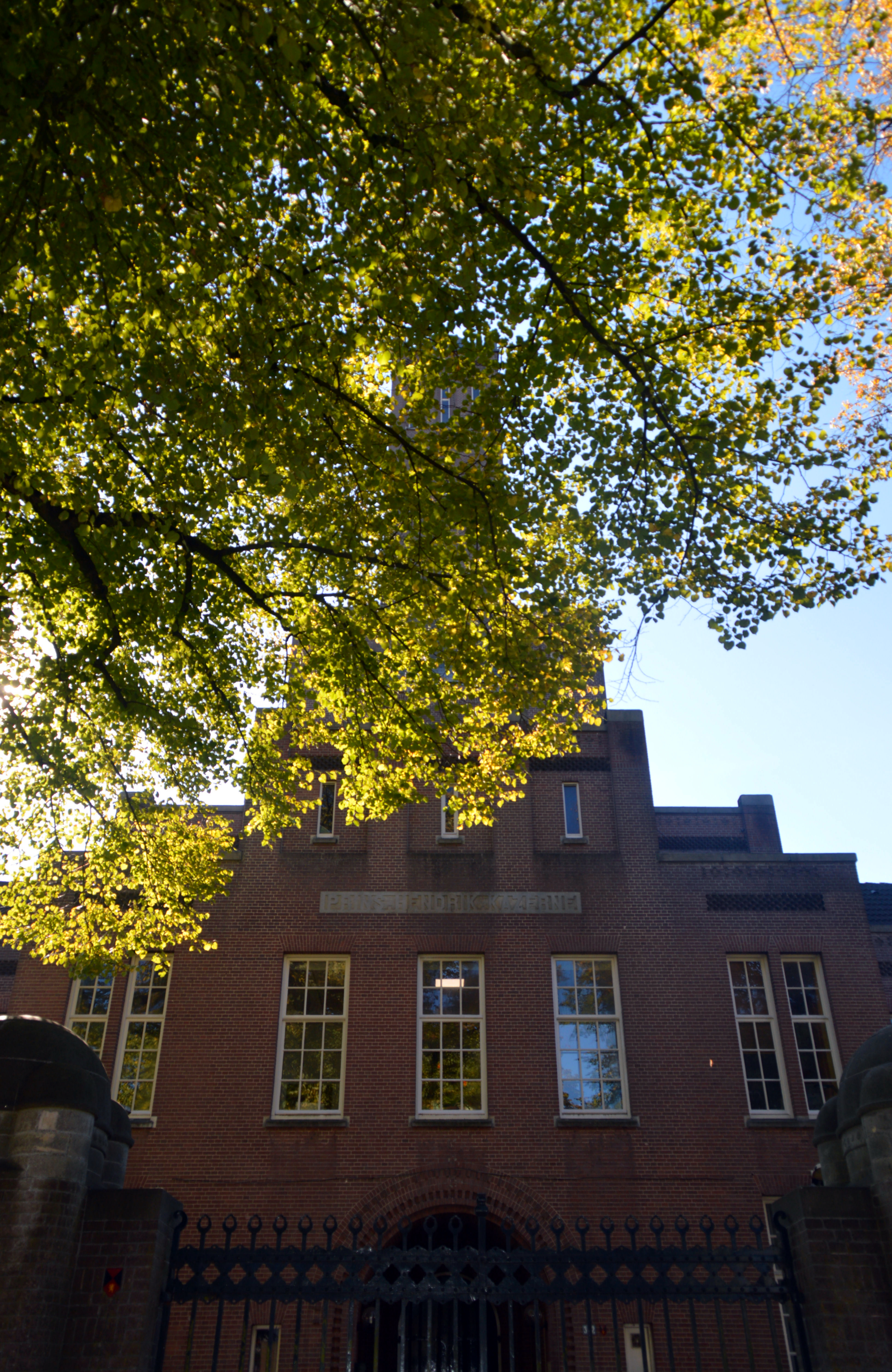
Dom of the frontbuilding
