= Richard Roelofsen =

Dutch footballer (born 1969)

Personal information
- Date of birth: 13 July 1969 (age 57)
- Place of birth: Harderwijk, Netherlands
- Height: 1.85 m (6 ft 1 in)
- Position: Striker

Youth career
- VVOG

Senior career*
Years	Team	Apps	(Gls)
1988–1990	PEC Zwolle	72	(18)
1990–1993	Vitesse	33	(3)
1993–1995	MVV	62	(31)
1995–1997	Roda JC	42	(10)
1997–1998	NAC Breda	34	(4)
1998–2000	De Graafschap	29	(3)
2000	Heracles Almelo	17	(3)
2000–2003	PEC Zwolle	92	(33)
2003–2005	Heracles Almelo	47	(8)
2005–2006	De Graafschap	20	(2)
Total		448	(112)

Managerial career
- 2012: De Graafschap (caretaker)
- 2023: De Graafschap (caretaker)
- * Club domestic league appearances and goals

Richard Roelofsen (born 13 July 1969) is a Dutch former professional footballer who played as a striker.

== Career ==
Roelofsen started his professional career in the 1988–89 season as part of PEC Zwolle. He since also appeared for Vitesse, MVV, Roda JC, NAC Breda, De Graafschap and Heracles Almelo. He announced his retirement from football in 2006.

On 20 February 2012, Roelofsen was appointed caretaker manager of De Graafschap after the resignation of former head coach Andries Ulderink. Roelofsen and De Graafschap since agreed on a contract extension for four seasons as of 1 July 2012, with him fully focusing on his job as assistant coach, with an extra focus on the personal development plans of players at De Graafschap.

== Personal life ==
His nephew Marco Roelofsen also played football on the highest level in the Netherlands.

== Honours ==
Zwolle

- Eerste Divisie: 2001–02

Heracles Almelo

- Eerste Divisie: 2004–05
