= Harderwijk =

Harderwijk Harderwiek (Veluws)
- Municipality
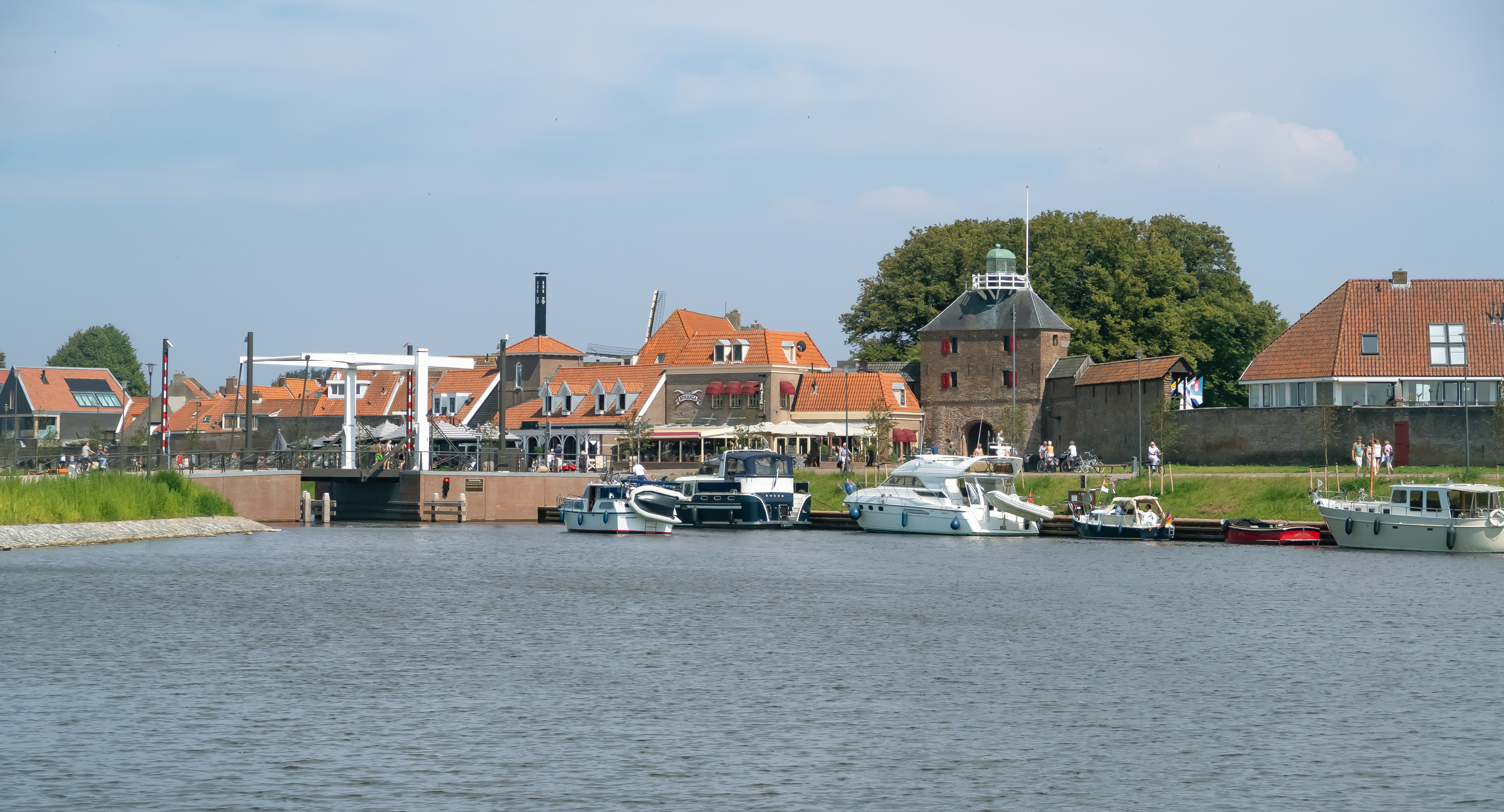
- Harderwijk, view to the town from het Zeepad

- Flag Coat of arms

- Location in Gelderland

- Location within the Netherlands Location within Europe
- Coordinates: 52°21′N 5°37′E
- Country: Netherlands
- Province: Gelderland

Government
  - Body: Municipal council
  - Mayor: Jeroen Joon

Area
  - Total: 48.27 km^{2} (18.64 sq mi)
  - Land: 38.89 km^{2} (15.02 sq mi)
  - Water: 9.38 km^{2} (3.62 sq mi)
- Elevation: 3 m (9.8 ft)

Population (January 2021)
  - Total: 48,726
  - Density: 1,253/km^{2} (3,250/sq mi)
- Demonym: Harderwijker
- Time zone: UTC+1 (CET)
  - Summer (DST): UTC+2 (CEST)
- Postcode: 3840–3849
- Area code: 0341
- Website: www.harderwijk.nl

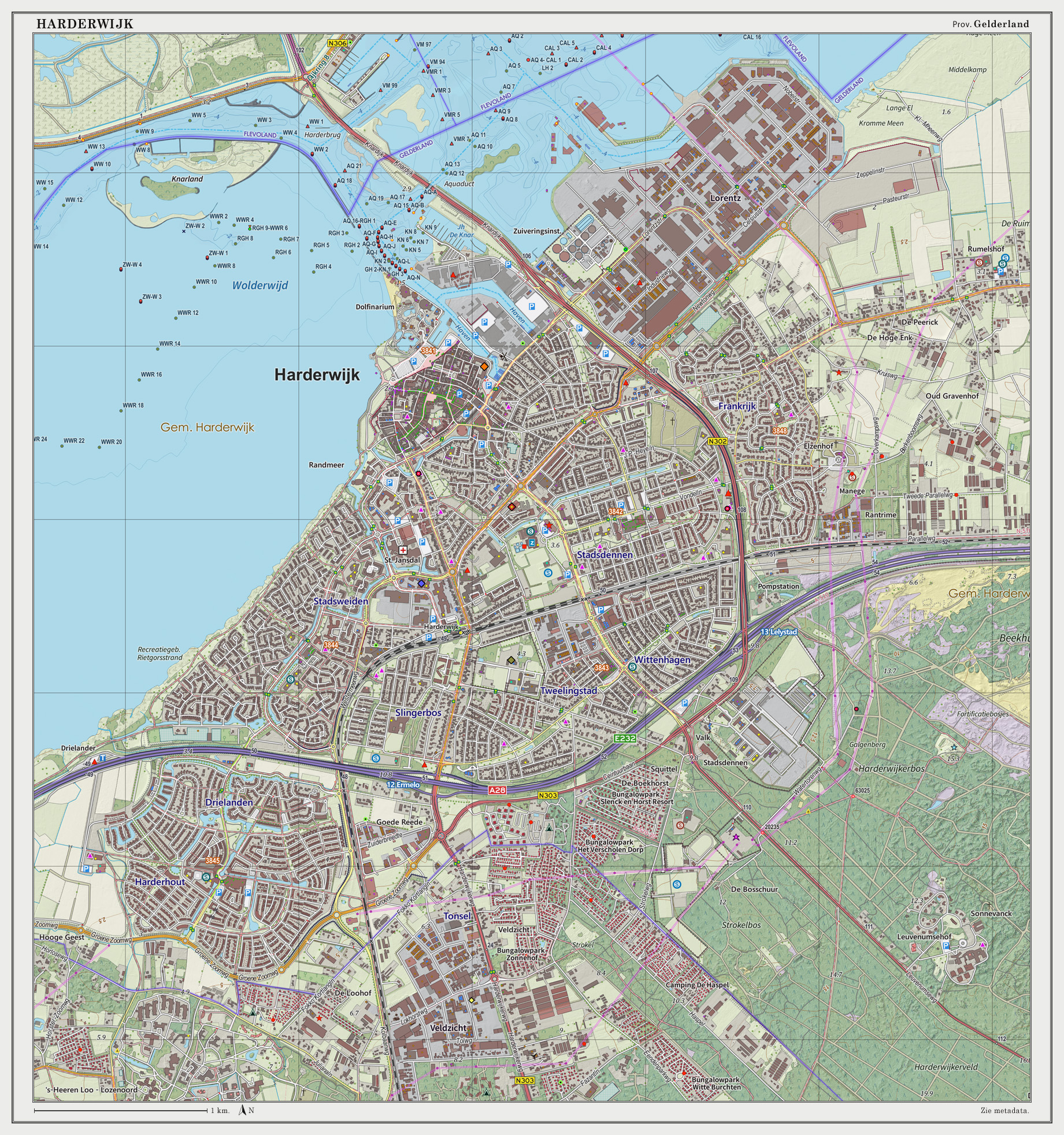
Dutch Topographic map of Harderwijk (town), March 2014

Harderwijk (Dutch pronunciation: [ˌɦɑrdərˈʋɛik]; Dutch Low Saxon: Harderwiek) is a municipality and city of the Netherlands. It is served by the Harderwijk railway station. Its population centres are Harderwijk and Hierden. Harderwijk is on the western boundary of the Veluwe. The southeastern half of the municipality is largely forests.

== History ==
Harderwijk received city rights from Count Otto II of Guelders in 1231. A defensive wall surrounding the city was completed by the end of that century. The oldest part of the city is near where the streets Hoogstraat and Grote Poortstraat now are. Around 1315 the city was expanded southwards, which included the construction of what is now called the Grote Kerk (Great Church). A second, northward expansion took place around 1425.

Particularly along the west side of town, much of the wall still exists but often not in entirely original form. That also goes for the only remaining city gate, the Vischpoort (Fish Gate).

Between 1648 and 1811, the University of Harderwijk operated in the city. The Swedish botanist, physician and zoologist, Carl Linnaeus graduated at this university. The university, together with the universities of Zutphen and Franeker, was abolished by Napoleon.

Harderwijk was a member of the Hanseatic League. It lies on what used to be the Zuiderzee shore (Southern Sea, now the IJsselmeer) and consequently its economy was strongly based on fishing and seafaring in general. That dramatically changed after 1932, when the Zuiderzee was cut off from the North Sea for safety reasons. Few fishing boats thus now remain in the harbour, which now is home mainly to yachts. An annual event illustrating the former importance of the fishing industry to Harderwijk is Aaltjesdag, which translates to Eel day. Fish can still be bought at stands and restaurants on the boulevard throughout the year except for the winter months. Tourists are common customers, but local people no longer make their living from the fisheries.

Today, Harderwijk is probably known best for the Dolfinarium Harderwijk, a marine mammal park where dolphin shows are held and various other marine mammals and fish are kept.

== Notable residents ==
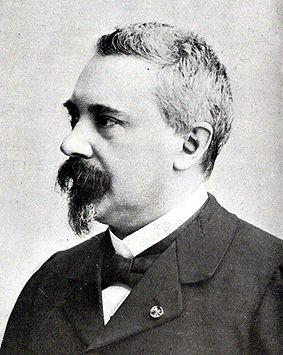
Theo de Meester

- Henriëtte van der Meij (1850-1945) early Dutch feminist and journalist
- Theo de Meester (1851–1919), politician and Prime Minister 1905-1908
- Johan Mekkes (1898–1987) a Dutch reformational philosopher
- Dirk Rijnders (1909–2006), politician
- A. H. J. Prins (1921–2000) a Dutch Africanist and maritime anthropologist
- Herman Bouma (born 1934) a Dutch vision researcher and gerontechnologist
- Henk Schiffmacher (1952), a Dutch tattoo artist
- Harry van den Brink (born 1961) commander of the Royal Marechaussee
- Roef Ragas (1965–2007), actor
- Joost Eerdmans (1971), TV host & politician
- Volkert van der Graaf (1969), lived in Harderwijk at the time of the Assassination of Pim Fortuyn

=== Sport ===
- Marco Roelofsen (1968), football midfielder
- Richard Roelofsen (1969), football striker, with over 430 club caps
- Henk Timmer (1971), football goalkeeper with 522 club caps
- Liesbeth Migchelsen (born 1971), footballer, played for the Netherlands women's national football team 95 times
- Marianne Timmer (1974), speedskater, twice gold medallist at the 1998 Winter Olympics
- Jan Bos (1975), speedskater, twice silver medallist at the 1998 and 2002 Winter Olympics
- Monique Jansen (born 1978), discus thrower, competed at the 2012 Summer Olympics
- Chiel Warners (born 1978), decathlete
- Theo Bos (1983), cyclist, silver medallist at the 2004 Summer Olympics
- Annemarie Worst (born 1995), mountain-bike and cyclo-cross cyclist
- Lisa Kruger (born 2000), paralympic swimmer

== Gallery ==
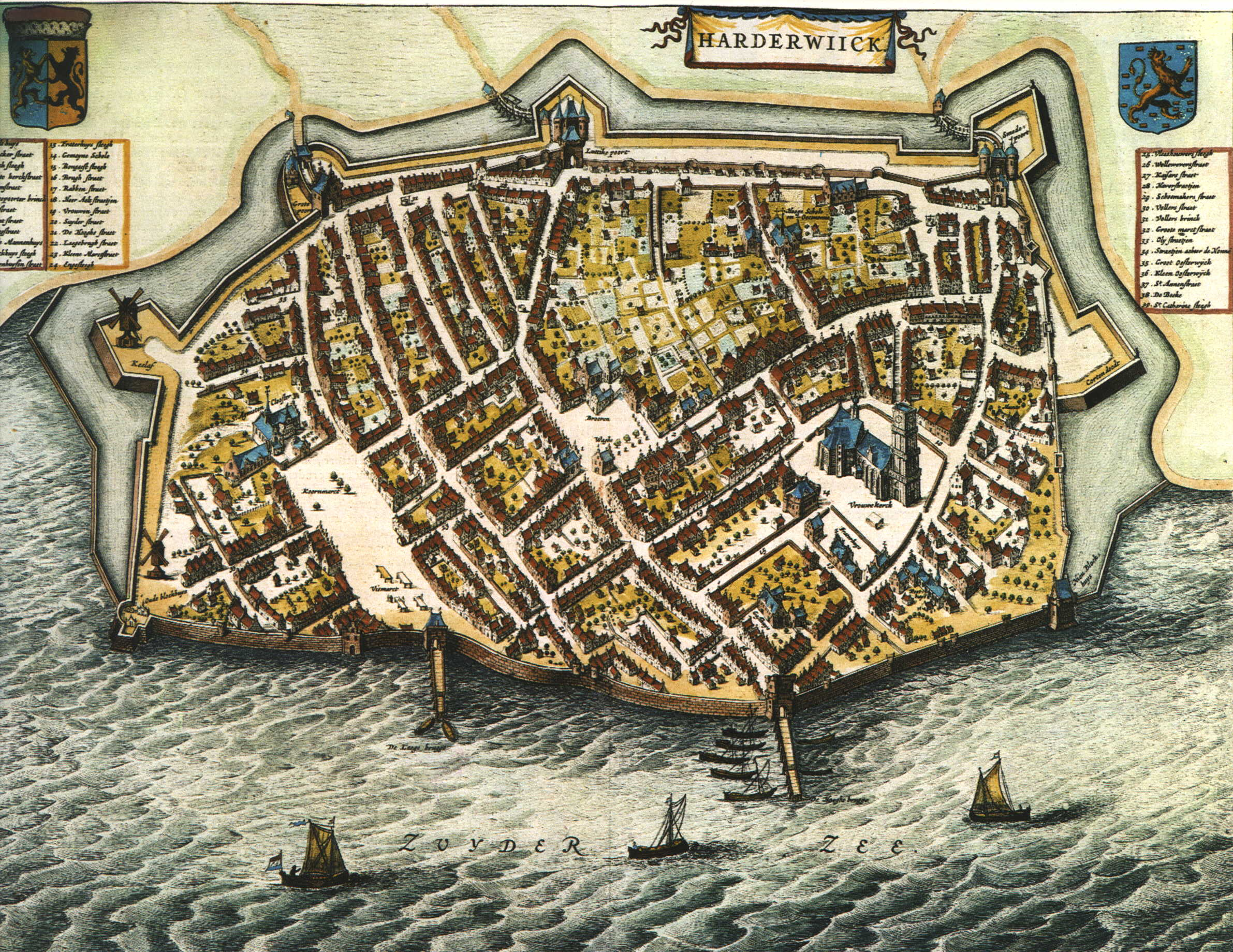
Map of Harderwijk (Blaeu's Toonneel der Steden), by Willem and Joan Blaeu, 1652. Note that north is at the bottom of the map.

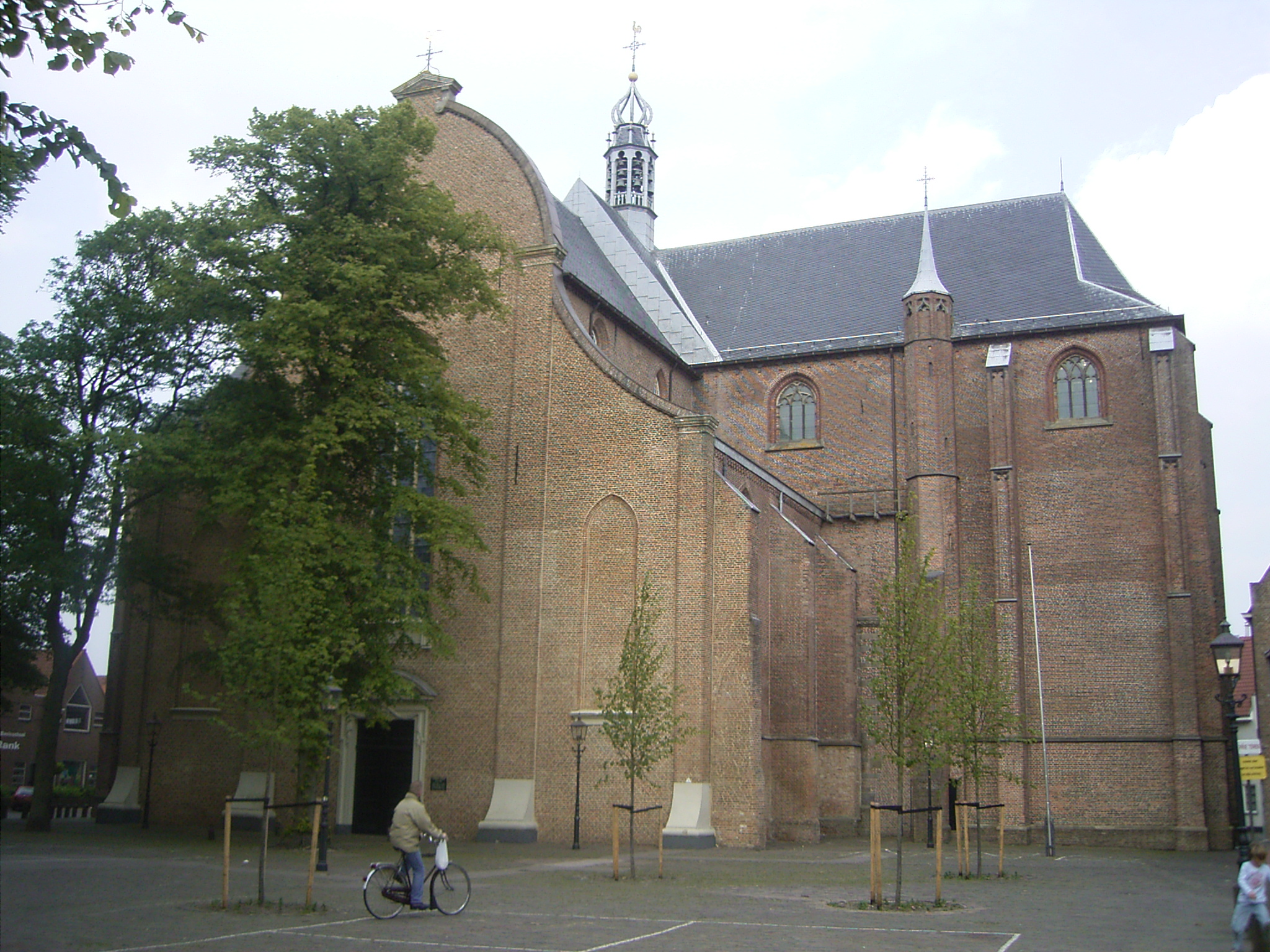
Harderwijk, church: de Grote Kerk

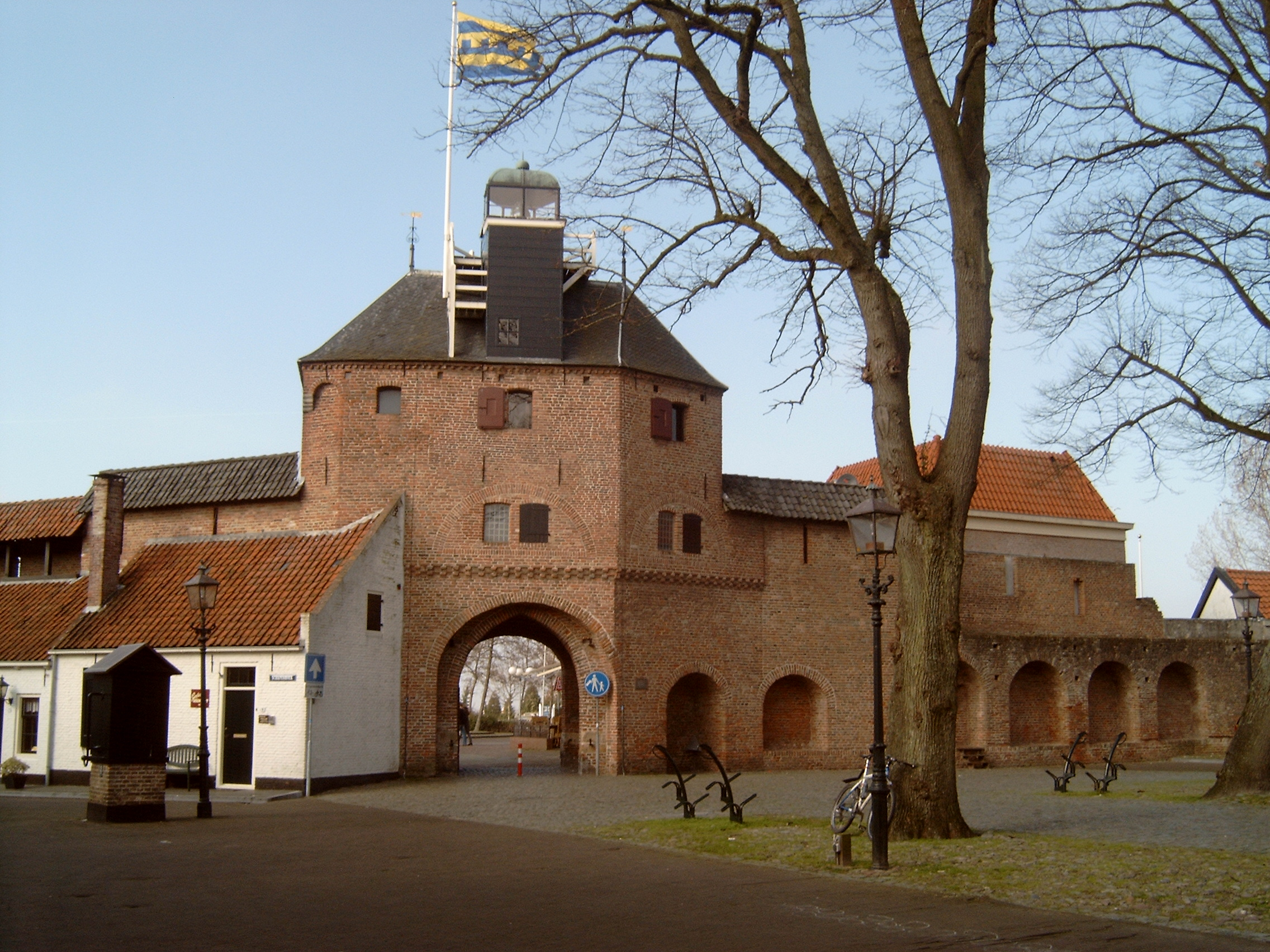
Harderwijk, gate: de Vischpoort

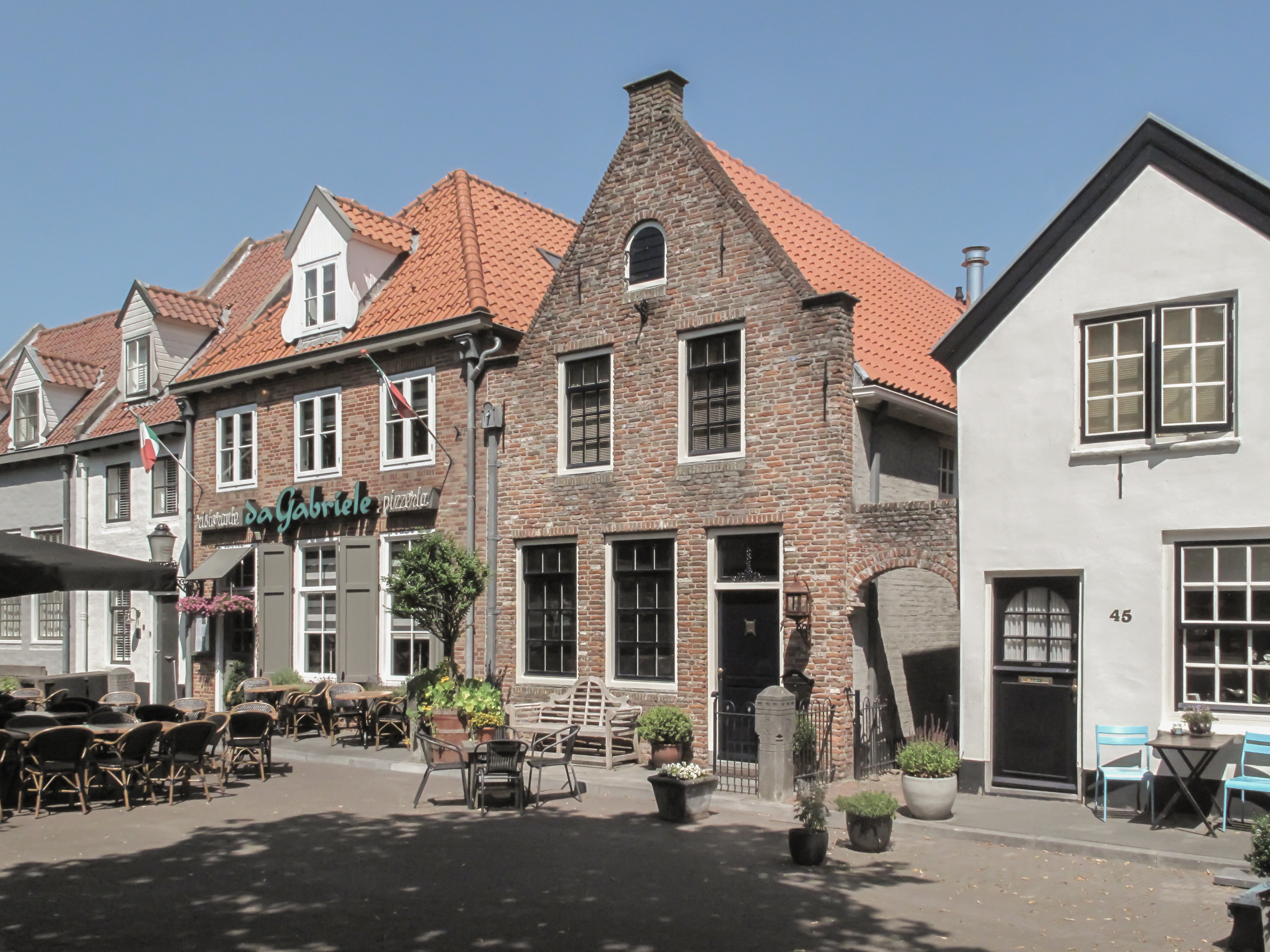
Harderwijk, view of a street: de Vischmarkt (Fish Market)

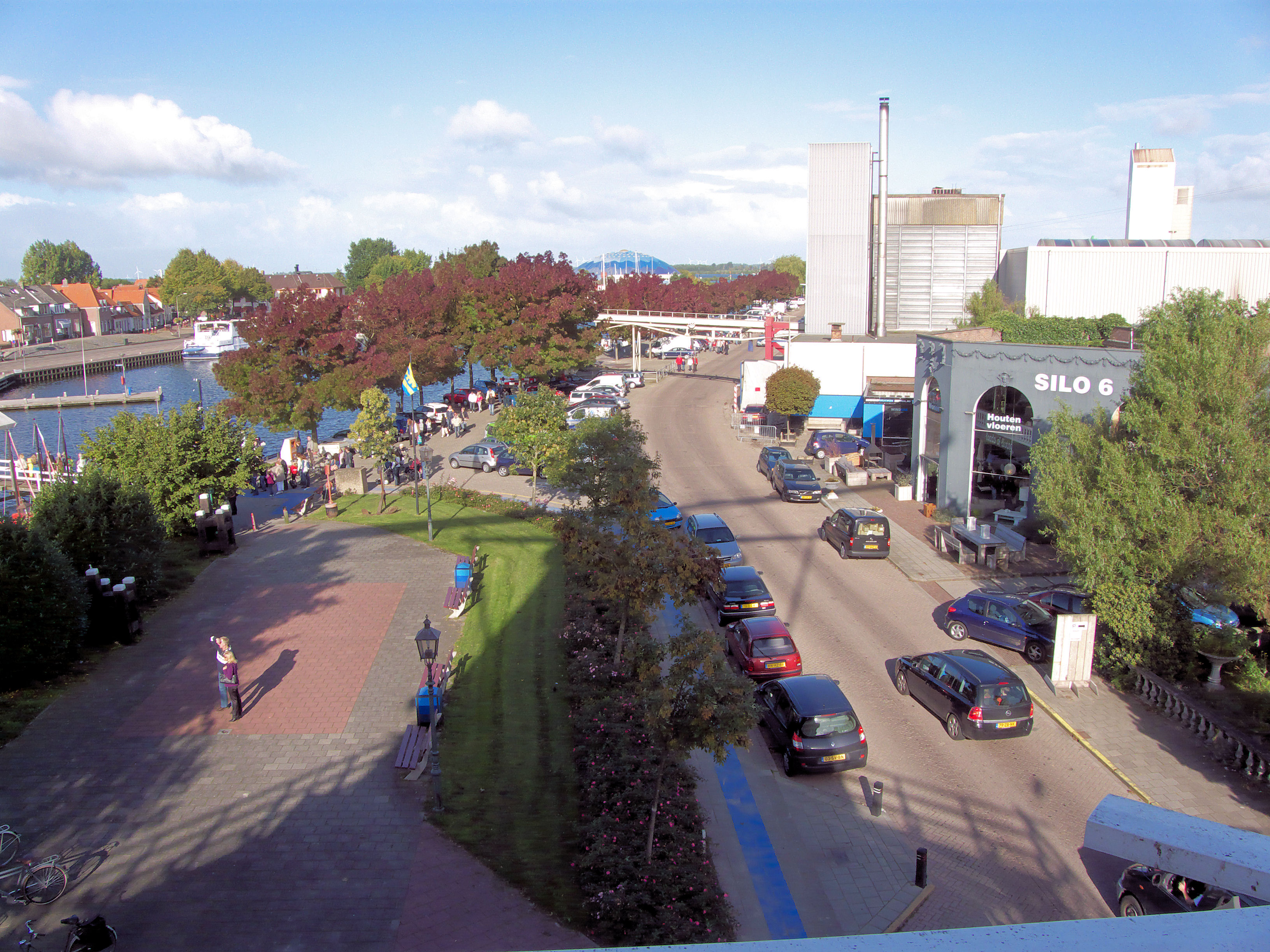
Harderwijk, Harbour of Harderwijk seen from windmill De Hoop

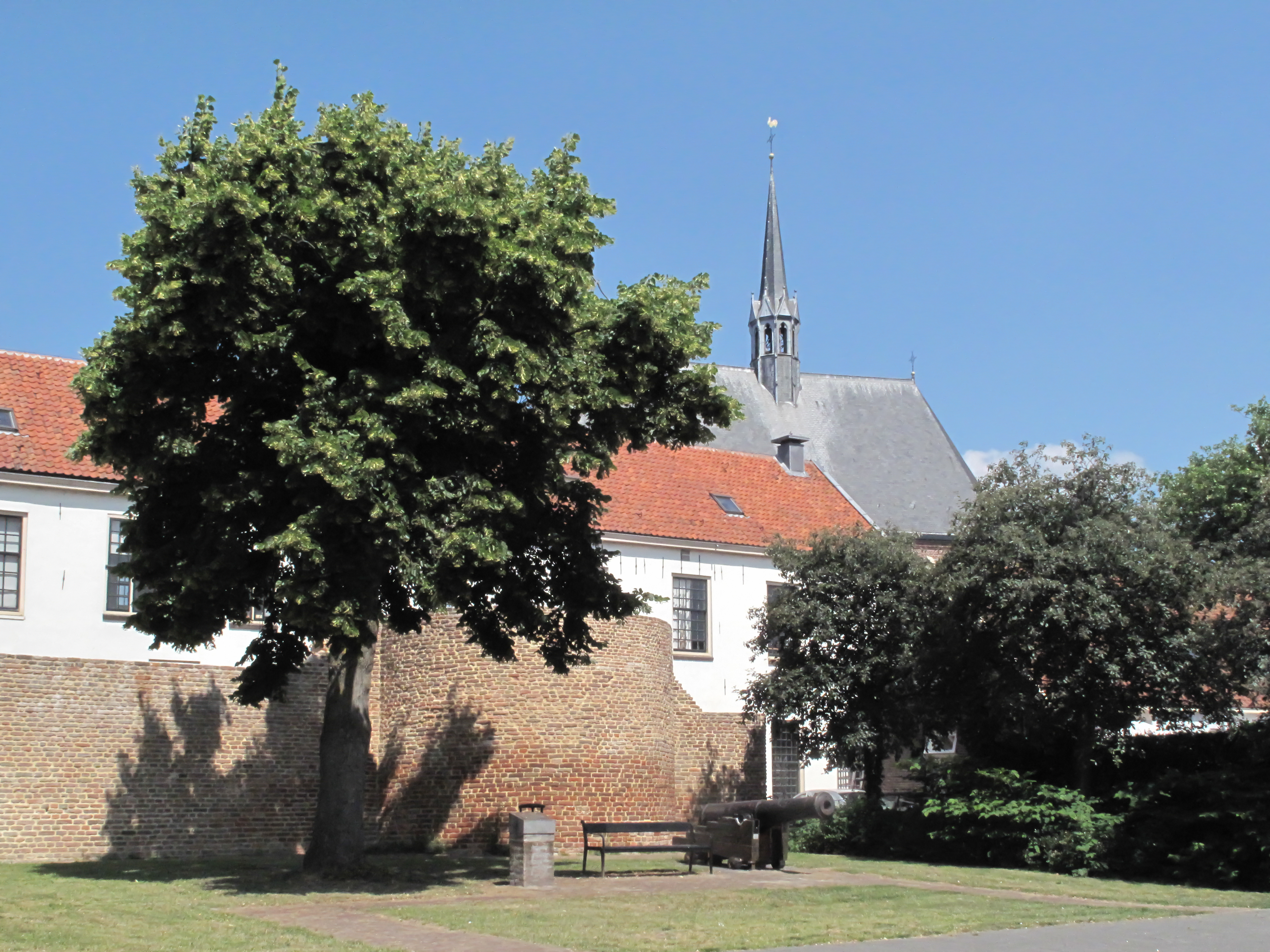
Harderwijk, defensive wall, cannon and church tower

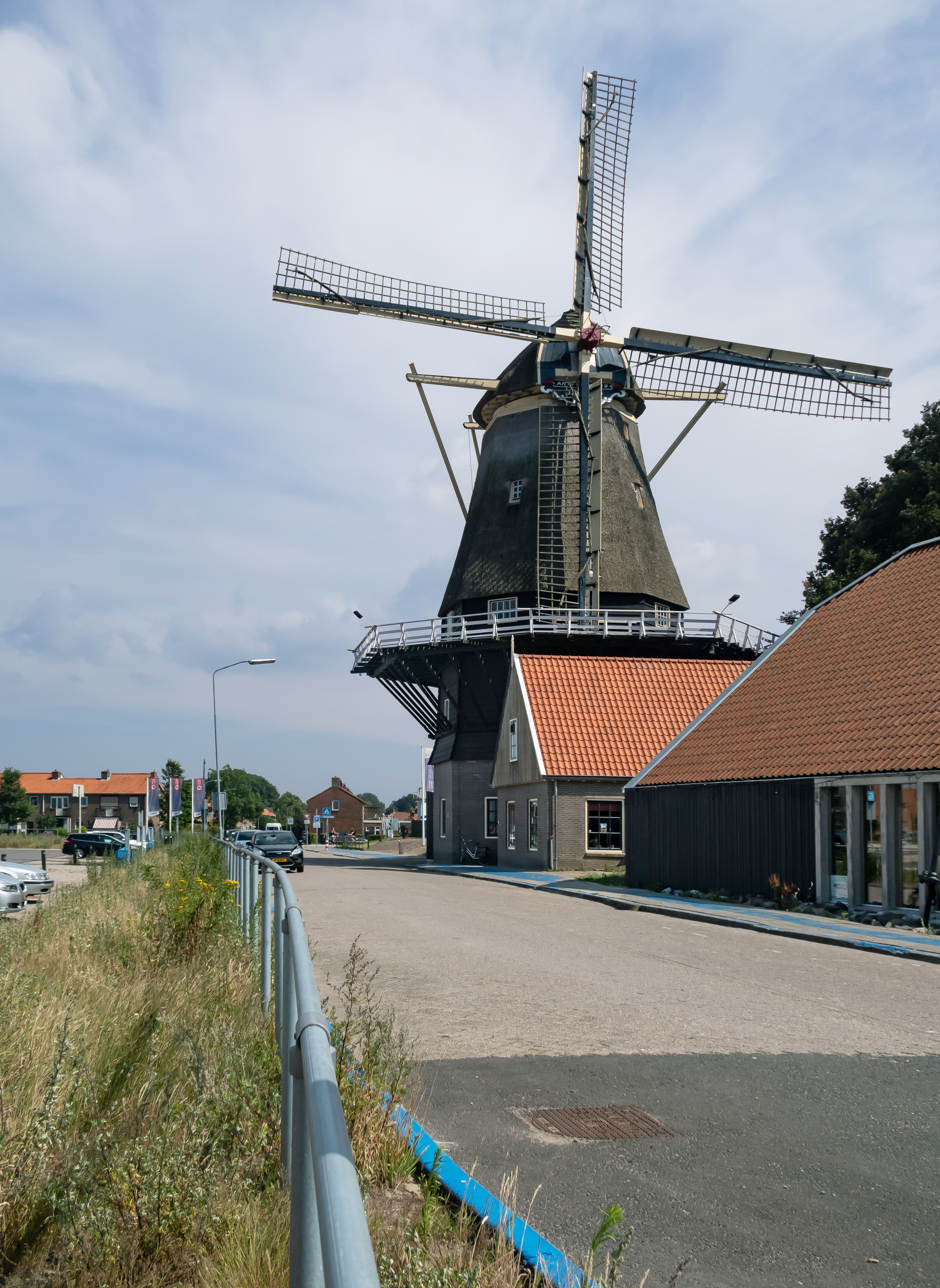
Harderwijk, windmill

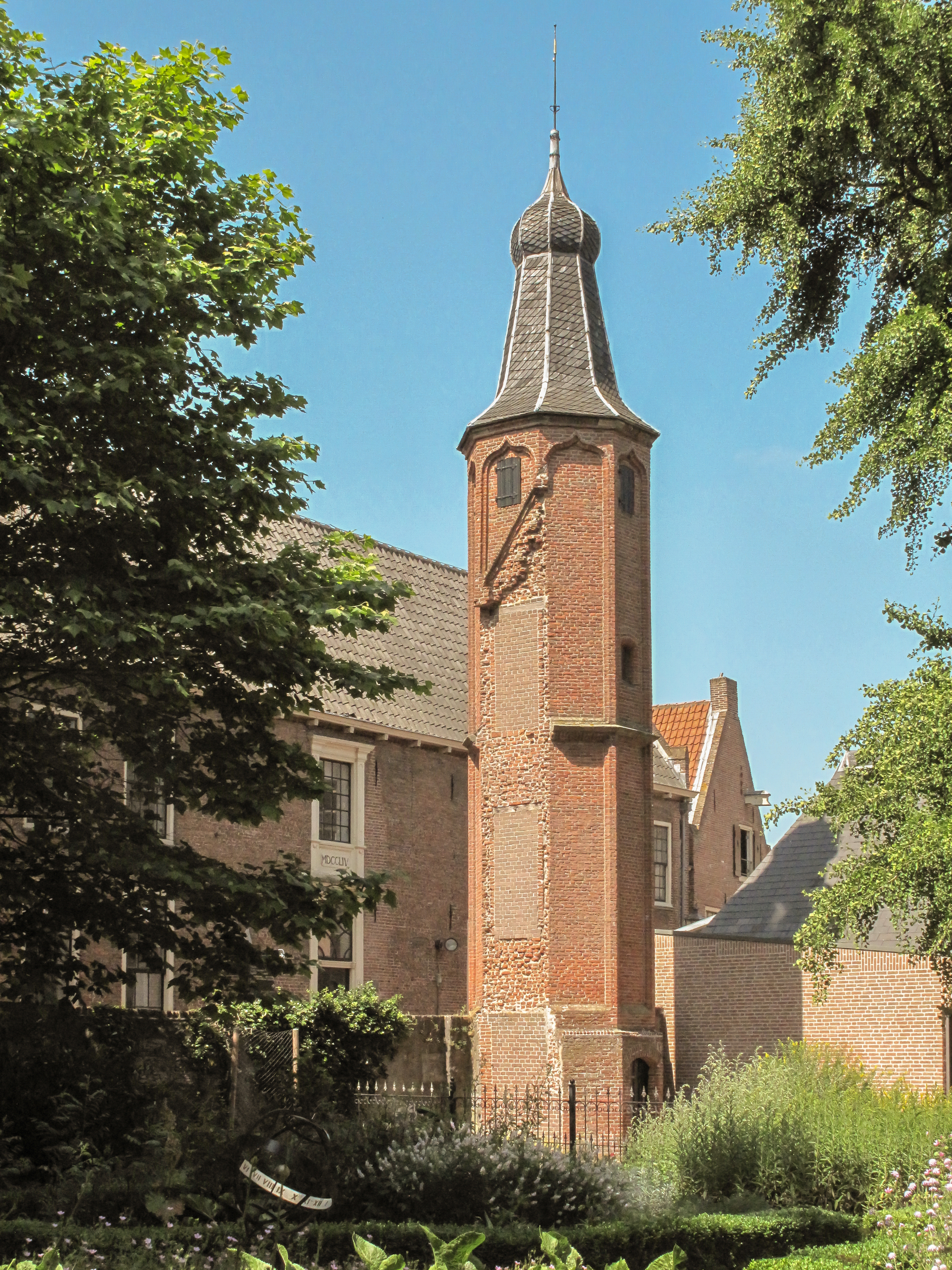
Harderwijk: het Linnaeustorentje (the Linnaeus tower)
