= Emilio Del Giudice =

Italian scientist

Emilio del Giudice
- Born: 1 January 1940; Naples, Italy
- Died: 31 January 2014 (aged 74); Milan, Italy
- Citizenship: Italian
- Known for: Del Giudice, Di Vecchia, Fubini Model DDF Model
- Awards: Prigogine Medal
- Scientific career
- Fields: Nuclear physics, condensed matter, QED
- Workplaces: INFN

Emilio Del Giudice (1 January 1940 – 31 January 2014) was an Italian theoretical physicist who worked in the field of condensed matter. Pioneer of string theory in the early 1970s, later on he became better known for his work with Giuliano Preparata at the Italian Institute for Nuclear Physics (INFN).

== Biography ==
During the 1970s, along with Sergio Fubini, Paolo Di Vecchia and Gabriele Veneziano, Del Giudice was at the centre of an active school of theoretical physicists with close connections to Italy (with one of the Italian INFN and MIT financed "Bruno Rossi" exchange programs). He and his co-workers did fundamental work in string theory.

For many years he was involved in quantum field theory and its relations with the physics of collective, coherent processes. He pioneered the quantum field theory of soft matter, focusing mainly on the structure of liquid water; in the latter part of his life, he also investigated, together with Luc Montagnier, the relation between water and living matter. He is among the authors of the seminal work on the Oxhydroelectric effect.

He worked at Niels Bohr Institute, Copenhagen and later became a member of the International Institute of Biophotonics, Neuss, Germany.

== Awards ==
Professor Del Giudice was awarded the Prigogine Medal in 2009. On that occasion, he delivered a plenary lecture entitled "The interplay of Quantum Field Theory and Thermodynamics of Irreversible Processes as a conceptual basis for Biology and Ecosystem Dynamics".

== Books ==
The Secret of the Three Bullets: How New Nuclear Weapons Are Back on Battlefields with Maurizio Torrealta (2010)

== Publications ==
Scopus, h-index 21

- 1964 Photofission of Bi, W and Ag from 300 to 1000 Mev De Carvalho, Cortini, Del Giudice, Potenza, Rinzivillo, Ghigo, Nuovo Cimento II 32, (1964), 293-297;
- 1965 On singular potential scattering I Del Giudice, Galzenati, Nuovo Cimento, 38, 435-458; 40A 739-747;
- 1967 Dispersive sum rules and low-energy limits Del Giudice, Galzenati, Nuovo Cimento, 52A (1967) 606-616;
- 1969 Nonstrong amplitudes in a Veneziano-type model Ademollo, Del Giudice, Nuovo Cimento 63A (1969) 639-656;
- 1969 A simplified dual model for Lepton-hadron sattering Ademollo, Del Giudice, Lettere a1 Nuovo Cimento 2 (1969) 345-350;
- 1970 Dual models, Pomeranchuk term and crossing symmetry Del Giudice, Gabriele Veneziano, Lettere a1 Nuovo Cimento 3 (1970) 363-368;
- 1970 Characterization of the physical states in dual resonance models Del Giudice, Di Vecchia, Nuovo Cimento 70A, (1970) 579-591;
- 1971 Factorization and operator formalism in the generalized Virasoro Model Del Giudice, Di Vecchia, Nuovo Cimento 5A (1971) 90-102;
- 1972 General properties of the dual resonance model Del Giudice, Paolo Di Vecchia, Fubini, Annals of Physics 70, (1972) 378-398;
- 1972 Light cone physics and duality, Emilio Del Giudice, Paolo Di Vecchia, Sergio Fubini, Musto, Nuovo Cimento 12A (1972) 813-862;
- 1974 Couplings of three excited particles in the dual resonance model Del Giudice, Di Vecchia, Fubini, Nuovo Cimento 19A (1974) 181-203;
- 1976 Supersymmetric strings and colour confinement Ademollo, Brink, D’Adda, D’Auria, Napolitano, Sciuto, Del Giudice, Di Vecchia, Ferrara, Gliozzi, Musto, Pettorino, Phys. Letters 62B (1976) 105-110;
- 1976 Dual String with colour symmetry Ademollo, Brink, D’Adda, D’Auria, Napolitano, Sciuto, Del Giudice, Di Vecchia, Ferrara, Gliozzi, Musto, Pettorino, Schwarz, Nucl. Phys. B111 (1976) 77-110;
- 1976 Dual string models with non -abelian colour flavour symmetries Ademollo, Brink, D’Adda, D’Auria, Napolitano, Sciuto, Del Giudice, Di Vecchia, Ferrara, Ghiozzi, Musto, Pettorino, Nucl. Phys., B114 (1976) 297-316;
- 1981 Solitons in Biological Systems at Low Temperature, Del Giudice, Doglia, Milani, Physica Scripta 23 (1981) 307-310;
- 1981 Nonlinear Properties of Coherent Electric Vibrations in Living Cells, Del Giudice, Doglia, Milani, Physics Letters 85A (1981) 402-404;
- 1982 A Collective Dynamics in Metabolically Active Cells, Del Giudice, Doglia, Milani, Physica Scripta 26 (1982) 232 -238;
- 1982 Self-Focusing of Fröhlich waves and cytoskeleton dynamics Del Giudice, Doglia, Milani, Physics Letters 90A (1982) 104-106;
- 1982 A time consistent feature seen in the Raman spectra of metabolically active cells, Del Giudice, Doglia, Milani, Webb, Physics Letters 91A, (1982) 257-259;
- 1983 Spontaneous Symmetry Breakdown and Boson Condensation in Biology, Del Giudice, Doglia, Milani, Vitello, Physics Letters 95A (1983) 508-510;
- 1984 Raman spectroscopy and Order in Biological Systems, Del Giudice, Doglia, Milani, Fontana, Cell Biophysics 6 (1984) 117-129;
- 1984 A quantum field theoretical approach to the collective behaviour of biological systems, Del Giudice, Doglia, Milani, Vitiello, Nuclear Physics B251 [FS 13] (1985) 375-400;
- 1985 Presence of lines in Raman spectra of living cells, Del Giudice, Doglia, Milani, Smith, Webb, Physics Letters 107A (1985) 98-100;
- 1985 Rouleau Formation of Erythrocytes: a Dynamical Model Del Giudice, Doglia, Milani, Journal of Biological Physics 13 (1985) 57-68;
- 1986 Electromagnetic field and spontaneous symmetry breaking in biological matter, Del Giudice, Doglia, Milani, Vitiello, Nuclear Physics B275 [FS 17] (1986) 185-199; 0550-321/86 Elsevier Science Publisher B.V. (North-Holland Publishing Division)
- 1988 Spontaneous symmetry breaking and Electromagnetic interactions in biological systems, Del Giudice, Doglia, Milani, Vitiello, Physica Scripta, 38 (1988) 505-507;
- 1988 Non constant order parameter and vacuum evolution Del Giudice, Manka, Milani, Vitiello, Physics Letters B206 (1988) 661-664;
- 1988 Coherence of e1ectromagnetic radiation from living systems, Del Giudice, Doglia, Milani, Vitiello, Cel1 Biophysics 13 (1988) 221-224;
- 1988 Water as a free electric dipole laser, Del Giudice, Preparata, Vitiello, Physical Review Letters, 61 (1988) 1085-88;
- 1989 Magnetic flux quantization and Josephson behaviour in living systems, Del Giudice, Doglia, Dilani, Vitiello, Smith, ““, Physica Scripta, 40, (1989) 786-791;
- 1989 First Steps Toward an Understanding of «cold» Nuclear Fusion, Bressani, Del Giudice, Preparata, Nuovo Cimento, 101A (1989) 845-849;
- 1990 Superradiance. A new approach to coherent dynamical behaviors of condensed matter, Del Giudice E., Preparata G., Frontier Perspectives 1 (2), 16 (1990);
- 1991 Superfluidity in 4He, Del Giudice E., Giuffrida M., Mele R., Preparata G., Physical Review B43, 5381 (1991);
- 1991 Superradiance and Superfluidity in 4He, Del Giudice E., Giuffrida M., Mele R., Preparata G., Europhysics Letters 14, 463, (1991);
- 1992 Superradiance and ferromagnetic behavior, Del Giudice E., Giunta B., Preparata G., Il Nuovo Cimento 14D, 1145 (1992);
- 1992 What makes a crystal stiff enough for the Moessbauer effect?, Bressani T., Del Giudice E., Preparata G., Il Nuovo Cimento D14, 345 (1992);
- 1993 Solid 4He as an ensemble of superradiating nuclei, Del Giudice E., Enz C.P., Mele R., Preparata G., Il Nuovo Cimento D15, 1479 (1993);
- 1993 Superradiance and superfluid 3He, Del Giudice E., Mele R., Muggia Afr, Preparata G., Il Nuovo Cimento D15, 1215 (1993);
- 1993 Quantum – Electrodynamical Coherence and Superfluidity in 3He, Del Giudice, Mole, Muggia, Preparata, Il Nuevo Cimento D15, 1279, (1993).
- 1993 Dicke Hamiltonian and superradiant phase transitions, Del Giudice E., Mele R., Preparata G., Modern Physics Letters B7 (28), 1851 (1993);
- 1993 Coherence in condensed and living•matter, Del Giudice E., Frontier Perspectives 3 (2), 16 (1993);
- 1994 Coherence dynamics in water as a possible explanation of biological menbranes, Del Giudice E., Preparata G., Journal of Biological Physics 20, 105, (1994);
- 1995 QED coherence and the thermodynamics of water, Arani R, Bono I, Del Giudice E., Preparata G., International Journal Physics B9, 1813, (1995);
- 1995 Electrodynamical coherence in water: a possible origin of the tetrahedral coordination Emilio Del Giudice, Alberto Galimberti, Luca Gamberale, Giuliano Preparata; Modern Physics Letters B, v09 n15 (30 June 1995): 953-961
- 1995 Neutron stars and the coherent nuclear interaction, Del Giudice E., Gualdi C., Mangano G., Mele R., Miele G., Preparata G., International Journal of Modern Physics D4, 531, (1995);
- 1996 Coerenza elettromagnetica nella materia, Del Giudice E., Il Nuovo saggiatore 12, n. 5-6, 953. (1996);
- 1997 A further look at waveguide lasers, Del Giudice E., Mele R., Preparata G., Sanvito S., Fontana., IEEE Journal of Quantum Electronics, 34, 2403-2412, (1997);
- 1997 Coherent dynamics in colloids as a key to understand the properties of biological tissues, Del Giudice E., Rivista di Biologia/Biology Forum, 90 p. 3, 479-481, (1997);
- 1998 Sonoluminescence Unveiled? M. Buzzacchi, E. Del Giudice, G. Preparata†, MITH-98/6, arXiv:quant-ph/9804006v1 2 April 1998.
- 1999 Glasses: a new view from QED coherence M. Buzzacchi, E. Del Giudice, G. Preparata†, MITH-98/9, arXiv:cond-mat/9906395v1 25 Jun1999
- 2000 QED Coherence and Electrlyte Solutions, Del Giudice E., Preparata G., Fleischmann M., Journal of Electroanalytional Chemistry, 482, 110-116, (2000);
- 2002 Coherence of the Glassy State, Buzzacchi M., Del Giudice E., Preparata G., International Journal of Modern Physics, B16, 3771-3786, (2002);
- 2002 On the ‘unresonable’ effects of ELF magnetic field upon a system of ions, Del Giudice E., Preparata G., Fleischmann M., Talpo G., Bioelectromagnetcs, 23, 522-530, (2002);
- 2003 Weak Extremely High Frequency Microwaves Effect Pollen – Tube Emergence and Growth in Kiwifruit Pollen Grain Irradiation and Water – Mediated Effects, Calzoni G.L., Borghini F., Del Giudice E., Betti, L., Dal Rio F., Migliori M., Trebbi G., Speranza A., The Journal of Alternative and Complementary Medicine, 9, 217-233, (2003);
- 2004 Electrolytic Hydriding of Pd79,5 – Rh20,5 Alloy, Comisso N., De Ninno A., Del Giudice E., Electrochimica Acta, 49 (9-10), 1379-1388, (2004);
- 2005 Yeast Suspensions: A Controllable Example of a Coherent Quantum Machine?, Marziale Milani; Emilio Del Giudice; Grazia Santisi; Getullio Talpo; Giuseppe Vitiello, Electromagnetic Biology and Medicine, v24 n3 (200501): 331-340
- 2005 Coherent Quantum Electrodynamics in Living Matter Emilio Del Giudice; Antonella De Ninno; Martin Fleischmann; Giuliano Mengoli; Marziale Milani; Getullio Talpo; Giuseppe Vitiello; Electromagnetic Biology and Medicine (formerly Electro- and Magnetobiology) 24, no. 3 (2005): 199-210
- 2006 Dynamics of the ion cyclotron resonance effect on amino acids adsorbed at the interfaces, Comisso N., Del Giudice E., De Ninno A., Fleischmann M., Giuliani L., Mengoli G., Merlo F., M., Talpo G., Bioelectromagnetcs, 27, 16-25, (2006);
- 2006 Role of the electromagnetic field in the formation of domains in the process of symmetry – breaking phase transitions, Del Giudice E., Vitiello G., Physical Review, A74, 022105 (1-9), (2006);
- 2007 Quantum Fluctuations, Gauge Freedom and mesoscopic/macroscopic Stability, Del Giudice E., Vitiello G., Journal of Ohysics: Conference Series, 87, 012009, (2007);
- 2007 Old and New Views on the Structure of Matter and the special case of Living Matter Del Giudice E., Journal of Physics: Conference Series, 67, 012006 (2007);
- 2008 The Investigation of Nucleation Using microelectrodes I. The Ensemble Overages of the Times of Birth of the First Nucleus, Abyyaneh M., Fleischmann M., Del Giudice E., Vitiello G., “Electrocimica Acta, Doi: 10.1016/5, ELECTACTA, 2008.02.122
- 2008 The Investigation of Nucleation Using microelectrodes II. The second moment of the Times of Birth of the First Nucleus,
- 2008 Evidence of Coherent Nuclear Reactions in Condensed Matter, De Ninno A., Del Giudice E., Frattolillo A., American Chemical Society Symposium Series, Low Energy Nuclear Reactions Sourcebook (eds J. Marwan, S. Krivit). Oxford University Press, (2008);
- 2009 Water and the Autocatalysis in Living Matter, Del Giudice E., Tedeschi A., Electromagnetic Biology and Medicine, Vol.28, issue 1, 46 (2009);
- 2009 The Role of Water in the Living Organisms, Del Giudice E., Tedeschi A., Neural Network World,
- 2009 Thermodynamics of irreversible processes and quantum field theory: An interplay for the understanding of ecosystem dynamics Emilio Del Giudice; Riccardo M Pulselli; Enzo Tiezzi; Ecological Modelling, v220 n16 (2009): 1874-1879
- 2009 The role of electromagnetic potentials in the evolutionary dynamics of ecosystems Larissa Brizhik; Emilio Del Giudice; Sven E Jørgensen; Nadia Marchettini; Enzo Tiezzi; Ecological Modelling, v220 n16 (200908): 1865-1869
- 2009 Water respiration: the base of the living state, Voeikov V.L., Del Giudice E., in “Water” (1 July 2009), pp. 52–75
- 2010 Fisica quantistica e vuoto Emilio del Giudice Rivista di filosofia neo-scolastica. 102, no. 2, (2010): 253 Università Cattolica del Sacro Cuore
- 2010 Water: A medium where dissipative structures are produced by a coherent dynamics Nadia Marchettini; Emilio Del Giudice; Vladimir Voeikov; Enzo Tiezzi; Journal of Theoretical Biology, v265 n4 (201008): 511-516
- 2010 Water dynamics at the root of metamorphosis in living organisms, Del Giudice E., Spinetti P.R., Tedeschi A., in “Water” (September 2010), vol. 2, n. 3, pp. 566–586
- 2010 Collective Molecular Dynamics of a Floating Water Bridge E. Del Giudice, E.C.Fuchs, G. Vitiello; WATER 2, 69-82, 30 July 2010
- 2011 The role of water in the information exchange between the components of an ecosystem Larissa S Brizhik; Emilio Del Giudice; Alberto Tedeschi; Vladimir L Voeikov; Ecological Modelling, v222 n16 (201108): 2869-2877
- 2011 Water Plasma Modes and Nuclear Transmutations on the Metallic Cathode of a Plasma Discharge Electrolytic Cell D Cirillo; Emilio Del Giudice; Roberto Germano; S Sivasubrammanian; Y N Srivastava; V Tontodonato; Giuseppe Vitiello; A Widom; Key Engineering Materials, v495 (201111): 124-128
- 2011 The interplay of biomolecules and water at the origin of the active behavior of living organisms, Emilio Del Giudice, P.Stefanini, Alessandra Tedeschi, Giuseppe Vitiello, Journal of Physics: Conferences Series”, 329 (2011)
- 2011 Emergence of the coherent structure of liquid water Ivan Bono, Emilio Del Giudice, Luca Gamberale, Marc Henry; Water ISSN 2073-4441, Water 2011, 2, 1-x manuscripts; doi:10.3390/ w20x000x
- 2011 DNA waves and water Luc Montagnier, J. Aissa, Emilio Del Giudice, C.Lavallee, A.Tedeschi, Giusepep Vitiello; Journal of Physics: Conference Series 306 (2011) 012007, IOP Publishing, 5th International Workshop (201012)
- 2012 Emergence of the Coherent Structure of Liquid Water Ivan Bono; Emilio Del Giudice; Luca Gamberale; Marc Henry Water, v4 n4 (2012.12.09): 510-532
- 2013 Communication and the Emergence of Collective Behavior in Living Organisms: A Quantum Approach Marco Bischof; Emilio Del Giudice; Molecular Biology International, v2013 n5 (2013): 1-19
- 2013 Oxhydroelectric Effect in Bi-Distilled Water Roberto Germano; Emilio del Giudice; Antonella de Ninno; Vittorio Elia; Cornelia Hison; Elena Napoli; Valentino Tontodonato; F P Tuccinardi; G Vitiello Key Engineering Materials, v543 (201303): 455-459
- 2014 Self-similarity properties of nafionized and filtered water and deformed coherent states A. Capolupo, E. Del Giudice, V. Elia, R. Germano, E. Napoli, M. Niccoli, A. Tedeschi, G. Vitiello, Inter. J. Mod. Phys. B 28 (2014) 1450007 (20 pages)

== Meetings ==
- The role of QED (Quantum Electro Dynamics) in medicine, Giuliano Preparata, Getullio Talpo, Emilio Del Giudice, Baldassarre Messina et al.{dead link} – Proceedings meeting 14 December 1999 Un. Roma la Sapienza
- 5th International Workshop DICE2010, IOP Publishing “DNA waves and water” - Luc Montagnier, J. Aissa, Emilio Del Giudice, C. Lavallee, Albero Tedeschi and Giuseppe Vitello - Journal of Physics: Conference Series 306 (2011) 012007 doi : 10.1088/1742-6596/306/1/012007.]
