= Van den Brink =

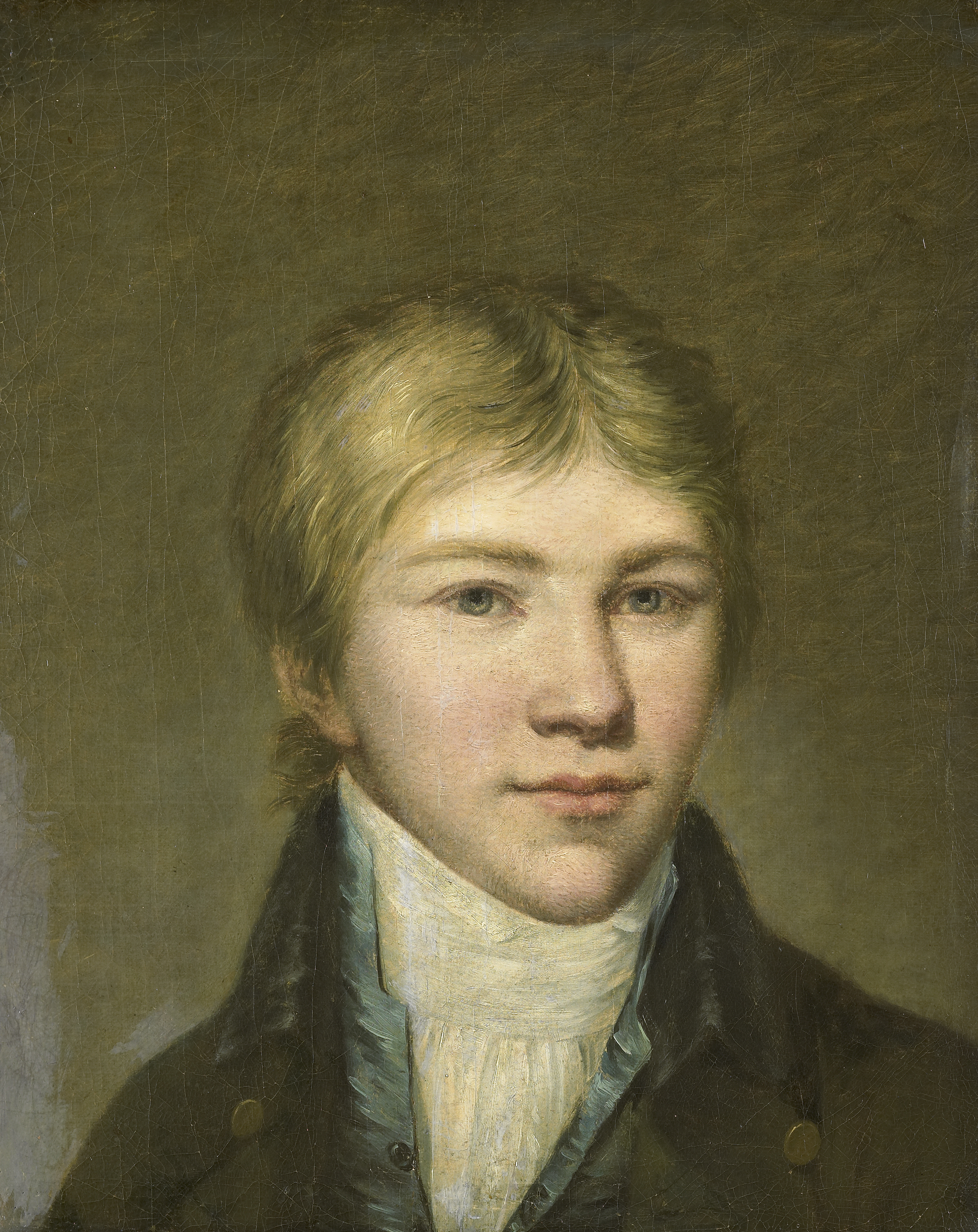
Hendrik Arend van den Brink (1783–1852)

Van den Brink is a Dutch toponymic surname meaning "from the village center". The name is quite common, particularly in the Veluwe region, with 13,185 people in the Netherlands in 2007. People with this surname include:

Van den Brink

- Ad van den Brink (born 1944), Dutch sculptor
- Bart van den Brink (born 1978), Dutch politician
- Bas van den Brink (born 1982), Dutch footballer
- Bert van den Brink (born 1958), Dutch jazz pianist and composer
- Dolf van den Brink (born 1973), Dutch businessman
- Eric Van Den Brink, Dutch musician and record producer
- Hans Maarten van den Brink (born 1956), Dutch journalist and writer
- Harry van den Brink (born 1961), Dutch military commander
- Jan van den Brink (1915–2006), Dutch politician and banker
- Jeroen van den Brink (born 1968), Dutch theoretical physicist
- Marcel R.M. van den Brink (born 1960), Dutch hematologist
- Nina van den Brink (born 1966), Finnish-Swedish author and journalist
- Patrick van den Brink (born 1967), Dutch politician
- Wim van den Brink (born 1952), Dutch psychiatrist

Bakhuizen van den Brink

- Jan Nicolaas Bakhuizen van den Brink (1896–1987), Dutch theologian
- Reinier Cornelis Bakhuizen van den Brink (1881–1945), Dutch botanist
- Reinier Cornelis Bakhuizen van den Brink (1911–1987), Dutch botanist

== See also ==
- Vandenbrink Design, Dutch car design and coachbuilding company, a.o. of the Vandenbrink GTO
- Ten Brink, surname with a similar origin
- Brink (surname)
