= Brink (surname) =

Brink is a Low German, Dutch, Danish and Swedish toponymic surname. The Dutch and Low German meaning is "village green". In Danish and Swedish, the name is thought to be a borrowing of Middle Dutch brinc / brink, meaning "grassy edge" or perhaps "slope", and the Danish word now means "where the water runs deep". Notable people with the surname include:

- Aaron Brink (born 1974), American mixed martial artist
- Alex Brink (born 1985), Canadian football player
- André Brink (1935–2015), South African novelist
- Andries Brink (1877–1947), South African lieutenant general
- Bernhard Brink (born 1952), German singer
- Bobby Brink (born 2001), American ice hockey player
- Brad Brink (born 1965), American baseball player
- Bridget A. Brink, American diplomat
- Cameron Brink (born 2001), American women's basketball player
- Carol Ryrie Brink (1895–1981), American novelist
- Charles Brink (1907–1994), German-born British classical scholar
- Chris Brink (born 1951), South African academic
- Christian Brink (born 1983), Norwegian football player
- Cilliers Brink (born 1987), South African politician
- Cyle Brink (born 1994), South African rugby player
- David Brink (businessman) (born 1939), South African businessman
- David Brink (cyclist) (1947–2019), American racing cyclist
- David M. Brink (1930–2021), Australian-British nuclear physicist
- David O. Brink (born 1958), American philosopher
- David R. Brink (1919–2017), American attorney
- Elga Brink (1905–1985), German film actress
- Francis G. Brink (1893–1952), American military officer
- Gary J. Brink (fl. 1973–99), American set decorator
- George Brink (1889–1971), South African lieutenant general
- James Brink (1925–2017), American tennis player
- Jan Brink (born 1960), Swedish equestrian
- Johannes Brink (1912–1976), Dutch freestyle swimmer
- Jörgen Brink (born 1974), Swedish cross-country skier and biathlete
- Jos Brink (1942–2007), Dutch performer and journalist
- Josefin Brink (born 1969), Swedish politician
- Julius Brink (born 1982), German beach volleyball player
- Kalle Brink (born 1975), Swedish golfer
- Kennadi Brink, ring name of Jessika Heiser (born 1993), American wrestler
- Kim Brink (born 1958), Danish football manager
- Larry Brink (1928–2016), American football player
- Lars Brink (1943–2022), Swedish theoretical physicist
- Maria Brink (born 1977), American heavy metal singer songwriter
- Mark Brink (born 1998), Danish football midfielder
- Michael Brink (1914–1947), German World War II resistance member
- Milton Brink (1910–1999), American ice hockey player
- Raymond Woodard Brink (1890–1973), American mathematician
- Rikke Holm Brink (born 1972), Danish footballer
- Robby Brink (born 1971), South African rugby player
- Robert Brink (1924–2014), American violinist, conductor, and educator
- Robert H. Brink (born 1946), American politician from Virginia
- Royal Alexander Brink (1897–1984), Canadian-born American plant geneticist
- Ruud Brink (1937–1990), Dutch jazz saxophonist and clarinetist
- Samantha Brink (born 1995), Australian civil engineer
- Sjoert Brink (born 1981), Dutch bridge player
- Sjonni Brink (1974–2011), Icelandic singer
- Stefan Brink (born 1952), Swedish philologist

== See also ==
- Ten Brink, Dutch surname
- Van den Brink, Dutch surname
