= Water thread experiment =

Physical phenomenon

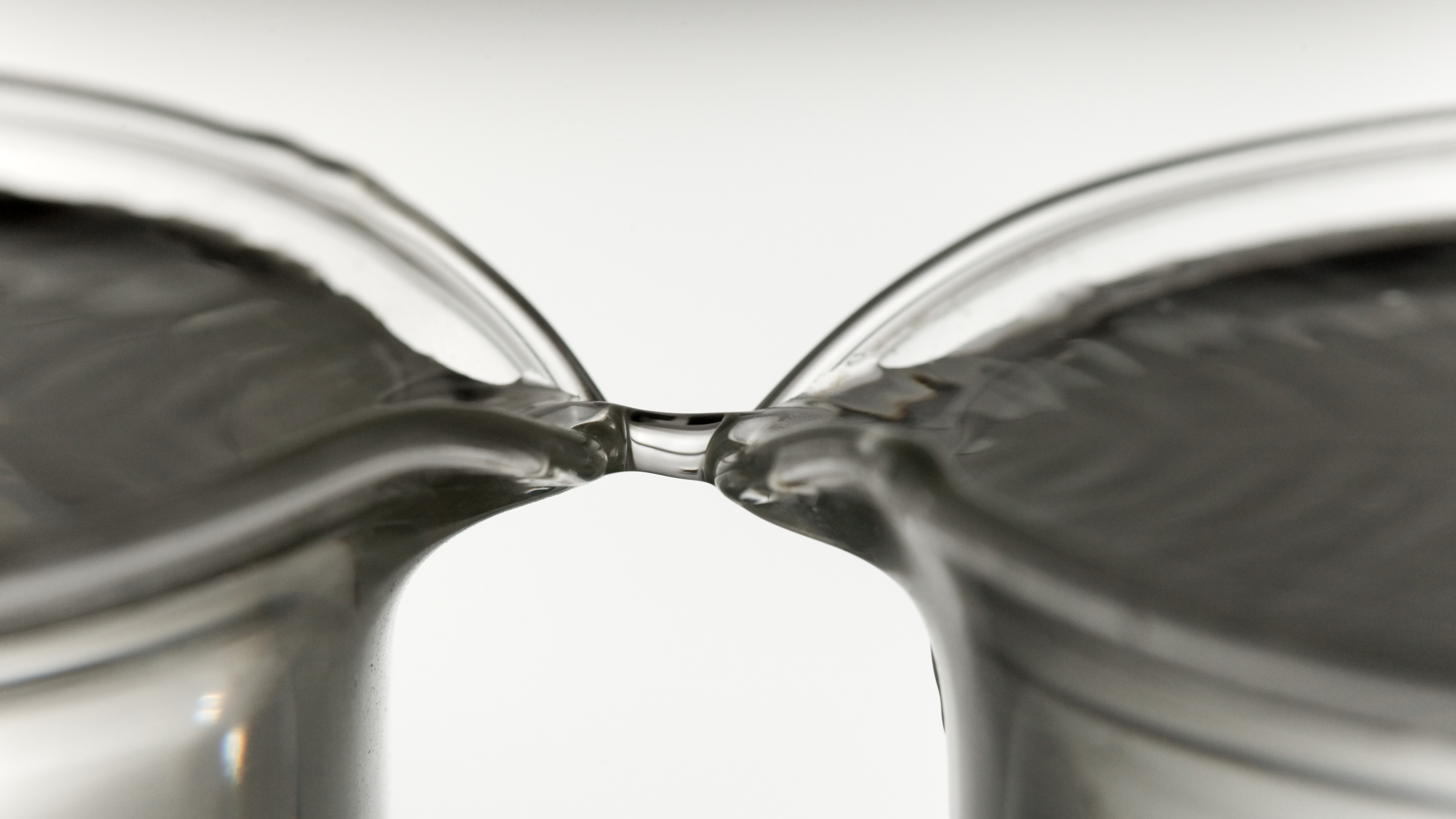
A floating water bridge formed between two beakers.

A repetition of the experiment using a 5 kV Dc source. The bridge continued until the electricity was interrupted in the last frame.

The water thread experiment is a phenomenon that occurs when two containers of deionized water, placed on an insulator, are connected by a thread, then a high-voltage positive electric charge is applied to one container, and a negative charge to the other. At a critical voltage, an unsupported water liquid bridge is formed between the containers, which will remain even when they are separated. The phenomenon was first reported in 1893 in a public lecture by the British engineer William Armstrong.

The bridge as observed in a typical configuration has a diameter of 1–3 mm so the bridge remains intact when pulled as far as 25 millimetres (0.98 in), and remains stable up to 45 minutes. The surface temperature also rises from an initial surface temperature of 20 °C (68 °F) up to 60 °C (140 °F) before breakdown.

== Experiment ==
In a typical experiment, two 100 mL beakers are filled with deionized water to roughly 3 mm below the edge of the beaker, and the water exposed to 15 kV direct current, with one beaker turning negative, and the other positive. After building up electric charge, the water then spontaneously rises along the thread over the glass walls and forms a "water bridge" between them. When one beaker is slowly pushed away from the other, the structure remains. When the voltage rises to 25 kV, the structure can be pulled apart as far as 25 millimetres (0.98 in). If the thread is very short, then the force of the water may be strong enough to push the thread from the positive glass into the negative glass.

The water generally travels from anode to cathode, but the direction may vary due to the different surface charge that builds up at the water bridge surface, which will generate electrical shear stresses of different signs. The bridge breaks into droplets due to capillary action when the beakers are pulled apart at a critical distance, or the voltage is reduced to a critical value.

The bridge needs clean, deionized water to be formed, and its stability is dramatically reduced as ions are introduced into the liquid (by either adding salt or from electrochemical reactions at the electrode surface).

== Causes ==
Although the phenomenon still needs to be studied further, the scientific community agrees that surface polarization at the water surface when a high tangent electrical field is applied is responsible for the extraordinary stability of the system, which has been confirmed via experiments, theory and simulations. The same mechanism has been known for decades and has been applied for stabilization of liquid films and oil liquid bridges in the past. Some have speculated that this bridge is made up of an H_{3}O_{2} lattice or exclusion zone water. However, there is no single experimental proof or measurement of such claims.
