= Paolo Di Vecchia =

Italian theoretical physicist

Paolo Di Vecchia (born October 29, 1942, in Terracina) is an Italian theoretical physicist who works in the field of elementary particle physics, quantum field theory and string theory.

== Life ==
Di Vecchia graduated from the University of Rome with Bruno Touschek in 1966. As a post-doctoral researcher, he worked at the Nuclear Research Center in Frascati (where a permanent position was offered to him) and spent two years at the Massachusetts Institute of Technology and CERN.

In 1974 he became Assistant Professor at the NORDITA in Copenhagen. In 1978 he came back for a year at CERN. In 1979 he became a professor at the Free University of Berlin and from 1980 to 1986 he taught at the Bergische Universität Wuppertal. Since 1986 he has been a professor at NORDITA. Since NORDITA moved to Stockholm he spent half of the time there and half of the time at the Niels Bohr Institute in Copenhagen.

He actively participates to the tea time breaks at the Niels Bohr Institute, organized everyday by Christopher John Pethick at 15.30.

== Work ==
In the 1970s Di Vecchia was one of the pioneers of string theory. Among other things, he formulated with Lars Brink and others the locally supersymmetric Lagrangian for fermionic strings (i.e. those with fermionic excitations, half-integer spin). Previously, the Nambu-Goto action had been known for the bosonic string and different groups tried to construct a fermionic action.

In 1972, along with Emilio Del Giudice and Sergio Fubini, he introduced the "DDF states" scheme (also known as the "DDF construction"), which is named by the initials of the three scientists.

Along with Stanley Deser and Bruno Zumino he formulated string theory as a two-dimensional analogue of the general theory of relativity.

Afterwards, he turned his investigations to instantons in quantum field theory and other. He returned to string theory in 1981 with the publication of the works by Alexander Polyakov who used the effect of Di Vecchia and colleagues for the quantization of strings, then known as the Polyakov action.

In the 2000s he focused on the expansion of the AdS/CFT correspondence to low supersymmetric and non-conformal gauge theories, the construction of four-dimensional effective Lagrangians for lower energies from the compactification of magnetised D-brane models, and the high-energy scattering of closed strings in the framework of the theory of D-branes.

Since 1994, he has been organizing Scandinavian conferences for string theory at NORDITA.

In 2003 he became a member of the Royal Danish Academy of Sciences and Letters.

== Bibliography ==
- Locally supersymmetric action for the superstring in Andrea Cappelli, Elena Castellani, Filippo Colomo, Di Vecchia (ed.) The birth of string theory , Cambridge University Press 2012
- with Adam Swimmer The beginnings of string theory: a historical sketch, LN Physics 737, 2008, 119.
- "The birth of string theory", LN Physics 737, 2008, 59-118.
- with Emilio Del Giudice and Sergio Fubini, "General properties of the dual resonances model", Annals of Physics 70, 1972, 378–398.
- with Lars Brink, Stanley Deser, Bruno Zumino Paul S. Howe, "Locally supersymmetry for spinning particles", Physics Letters B, Volume 64, 1976, pp. 435-438
- Brink, Howe A locally supersymmetric and reparametrization invariant action for the spinning string, Physics Letters B Volume 65, 1976, pp. 471-474
- Editor with JL Petersen: "Perspectives in String Theory." Proc. NORDITA / Niels Bohr Institute Meeting, Copenhagen October 1987, World Scientific, 1988
- with Antonella Liccardo: "Gauge theories from D branes" in Pierre Cartier et al. Frontiers in Number Theory, Physics and Geometry, Volume 2, Springer, 2007, Arxiv
- "An introduction to the AdS/CFT correspondence," Progress of Physics, Volume 48, 2000, 87-92
