= David Brink =

David Brink may refer to:

- David Brink (businessman) (born 1939), South African businessman
- David Brink (cyclist) (1947–2019), American cyclist
- David O. Brink (born 1958), American philosopher
- David R. Brink (1919–2017), American attorney
- David M. Brink (1930–2021, Australian-British nuclear physicist
