= Vicinal =

Vicinal ("In the neighbourhood of") is a general adjective used as a standard, specific, technical descriptor in a range of contexts, including:

- Vicinal (chemistry), stands for any two functional groups bonded to two adjacent atoms.
- Vicinal tramway or Buurtspoor, a system of narrow gauge tramways or local railways in Belgium.
- In materials science, a "vicinal substrate" is a thin-film substrate whose surface normal deviates slightly from a major crystallographic axis.
- In physics, the exclusion zone of changed physical/molecular structure at the boundary of many liquids and a barrier has been described as the interfacial layer or the vicinal layer.
