= Henry Lai =

Henry Lai is the name of:

- Lai Hang (1928–1965), Chinese actor
- Henry Lai Wan-man (born 1961), Hong Kong composer
- Henry Lai (scientist), bioengineering scientist and professor at University of Washington
