= Claus Christian Scholz-Nauendorff =

Austrian cyberneticist and robot builder (1915–1992)

- Born: 1915
- Died: 1992 (aged 76–77)
- Citizenship: Austrian
- Known for: Maschinenmensch (MM) humanoid robot series; CCSN System for motivated artificial intelligence
- Scientific career
- Fields: Cybernetics, robotics, artificial intelligence
- Institutions: Gesellschaft für Psycho-Elektronik und Kybernetik, Vienna

Claus Christian Scholz-Nauendorff (1915–1992) was an Austrian cyberneticist, engineer and professor based in Vienna. He is best known for designing and building a series of humanoid robots, the Maschinenmenschen (MM) series, between 1957 and 1973, for which he was nicknamed "the Viennese father of robots" in the Austrian press. In his later career he directed the research institute of the Gesellschaft für Psycho-Elektronik und Kybernetik (Society for Psycho-Electronics and Cybernetics) in Vienna, where he developed an experimental framework for motivated artificial intelligence he called the CCSN System.

== The Maschinenmensch (MM) robot series ==
Scholz-Nauendorff constructed his robots in his private apartment in Vienna's Landstraße district. His stated ambition was to create humanoid robots equipped with artificial intelligence capable of interacting autonomously with their environment, a goal he did not achieve. The machines were instead operated by remote control, in demonstrations frequently via a telephone rotary dial and, in later models, by a "phantom" mirror-figure whose movements the robot would reproduce.

- MM6 (1957–58): 186 cm tall, 64 kg, operated by electro-hydraulic actuators. Development was halted due to mechanical problems. The robot was rediscovered in the early 2010s in Scholz-Nauendorff's former apartment, where his widow had kept it in a bay window near the kitchen, and subsequently transferred to the Technisches Museum Wien.
- MM7 "Selektor" (1961): The best-known of the series. Moved by electric motors rather than hydraulics, MM7 could roll on wheels; its body was constructed from reinforced fibreglass. It incorporated feedback stepping switches and visual receptors, features for which curators have described it as a precursor to modern industrial robots. The robot was featured in Popular Mechanics (1961) and Life (1964). It is held by the Technisches Museum Wien.
- MM8 "Contina" (c. 1964): Rolled on rigid legs and was faster than MM7. The head was modified in a later upgrade. Held by the Wiener Bezirksmuseum Landstraße.
- MM9 (c. 1973): The final robot in the series. No photographs are publicly known to survive; engineering diagrams appeared in an article in praktiker magazine (issue 6/1990). Its current location is unknown.

The robots were capable of simple programmed actions including raising a hand, opening doors, vacuuming, pouring liquids and mixing drinks. At public demonstrations, MM7 lit cigarettes for female visitors as a crowd-pleasing routine. Coverage appeared in Popular Mechanics (1961), Life (1964), and the German edition of Micky Maus (c. 1970).

== The CCSN System and later work ==
After completing the MM series, Scholz-Nauendorff moved away from physical robotics and toward theoretical and experimental work on artificial intelligence. He directed the research institute of the Gesellschaft für Psycho-Elektronik und Kybernetik in Vienna, where he developed the CCSN System (an acronym of his own initials), which he described as an example of "motivated artificial intelligence" (motivierte Künstliche Intelligenz, MKI).

The CCSN System was built on custom hardware designed to simulate motivational states such as energy depletion and social drives, which Scholz-Nauendorff treated as prerequisites for creative and adaptive behaviour. The system included a dialogue interface (keyboard and screen), a tableau displaying the internal state of the system, and a physical "scene" containing a model clock, a lamp, and three counter displays representing financial accounts. He used the platform to conduct experiments in social and antisocial behaviour in artificial agents, including simulated fraud, theft, fee evasion, welfare abuse, and the effects of punishment versus "education through kindness and love" on moral learning.

He presented this work at international venues including the Wessex Institute of Technology in Southampton (1988) and the 9th International Congress "Data Processing in Europe" (1990). An earlier paper, published in the proceedings of Mikroelektronik 87, extended these arguments to the social and societal impact of creative AI systems.

== Selected publications ==
- Scholz-Nauendorff, C. C. (1982). "System with automated exploring of problems for intelligent data processes by ergonomic dialog".
- Scholz-Nauendorff, C. C. (1987). "Kreative Künstliche Intelligenz - Systeme und ihre sozialen und gesellschaftlichen Einflüsse". In Mikroelektronik 87. Vienna: Springer.
- Scholz-Nauendorff, C. C. (1988). "Motivated Artificial Intelligence, the Precondition to Creativity". Wessex Institute of Technology, Southampton, UK.
- Scholz-Nauendorff, C. C. (1990). "Kreative Künstliche Intelligenzsysteme und ihre sozialen und gesellschaftlichen Einflüsse". Paper presented at the 9th International Congress "Data Processing in Europe".

== Legacy ==
Scholz-Nauendorff's surviving robots are held by the Technisches Museum Wien (MM6, MM7) and the Wiener Bezirksmuseum Landstraße (MM8). They have been featured in major Austrian exhibitions, including Roboter. Maschine und Mensch? (2012–13) and Künstliche Intelligenz? (2020) at the Technisches Museum Wien. Curator Christian Stadelmann, who rediscovered MM6 during research for the 2012–13 exhibition, has described the robot as occupying a "rather bizarre status" within the museum, reflecting both the ambition of Scholz-Nauendorff's project and the simplicity of its technical solutions.

An archived documentary interview with Scholz-Nauendorff in his workshop, conducted by the journalist Reinhard Schlögl, is preserved by the Österreichische Mediathek.
