= Solar cell research =

Research in the field of photovoltaics

Reported timeline of research solar cell energy conversion efficiencies since 1976 (National Renewable Energy Laboratory)

There are currently many research groups active in the field of photovoltaics in universities and research institutions around the world. This research can be categorized into three areas: making current technology solar cells cheaper and/or more efficient to effectively compete with other energy sources; developing new technologies based on new solar cell architectural designs; and developing new materials to serve as more efficient energy converters from light energy into electric current or light absorbers and charge carriers.

== Silicon processing ==
One way of reducing the cost is to develop cheaper methods of obtaining silicon that is sufficiently pure. Silicon is a very common element, but is normally bound in silica, or silica sand. Processing silica (SiO_{2}) to produce silicon is a very high energy process - at current efficiencies, it takes one to two years for a conventional solar cell to generate as much energy as was used to make the silicon it contains. More energy efficient methods of synthesis are not only beneficial to the solar industry, but also to industries surrounding silicon technology as a whole.

The current industrial production of silicon is via the reaction between carbon (charcoal) and silica at a temperature around 1700 °C. In this process, known as carbothermic reduction, each tonne of silicon (metallurgical grade, about 98% pure) is produced with the emission of about 1.5 tonnes of carbon dioxide.

Solid silica can be directly converted (reduced) to pure silicon by electrolysis in a molten salt bath at a fairly mild temperature (800 to 900 °C). While this new process is in principle the same as the FFC Cambridge Process which was first discovered in late 1996, the interesting laboratory finding is that such electrolytic silicon is in the form of porous silicon which turns readily into a fine powder, with a particle size of a few micrometers, and may therefore offer new opportunities for development of solar cell technologies.

Another approach is also to reduce the amount of silicon used and thus cost, is by micromachining wafers into very thin, virtually transparent layers that could be used as transparent architectural coverings. The technique involves taking a silicon wafer, typically 1 to 2 mm thick, and making a multitude of parallel, transverse slices across the wafer, creating a large number of slivers that have a thickness of 50 micrometres and a width equal to the thickness of the original wafer. These slices are rotated 90 degrees, so that the surfaces corresponding to the faces of the original wafer become the edges of the slivers. The result is to convert, for example, a 150 mm diameter, 2 mm-thick wafer having an exposed silicon surface area of about 175 cm^{2} per side into about 1000 slivers having dimensions of 100 mm × 2 mm × 0.1 mm, yielding a total exposed silicon surface area of about 2000 cm^{2} per side. As a result of this rotation, the electrical doping and contacts that were on the face of the wafer are located at the edges of the sliver, rather than at the front and rear as in the case of conventional wafer cells. This has the interesting effect of making the cell sensitive from both the front and rear of the cell (a property known as bifaciality). Using this technique, one silicon wafer is enough to build a 140 watt panel, compared to about 60 wafers needed for conventional modules of same power output.

=== Nanocrystalline solar cells ===
These structures make use of some of the same thin-film light absorbing materials but are overlain as an extremely thin absorber on a supporting matrix of conductive polymer or mesoporous metal oxide having a very high surface area to increase internal reflections (and hence increase the probability of light absorption). Using nanocrystals allows one to design architectures on the length scale of nanometers, the typical exciton diffusion length. In particular, single-nanocrystal ('channel') devices, an array of single p-n junctions between the electrodes and separated by a period of about a diffusion length, represent a new architecture for solar cells and potentially high efficiency.

== Thin-film processing ==
Thin-film photovoltaic cells can use less than 1% of the expensive raw material (silicon or other light absorbers) compared to wafer-based solar cells, leading to a significant price drop per Watt peak capacity. There are many research groups around the world actively researching different thin-film approaches and/or materials.

One particularly promising technology is crystalline silicon thin films on glass substrates. This technology combines the advantages of crystalline silicon as a solar cell material (abundance, non-toxicity, high efficiency, long-term stability) with the cost savings of using a thin-film approach.

Another interesting aspect of thin-film solar cells is the possibility to deposit the cells on all kind of materials, including flexible substrates (PET for example), which opens a new dimension for new applications.

== Metamorphic solar cells ==
Metamorphic solar cells, also called lattice-mismatched solar cells, are multijunction solar cells that incorporate materials with different lattice constants. These are contrasted with lattice-matched solar cells in which all subcells have the same lattice constant. The main advantage of metamorphic cells is the ability to optimize the band gaps of each subcell for maximum efficiency, a process known as band-gap engineering. Although band gaps can be modified in all multijunction solar cells, metamorphic semiconductors allow for greatly increased flexibility.

A variation of this method is to grow the higher band gap subcells first and then grow the lower band gap subcells with a lattice-mismatch. Such cells are known as inverted metamorphic (IMM) cells. This also necessitates that the substrate is removed, which is done either through etching or epitaxial lift-off. The term upright metamorphic cell is sometimes used to refer to cells that aren't inverted. In 2020, researchers at the NREL demonstrated 47.1% efficiency with a six-junction IMM cell, the world record at the time.

== Polymer processing ==
The invention of conductive polymers (for which Alan Heeger, Alan G. MacDiarmid and Hideki Shirakawa were awarded a Nobel Prize) may lead to the development of much cheaper cells that are based on inexpensive plastics. However, organic solar cells generally suffer from degradation upon exposure to UV light, and hence have lifetimes which are far too short to be viable. The bonds in the polymers, are always susceptible to breaking up when radiated with shorter wavelengths. Additionally, the conjugated double bond systems in the polymers which carry the charge, react more readily with light and oxygen. So most conductive polymers, being highly unsaturated and reactive, are highly sensitive to atmospheric moisture and oxidation, making commercial applications difficult.

== Nanoparticle processing ==
Experimental non-silicon solar panels can be made of quantum heterostructures, e.g. carbon nanotubes or quantum dots, embedded in conductive polymers or mesoporous metal oxides. In addition, thin films of many of these materials on conventional silicon solar cells can increase the optical coupling efficiency into the silicon cell, thus boosting the overall efficiency. By varying the size of the quantum dots, the cells can be tuned to absorb different wavelengths. Although the research is still in its infancy, quantum dot modified photovoltaics may be able to achieve up to 42% energy conversion efficiency due to multiple exciton generation (MEG).

MIT researchers have found a way of using a virus to improve solar cell efficiency by a third.

== Transparent conductors ==
Many new solar cells use transparent thin films that are also conductors of electrical charge. The dominant conductive thin films used in research now are transparent conductive oxides (abbreviated "TCO"), and include fluorine-doped tin oxide (SnO_{2}:F, or "FTO"), doped zinc oxide (e.g.: ZnO:Al), and indium tin oxide (abbreviated "ITO"). These conductive films are also used in the LCD industry for flat panel displays. The dual function of a TCO allows light to pass through a substrate window to the active light-absorbing material beneath, and also serves as an ohmic contact to transport photogenerated charge carriers away from that light-absorbing material. The present TCO materials are effective for research, but perhaps are not yet optimized for large-scale photovoltaic production. They require very special deposition conditions at high vacuum, they can sometimes suffer from poor mechanical strength, and most have poor transmittance in the infrared portion of the spectrum (e.g.: ITO thin films can also be used as infrared filters in airplane windows). These factors make large-scale manufacturing more costly.

A relatively new area has emerged using carbon nanotube networks as a transparent conductor for organic solar cells. Nanotube networks are flexible and can be deposited on surfaces a variety of ways. With some treatment, nanotube films can be highly transparent in the infrared, possibly enabling efficient low-bandgap solar cells. Nanotube networks are p-type conductors, whereas traditional transparent conductors are exclusively n-type. The availability of a p-type transparent conductor could lead to new cell designs that simplify manufacturing and improve efficiency.

== Silicon wafer-based solar cells ==
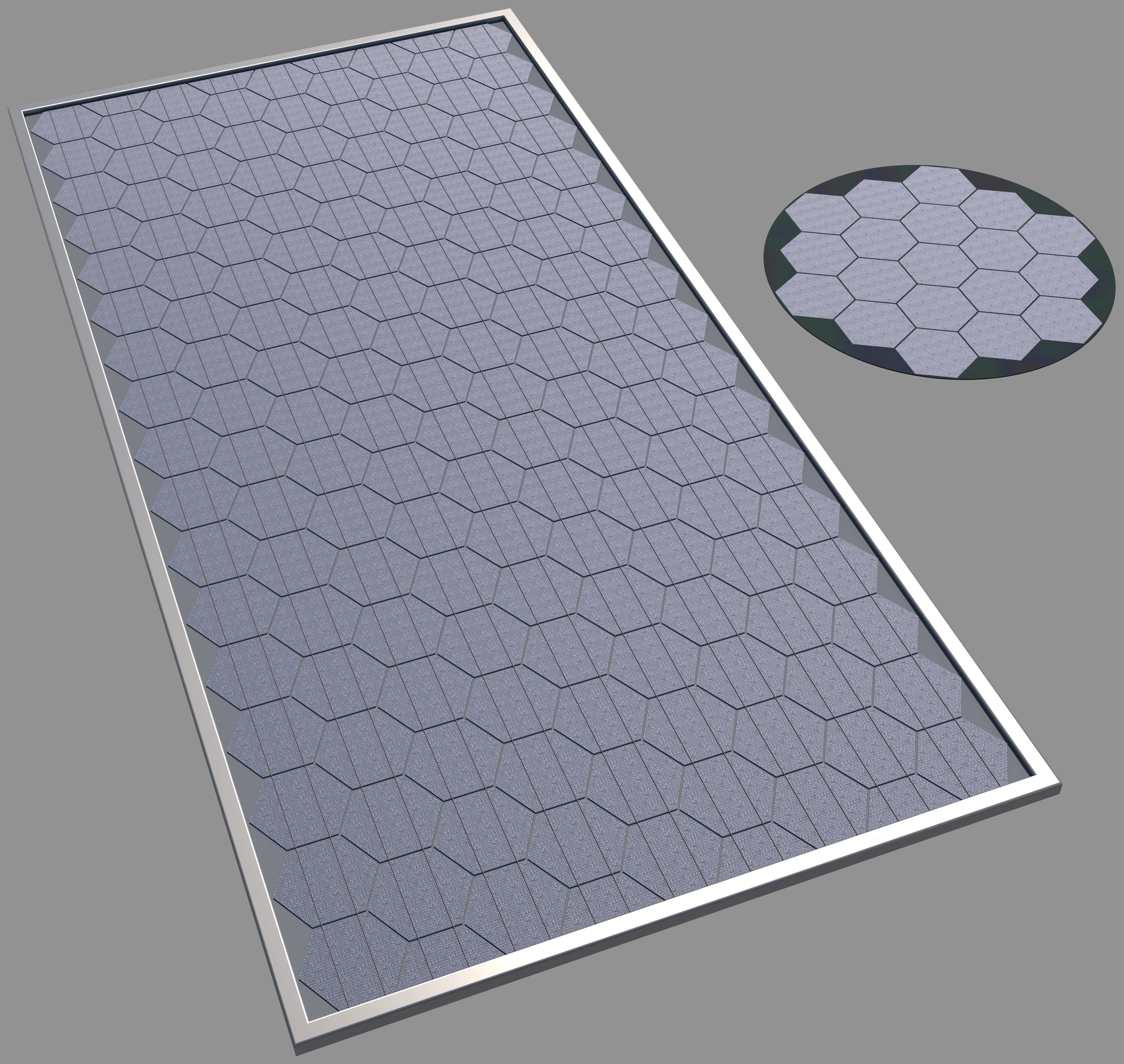
3D design of hexagon solar cells made from a 300mm wafer could use semiconductor device fabrication techniques for multi-junction solar cells or quantum dots.

Despite the numerous attempts at making better solar cells by using new and exotic materials, the reality is that the photovoltaics market is still dominated by silicon wafer-based solar cells (first-generation solar cells). This means that most solar cell manufacturers are currently equipped to produce this type of solar cells. Consequently, a large body of research is being done all over the world to manufacture silicon wafer-based solar cells at lower cost and to increase the conversion efficiencies without an exorbitant increase in production cost. The ultimate goal for both wafer-based and alternative photovoltaic concepts is to produce solar electricity at a cost comparable to currently market-dominant coal, natural gas, and nuclear power in order to make it the leading primary energy source. To achieve this it may be necessary to reduce the cost of installed solar systems from currently about US$1.80 (for bulk Si technologies) to about US$0.50 per Watt peak power. Since a major part of the final cost of a traditional bulk silicon module is related to the high cost of solar grade polysilicon feedstock (about US$0.4/Watt peak) there exists substantial drive to make Si solar cells thinner (material savings) or to make solar cells from cheaper upgraded metallurgical silicon (so called "dirty Si").

IBM has a semiconductor wafer reclamation process that uses a specialized pattern removal technique to repurpose scrap semiconductor wafers to a form used to manufacture silicon-based solar panels. The new process was recently awarded the "2007 Most Valuable Pollution Prevention Award" from The National Pollution Prevention Roundtable (NPPR).

== Infrared solar cells ==
Researchers at Idaho National Laboratory, along with partners at Lightwave Power Inc. in Cambridge, MA and Patrick Pinhero of the University of Missouri, have devised an inexpensive way to produce plastic sheets containing billions of nanoantennas that collect heat energy generated by the sun and other sources, which garnered two 2007 Nano50 awards. The company ceased operations in 2010. While methods to convert the energy into usable electricity still need to be developed, the sheets could one day be manufactured as lightweight "skins" that power everything from hybrid cars to computers and mobile phones with higher efficiency than traditional solar cells. The nanoantennas target mid-infrared rays, which the Earth continuously radiates as heat after absorbing energy from the sun during the day; also double-sided nanoantenna sheets can harvest energy from different parts of the Sun's spectrum. In contrast, traditional solar cells can only use visible light, rendering them idle after dark.

Since 2012 the group of Roberto Germano is working on the Oxhydroelectric effect, which generates voltage and electric current in pure liquid water, after creating a physical (not chemical) asymmetry in the liquid water e.g. thanks to a strongly hydrophile polymer, such as Nafion. This research group is based in Naples, Italy, the research started as a side project in Germano's "technology transfer company" Promete s.r.l. and since 2023 it is conducted in Oxhy s.r.l., a startup created with the purpose to further develop this line of research.

== UV solar cells ==
Japan's National Institute of Advanced Industrial Science and Technology (AIST) has succeeded in developing a transparent solar cell that uses ultraviolet (UV) light to generate electricity but allows visible light to pass through it. Most conventional solar cells use visible and infrared light to generate electricity. Used to replace conventional window glass, the installation surface area could be large, leading to potential uses that take advantage of the combined functions of power generation, lighting and temperature control.

This transparent, UV-absorbing system was achieved by using an organic-inorganic heterostructure made of the p-type semiconducting polymer PEDOT:PSS film deposited on a Nb-doped strontium titanate substrate. PEDOT:PSS is easily fabricated into thin films due to its stability in air and its solubility in water. These solar cells are only activated in the UV region and result in a relatively high quantum yield of 16% electron/photon. Future work in this technology involves replacing the strontium titanate substrate with a strontium titanate film deposited on a glass substrate in order to achieve a low-cost, large-area manufacture.

Since then, other methods have been discovered to include the UV wavelengths in solar cell power generation. Some companies report using nano-phosphors as a transparent coating to turn UV light into visible light. Others have reported extending the absorption range of single-junction photovoltaic cells by doping a wide band gap transparent semiconductor such as GaN with a transition metal such as manganese.

== Flexible solar cell research ==
Flexible solar cell research is a research-level technology, an example of which was created at the Massachusetts Institute of Technology in which solar cells are manufactured by depositing photovoltaic material on flexible substrates, such as ordinary paper, using chemical vapor deposition technology. The technology for manufacturing solar cells on paper was developed by a group of researchers from the Massachusetts Institute of Technology with support from the National Science Foundation and the Eni-MIT Alliance Solar Frontiers Program.

== 3D solar cells ==
Three-dimensional solar cells that capture nearly all of the light that strikes them and could boost the efficiency of photovoltaic systems while reducing their size, weight and mechanical complexity are under development. The new 3D solar cells, created at the Georgia Tech Research Institute, capture photons from sunlight using an array of miniature "tower" structures that resemble high-rise buildings in a city street grid. Solar3D, Inc. plans to commercialize such 3D cells, but its technology is currently patent-pending.

=== Luminescent solar concentrator ===
Luminescent solar concentrators convert sunlight or other sources of light into preferred frequencies; they concentrate the output for conversion into desirable forms of power, such as electricity. They rely on luminescence, typically fluorescence, in media such as liquids, glasses, or plastics treated with a suitable coating or dopant. The structures are configured to direct the output from a large input area onto a small converter, where the concentrated energy generates photoelectricity. The objective is to collect light over a large area at low cost; luminescent concentrator panels can be made cheaply from materials such as glasses or plastics, while photovoltaic cells are high-precision, high-technology devices, and accordingly expensive to construct in large sizes.

Research is in progress at universities such as Radboud University Nijmegen and Delft University of Technology. For example, at Massachusetts Institute of Technology researchers have developed approaches for conversion of windows into sunlight concentrators for generation of electricity. They paint a mixture of dyes onto a pane of glass or plastic. The dyes absorb sunlight and re-emit it as fluorescence within the glass, where it is confined by internal reflection, emerging at the edges of the glass, where it encounters solar cells optimized for conversion of such concentrated sunlight. The concentration factor is about 40, and the optical design yields a solar concentrator that unlike lens-based concentrators, need not be directed accurately at the sun, and can produce output even from diffuse light. Covalent Solar is working on commercialization of the process.

== Metamaterials ==
Metamaterials are heterogeneous materials employing the juxtaposition of many microscopic elements, giving rise to properties not seen in ordinary solids. Using these, it may become possible to fashion solar cells that are excellent absorbers over a narrow range of wavelengths. High absorption in the microwave regime has been demonstrated, but not yet in the 300-1100-nm wavelength regime.

== Photovoltaic thermal hybrid ==
Some systems combine photovoltaic with thermal solar, with the advantage that the thermal solar part carries heat away and cools the photovoltaic cells. Keeping temperature down lowers the resistance and improves the cell efficiency.

== Penta-based photovoltaics ==
Pentacene-based photovoltaics are claimed to improve the energy-efficiency ratio to up to 95%, effectively doubling the efficiency of today's most efficient techniques.

== Intermediate band ==
Intermediate band photovoltaics in solar cell research provides methods for exceeding the Shockley–Queisser limit on the efficiency of a cell. It introduces an intermediate band (IB) energy level in between the valence and conduction bands. Theoretically, introducing an IB allows two photons with energy less than the bandgap to excite an electron from the valence band to the conduction band. This increases the induced photocurrent and thereby efficiency.

Luque and Marti first derived a theoretical limit for an IB device with one midgap energy level using detailed balance. They assumed no carriers were collected at the IB and that the device was under full concentration. They found the maximum efficiency to be 63.2%, for a bandgap of 1.95eV with the IB 0.71eV from either the valence or conduction band. Under one sun illumination the limiting efficiency is 47%.
