= Henry Lai (scientist) =

Henry Lai is a bioengineering professor emeritus at the University of Washington, and former editor-in-chief of Electromagnetic Biology and Medicine. Lai published research in 1995 that concluded that low-level microwave radiation caused DNA damage in rat brains.

== Research ==
Lai earned a B.S. in physiology from McGill University in 1971 and came to the University of Washington in 1972, where he earned a doctorate in Psychology in 1977. Lai and a fellow researcher, Narendra "N. P." Singh, were looking at the effects of nonionizing microwave radiation the same type of radiation emitted by cell phones on the DNA of rats. They used a level of radiation considered safe by government standards and found that the DNA in the brain cells of the rats was damaged—or broken by exposure to the radiation. Lai has stated that cell phones were not subject of concern when he performed the initial studies. Funded initially by the Office of Naval Research, Lai was investigating how radar, which emits radio-frequency radiation, affects the health of operators. “We did not really pay attention to the importance of this thing,” he recalls. But during his research, cell phone company Motorola Inc. indicated that someone had told the company about Lai’s unpublished results. Motorola asked to meet with him in his lab and at a meeting in Copenhagen.

Lai and Singh have published research on the effects of artemisinin on cancer. Lai with Singh and HW Chan, have also published research that frequencies emitted by RFID chips are capable of retarding the growth of several types of cancer cells.

Lai and Singh claim that Motorola attempted to discredit their low-level microwave radiation findings in order to suppress them. Lai and Singh further argue that cell phone proponents have funded their own research to confuse the subject and mitigate the influence of independent research results while suppressing further research perceived as harmful to the cell phone industry. Motorola has denied suppressing Lai's research.
