= Ten Brink =

Ten Brink is a Dutch toponymic surname originally meaning "at the village green". Variations include Ten Brinke and Tenbrink. People with this name include

- Bernhard Egidius Konrad ten Brink (1841–1892) Dutch-born German philologist
- Conrad ten Brink (1875–1938), Australian footballer
- Jan ten Brink (1834–1901), Dutch writer
- Jules ten Brink (1838–1889), Dutch composer active in France
- Robert ten Brink (born 1955), Dutch television personality

== See also ==
- Van den Brink, Dutch surname with a similar origin
- Brink (surname)
