= Sergio Fubini =

Italian theoretical physicist (1928–2005)

- Born: 31 December 1928; Turin
- Died: 6 January 2005 (aged 76); Nyon
- Education: University of Turin
- Awards: Dannie Heineman Prize (1968)
- Scientific career
- Fields: Physics
- Doctoral advisor: Gleb Wataghin

Sergio Fubini (31 December 1928 – 6 January 2005) was an Italian theoretical physicist. He was one of the pioneers of string theory. He was engaged in peace activism in the Middle East.

== Biography ==
Fubini was born in Turin. In 1938, he fled the country as a politically persecuted Jew to Switzerland. In 1945, he attended the Lycée in Turin, where he studied physics and in 1950 graduated "cum laude." Afterwards, he was an assistant in Turin. From 1954 to 1957, he was in the USA. From 1958 to 1967, he was at CERN in Geneva. In 1959, he became a professor of nuclear physics at University of Padua. In 1961, he became a professor of theoretical physics at University of Turin. From 1968 to 1973, he was at MIT, but taught summer courses in Turin. He went back to CERN in 1973 and was from 1971 to 1980 a member of the advisory board and had an important role in planning the Large Electron Positron Collider (LEP) as well as in discussions for the construction of the Middle East's Synchrotron, SESAME.

At MIT, he was with Gabriele Veneziano, Emilio Del Giudice and Paolo Di Vecchia at the centre of an active school of theoretical physicists with close connections to Italy (with one of the Italian INFN and MIT financed "Bruno Rossi" exchange programs). He and his co-workers did fundamental work in string theory. Other well-known MIT colleagues at that time were Victor Weisskopf (who was recruited by Fubini to MIT), Steven Weinberg and Roman Jackiw. From 1994 to 2001, he was a professor in Turin. Fubini worked in the 1960s on current algebras and S-matrix theory (Regge trajectories among other things), in particular on their field-theoretical foundations. In the 1970s, he was with his MIT colleagues and pupils Gabriele Veneziano, Emilio Del Giudice and Paolo Di Vecchia one of the pioneers of string theory (the team introduced the so-called DDF states). He worked in the 1970s on other classical solutions of Yang–Mills equations and conformally invariant quantum field theory.

Fubini died in 2005 in Nyon. He married Marina Colombo in 1956 and had a daughter with her.

== Honors ==
Fubini received the Dannie Heineman Prize for Mathematical Physics in 1968 and received an honorary doctorate from the University of Heidelberg.
