= IJsselstein =

City and municipality in Utrecht, Netherlands

- City and Municipality
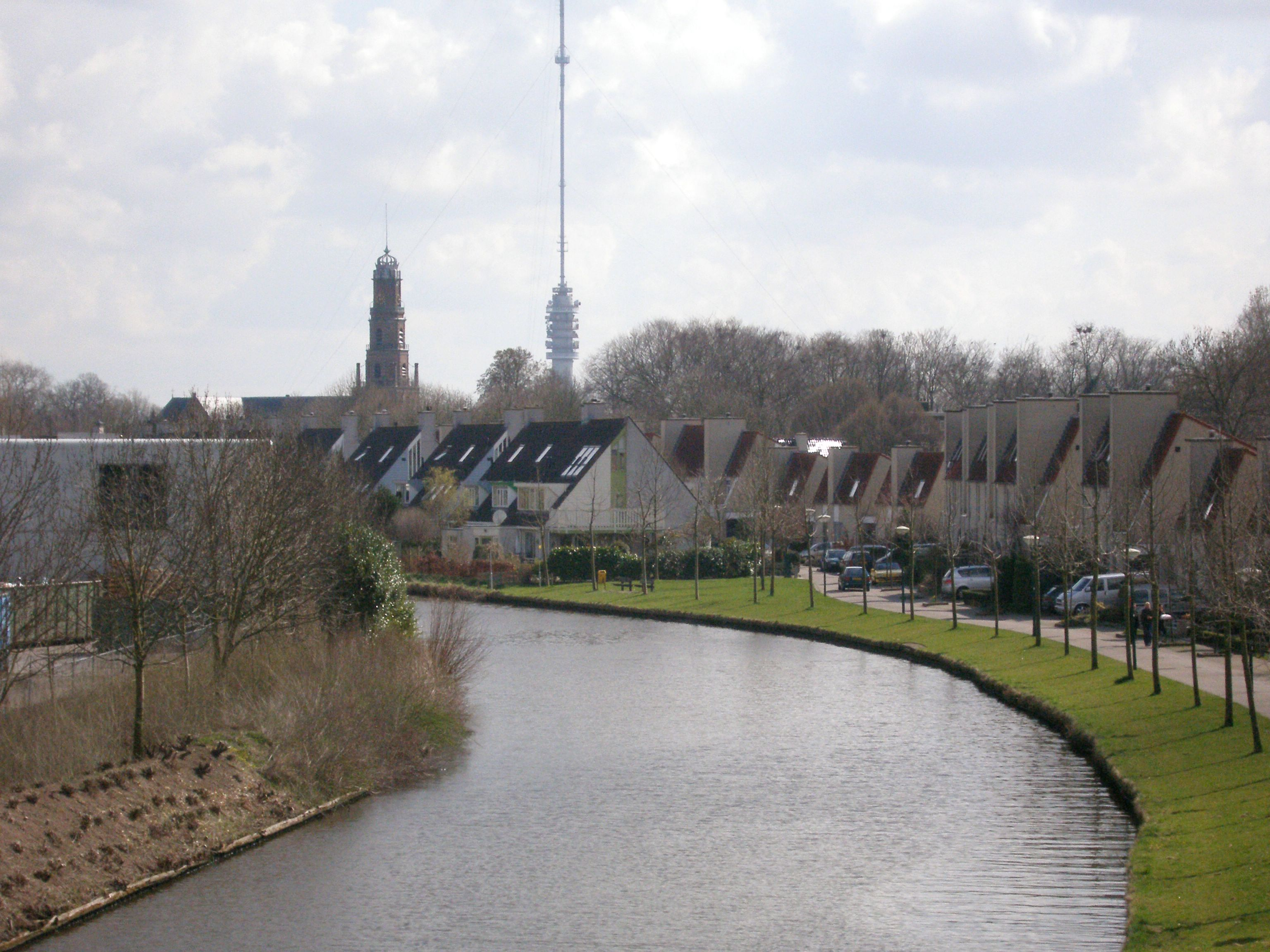
- Hollandse IJssel through IJsselstein with church and Gerbrandy Tower in background

- Flag Coat of arms

- Location in Utrecht
- Coordinates: 52°1′N 5°2′E
- Country: Netherlands
- Province: Utrecht

Government
  - Body: Municipal council
  - Mayor: Ester Weststeijn

Area
  - Total: 21.68 km^{2} (8.37 sq mi)
  - Land: 21.07 km^{2} (8.14 sq mi)
  - Water: 0.61 km^{2} (0.24 sq mi)
- Elevation: 1 m (3.3 ft)

Population (January 2021)
  - Total: 33,819
  - Density: 1,605/km^{2} (4,160/sq mi)
- Demonym: IJsselsteiner(s)
- Time zone: UTC+1 (CET)
  - Summer (DST): UTC+2 (CEST)
- Postcode: 3400–3404
- Area code: 030
- Website: www.ijsselstein.nl

IJsselstein (Dutch pronunciation: [ˈɛisəlstɛin]) is a municipality and city in the Netherlands, in the province of Utrecht. IJsselstein received city rights in 1331. IJsselstein owes its name to the river Hollandse IJssel which flows through the city. It is a major commuting suburb for the Utrecht area, along with the neighbouring towns Houten and Nieuwegein (in part due to the Sneltram light rail line serving the area). It is surrounded by the municipalities of Utrecht, Montfoort, Lopik, Vijfheerenlanden and Nieuwegein.

== Sights ==
The city has an old town, surrounded by a small canal. A castle stood in IJsselstein from 1300 to 1888; the tower survived. The city has two large churches, both named after St. Nicholas: the Dutch Reformed Nicolaas church, founded in 1310, and a Roman Catholic church. Inside the Protestant church there are two mausoleums; one of the family of Gijsbrecht van Amstel (1350) and another of Aleida van Culemborg (1475). The catholic basilica of St. Nicolaas dates from 1887 and is neo-Gothic. It was given the title of 'Basilica Minor' by Pope Paul VI in 1972.

A 366.8 metres high television mast, called the Gerbrandy Tower, is located in IJsselstein. The tower is commonly, and erroneously, referred to as Zendmast Lopik, after the nearby village of Lopik.

== Topography ==
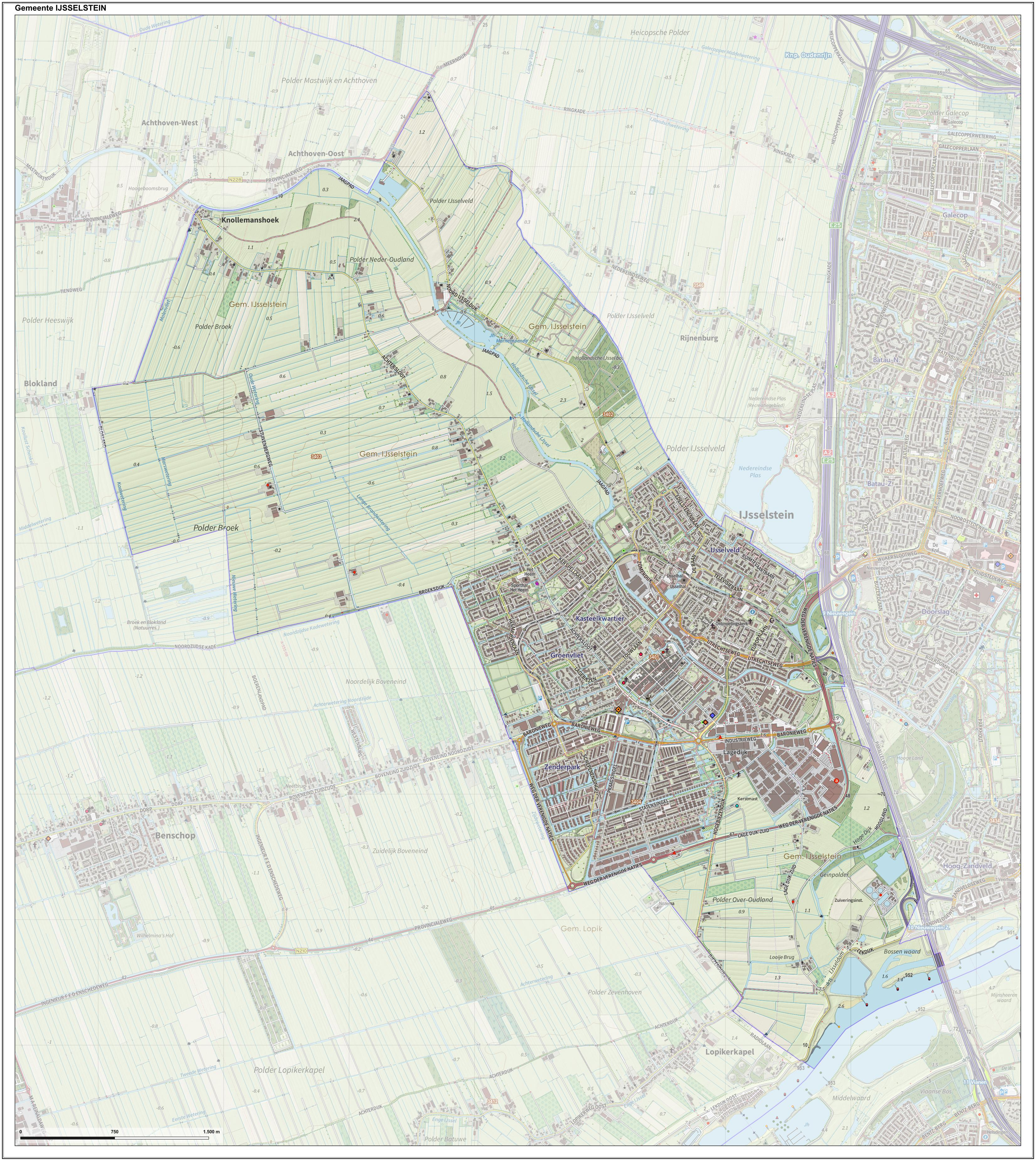
Dutch Topographic map of the municipality of IJsselstein, June 2015

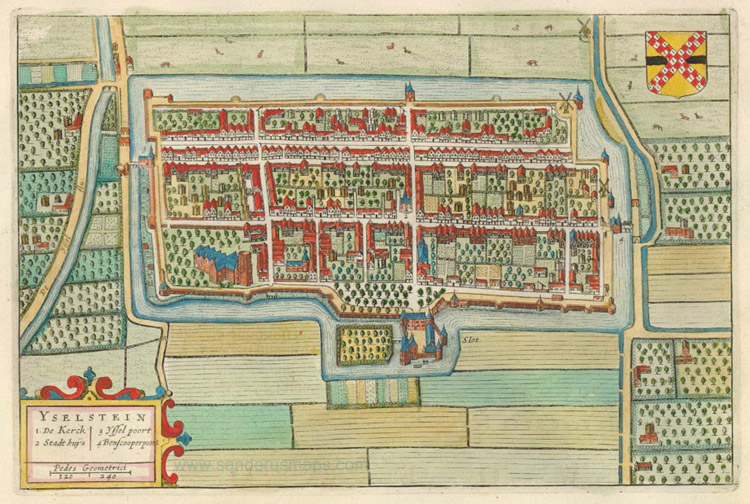
1649 map of IJsselstein in Willem and Joan Blaeu's "Toonneel der Steden"

== Notable people ==
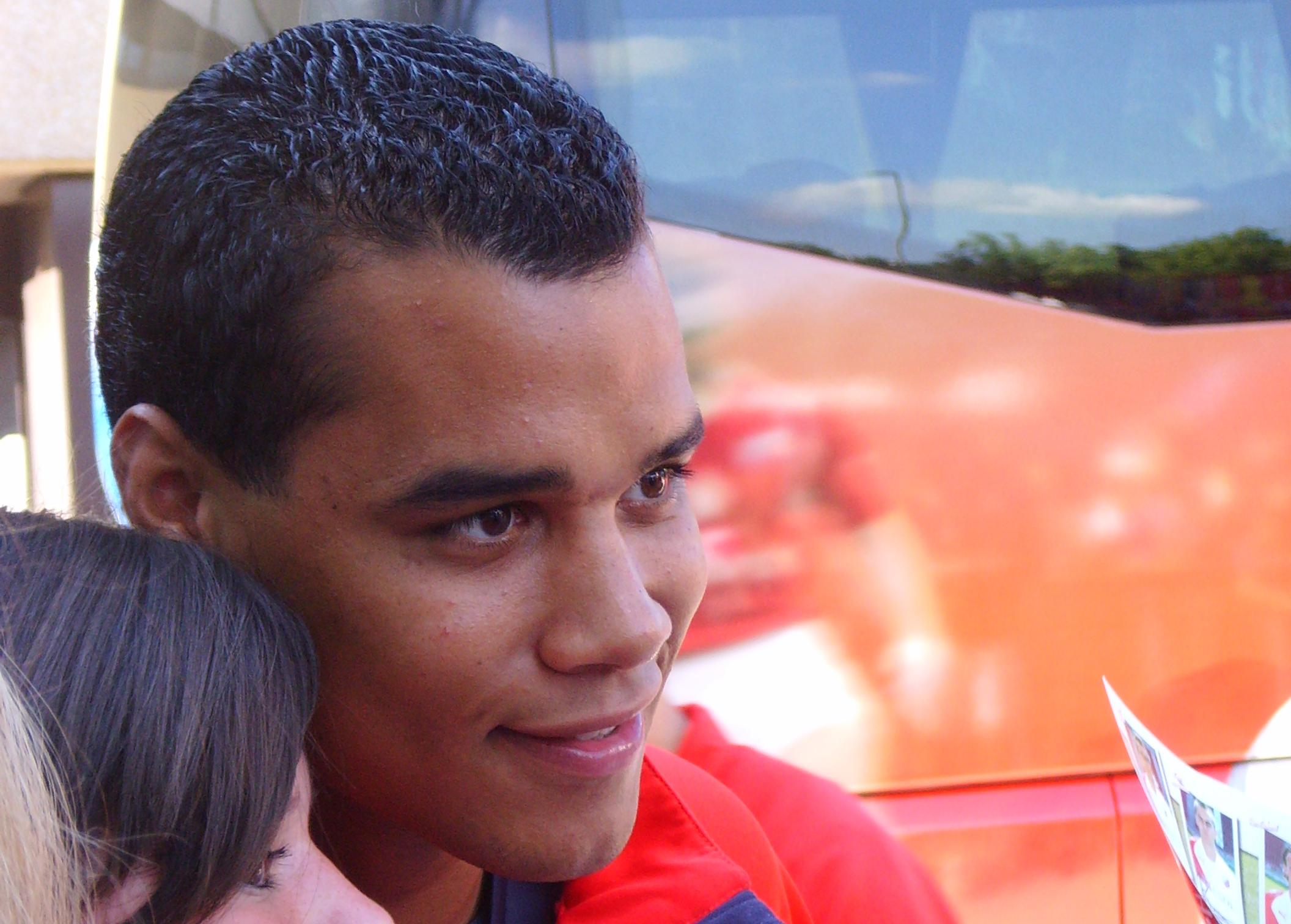
Michel Vorm, 2007

- Arnold, Lord of IJsselstein (1304–1363), the second Lord of IJsselstein and Stoutenburg
- Maximiliaan of Egmont (1509–1548), Count of Buren and Leerdam, and the Stadtholder of Friesland 1540 to 1548
- Patrick van den Brink (born 1967), a former mayor of IJsselstein
- Marijke van Beukering-Huijbregts (born 1971), a former alderwoman of IJsselstein
- Michel Vorm (born 1983), a retired football goalkeeper
- Nicki Pouw-Verweij (born 1991), a physician and politician
- Lieke van Lexmond (born 1982), an actress, model and TV host

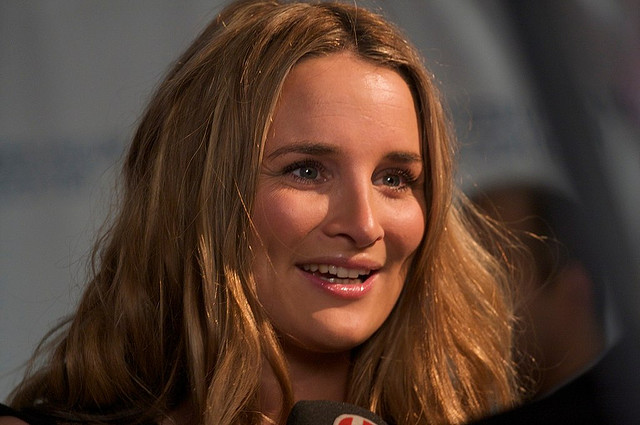
Lieke van Lexmond, 2009

== Gallery ==
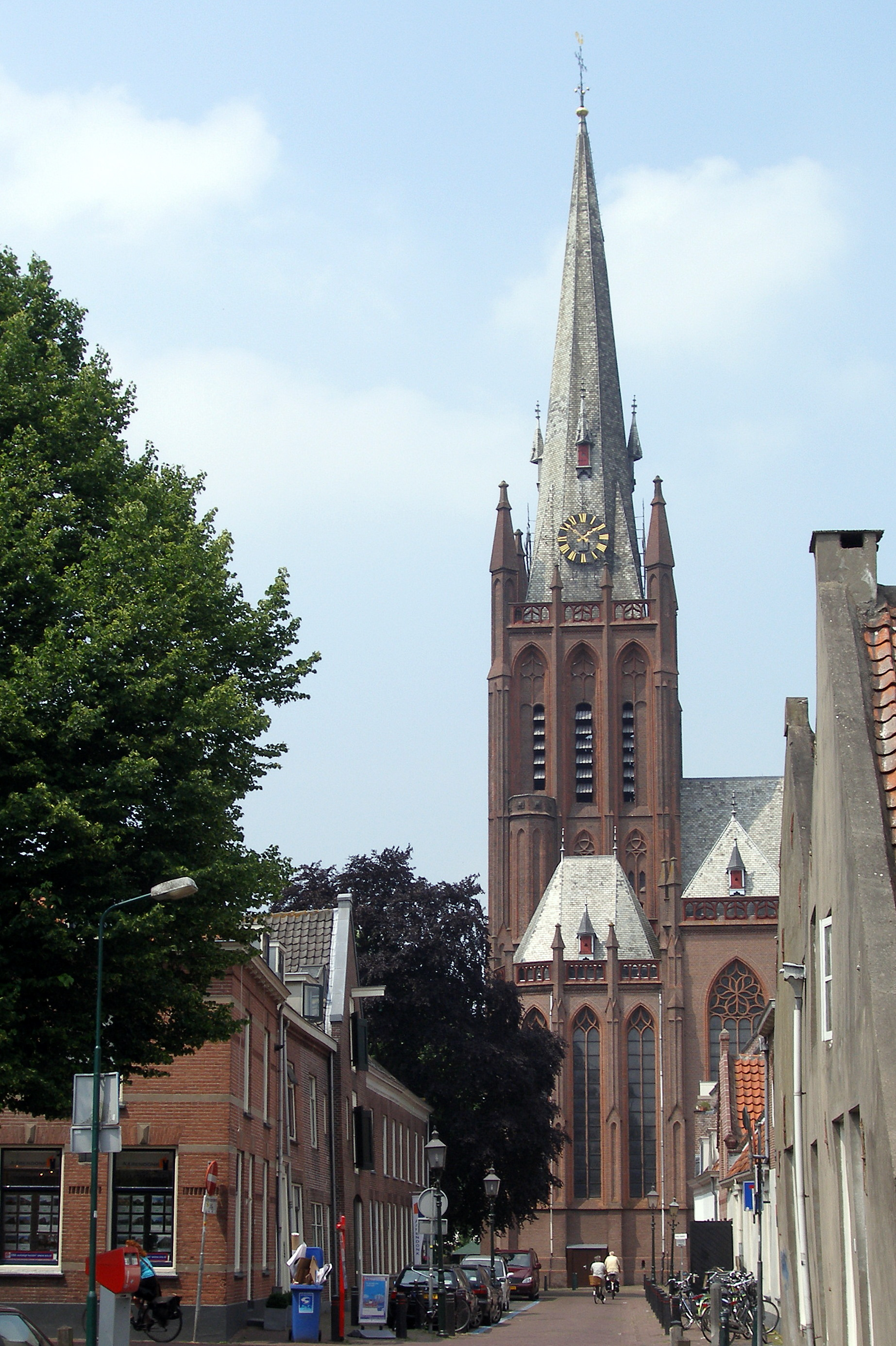
Catholic basilica

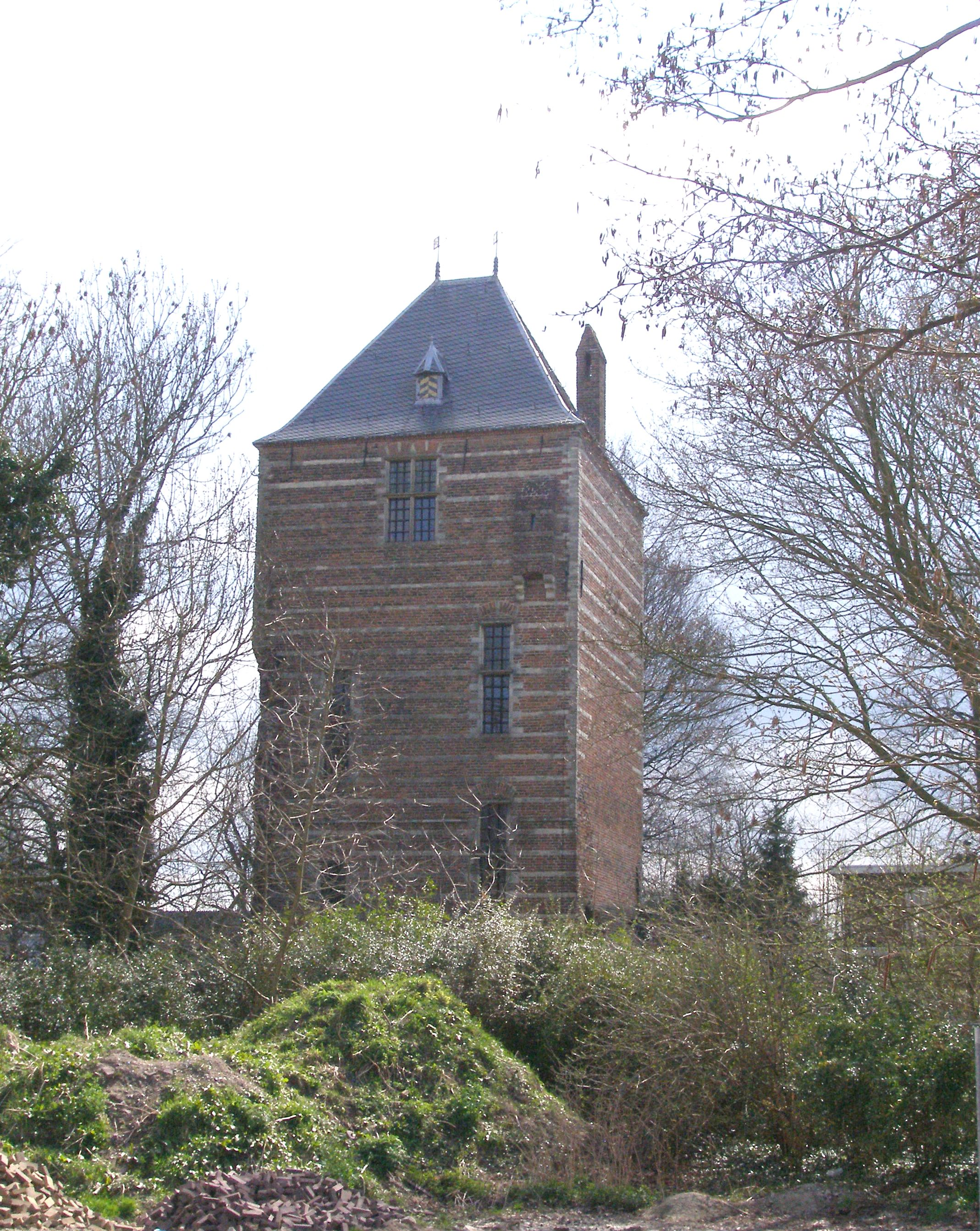
Tower of the former castle

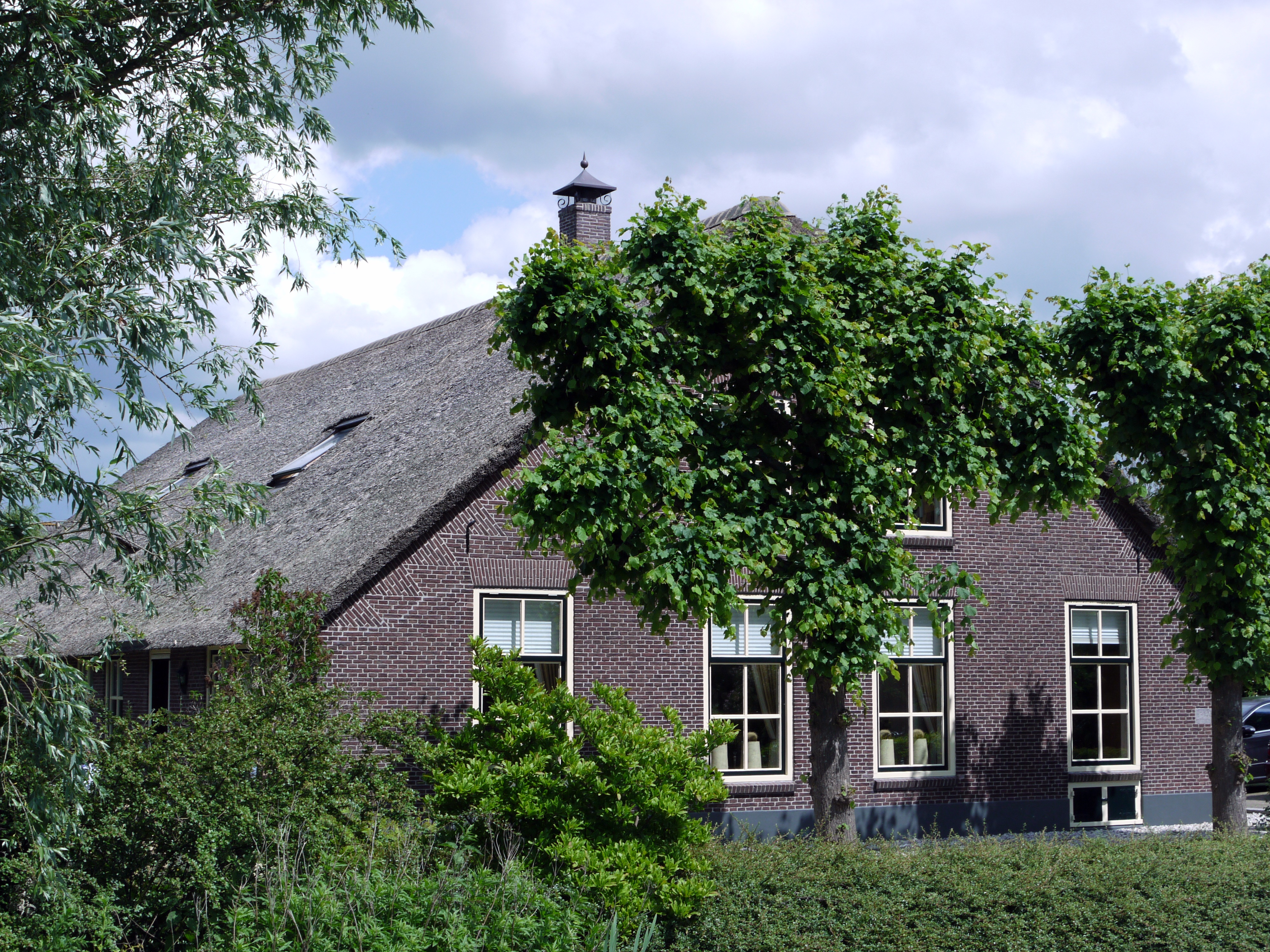
Achtersloot 120, IJsselstein

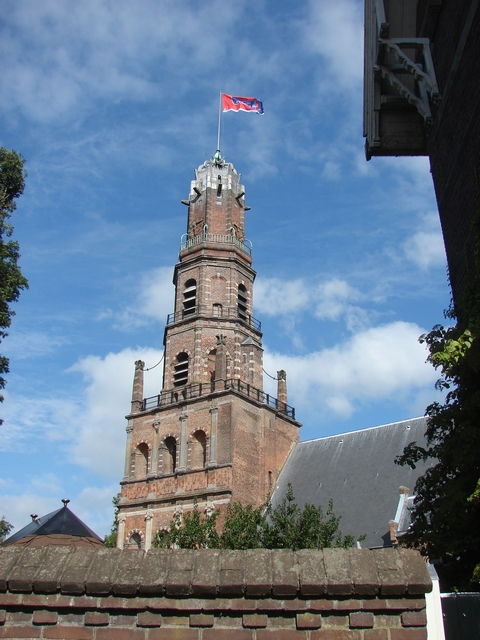
Protestant church

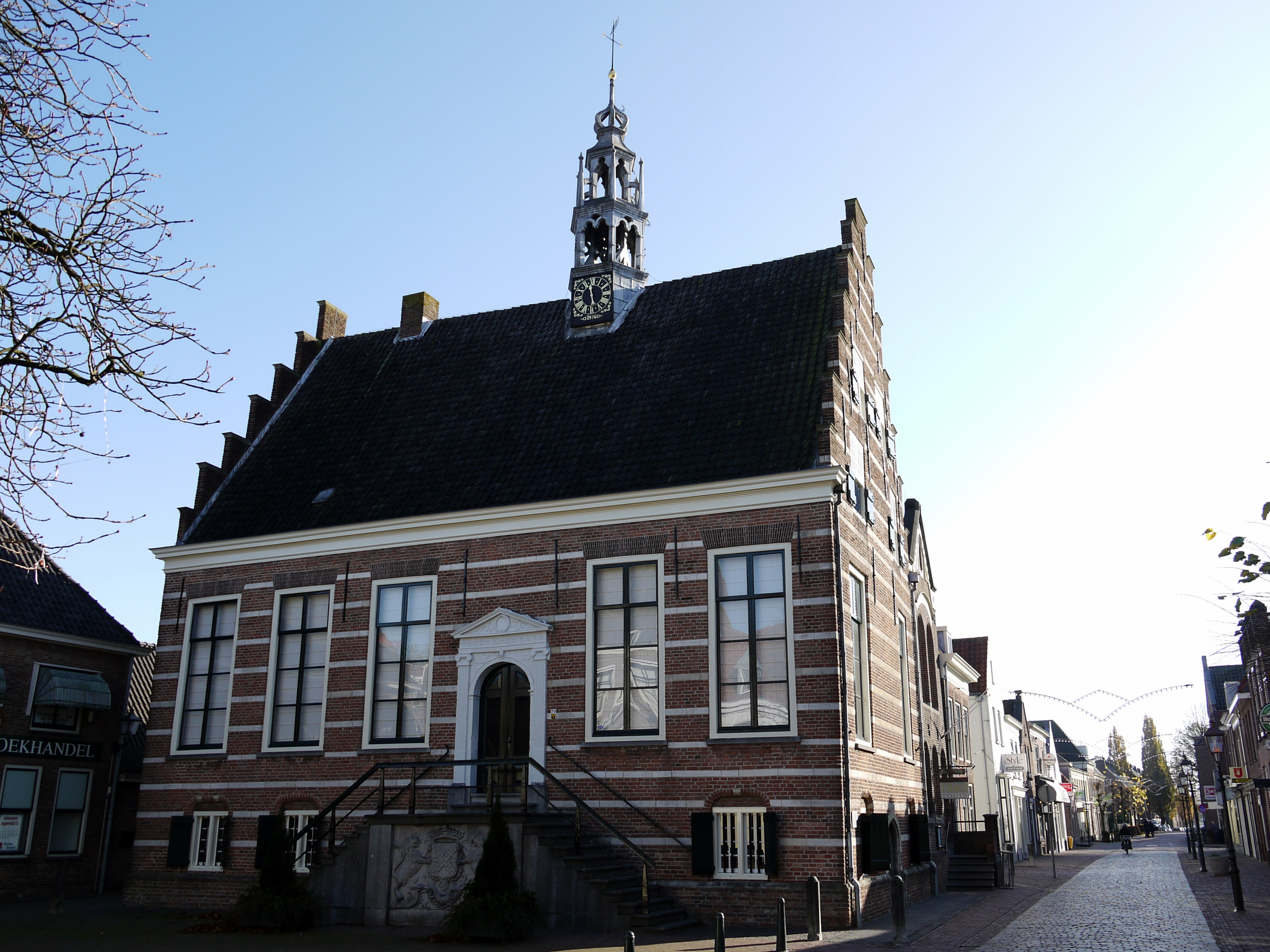
Historisch Stadhuis, IJsselstein
