= Gabriele Veneziano =

Italian theoretical physicist

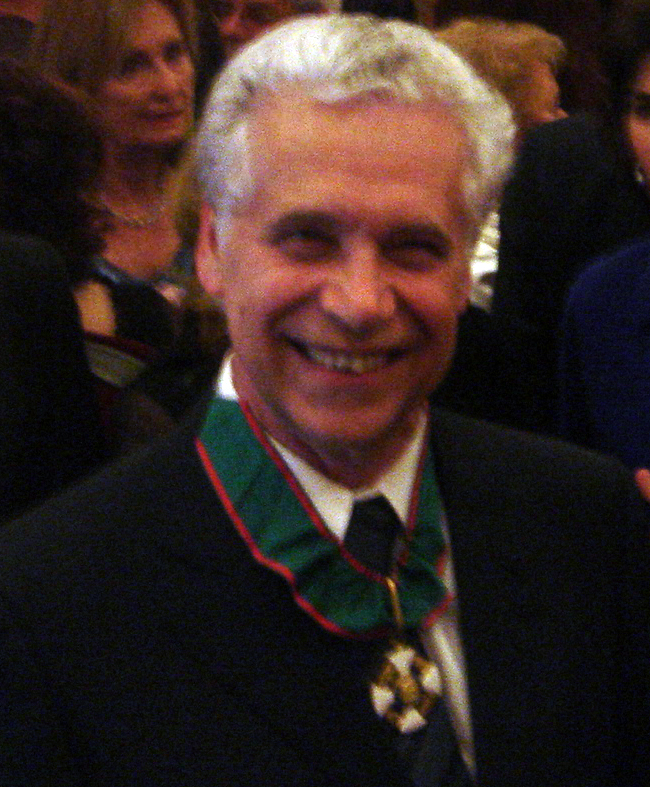
- Veneziano in 2007
- Born: 7 September 1942 (age 83); Florence, Italy
- Education: University of Florence; Weizmann Institute of Science
- Known for: Veneziano amplitude Witten–Veneziano mechanism String theory String cosmology
- Awards: Dirac Medal (2014); James Joyce Award (2009); Tomassoni award (2009); Oskar Klein Memorial Lecture (2007); Albert Einstein Medal (2006); Enrico Fermi Prize (2005); Heineman Prize (2004); Pomeranchuk Prize (1999); Racah Lecture (1975)
- Scientific career
- Fields: Theoretical physics
- Workplaces: CERN; Collège de France

Gabriele Veneziano (/ˌvɛnɪtsiˈɑːnoʊ/ VEN-it-see-AH-noh; Italian: [ɡabriˈɛːle venetˈtsjaːno]; born 7 September 1942) is an Italian theoretical physicist widely considered the father of string theory. He has conducted most of his scientific activities at CERN in Geneva, Switzerland, and held the Chair of Elementary Particles, Gravitation and Cosmology at the Collège de France in Paris from 2004 to 2013, until the age of retirement there.

== Life ==
Gabriele Veneziano was born in Florence. In 1965 he earned his Laurea in Theoretical Physics from the University of Florence under the direction of Raoul Gatto. He pursued his doctoral studies at the Weizmann Institute of Science in Rehovot, Israel and obtained his PhD in 1967 under the supervision of Hector Rubinstein. During his stay in Israel, he collaborated, among others, with Marco Ademollo (a professor in Florence) and Miguel Virasoro (an Argentinian physicist who later became a professor in Italy). During his years at MIT he collaborated with many colleagues, primarily with Sergio Fubini (an MIT professor, later a member of the Theory Division and of the Directorate at CERN in Geneva, Switzerland).

Between 1968 and 1972 he worked at MIT and was a summer visitor of the Theory Division at CERN. In 1972 he accepted the Amos de Shalit Professor of Physics chair at the Weizmann Institute of Science in Rehovot, Israel. In 1976–1978 he accepted a permanent position in the Theory Division at CERN in Geneva, Switzerland, a position that he held until the age of retirement in 2007 and where he has been since then Honorary member. Between 1994 and 1997 he was Director of the Theory Division. He also held the chair of Elementary Particles, Gravitation and Cosmology at the College of France in Paris (2004–2013), of which he is currently an Honorary Professor. He has visited many universities all over the world. More recently he was a Global Distinguished Professor at New York University and a Sackler Professor at Tel-Aviv University.

== Research ==
Gabriele Veneziano first formulated the foundations of string theory in 1968 when he discovered a string picture that could describe the interaction of strongly interacting particles. Veneziano discovered that the Euler Beta function, interpreted as a scattering amplitude, has many of the features needed to explain the physical properties of strongly interacting particles. This amplitude, known as the Veneziano amplitude, is interpreted as the scattering amplitude for four open string tachyons. In retrospect, this work is now considered the founding of string theory although at the time it was not apparent the string picture would lead to a new theory of quantum gravity.

Veneziano's work led to intense research to try to explain the strong force by a field theory of strings about one fermi in length. The rise of quantum chromodynamics, a rival explanation of the strong force, led to a temporary loss of interest in string theories until the 1980s, when interest was revived.

In 1991 he published a paper that shows how an inflationary cosmological model can be obtained from string theory, thus opening the door to a description of string cosmological pre-big bang scenarios.

== Society memberships ==
- National Academy of Sciences of Turin (1994)
- Lincei National Academy (1996)
- French Academy of Sciences (2002)

== Awards ==
- Pomeranchuk Prize, 1999
- Gold medal della Repubblica Italiana come Benemerito della Cultura, 2000
- Dannie Heineman Prize for Mathematical Physics, from the American Physical Society, 2004
- Enrico Fermi Prize from the Italian Physical Society, 2005
- Albert Einstein Medal, Albert Einstein Institute, Bern, Switzerland, 2006
- Oskar Klein Medal, 2007
- Commendatore al merito della Repubblica Italiana, 2007
- James Joyce Award, University College Dublin, 2009
- Felice Pietro Chisesi and Caterina Tomassoni Prize, 2009
- Dirac Medal by ICTP, 2014
- Honorary doctorate, Swansea University, 2015
- Friedel-Volterra Prize, by SIF and SFP, 2016–2017
