= Patrick van den Brink =

Dutch politician and civil servant

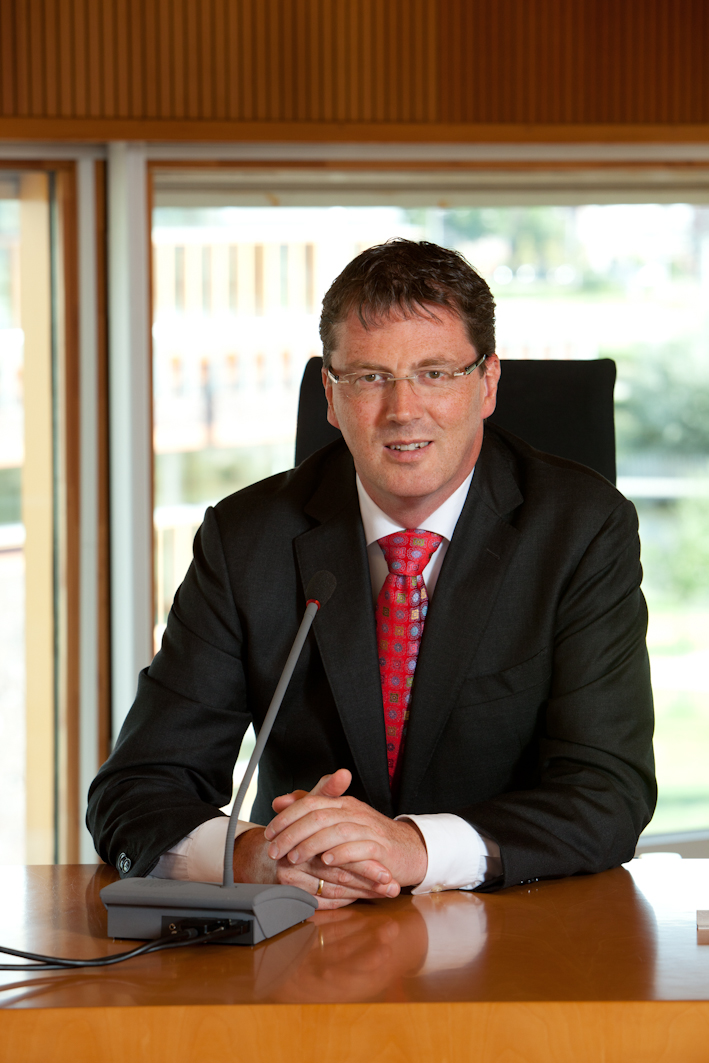
Patrick van den Brink

P.C. (Patrick) van den Brink (born 6 November 1967 in Hilversum) is a Dutch politician and former civil servant. He is a member of the Christian Democratic Appeal (Christen-Democratisch Appèl).

From 15 May 2007 until 2014 he was mayor of IJsselstein, which is a municipality of the province of Utrecht. From 2001 till April 2006 he was an alderman of Hilversum, which is a municipality of the province of North Holland.
