= Vandenbrink GTO =

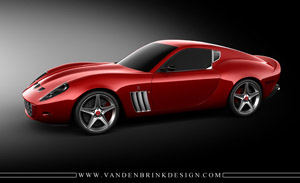
Vandenbrink 599/630 GTO (rendering)

The Vandenbrink GTO is a limited re-bodied version of the Ferrari 599 GTB Fiorano. This means an entirely new coachwork, designed by Michiel van den Brink of Vandenbrink Design, is fitted on the stripped chassis and drivetrain of a Ferrari 599 GTB production car. The car's styling is inspired by the 1962 Ferrari 250 GTO as a tribute.

The new coachworks are to be handcrafted in aluminium by Italian coachbuilding partners.

Only 12 GTO's are planned to be built.
