= Vandenbrink Design =

Dutch automotive design company

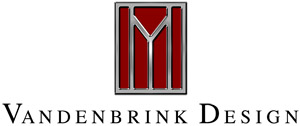
- Type: Private
- Industry: Automotive
- Founded: 2006; 20 years ago
- Headquarters: Amsterdam, Netherlands
- Services: Custom design and coachbuilding
- Website: www.vandenbrinkdesign.com

Vandenbrink Design is a Netherlands-based automotive design and coachbuilding company, founded in 2006 by Michiel van den Brink and Robert Koumans.

== Cars ==
In 2006, Van den Brink introduced a plan to design and build a special coachbuilt Ferrari, which received positive reception.

In April 2010, Van den Brink left the company to become an independent designer, leaving the firm to his business partner Robert Koumans.

Currently the company is working on the "Vandenbrink GTO", a tribute to the 1962 Ferrari 250 GTO, based on the underpinnings of the Ferrari 599 GTB Fiorano. Coachbuilding will be performed by Italian partners. Production will be limited to 12 cars.

In 2019 the design for a Shooting Brake based on a Ferrari 612 Scaglietti was realised. The Vandenbrink 612 Shooting Brake was purchased by a well known Ferrari-collector.
