= Lars Brink =

Swedish theoretical physicist (1943–2022)

- Lars Elof Gustaf Brink
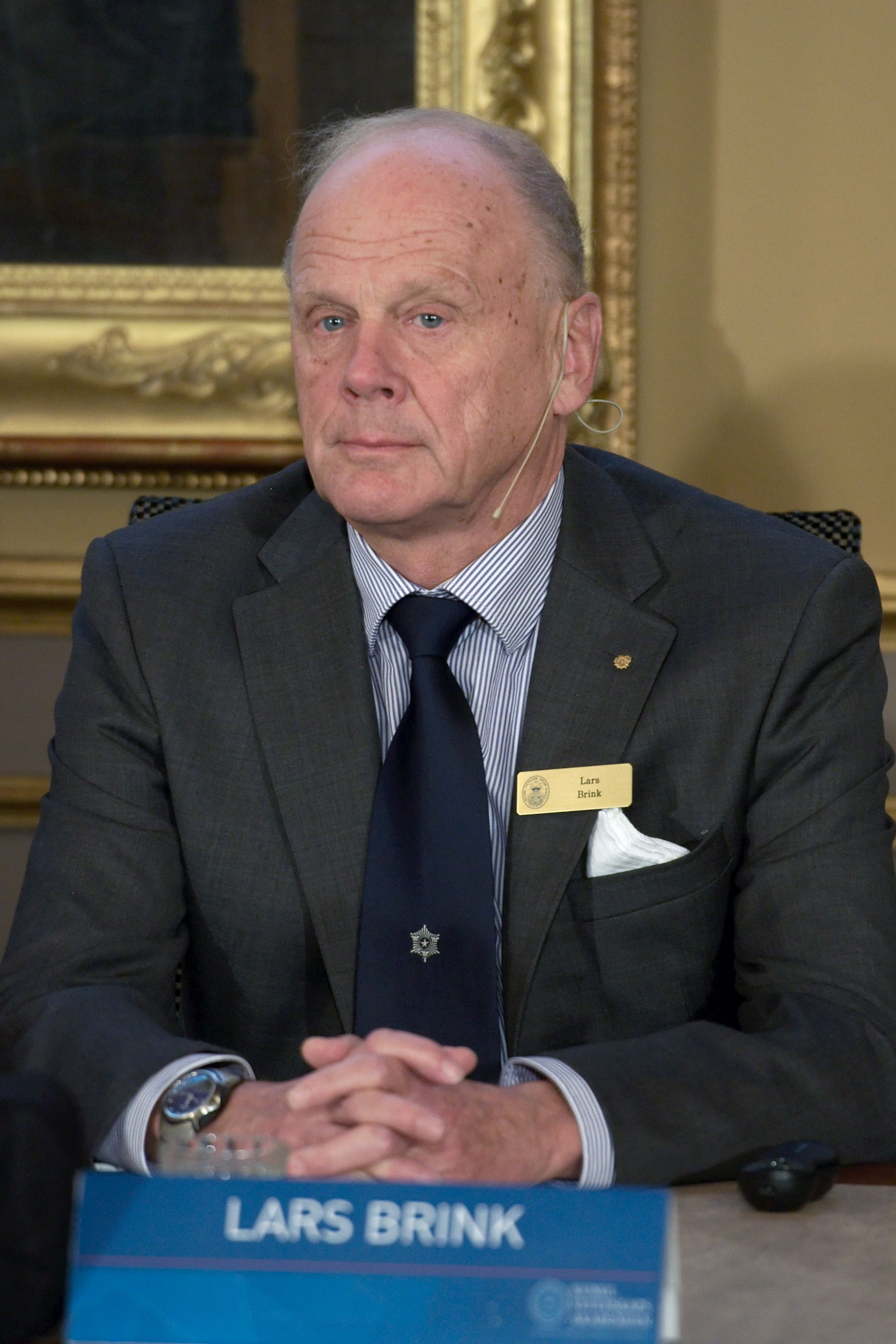
- Born: November 12, 1943
- Died: 29 October 2022 (aged 78)
- Citizenship: Swedish
- Education: University of Gothenburg
- Known for: Supersymmetric Yang-Mills theory, superstrings
- Scientific career
- Doctoral advisor: Jan S. Nilsson
- Doctoral students: Ingemar Bengtsson, Martin Cederwall, Bengt EW Nilsson

Lars Elof Gustaf Brink (12 November 1943 - 29 October 2022) was a Swedish theoretical physicist.

He made significant and well-cited contributions in supersymmetry, supergravity, superspace, and superstrings, and the connections among them. In 1977, with John Schwarz and Joël Scherk, he introduced the first supersymmetric Yang-Mills theories.

During 1971–1973, he was member of the theory group at CERN.

Starting in 1986, he had been professor of theoretical physics at Chalmers Institute of Technology in Gothenburg. Brink was one of the pioneers of superstring theory, since the 1970s (at CERN and Caltech). He coordinated the EU network Superstring Theory 1991–1995 and 2000–2008.

In 1997 he became a member of the Royal Swedish Academy of Sciences.

In 2001, 2004 and from 2008 to 2013 he was a member of the Nobel Committee for Physics and its chairman in 2013.
