= David Brink (businessman) =

South African businessman

- Born: David Charles Brink; 9 August 1939 (age 87)
- Education: University of the Witwatersrand, London School of Economics
- Title: Board member
- Board member of: Absa Group, Sanlam, Sappi, BHP

David Charles Brink (born 9 August 1939) is a South African businessman and sits on the boards of a number of large companies.

Brink followed his father's footsteps by going into mining, he joined Anglo American from 1962 and was appointed section manager of Western Deep Levels in 1967. He completed a master's degree in mining engineering at the University of the Witwatersrand. In 1970, he left Anglo American and joined Murray & Roberts as the manager of RUC Mining Contracting Company and by 1974 he was appointed managing director. Brink work himself up the "corporate ladder", 1983 – chief executive of Murray & Roberts Industrial, 1984 – chief operating Officer of Murray & Roberts Holdings Ltd, 1986 – chief executive of the Murray & Roberts Group and in July 1994 he was appointed chairman of Murray & Roberts Holdings Ltd which he held until he retired in December 2003.

Offices he is currently or recently held:

- Murray & Roberts – Director (July 1984 – December 2003)
- Absa Group – Deputy Chairman (April 1992 – present)
- Sanlam – Director (January 1994 – present)
- Sappi – Non-executive Director (March 1994 – present)
- BHP – Director (June 1997 – present)
- Unitrans – Chairman (November 1997 – present)
- South African Institute of Directors – Vice President
- National Business Initiative – Board member
- Business Trust – Co-chairman
- Trustees of the South African Nature Foundation – Board member
