= Wessex Institute of Technology =

Educational institute in Ashurst, Hampshire, England

Coordinates: 50.8789°N 1.5259°W

- Chairman: Alexander Carlos Brebbia
- Location: Ashurst, New Forest, England, United Kingdom
- Website: http://www.wessex.ac.uk/
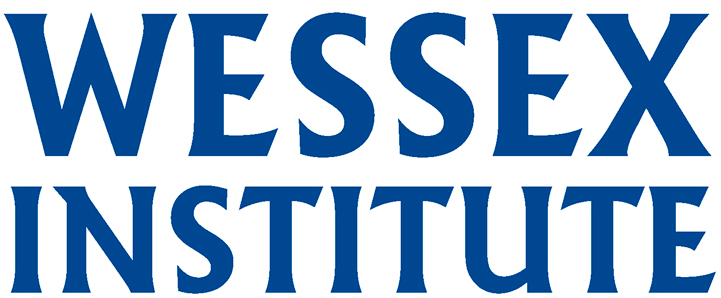

The Wessex Institute of Technology (usually referred to as just Wessex Institute or WIT) is an educational and research institute. WIT is located at Ashurst Lodge in the New Forest National Park, in the South of England.

Carlos Brebbia established the Wessex Institute of Technology in 1986 which succeeded the Computational Mechanics Institute formed in 1981. He held the role of Chairman until his death on Saturday 3 March 2018.

The Wessex Institute’s activities are divided into 3 core areas: Research, Conferences and Publishing.

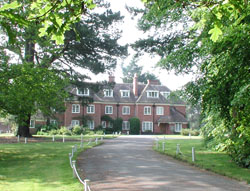
WIT campus at Ashurst Lodge

== Research ==
The Wessex Institute of Technology research programmes are funded by industry and research organisations.

== International conference programme ==
The Wessex Institute of Technology organises a programme of around 15 to 20 conferences each year.

== Publishing - WIT Press ==
WIT Press is the publishing service of the Wessex Institute of Technology. Based at Ashurst Lodge, it publishes conference proceedings, journals and a number of specialised research monographs and edited works.

It was identified as a potential predatory publisher by Jeffrey Beall before the list was removed at the start of 2017.

== Controversy over peer review ==
The Wessex Institute of Technology previously organised a conference on design and nature, whilst WIT Press publishes the International Journal of Design & Nature and Ecodynamics, which has attracted attention for the subject matter of some of the papers presented and published.

Contributions to its 2004 International conference programme included a joint paper by Scott A. Minnich and Stephen C. Meyer reiterating claims disputing evolution of the bacterial flagellum. The paper was cited in the landmark Kitzmiller v. Dover Area School District legal case, being the first direct challenge brought in the United States federal courts testing a public school district policy that required the teaching of intelligent design.

Doubts have been raised as to whether proper peer review has been followed for these conferences. In particular, several nonsensical abstracts were provisionally accepted for the VIDEA conference in 1995, although they were not included in the final programme.
