= Electromagnetic Biology and Medicine =

Scientific journal

- Discipline: Bioelectromagnetics
- Language: English
- Edited by: Joseph R. Salvatore

Publication details
- Former names: Journal of Bioelectricity (1982—1992); Electro- and Magnetobiology (1992—2002)
- History: 1982—present
- Publisher: Taylor & Francis
- Frequency: Quarterly
- Impact factor: 1.5 (2024)

Standard abbreviations
- ISO 4: Electromagn. Biol. Med.

Indexing
- CODEN: EBMLCC
- ISSN: 1536-8378 (print); 1536-8386 (web)

Links
- Journal homepage; Online access; Online archive

Electromagnetic Biology and Medicine is a peer-reviewed scientific journal published quarterly by Taylor & Francis. It covers research on the biological and medical effects and applications of non-ionizing electromagnetic fields ranging from statics to 300 GHz. Established in 1982 under the name Journal of Bioelectricity, the journal was known as Electro- and Magnetobiology from 1992 to 2002, before being titled to Electromagnetic Biology and Medicine. Its current editor-in-chief is Joseph R. Salvatore (VA Medical Center).

== Abstracting and indexing ==
The journal is abstracted and indexed in:

- Biological Abstracts
- BIOSIS Previews
- EBSCO databases
- Ei Compendex
- MEDLINE
- Science Citation Index Expanded
- Scopus

According to the Journal Citation Reports, the journal has a 2024 impact factor of 1.5.
