= Exclusion zone (physics) =

Aspect of fluid dynamics

The exclusion zone is a large stratum (typically on the order of a few microns to a millimeter) observed in pure liquid water, from which particles of other materials in suspension are repelled. It is observed next to the surface of solid materials, e.g. the walls of the container in which the liquid water is held, or solid specimens immersed in it, and also at the water/air interface. Several independent research groups have reported observations of the exclusion zone next to hydrophilic surfaces. Some research groups have reported the observation of the exclusion zone next to metal surfaces. The exclusion zone has been observed using different techniques, e.g. birefringence, neutron radiography, nuclear magnetic resonance, and others, and it has potentially high importance in biology, and in engineering applications such as filtration and microfluidics.

== Historical background ==
The first observations of a different behavior of water molecules, close to the walls of its container, date back to late 1960s and early 1970s, when Walter Drost-Hansen, upon reviewing many experimental articles, came to the conclusion that interfacial water (sometimes described as "vicinal water") shows structural difference.

In 1986, Boris Derjaguin and his colleagues observed an exclusion zone next to the walls of cells.

In 2006 the group of Gerald Pollack reported their observation of what they called an exclusion zone. They observed that the particles of colloidal and molecular solutes suspended in aqueous solution are profoundly and extensively excluded from the vicinity of various hydrophilic surfaces. The exclusion zone has been observed and characterized by several independent groups since those early observations.

== Theoretical models ==
Since the early observations, several theoretical models have been proposed, to explain the experimental observation of the exclusion zone.

=== Mechanical model: Change in molecular structure ===
Some researchers suggest that the exclusion zone is due to a change in the molecular structure of water near an adjacent solid hydrophilic or metal surface. In this model, the water in the exclusion zone has a structure of hexagonal sheets, where the hydrogen atoms are positioned between oxygen atoms. Moreover, hydrogen atoms bond to the oxygen atoms lying in the layer above and below so that in total each hydrogen forms three bonds. This structure can be considered as an intermediate between ice and water. However, the hexagonal sheet hypothesis does not account for all aspects of the exclusion zone, and it is not supported by the majority of physicists.

=== Quantum electrodynamical model: quantum confinement ===
Another calculation performed describes the molecules of the exclusion zone using quantum mechanics and quantum electrodynamics. In this model the liquid bulk water is in a gaseous state. Then, above a certain density threshold and below a specific critical temperature, those molecules go to another quantum state, with lower energy. In this lower energy, coherent state, the cloud of electrons oscillate between two quantum states: a ground state, and an excited state where one electron per molecule is almost free (the binding energy is about 0.5 eV). In this coherent state the quantum superposition has a component with coefficient 0.9 of the ground state, and a component with 0.1 of the excited state. The electrons in this quantum state oscillate between the ground state and the excited state with a certain frequency, and this oscillation creates an electromagnetic field, which is confined within the super-molecular structure, so that no radiation is observed. The molecules of the structure, together with the confined electromagnetic field, constitute in this model the exclusion zone.
