= 2009–10 SC Heerenveen season =

Season of a Dutch football club

Heerenveen
2009–10 season
- Manager: Trond Sollied (until 31 August); Jan de Jonge (from 31 August to 3 February); Jan Everse (interim, from 5 February)
- Stadium: Abe Lenstra Stadion
- Eredivisie: 11th
- KNVB Cup: Fourth round
- Johan Cruyff Shield: Runners-up
- UEFA Europa League: Group stage
| Home colours | Away colours |

The 2009–10 season was Sportclub Heerenveen's 17th consecutive season in the Eredivisie and 89th year in existence as a football club. In addition to the domestic league, Heerenveen participated in that season's editions of the KNVB Cup, the Johan Cruyff Shield and the UEFA Europa League.

== Squad ==
Squad at end of season

Note: Flags indicate national team as defined under FIFA eligibility rules; some limited exceptions apply. Players may hold more than one non-FIFA nationality.

| No. | Pos. | Nation | Player |
|---|---|---|---|
| 1 | GK | BEL | Kenny Steppe |
| 3 | DF | DEN | Kristian Bach Bak |
| 4 | DF | NED | Michel Breuer |
| 5 | DF | NED | Michael Dingsdag |
| 6 | DF | SRB | Igor Đurić |
| 7 | MF | SWE | Viktor Elm |
| 8 | FW | NED | Roy Beerens |
| 9 | MF | NED | Geert Arend Roorda |
| 10 | MF | FIN | Mika Väyrynen |
| 11 | FW | CZE | Michal Papadopulos |
| 14 | MF | SRB | Filip Đuričić |
| 15 | MF | CZE | Michal Švec |
| 17 | MF | NOR | Christian Grindheim |
| 18 | MF | SWE | Philip Haglund |
| 19 | DF | NED | Daryl Janmaat |
| 20 | DF | MKD | Goran Popov |
| 22 | MF | MAR | Oussama Assaidi |
| 23 | MF | ARG | Hernán Losada (loaned from Anderlecht) |

| No. | Pos. | Nation | Player |
|---|---|---|---|
| 24 | GK | CZE | Martin Lejsal (loaned from Brno) |
| 25 | GK | BEL | Brian Vandenbussche |
| 26 | GK | NED | Henk Timmer |
| 27 | GK | NED | Diederik Bangma |
| 28 | GK | IRI | Agil Etemadi |
| 29 | MF | ISL | Björn Jónsson |
| 30 | DF | NED | Bart de Groot |
| 31 | MF | ISL | Arnór Smárason |
| 32 | MF | NED | Richard Stolte |
| 33 | DF | NED | Johnny de Vries |
| 35 | FW | NED | Gerald Sibon |
| 37 | DF | NED | Gerry Koning |
| 38 | DF | NED | Jeffrey Gouweleeuw |
| 39 | FW | MKD | Samir Fazli |
| 40 | DF | NED | Rico Wolven |
| 43 | MF | NED | Luciano Narsingh |
| 44 | MF | POL | Paweł Wojciechowski |
| 45 | MF | NED | Pele van Anholt |

== Competitions ==
=== Overview ===
| Competition | First match | Last match | Starting round | Final position | Record | | | | | | | |
| Competition | First match | Last match | Starting round | Final position | Pld | W | D | L | GF | GA | GD | Win % |
|---|---|---|---|---|---|---|---|---|---|---|---|---|
| Eredivisie | 31 July 2009 | 2 May 2010 | Matchday 1 | 11th | 34 | 11 | 4 | 19 | 44 | 64 | −20 | 32.35 |
| KNVB Cup | 23 September 2009 | 16 January 2010 | Second round | Fourth round | 3 | 2 | 0 | 1 | 12 | 5 | +7 | 66.67 |
| Johan Cruyff Shield | 25 July 2009 | | Final | Runners-up | 1 | 0 | 0 | 1 | 1 | 5 | −4 | 0.00 |
| UEFA Europa League | 20 August 2009 | 16 December 2009 | Play-off round | Group stage | 8 | 2 | 4 | 2 | 12 | 8 | +4 | 25.00 |
| Total | | | | | 46 | 15 | 8 | 23 | 69 | 82 | −13 | 32.61 |

Source: Competitions

=== Johan Cruyff Shield ===
Heerenveen, as KNVB Cup winners in the previous season, played against AZ in the 2009 Johan Cruyff Shield, who themselves won the Eredivisie.

| 25 July 2009 Final | AZ | 5–1 | Heerenveen | Amsterdam |
| 20:00 CEST (UTC+2) | Holman 15'; El Hamdaoui 25'; Martens 28'; Lens 67', 87' | Report | Breuer (yellow card) 10'; Papadopulos 60' | Stadium: Amsterdam Arena; Referee: Björn Kuipers; Assistant referees: Patrick Gerritsen, Sander van Roekel; Fourth official: Michel Winter |

=== Eredivisie ===
==== League table ====
| Pos | Team | Pld | W | D | L | GF | GA | GD | Pts | Qualification or relegation |
|---|---|---|---|---|---|---|---|---|---|---|
| 9 | Roda JC | 34 | 14 | 5 | 15 | 56 | 60 | −4 | 47 | Qualification to European competition play-offs |
| 10 | NAC Breda | 34 | 12 | 10 | 12 | 42 | 49 | −7 | 46 | |
| 11 | Heerenveen | 34 | 11 | 4 | 19 | 44 | 64 | −20 | 37 | |
| 12 | VVV-Venlo | 34 | 8 | 11 | 15 | 43 | 57 | −14 | 35 | |
| 13 | NEC | 34 | 8 | 9 | 17 | 35 | 59 | −24 | 33 | |

Source: eredivsie.nl (in Dutch)
Rules for classification: 1) points; 2) goal difference; 3) number of goals scored.

==== Results summary ====
| Overall | | | | | | | | Home | | | | | | Away | | | | | |
| Pld | W | D | L | GF | GA | GD | Pts | W | D | L | GF | GA | GD | W | D | L | GF | GA | GD |
|---|---|---|---|---|---|---|---|---|---|---|---|---|---|---|---|---|---|---|---|
| 34 | 11 | 4 | 19 | 44 | 64 | −20 | 37 | 7 | 4 | 6 | 25 | 19 | +6 | 4 | 0 | 13 | 19 | 45 | −26 |

Source: Soccerway

==== Matches ====
| 31 July 2009 1 | Heerenveen | 0–0 | Roda JC | Heerenveen |
| 20:47 CEST (UTC+2) | Paulo Henrique (yellow card) 90+2' | Report | De Jong (yellow card) 79' | Stadium: Abe Lenstra Stadion; Referee: Richard Liesveld; Assistant referees: Jac Schenkels, Erwin Zeinstra; Fourth official: Mario Diks |

| 7 August 2009 2 | NEC | 4–1 | Heerenveen | Nijmegen |
| 18:01 CEST (UTC+2) | Vleminckx 6', 82'; Babos (yellow card) 29'; Fejzullahu 56'; El Akchaoui 65' | Report | Breuer (yellow card) 3'; Stolte (yellow card) 39'; Popov (yellow card) 75'; Papadopulos 85' | Stadium: Goffertstadion; Referee: Pol van Boekel; Assistant referees: Angelo Boonman, Dave Goossens; Fourth official: Kristian Bakkelo |

| 15 August 2009 3 | Heerenveen | 1–0 | Vitesse Arnhem | Heerenveen |
| 20:45 CEST (UTC+2) | Losada 13', (yellow card) 42'; Kalou (yellow card) 89' | Report | Jong-a-Pin (yellow card) 28' | Stadium: Abe Lenstra Stadion; Referee: Roelof Luinge; Assistant referees: Jantinus Meints, Wilfred van der Pas; Fourth official: Jochem Kamphuis |

| 23 August 2009 4 | Heerenveen | 0–2 | AZ | Heerenveen |
| 14:30 CEST (UTC+2) | | Report | Lejsal 30' (o.g.); El Hamdaoui 64' | Stadium: Abe Lenstra Stadion; Referee: Ruud Bossen; Assistant referees: Berry Simons, Sander van Roekel; Fourth official: Michel Winter |

| 30 August 2009 5 | NAC Breda | 2–0 | Heerenveen | Breda |
| 14:30 CEST (UTC+2) | De Graaf (yellow card) 34'; Kwakman 51'; Amoah 58'; Gorter (yellow card) 86' | Report | Papadopulos (yellow card) 39'; Kalou (yellow card) 45' | Stadium: Rat Verlegh Stadion; Referee: Eric Braamhaar; Assistant referees: Patrick Gerritsen, Nicky Siebert; Fourth official: Maarten Ketting |

| 12 September 2009 6 | Heerenveen | 0–1 | Groningen | Heerenveen |
| 19:45 CEST (UTC+2) | Bak (yellow card) 30'; Dingsdag (yellow card) 74' (yellow-red card) 90' | Report | Zonneveld (yellow card) 43'; Nordstrand 61'; Lovre (yellow card) 90' | Stadium: Abe Lenstra Stadion; Referee: Björn Kuipers; Assistant referees: Berry Simons, Sander van Roekel; Fourth official: Mario Diks |

| 20 September 2009 7 | Heerenveen | 0–2 | Twente | Heerenveen |
| 14:30 CEST (UTC+2) | Breuer (yellow card) 39'; Losada (yellow card) 55'; Popov (yellow card) 76' | Report | Stoch 22', 72'; Perez (yellow card) 29'; Brama (yellow card) 51'; Nkufo (yellow card) 61' | Stadium: Abe Lenstra Stadion; Referee: Pieter Vink; Assistant referees: Angelo Boonman, Hans ten Hoove; Fourth official: Michel Winter |

| 30 September 2009 8 | Sparta Rotterdam | 0–2 | Heerenveen | Rotterdam |
| 14:31 CEST (UTC+2) | Adeleye (yellow card) 17'; Rutjes (yellow card) 73' | Report | Elm (yellow card) 14', (goal) 73' (pen.); Dingsdag (yellow card) 28'; Paulo Henrique 45'; Janmaat (yellow card) 71' | Stadium: Sparta Stadion Het Kasteel; Referee: Pol van Boekel; Assistant referees: Angelo Boonman, Charles Schaap; Fourth official: Jochem Kamphuis |

| 4 October 2009 9 | Heerenveen | 1–1 | VVV-Venlo | Heerenveen |
| 14:30 CEST (UTC+2) | Grindheim (yellow card) 78'; Papadopulos 90+3' | Report | Calabro 88', (yellow card) 89' | Stadium: Abe Lenstra Stadion; Referee: Raymond van Meenen; Assistant referees: Frank Jansen, Rob van de Ven; Fourth official: Kristian Bakkelo |

| 17 October 2009 10 | PSV | 1–0 | Heerenveen | Eindhoven |
| 20:45 CEST (UTC+2) | Lazović 81' | Report | Popov (yellow card) 24'; Grindheim (yellow card) 33'; Švec (yellow card) 50'; Breuer (yellow card) 61' | Stadium: Philips Stadion; Referee: Jack van Hulten; Assistant referees: Adriaan Inia, Erwin Zeinstra; Fourth official: Michel Winter |

| 25 October 2009 11 | Willem II | 4–1 | Heerenveen | Tilburg |
| 14:30 CET (UTC+1) | Zijler (yellow card) 13', (goal) 48'; Boutahar 51'; Demouge 70', 90+3' | Report | Švec (yellow card) 36'; Papadopulos 65' | Stadium: Koning Willem II Stadion; Referee: Bas Nijhuis; Assistant referees: Coen Droste, Wilco Lobbert; Fourth official: Maarten Ketting |

| 31 October 2009 12 | Heerenveen | 3–0 | ADO Den Haag | Heerenveen |
| 18:45 CET (UTC+1) | Beerens 21'; Breuer (yellow card) 53'; Papadopulos 63', 77' | Report | Bosschaart (yellow card) 14' (yellow-red card) 43'; Schwiebbe (yellow card) 58'; Ditewig (yellow card) 77' | Stadium: Abe Lenstra Stadion; Referee: Eric Braamhaar; Assistant referees: Dave Goossens, Charles John Schaap; Fourth official: Mario Diks |

| 8 November 2009 13 | Utrecht | 2–3 | Heerenveen | Utrecht |
| 14:30 CET (UTC+1) | Van Dijk (yellow card) 45'; Cornelisse 81'; Mulenga 90' | Report | Elm 15'; Popov (yellow card) 16'; Janmaat (yellow card) 33'; Papadopulos 68', 78' | Stadium: Stadion Galgenwaard; Referee: Pol van Boekel; Assistant referees: Angelo Boonman, Rob van de Ven; Fourth official: Maarten Ketting |

| 22 November 2009 14 | Ajax | 5–1 | Heerenveen | Amsterdam |
| 14:30 CET (UTC+1) | De Zeeuw 7', 24'; Pantelić 28'; Suárez 35' (pen.); Aissati 40' | Report | Assaidi (yellow card) 34'; Popov 39'; Breuer (yellow card) 79' | Stadium: Amsterdam Arena; Referee: Roelof Luinge; Assistant referees: Patrick Gerritsen, Adriaan Inia; Fourth official: Ed Janssen |

| 28 November 2009 15 | Heerenveen | 3–1 | RKC Waalwijk | Heerenveen |
| 19:45 CET (UTC+1) | Assaidi (yellow card) 23'; Elm 39', 54', (penalty missed) 58'; Papadopulos (yellow card) 42'; Väyrynen (yellow card) 90'; Beerens 90+2' | Report | Mulder (yellow card) 57'; Benson (yellow card) 79' | Stadium: Abe Lenstra Stadion; Referee: Kevin Blom; Assistant referees: Angelo Boonman, Roger Geutjes; Fourth official: Karel van den Heuvel |

| 6 December 2009 16 | Heracles | 3–1 | Heerenveen | Almelo |
| 16:28 CET (UTC+1) | Looms 16'; Overtoom 26' (pen.); Steur (yellow card) 88'; Dost 90' | Report | Papadopulos (yellow card) 48'; Assaidi 82' | Stadium: Polman Stadion; Referee: Ed Janssen; Assistant referees: Hans Olde Olthof, Jac Schenkels; Fourth official: Jeroen Sanders |

| 12 December 2009 17 | Heerenveen | 0–2 | Feyenoord | Heerenveen |
| 19:45 CET (UTC+1) | | Report | Hofland 68'; Tomasson 82' | Stadium: Abe Lenstra Stadion; Referee: Ruud Bossen; Assistant referees: Wilco Lobbert, Nicky Siebert; Fourth official: Jeroen Sanders |

| 20 January 2010 18 | Groningen | 2–0 | Heerenveen | Groningen |
| 20:00 CET (UTC+1) | Matavž 13', (yellow card) 82'; Granqvist 60' | Report | Breuer (yellow card) 60' | Stadium: Euroborg; Referee: Pieter Vink; Assistant referees: Hans ten Hoove, Rob van de Ven; Fourth official: Rutger Bekebrede |

| 23 January 2010 19 | Heerenveen | 4–2 | Willem II | Heerenveen |
| 19:45 CET (UTC+1) | Švec (yellow card) 44'; Breuer 56'; Paulo Henrique 78', 89'; Losada 79', (yellow card) 79' | Report | Zijler (yellow card) 36'; Demouge 47'; Bruma (yellow card) 53'; Nijland 72', (yellow card) 90'; Pereira (red card) 83' | Stadium: Abe Lenstra Stadion; Referee: Eric Braamhaar; Assistant referees: Patrick Gerritsen, Wilco Lobbert; Fourth official: Michel Winter |

| 30 January 2010 20 | ADO Den Haag | 2–1 | Heerenveen | The Hague |
| 20:45 CET (UTC+1) | Van Hese (yellow card) 51'; Verhoek 78'; Milić 80', (yellow card) 90+3' | Report | Sibon 30'; Janmaat (yellow card) 33' (yellow-red card) 45'; Breuer (yellow card) 59'; Popov (yellow card) 80'; Vandenbussche (yellow card) 90+3' | Stadium: ADO Den Haag Stadion; Referee: Kevin Blom; Assistant referees: Ruud Bexkens, Erwin Zeinstra; Fourth official: Lorenzo Cairo |

| 2 February 2010 21 | VVV-Venlo | 3–1 | Heerenveen | Venlo |
| 20:00 CET (UTC+1) | De Regt 11'; Gonzalo García 14'; Calabro 16'; Paauwe (yellow card) 34'; Schaken (yellow card) 89' | Report | Grindheim (yellow card) 4'; Sibon 35' (pen.); Papadopulos (yellow card) 73' | Stadium: De Koel; Referee: Roelof Luinge; Assistant referees: Jac Schenkels, Jurgen Schiphorst; Fourth official: Jordy de Goeij |

| 6 February 2010 22 | Heerenveen | 2–0 | Utrecht | Heerenveen |
| 19:45 CET (UTC+1) | Sibon 5', 51' (pen.); Paulo Henrique (yellow card) 40' | Report | Asare (yellow card) 2'; Vorm (yellow card) 50' | Stadium: Abe Lenstra Stadion; Referee: Ed Janssen; Assistant referees: Mark Strijker, Bas van Dongen; Fourth official: Edwin van de Graaf |

| 13 February 2010 23 | Heerenveen | 0–2 | Ajax | Heerenveen |
| 19:45 CET (UTC+1) | Janmaat (yellow card) 51'; Grindheim (red card) 73' | Report | Van der Wiel (yellow card) 25'; Pantelić (yellow card) 45'; Rommedahl 48'; Suárez 90' | Stadium: Abe Lenstra Stadion; Referee: Ruud Bossen; Assistant referees: Angelo Boonman, Erwin Zeinstra; Fourth official: Stefan Tulleners |

| 20 February 2010 24 | RKC Waalwijk | 1–2 | Heerenveen | Waalwijk |
| 19:45 CET (UTC+1) | De Ceulaer (yellow card) 17', (goal) 68'; Di Gregorio (yellow card) 17'; Boerrigter (yellow card) 62'; Colin (yellow card) 84' | Report | Sibon 13', 84' (pen.) | Stadium: Mandemakers Stadion; Referee: Bas Nijhuis; Assistant referees: Angelo Boonman, Erwin Zeinstra; Fourth official: Edwin van de Graaf |

| 27 February 2010 25 | Heerenveen | 1–2 | Heracles | Heerenveen |
| 18:45 CET (UTC+1) | Sibon 64'; Väyrynen (yellow card) 66' | Report | Dost 50'; Everton 75'; Van der Linden (yellow card) 90' | Stadium: Abe Lenstra Stadion; Referee: Richard Liesveld; Assistant referees: Dave Goossens, Peter Janson; Fourth official: Michel Winter |

| 6 March 2010 26 | AZ | 4–1 | Heerenveen | Alkmaar |
| 18:45 CET (UTC+1) | Martens 22'; Schaars (yellow card) 25'; El Hamdaoui 35'; Lens 68'; Holman 90' | Report | Đuričić 20', (yellow card) 21' | Stadium: DSB Stadion; Referee: Pieter Vink; Assistant referees: Arie Brink, Hans ten Hoove; Fourth official: Bart van der Scheer |

| 14 March 2010 27 | Vitesse Arnhem | 0–1 | Heerenveen | Arnhem |
| 14:30 CET (UTC+1) | Nilsson (yellow card) 89' | Report | Beerens 83' | Stadium: GelreDome; Referee: Danny Makkelie; Assistant referees: Jaap Pool, Wijnand Rutgers; Fourth official: Martin van den Kerkhof |

| 19 March 2010 28 | Heerenveen | 4–1 | NEC | Heerenveen |
| 20:45 CET (UTC+1) | Sibon 31' (pen.), 50'; Beerens (yellow card) 54'; Breuer 90+2' (pen.); Fazli 90+4' | Report | Goossens 12'; Zomer (yellow card) 30'; Pothuizen (yellow card) 69'; Sarpong (red card) 90+1' | Stadium: Abe Lenstra Stadion; Referee: Roelof Luinge; Assistant referees: Jantinus Meints, Jac Schenkels; Fourth official: Dennis Higler |

| 27 March 2010 29 | Roda JC | 4–2 | Heerenveen | Kerkrade |
| 19:45 CET (UTC+1) | Junker 7', 33'; De Jong 13'; De fauw (penalty missed) 32'; Bodor 37'; Djoum (yellow card) 72' | Report | Assaidi (red card) 9'; Timmer (yellow card) 31'; Väyrynen (yellow card) 32', (goal) 88'; Breuer 73' (pen.) | Stadium: Parkstad Limburg Stadion; Referee: Kevin Blom; Assistant referees: Nicky Siebert, Bas van Dongen; Fourth official: Stefan Tulleners |

| 3 April 2010 30 | Heerenveen | 4–1 | Sparta Rotterdam | Heerenveen |
| 20:45 CEST (UTC+2) | Losada 9', 77'; Dingsdag (red card) 17'; Sibon 39' (pen.); Beerens 43' | Report | John (penalty missed) 18'; Van Gessel (yellow card) 27'; Adeleye (yellow card) 38'; Falkenburg 60' | Stadium: Abe Lenstra Stadion; Referee: Bas Nijhuis; Assistant referees: Ruud Bexkens, Wilco Lobbert; Fourth official: Jeroen Sanders |

| 10 April 2010 31 | Twente | 2–0 | Heerenveen | Enschede |
| 18:45 CEST (UTC+2) | Tioté 70'; De Jong 90+1' | Report | | Stadium: De Grolsch Veste; Referee: Jan Wegereef; Assistant referees: Rob van de Ven, Erwin Zeinstra; Fourth official: Maarten Ketting |

| 14 April 2010 32 | Heerenveen | 2–2 | PSV | Heerenveen |
| 20:00 CEST (UTC+2) | Švec (yellow card) 14'; Sibon 51'; Wojciechowski 66' | Report | Salcido (yellow card) 45'; Dzsudzsák 49'; Manolev 62' | Stadium: Abe Lenstra Stadion; Referee: Jack van Hulten; Assistant referees: Angelo Boonman, Jac Schenkels; Fourth official: Kristian Bakkelo |

| 18 April 2010 33 | Heerenveen | 0–0 | NAC Breda | Heerenveen |
| 14:30 CEST (UTC+2) | Sibon (penalty missed) 76'; Fazli (yellow card) 81'; Smárason (yellow card) 90+3' | Report | Penders (yellow card) 45+1'; Ten Rouwelaar (yellow card) 45+1'; Schilder (red card) 74'; Lurling (yellow card) 75' | Stadium: Abe Lenstra Stadion; Referee: Björn Kuipers; Assistant referees: Berry Simons, Sander van Roekel; Fourth official: Bart van der Scheer |

| 2 May 2010 34 | Feyenoord | 6–2 | Heerenveen | Rotterdam |
| 14:30 CEST (UTC+2) | Makaay 13', 58', 75'; De Vrij 32'; Tomasson 51'; Bahia 86' | Report | Grindheim 12'; Roorda (yellow card) 14'; Elm 23' | Stadium: De Kuip; Referee: Danny Makkelie; Assistant referees: Adriaan Inia, Wim van der Zanden; Fourth official: Bart van der Scheer |

=== KNVB Cup ===
| 23 September 2009 Second round | SDC Putten | 0–7 | Heerenveen | Putten |
| 17:00 CEST (UTC+2) | | Report | Losada 6'; Papadopulos 26', 49', 84'; Assaidi 55'; Elm 56', 74' | Stadium: Sportpark Puttereng |

| 28 October 2009 Third round | Heerenveen | 4–2 | RBC Roosendaal | Heerenveen |
| 20:00 CET (UTC+1) | Janmaat 13'; Popov 59'; Papadopulos 72'; Breuer 90' (pen.); Assaidi (yellow card) | Report | Ars 65', 85'; Boddaert (yellow card); Gündoğan (yellow card); Hayen (yellow card); Pollemans (yellow card) | Stadium: Abe Lenstra Stadion; Referee: Michel Winter; Assistant referees: Jermaine Lapar, Jantinus Meints; Fourth official: Jochem Kamphuis |

| 16 January 2010 Fourth round | Heerenveen | 1–3 | PSV | Heerenveen |
| 19:45 CET (UTC+1) | Grindheim (yellow card) 27'; Sibon 79' | Report | Dzsudzsák 25', (yellow card) 33'; Bakkal (yellow card) 63'; Lazović 64'; Amrabat 90+2' | Stadium: Abe Lenstra Stadion; Referee: Bas Nijhuis; Assistant referees: Coen Droste, Richard Slot; Fourth official: Michel Winter |

=== UEFA Europa League ===
==== Play-off round ====
| 20 August 2009 First leg | PAOK (Greece) | 1–1 | (Netherlands) Heerenveen | Thessaloniki, Greece |
| 20:00 EEST (UTC+3) | Vieirinha (yellow card) 52'; Ivić 54'; Malezas (yellow card) 61'; Vitolo (yellow card) 62' | Report | Paulo Henrique 45', (yellow card) 50'; Koning (yellow card) 56' | Stadium: Toumba Stadium; Attendance: 22,403; Referee: Willie Collum (Scotland); Assistant referees: Francis Andrews (Scotland), Keith Sorbie (Scotland); Fourth official: Bobby Madden (Scotland) |

| 27 August 2009 Second leg | Heerenveen (Netherlands) | 0–0 ((a) 1–1 agg.) | (Greece) PAOK | Heerenveen, Netherlands |
| 18:45 CEST (UTC+2) | Breuer (yellow card) 25'; Dingsdag (yellow card) 56'; Losada (yellow card) 61'; Đurić (not on pitch) (yellow card) 89'; Bak (yellow card) 90+5' | Report | Vitolo (yellow card) 69'; Bizera (yellow card) 86'; Cirillo (yellow card) 90+5' | Stadium: Abe Lenstra Stadion; Attendance: 15,000; Referee: Eduardo Iturralde González (Spain); Assistant referees: Roberto del Palomar (Spain), Jon Núñez (Spain); Fourth official: Javier Turienzo Alvarez (Spain) |
Note: 1–1 on aggregate. Heerenveen won on away goals.

==== Group stage ====
| Pos | Team | Pld | W | D | L | GF | GA | GD | Pts | Qualification | SCP | HER | HVN | VEN |
|---|---|---|---|---|---|---|---|---|---|---|---|---|---|---|
| 1 | (Portugal) Sporting CP | 6 | 3 | 2 | 1 | 8 | 6 | +2 | 11 | Advance to knockout phase | — | 1–0 | 1–1 | 1–1 |
| 2 | (Germany) Hertha BSC | 6 | 3 | 1 | 2 | 6 | 5 | +1 | 10 | Advance to knockout phase | 1–0 | — | 0–1 | 1–1 |
| 3 | (Netherlands) Heerenveen | 6 | 2 | 2 | 2 | 11 | 7 | +4 | 8 | | 2–3 | 2–3 | — | 5–0 |
| 4 | (Latvia) Ventspils | 6 | 0 | 3 | 3 | 3 | 10 | −7 | 3 | | 1–2 | 0–1 | 0–0 | — |

Source: Soccerway

| 17 September 2009 1 | Heerenveen (Netherlands) | 2–3 | (Portugal) Sporting CP | Heerenveen, Netherlands |
| 19:00 CEST (UTC+2) | Sibon 12'; Dingsdag 77'; Assaidi (yellow card) 79' | Report | Liédson 17', 40', 88'; Veloso (yellow card) 66' | Stadium: Abe Lenstra Stadion; Attendance: 13,000; Referee: Aleksei Nikolaev (Russia); Assistant referees: Tikhon Kalugin (Russia), Oleg Tselovalnikov (Russia); Fourth official: Stanislav Sukhina (Russia); Goal-line assistants: Sergei Karasev (Russia), Maksim Layushkin (Russia) |

| 1 October 2009 2 | Ventspils (Latvia) | 0–0 | (Netherlands) Heerenveen | Riga, Latvia (Note: The match was played at the Skonto Stadium in Riga, instead of Ventspils regular stadium, the Ventspils Olimpiskais Stadions in Ventspils, which did not meet UEFA requirements.) |
| 22:05 EEST (UTC+3) | | Report | Dingsdag (yellow card) 90+3' | Stadium: Skonto Stadium; Attendance: 3,500; Referee: Oleh Oriekhov (Ukraine); Assistant referees: Oleg Pluzhnyk (Ukraine), Oleksandr Voytyuk (Ukraine); Fourth official: Yuriy Moseychuk (Ukraine); Goal-line assistants: Andriy Shandor (Ukraine), Viktor Shvetsov (Ukraine) |

| 22 October 2009 3 | Hertha BSC (Germany) | 0–1 | (Netherlands) Heerenveen | Berlin, Germany |
| 21:05 CEST (UTC+2) | Friedrich (yellow card) 62'; Lustenberger (yellow card) 71'; Ebert (yellow card) 78' (yellow-red card) 90+4' | Report | Losada 36'; Bak (yellow card) 55'; Assaidi (yellow card) 65'; Janmaat (red card) 76' | Stadium: Olympiastadion; Attendance: 13,134; Referee: Costas Kapitanis (Cyprus); Assistant referees: Michael Soteriou (Cyprus), Andreas Xanthou (Cyprus); Fourth official: Demetris Chrysostomou (Cyprus); Goal-line assistants: Panayiotis Kailis (Cyprus), Leontios Trattou (Cyprus) |

| 5 November 2009 4 | Heerenveen (Netherlands) | 2–3 | (Germany) Hertha BSC | Heerenveen, Netherlands |
| 19:00 CET (UTC+1) | Papadopulos 4', 36' | Report | Domovchiyski 21', 52'; Friedrich (yellow card) 45'; Wichniarek 90+1' | Stadium: Abe Lenstra Stadion; Attendance: 20,000; Referee: Cristian Balaj (Romania); Assistant referees: Zoltán Székely (Romania), George Adrian Vidan (Romania); Fourth official: Teodor Crăciunescu (Romania); Goal-line assistants: Ovidiu Hațegan (Romania), István Kovács (Romania) |

| 3 December 2009 5 | Sporting CP (Portugal) | 1–1 | (Netherlands) Heerenveen | Lisbon, Portugal |
| 20:05 WET (UTC) | Liédson (yellow card) 52'; Grimi 90+1' | Report | Assaidi 47'; Popov (yellow card) 67'; Elm (yellow card) 78' | Stadium: Estádio José Alvalade; Attendance: 12,264; Referee: Pavel Královec (Czech Republic); Assistant referees: Martin Wilczek (Czech Republic), Miroslav Zlámal (Czech Republic); Fourth official: Tomáš Kocourek (Czech Republic); Goal-line assistants: Libor Kovařík (Czech Republic), Michal Paták (Czech Republic) |

| 16 December 2009 6 | Heerenveen (Netherlands) | 5–0 | (Latvia) Ventspils | Heerenveen, Netherlands |
| 19:00 CET (UTC+1) | Papadopulos (yellow card) 41'; Väyrynen 55'; Elm 58'; Sibon 77', 78'; Janmaat 88' | Report | Rugins (yellow card) 30'; Chirkin (yellow card) 40' | Stadium: Abe Lenstra Stadion; Attendance: 16,000; Referee: Robert Schörgenhofer (Austria); Assistant referees: Alain Hoxha (Austria), Mario Strudl (Austria); Fourth official: Gerhard Grobelnik (Austria); Goal-line assistants: Thomas Gangl (Austria), Stefan Messner (Austria) |
