= 2009–10 AZ Alkmaar season =

AZ
2009–10 season
- Manager: Ronald Koeman (until 5 December); Martin Haar (caretaker, from 5 December to 10 December); Dick Advocaat (from 10 December)
- Stadium: DSB Stadion
- Eredivisie: 5th
- KNVB Cup: Fourth round
- Johan Cruyff Shield: Winners
- UEFA Champions League: Group stage
- Top goalscorer: League: Mounir El Hamdaoui (20); All: Mounir El Hamdaoui (23)
Home colours

The 2009–10 season was Alkmaar Zaanstreek's 43rd competitive season, 12th consecutive season in the Eredivisie and 43rd year in existence as a football club. In addition to the domestic league, AZ participated in this season's editions of the KNVB Cup, Johan Cruyff Shield and UEFA Champions League.

== Squad ==
Note: Flags indicate national team as defined under FIFA eligibility rules; some limited exceptions apply. Players may hold more than one non-FIFA nationality.

No.	Pos.	Nation	Player
1	GK	CRO	Joey Didulica
2	DF	NED	Kew Jaliens
4	DF	MEX	Héctor Moreno
6	DF	NED	David Mendes da Silva
7	FW	NED	Jeremain Lens
8	MF	NED	Stijn Schaars
10	FW	MAR	Mounir El Hamdaoui
11	MF	BEL	Maarten Martens
14	DF	EST	Ragnar Klavan
15	MF	DEN	Simon Poulsen
16	MF	SWE	Pontus Wernbloom

No.	Pos.	Nation	Player
18	FW	BEL	Mousa Dembélé
20	MF	SWE	Rasmus Elm
21	GK	NED	Erik Heijblok
22	GK	ARG	Sergio Romero
23	MF	NED	Nick van der Velden
24	MF	AUS	James Holland
25	DF	FIN	Niklas Moisander
26	MF	PAR	Celso Ortiz
27	MF	AUS	Brett Holman
28	DF	BEL	Gill Swerts
29	FW	ITA	Graziano Pellè

== Competitions ==
=== Overview ===
Competition	First match	Last match	Starting round	Final position	Record							
Competition	First match	Last match	Starting round	Final position	Pld	W	D	L	GF	GA	GD	Win %
Eredivisie	1 August 2009	2 May 2010	Matchday 1	5th	34	19	5	10	64	34	+30	55.88
KNVB Cup	22 September 2009	22 December 2009	Second round	Fourth Round	3	2	0	1	7	3	+4	66.67
Johan Cruyff Shield	25 July 2009		Final	Winners	1	1	0	0	5	1	+4	100.00
UEFA Champions League	16 September 2009	9 December 2009	Group stage	Group stage	6	0	4	2	4	8	−4	0.00
Total					44	22	9	13	80	46	+34	50.00

Source: Competitions

=== Johan Cruyff Shield ===
AZ, as Eredivisie winners in the previous season, played against Heerenveen in the 2009 Johan Cruyff Shield, who themselves won the KNVB Cup.

25 July 2009 Final	AZ	5–1	Heerenveen	Amsterdam
20:00 CEST (UTC+2)	Holman 15'; El Hamdaoui 25'; Martens 28'; Lens 67', 87'	Report	Breuer (yellow card) 10'; Papadopulos 60'	Stadium: Amsterdam Arena; Referee: Björn Kuipers

=== Eredivisie ===
==== League table ====
Pos	Team	Pld	W	D	L	GF	GA	GD	Pts	Qualification or relegation
3	PSV	34	23	9	2	72	29	+43	78	Qualification to Europa League play-off round
4	Feyenoord	34	17	12	5	54	31	+23	63	Qualification to Europa League play-off round
5	AZ	34	19	5	10	64	34	+30	62	Qualification to Europa League third qualifying round
6	Heracles	34	17	5	12	54	49	+5	56	Qualification to European competition play-offs
7	Utrecht (O)	34	14	11	9	39	33	+6	53	Qualification to European competition play-offs

Source: eredivsie.nl (in Dutch)
Rules for classification: 1) points; 2) goal difference; 3) number of goals scored.
(O) Play-off winners

==== Results summary ====
Overall								Home						Away					
Pld	W	D	L	GF	GA	GD	Pts	W	D	L	GF	GA	GD	W	D	L	GF	GA	GD
34	19	5	10	64	34	+30	62	11	2	4	33	16	+17	8	3	6	31	18	+13

Source: Competitions

==== Matches ====
1 August 2009 1	Heracles	3–2	AZ	Almelo
19:45 CEST (UTC+2)	Everton 7'; Overtoom 48'; Fledderus 62'	Report	Pellè 77'; El Hamdaoui 77'	Stadium: Polman Stadion; Referee: Reinold Wiedemeijer

7 August 2009 2	AZ	2–0	Sparta Rotterdam	Alkmaar
20:50 CEST (UTC+2)	Dembélé 6'; El Hamdaoui 64'	Report		Stadium: DSB Stadion; Referee: Eric Braamhaar

15 August 2009 3	RKC Waalwijk	0–6	AZ	Waalwijk
19:45 CEST (UTC+2)		Report	El Hamdaoui 15', 67'; Dembélé 52'; Martens 75', 79'; Lens 82'	Stadium: Mandemakers Stadion; Referee: Richard Liesveld

23 August 2009 4	Heerenveen	0–2	AZ	Heerenveen
14:30 CEST (UTC+2)		Report	Lejsal 30' (o.g.); El Hamdaoui 64'	Stadium: Abe Lenstra Stadion; Referee: Ruud Bossen

29 August 2009 5	AZ	2–1	Willem II	Alkmaar
19:45 CEST (UTC+2)	Holman 7'; Moreno 24'	Report	Zijler 23'	Stadium: DSB Stadion; Referee: Kevin Blom

12 September 2009 6	ADO Den Haag	2–1	AZ	The Hague
20:50 CEST (UTC+2)	Verhoek 4'; Immers 54'	Report	Lens 86'	Stadium: ADO Den Haag Stadion; Referee: Roelof Luinge

19 September 2009 7	AZ	0–1	NEC	Alkmaar
20:47 CEST (UTC+2)		Report	Davids 87'	Stadium: DSB Stadion; Referee: Björn Kuipers

26 September 2009 8	Utrecht	1–0	AZ	Utrecht
18:48 CEST (UTC+2)	Keller 14'	Report		Stadium: Stadion Galgenwaard; Referee: Eric Braamhaar

3 October 2009 9	AZ	1–0	NAC Breda	Alkmaar
19:45 CEST (UTC+2)	Lens 30'	Report		Stadium: DSB Stadion; Referee: Richard Liesveld

17 October 2009 10	Twente	3–2	AZ	Enschede
19:45 CEST (UTC+2)	Perez 36'; Ruiz 61'; Nkufo 90'	Report	El Hamdaoui 57'; Wisgerhof 60' (o.g.)	Stadium: De Grolsch Veste; Referee: Pieter Vink

25 October 2009 11	AZ	2–4	Ajax	Alkmaar
14:30 CET (UTC+1)	El Hamdaoui 28'; Pellè 90+2'	Report	Emanuelson 57'; Suárez 58', 90+1'; Van der Wiel 65'	Stadium: DSB Stadion; Referee: Danny Makkelie

31 October 2009 12	Groningen	0–1	AZ	Groningen
20:45 CET (UTC+1)		Report	Lens 85'	Stadium: Euroborg; Referee: Tom van Sichem

8 November 2009 13	AZ	1–1	Feyenoord	Alkmaar
14:30 CET (UTC+1)	Holmann 55'	Report	Cissé 5'	Stadium: DSB Stadion; Referee: Björn Kuipers

21 November 2009 14	Roda JC	2–4	AZ	Kerkrade
18:45 CET (UTC+1)	Kah 27'; Yulu-Matondo 53'; Junker (yellow card) 54'	Report	Lens 3', 75'; Elm 70'; Jonathas 80', (yellow card) 83', (red card) 90+1'	Stadium: Parkstad Limburg Stadion; Referee: Kevin Blom

28 November 2009 15	AZ	2–0	VVV-Venlo	Alkmaar
18:45 CET (UTC+1)	Lens 21'; Holman 47'	Report		Stadium: DSB Stadion; Referee: Danny Makkelie

4 December 2009 16	AZ	1–2	Vitesse Arnhem	Alkmaar
20:45 CET (UTC+1)	Dembélé 9', (red card) 79'	Report	Molhoek (yellow card) 48'; Nilsson 50'; Stevanović 59', (red card) 79'	Stadium: DSB Stadion; Referee: Roelof Luinge

12 December 2009 17	PSV	1–0	AZ	Eindhoven
20:45 CET (UTC+1)	Toivonen 86'	Report		Stadium: Philips Stadion; Referee: Pieter Vink

19 December 2009 18	AZ	3–0	ADO Den Haag	Alkmaar
18:45 CET (UTC+1)	Elm 10'; Pocognoli 30'; Martens 88'	Report		Stadium: DSB Stadion; Referee: Reinold Wiedemeijer

24 January 2010 19	Ajax	1–0	AZ	Amsterdam
12:30 CET (UTC+1)	Van der Wiel 63'	Report		Stadium: Amsterdam Arena; Referee: Björn Kuipers

30 January 2010 20	AZ	0–1	Groningen	Alkmaar
19:45 CET (UTC+1)		Report	Matavž 55'	Stadium: DSB Stadion; Referee: Bas Nijhuis

2 February 2010 21	NAC Breda	1–1	AZ	Breda
20:00 CET (UTC+1)	Kwakman 90'	Report	Moisander 75'	Stadium: Rat Verlegh Stadion; Referee: Ed Janssen

7 February 2010 22	Feyenoord	1–2	AZ	Rotterdam
14:30 CET (UTC+1)	Wernbloom 39' (o.g.)	Report	El Hamdaoui 28'; Moreno 87'	Stadium: De Kuip; Referee: Eric Braamhaar

13 February 2010 23	AZ	2–0	Roda JC	Alkmaar
20:45 CET (UTC+1)	Kah 70' (o.g.); Elm 84'	Report		Stadium: DSB Stadion; Referee: Jan Wegereef

20 February 2010 24	VVV-Venlo	3–3	AZ	Venlo
19:45 CET (UTC+1)	Auassar 55'; Schaken 69'; Uchebo 75'	Report	Wernbloom 30'; Poulsen (yellow card) 37', (goal) 61'; El Hamdaoui 62'	Stadium: De Koel; Referee: Dick van Egmond

27 February 2010 25	Vitesse Arnhem	0–3	AZ	Arnhem
19:45 CET (UTC+1)		Report	El Hamdaoui 45', 49', 56'	Stadium: GelreDome; Referee: Pol van Boekel

6 March 2010 26	AZ	4–1	Heerenveen	Alkmaar
18:45 CET (UTC+1)	Martens 22'; Schaars (yellow card) 25'; El Hamdaoui 35'; Lens 68'; Holman 90'	Report	Đuričić 20', (yellow card) 21'	Stadium: DSB Stadion; Referee: Pieter Vink

13 March 2010 27	AZ	6–2	RKC Waalwijk	Alkmaar
19:45 CET (UTC+1)	El Hamdaoui 1', 35', 74'; Dembélé 9'; Moreno 21'; Lens 71'	Report	De Ceulaer 8'; Boerrigter 90+1'	Stadium: DSB Stadion; Referee: Michel Winter

21 March 2010 28	Sparta Rotterdam	0–1	AZ	Rotterdam
14:30 CET (UTC+1)		Report	Mendes 4'; Jaliens (yellow card) 36'; Moreno (yellow card) 85'	Stadium: Sparta Stadion Het Kasteel; Referee: Björn Kuipers

27 March 2010 29	AZ	3–2	Heracles	Alkmaar
19:45 CET (UTC+1)	Lens 40', 64', 84'; Moreno (yellow card) 76'	Report	Douglas 72'; Armenteros 79'	Stadium: DSB Stadion; Referee: Jan Wegereef

3 April 2010 30	AZ	2–0	Utrecht	Alkmaar
19:45 CEST (UTC+2)	Martens 4'; El Hamdaoui 75' (pen.)	Report		Stadium: DSB Stadion; Referee: Kevin Blom

10 April 2010 31	NEC	0–0	AZ	Nijmegen
19:45 CEST (UTC+2)	Vleminckx (yellow card) 20'; Fejzullahu (yellow card) 72'	Report		Stadium: Goffertstadion; Referee: Eric Braamhaar

13 April 2010 32	AZ	1–0	Twente	Alkmaar
20:00 CEST (UTC+2)	El Hamdaoui 8'	Report		Stadium: DSB Stadion; Referee: Pieter Vink

18 April 2010 33	Willem II	0–3	AZ	Tilburg
14:30 CEST (UTC+2)		Report	Moreno 12'; Holman 71'; El Hamdaoui 78'	Stadium: Koning Willem II Stadion; Referee: Bas Nijhuis

2 May 2010 34	AZ	1–1	PSV	Alkmaar
14:30 CEST (UTC+2)	Moisander (yellow card) 60'; El Hamdaoui 69'	Report	Bakkal 61', (yellow card) 85'	Stadium: DSB Stadion; Referee: Bas Nijhuis

=== KNVB Cup ===
22 September 2009 Second round	AZ	2–0 (a.e.t.)	Jong Ajax	Alkmaar
20:45 CEST (UTC+2)	Dembélé 91', 94'	Report		Stadium: DSB Stadion

28 October 2009 Third round	AZ	5–2 (a.e.t.)	Spakenburg	Alkmaar
20:00 CET (UTC+1)	Wernbloom 51', 105'; Schaars 76'; Jonathas 113'; El Hamdaoui 120'	Report	Houwing 6'; Bonevacia 90'	Stadium: DSB Stadion; Referee: Ruud Bossen

22 December 2009 Fourth Round	Feyenoord	1–0	AZ	Rotterdam
20:45 CET (UTC+1)	Wijnaldum 41'	Report		Stadium: De Kuip; Referee: Jack van Hulten

=== UEFA Champions League ===
==== Group stage ====
Pos	Team	Pld	W	D	L	GF	GA	GD	Pts	Qualification	ARS	OLY	STL	AZ
1	(England) Arsenal	6	4	1	1	12	5	+7	13	Advance to knockout phase	—	2–0	2–0	4–1
2	(Greece) Olympiacos	6	3	1	2	4	5	−1	10	Advance to knockout phase	1–0	—	2–1	1–0
3	(Belgium) Standard Liège	6	1	2	3	7	9	−2	5	Transfer to Europa League	2–3	2–0	—	1–1
4	(Netherlands) AZ	6	0	4	2	4	8	−4	4		1–1	0–0	1–1	—

Source: RSSSF

16 September 2009 1	Olympiacos (Greece)	1–0	(Netherlands) AZ	Athens, Greece
21:45 EEST (UTC+3)	Torosidis 79'	Report	Mendes (yellow card) 37'; Schaars (yellow card) 84'	Stadium: Karaiskakis Stadium; Attendance: 29,018; Referee: Viktor Kassai (Hungary)

29 September 2009 2	AZ (Netherlands)	1–1	(Belgium) Standard Liège	Alkmaar, Netherlands
20:45 CEST (UTC+2)	El Hamdaoui (yellow card) 18', (goal) 48'	Report	Sarr (yellow card) 40'; Jovanović (yellow card) 63'; Traoré 90+1'	Stadium: DSB Stadion; Attendance: 16,373; Referee: Wolfgang Stark (Germany)

20 October 2009 3	AZ (Netherlands)	1–1	(England) Arsenal	Alkmaar, Netherlands
20:45 CEST (UTC+2)	Lens (yellow card) 89'; Mendes 90+3'	Report	Fàbregas 36'; Van Persie (yellow card) 48'; Clichy (yellow card) 66'; Vela (yellow card) 77'	Stadium: DSB Stadion; Attendance: 16,666; Referee: Martin Hansson (Sweden)

4 November 2009 4	Arsenal (England)	4–1	(Netherlands) AZ	London, England
19:45 GMT (UTC)	Fàbregas 25', 52'; Nasri 43'; Diaby 72'	Report	Moisander (yellow card) 66'; Lens 82'	Stadium: Emirates Stadium; Attendance: 59,345; Referee: Alain Hamer (Luxembourg)

24 November 2009 5	AZ (Netherlands)	0–0	(Greece) Olympiacos	Alkmaar, Netherlands
20:45 EET (UTC+2)	Pocognoli (yellow card) 65'; Moreno (yellow card) 90+1'	Report	Mitroglou (yellow card) 73'; Bravo (yellow card) 81'	Stadium: DSB Stadion; Attendance: 16,213; Referee: Alberto Undiano Mallenco (Spain)

9 December 2009 6	Standard Liège (Belgium)	1–1	(Netherlands) AZ	Liège, Belgium
20:45 CET (UTC+1)	Traoré (yellow card) 90'; Bolat 90+5'	Report	Lens 42'; Pocognoli (yellow card) 43'; Jaliens (yellow card) 87'	Stadium: Stade Maurice Dufrasne; Attendance: 24,359; Referee: Martin Atkinson (England)
