= 2008–09 AZ Alkmaar season =

AZ Alkmaar
2008–09 season
- Manager: Louis van Gaal
- Stadium: AFAS Stadion
- Eredivisie: 1st
- KNVB Cup: Quarter-finals
- Top goalscorer: League: Mounir El Hamdaoui (23); All: Mounir El Hamdaoui (24)

During the 2008–09 Dutch football season, AZ Alkmaar competed in the Eredivisie, playing their 42nd season of competitive football (Alkmaar '54 and FC Zaanstreek had merged to form AZ in May 1967).

== Season summary ==
The club won its first Eredivisie title since 1981 and remains the second top flight title in its history to this day. The club secured 80 points in the 34 games under Louis van Gaal and finished 11 points ahead of second placed FC Twente. AZ were knocked out of the KNVB Cup in the quarterfinals suffering a 2–1 home loss to NAC Breda, although they did secure a notable 1-0 (aet) win over PSV Eindhoven in the third round.

van Gaal left the club at the end of the season to join FC Bayern Munich and was succeeded by Ronald Koeman.

== First-team squad ==
Squad at end of season

Note: Flags indicate national team as defined under FIFA eligibility rules; some limited exceptions apply. Players may hold more than one non-FIFA nationality.

No.	Pos.	Nation	Player
1	GK	(Croatia) CRO	Joey Didulica (Note: Didulica was born in Geelong, Australia, and represented them at U-23 level, but also qualified to represent Croatia internationally through his parents and made his international debut for Croatia in April 2004.)
2	DF	(Netherlands) NED	Kew Jaliens
3	DF	(Netherlands) NED	Gijs Luirink
4	DF	(Mexico) MEX	Héctor Moreno
5	DF	(Belgium) BEL	Sébastien Pocognoli
6	MF	(Netherlands) NED	David Mendes da Silva
7	MF	(Netherlands) NED	Jeremain Lens
8	MF	(Netherlands) NED	Stijn Schaars
9	FW	(Brazil) BRA	Ari
10	FW	(Morocco) MAR	Mounir El Hamdaoui (Note: El Hamdaoui was born in Rotterdam, Netherlands, and represented them at U-21 level, but also qualified to represent Morocco internationally and made his international debut for Morocco in February 2009.)
11	MF	(Belgium) BEL	Maarten Martens
14	DF	(Estonia) EST	Ragnar Klavan
15	DF	(Denmark) DEN	Simon Poulsen
16	MF	(Finland) FIN	Toni Kolehmainen

No.	Pos.	Nation	Player
18	MF	(Belgium) BEL	Mousa Dembélé
19	DF	(Netherlands) NED	Kees Luijckx
20	MF	(Netherlands) NED	Demy de Zeeuw
22	GK	(Argentina) ARG	Sergio Romero
23	MF	(Netherlands) NED	Nick van der Velden
24	MF	(Australia) AUS	James Holland
25	DF	(Finland) FIN	Niklas Moisander
26	MF	(Netherlands) NED	Marko Vejinović
27	MF	(Australia) AUS	Brett Holman
28	DF	(Belgium) BEL	Gill Swerts
29	FW	(Italy) ITA	Graziano Pellè
—	MF	(Netherlands) NED	Kevin Brands
—	MF	(Iceland) ISL	Jóhann Berg Guðmundsson

=== Left club during season ===
Note: Flags indicate national team as defined under FIFA eligibility rules; some limited exceptions apply. Players may hold more than one non-FIFA nationality.

No.	Pos.	Nation	Player
10	MF	(Germany) GER	Simon Cziommer (on loan to FC Utrecht)
12	DF	(Netherlands) NED	Milano Koenders (on loan to NEC Nijmegen)
14	MF	(Netherlands) NED	Ryan Donk (on loan to West Bromwich Albion)

No.	Pos.	Nation	Player
21	GK	(Netherlands) NED	Boy Waterman (on loan to ADO Den Haag)
33	MF	(Netherlands) NED	Gregory Nelson (on loan to RBC Roosendaal)
