= 2009 Johan Cruyff Shield =

Johan Cruijff Schaal XIV
SC Heerenveen	AZ
1	5
- Date: 25 July 2009
- Venue: Amsterdam Arena, Amsterdam
- Referee: Björn Kuipers
- Attendance: 25,000

The fourteenth edition of the Johan Cruyff Shield (Dutch: Johan Cruijff Schaal) was held on 25 July 2009 at the Amsterdam Arena. The match featured the 2008–09 Eredivisie champions AZ and 2008–09 KNVB Cup winners SC Heerenveen. The match inaugurated the 2009–10 season in Dutch football.

== Match details ==
25 July 2009

SC Heerenveen	1–5	AZ
Papadopulos 60'	Report	Holman 15'; El Hamdaoui 25'; Martens 28'; Lens 67', 87'

Amsterdam Arena, Amsterdam
Attendance: 25,000
Referee: Björn Kuipers

Heerenveen	AZ

GK	1	(Belgium) Kenny Steppe
RB	19	(Netherlands) Daryl Janmaat
CB	4	(Netherlands) Michel Breuer (c)	(yellow card) 10'
CB	6	(Serbia) Igor Đurić		(substituted off) 71'
LB	20	(North Macedonia) Goran Popov
CM	17	(Norway) Christian Grindheim		(substituted off) 61'
CM	15	(Czech Republic) Michal Švec
CM	7	(Sweden) Viktor Elm
RW	8	(Netherlands) Roy Beerens
CF	35	(Netherlands) Gerald Sibon
LW	11	(Czech Republic) Michal Papadopulos		(substituted off) 62'
Substitutes:
MF	21	(Ivory Coast) Bonaventure Kalou		(substituted in) 61'
FW	12	(Brazil) Paulo Henrique		(substituted in) 62'
DF	3	(Denmark) Kristian Bak Nielsen		(substituted in) 71'
Manager:
(Norway) Trond Sollied

GK	22	(Argentina) Sergio Romero	(substituted off) 87'
RB	2	(Netherlands) Kew Jaliens
CB	25	(Finland) Niklas Moisander
CB	4	(Mexico) Héctor Moreno
LB	5	(Belgium) Sébastien Pocognoli
RM	27	(Australia) Brett Holman	(substituted off) 66'
CM	6	(Netherlands) David Mendes da Silva
CM	8	(Netherlands) Stijn Schaars (c)
LM	11	(Belgium) Maarten Martens
CF	10	(Morocco) Mounir El Hamdaoui	(substituted off) 81'
CF	7	(Netherlands) Jeremain Lens
Substitutes:
MF	18	(Belgium) Mousa Dembélé	(substituted in) 66'
MF	23	(Netherlands) Nick van der Velden	(substituted in) 81'
GK	1	(Croatia) Joey Didulica	(substituted in) 87'
Manager:
(Netherlands) Ronald Koeman
