= Sébastien Pocognoli =

Belgian footballer (born 1987)

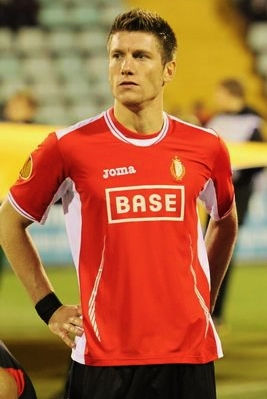
- Pocognoli playing for Standard Liège in 2011

Personal information
- Full name: Sébastien Jean Pocognoli
- Date of birth: 1 August 1987 (age 39)
- Place of birth: Seraing, Belgium
- Height: 1.82 m (6 ft 0 in)
- Position: Left-back

Team information
- Current team: Scotland (head coach)

Youth career
- 2000–2004: Standard Liège

Senior career*
Years	Team	Apps	(Gls)
2004–2007	Genk	45	(1)
2007–2010	AZ	64	(5)
2010–2013	Standard Liège	85	(2)
2013–2014	Hannover 96	30	(0)
2014–2017	West Bromwich Albion	16	(0)
2016–2017	→ Brighton & Hove Albion (loan)	20	(1)
2017–2020	Standard Liège	32	(2)
2020–2021	Union SG	7	(0)
Total		299	(11)

International career
2002–2003	Belgium U16	19	(1)
2003–2004	Belgium U17	13	(2)
2004–2006	Belgium U19	20	(2)
2006–2008	Belgium U21	12	(1)
2008	Belgium Olympic	6	(0)
2008–2014	Belgium	13	(0)

Managerial career
- 2023–2024: Belgium U18
- 2024–2025: Union SG
- 2025–2026: Monaco
- 2026–: Scotland
- * Club domestic league appearances and goals

Sébastien Jean Pocognoli (Poc-in-YO-lee) (born 1 August 1987) is a Belgian football coach and former player who is the head coach of the Scotland national team.

A left-back, Pocognoli played for Standard Liège, Genk, AZ, Hannover 96, West Bromwich Albion, Brighton & Hove Albion and Union SG.

A Belgian youth international from under-16 to under-23 levels, he earned 13 caps for the Belgium senior national team.

== Early and personal life ==
Born in Seraing, Pocognoli is of Italian descent.

Pocognoli revealed that his father worked next to the stadium. Growing up, he revealed that he initially hated football, but thanks to his stubborn father, he grew to like football as a sport.

== Club career ==
=== Genk ===
Pocognoli began his career with the youth team of Standard Liège, but left at the age of 15 to join Genk, where the club offered him a professional contract and felt Standard Liège would not give him first-team opportunities if he had stayed.

Pocognoli made his Genk debut, where he came on as a substitute for Marco Ingrao in the second half, in a 1–0 win over Gent on 9 April 2004, which was his sole appearance that season. However, the new manager René Vandereycken sent him to the reserve team the following season. In 2006, he made a first-team breakthrough at the club, and played his first game for the previous two years on 22 January 2006, where he made his first start and played 69 minutes before being substituted in a 2–1 loss against Charleroi. In the next game against Westerlo on 28 January 2006, Pocognoli scored his first Genk goal (and his first professional goal), in a 2–0 win. He finished the 2005–06 season with fifteen appearances and one goal.

Despite interest from clubs like Eredivisie side Ajax and Premier League side Tottenham Hotspur, Pocognoli ended up staying at the club and did well when he set up a goal for Ivan Bošnjak, in a 1–1 draw against Standard Liège on 19 August 2006. Three days later, Pocognoli signed a new contract with Genk, keeping him until 2008 and two months later, he signed another contract extension with the club, keeping him until 2011 Despite being sent–off for a second bookable offence against Sint-Truidense on 29 October 2006, Pocognoli became a regular for the club during the 2006–07 season, making thirty–four appearances in all competition. At the end of the 2006–07 season, Pocognoli was nominated for the Young Player Footballer of the Year award, but lost out to Lucas Biglia.

=== AZ ===
On 20 June 2007, Pocognoli left Genk to join Eredivisie side AZ, signing a five–year contract with them. The fee was worth about €2.75 million. Upon joining the club, Pocognoli revealed that he had an offer to join Bayer Leverkusen, but opted for AZ instead.

Pocognoli made his AZ debut when he came on as a substitute in the second half in a 4–0 win over VVV-Venlo in the opening game of the season. Pocognoli then scored his first goal for the club, in the UEFA Cup match, in a 1–0 win over Paços de Ferreira on 20 September 2007. Pocognoli scored his first league goal for the club on 9 December 2007, in a 2–1 win over Utrecht and his second later came on 22 January 2008, in a 2–1 loss against NAC Breda. Despite being absent several times, Pocognoli went on to make thirty–three appearances and scoring three times in all competition, under the management of Louis van Gaal.

In the 2008–09 season, Pocognoli continued to be in the first team regular at the club and then scored his first goal of the season, just coming on as a substitute, in a 3–3 draw against Heerenveen on 1 November 2008. His second goal for the club later came on 21 January 2009, in a 3–0 win over Achilles '29 and three days later on 24 January 2009, he scored again in a 2–0 win over De Graafschap. As the 2008–09 season, Pocognoli suffered an injury, which kept him out for six weeks. Despite this, he helped the club win the league for the first time since 1981 after title contender Ajax lost 6–2 to PSV on 18 April 2009. Pocognoli went on to make twenty–seven appearances and scoring three times in all competition in the 2008–09 season.

Ahead of the 2009–10 season, Pocognoli surprisingly attracted interest from La Liga side Barcelona. He ended the transfer speculation when he signed a contract with the club on 14 June 2009, keeping him until 2014. Pocognoli helped the club win the Johan Cruyff Shield, where he set up one of the goals, in a 5–1 win over Heereveen. However, his first team opportunities was limited under the new management of Ronald Koeman, due to injury and spent most of the first half of the season on the substitute bench. Despite this, Pocognoli set up one of the goals in the Group Stage match of the UEFA Champions League, in a 1–1 draw against Standard Liège on 9 December 2009 and then scored his first goal for the club, in a 3–0 win over ADO Den Haag a week later on 19 December 2009.

During his time at AZ, Pocognoli later credit Van Gaal for his role of helping his formation as a footballer.

=== Standard Liège ===
On 23 January 2010, Pocognoli was in a negotiation with a move to Belgian Pro League, signing for his former club Standard Liège. The move was confirmed the next day, where he signed a three–year contract, keeping him until 2014. Upon joining the club, Pocognoli was given number thirty–five shirt for the new season.

Pocognoli made his Standard Liege debut, where he made his first start and played the whole game, in a 1–0 loss against his former club, Genk on 7 February 2010, followed up by scoring his first goal, in a 1–0 win over Westerlo in the next game. Despite suffering from an injury, Pocognoli returned to the first team from injury, where he set up one of the goals, in a 1–1 draw against Zulte Waregem on 14 March 2010. Pocognoli went on to make sixteen appearances and score once in all competition in the second half of the season.

In the 2010–11 season, Pocognoli started well, scoring his first goal in a 4–0 win over Lierse on 6 August 2010. However, in a match against Sint-Truidense on 20 August 2010, Pocognoli was sent off after a second bookable offence, in a 1–0 loss. Pocognoli was sent off for the second time this season after a second bookable, in a 1–0 win over Germinal Beerschot on 13 November 2010. Despite suffering from an injury in the last game of the season, Pocognoli finished the 2010–11 season, making forty appearances and scoring once in all competitions.

In the 2011–12 season, Pocognoli continued to become a first-team regular at left–back and did well when he set up the only goal in a 1–0 win over Zulte Waregem on 23 October 2011. Two weeks later on 6 November 2011, Pocognoli, once again, set up one of the goals, in a 2–1 win over Club Brugge. Three weeks later on 25 November 2011, Pocognoli then set up one of the goals, in a 3–2 win over Mechelen. Pocognoli went on to finish the 2011–12 season, making fifty–one appearances in all competition.

In the 2012–13 season, Pocognoli missed the opening game of the season after being suspended, but continued to manage his first-team place following his return. However, Pocognoli suffered injuries in the first half of the season. After almost absent for two months, Pocognoli returned to the first team, where he came on as a substitute in the second half, in a 6–1 win over Charleroi on 7 December 2012. Pocognoli made eleven appearances in all competitions in the first half of the season at the club.

=== Hannover 96 ===
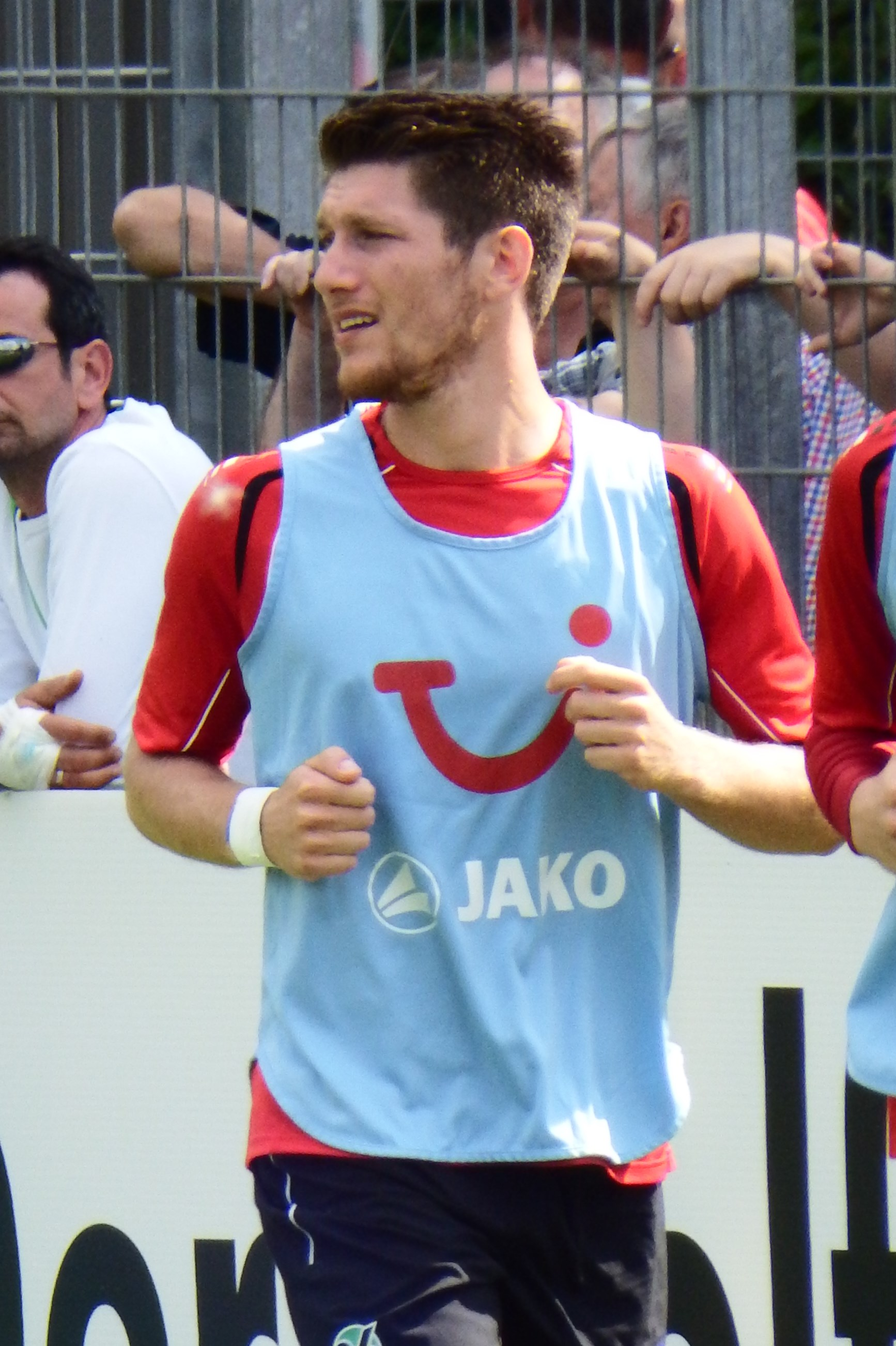
Pocognoli training with Hannover 96.

On 22 January 2013, Pocognoli left Belgium when he moved to German club Hannover 96, signing a three–year contract, keeping him until 2016.

Pocognoli made his Hannover 96 debut against Wolfsburg three days later, where he made his first start, but in the 34th minute, he was sent off on his debut for the club. After serving a three match suspension, Pocognoli made his first team return, where he made his second start, in a 5–1 win over Hamburg on 23 February 2013. In a match against Augsburg on 30 March 2013, Pocognoli then set up one of the goals, in a 2–0 win. Despite missing out, due to injuries, Pocognoli finished the second half of the 2012–13 season, making eleven appearances in all competitions.

In the 2013–14 season, Pocognoli continued to keep his first-team place despite competing with Christian Pander over a left–back position. Pocognoli continued to regain his left–back position in the first half of the season until he suffered injuries that affected most of the season. Despite this, Pocognoli finished the 2013–14 season, making twenty appearances in all competition.

=== West Bromwich Albion ===
On 12 July 2014, Pocognoli left Hannover 96 to sign for Premier League side West Bromwich Albion for a fee of £1,500,000, signing a three–year contract, with a year's option. Upon joining the club, Pocognoli was given the number fifteen shirt.

After making his first start in the pre–season friendly game against Shrewsbury Town, Pocognoli made his West Bromwich Albion debut, in the opening game of the season, playing the full 90 minutes of a 2–2 draw against Sunderland. After missing a game, due to a thigh injury he sustained during a match against Southampton, Pocognoli made his return from injury, in a 2–0 loss against Everton on 13 September 2014. However, as the 2014–15 season progressed, Pocognoli lost his first team place following the arrival of new manager Tony Pulis, who preferred Chris Brunt, Chris Baird and Joleon Lescott in the left back role, as well as being hampered by injury concerns. Pocognoli ended his first season at West Brom with 16 appearances to his name.

Ahead of the 2015–16 season, Pocognoli considered leaving the club, citing a lack of first team opportunities. Though Pulis openly admitted Pocognoli could leave if the club's valuation was met, Pocognoli stayed at the club throughout pre-season and made his first appearance of the season in a 3–0 loss against Norwich City in the second round of League Cup. After being placed on the transfer list by West Brom during the January 2016 transfer window, Pocognoli was expected to leave the club, but no move materialised. Following this, Pocognoli said he was still determined to fight for a first team place, having only made 4 appearances in the 2015–16 season. Pocognoli finally made his first league appearance of the season, and set up Salomón Rondón to score the only goal, in a 1–0 win over Manchester United on 6 March 2016. This was to be his only Premier League appearance of the season.

On 30 August 2016, Pocognoli joined Football League Championship club Brighton & Hove Albion on a season-long loan deal, following an injury to first-choice left-back Liam Rosenior. Competing with Gaëtan Bong for the left–back spot, Pocognoli made his Brighton & Hove Albion debut in a 0–0 draw against Ipswich Town on 27 September 2016, playing the whole match. He scored his first goal for Brighton in a 2–1 win over Queens Park Rangers on 7 April 2017. At the end of the season, having made 20 Championship appearances, Pocognoli returned to West Brom and was released at the end of his contract.

=== Return to Standard Liège ===
On 16 June 2017, Pocognoli returned to Standard Liège for a third stint at the club where he began his career.

On 17 March 2018, he played as Standard Liege beat Genk 1–0 in extra time to win the 2018 Belgian Cup Final and qualify for the UEFA Europa League. He moved to Union SG in January 2020.

== International career ==
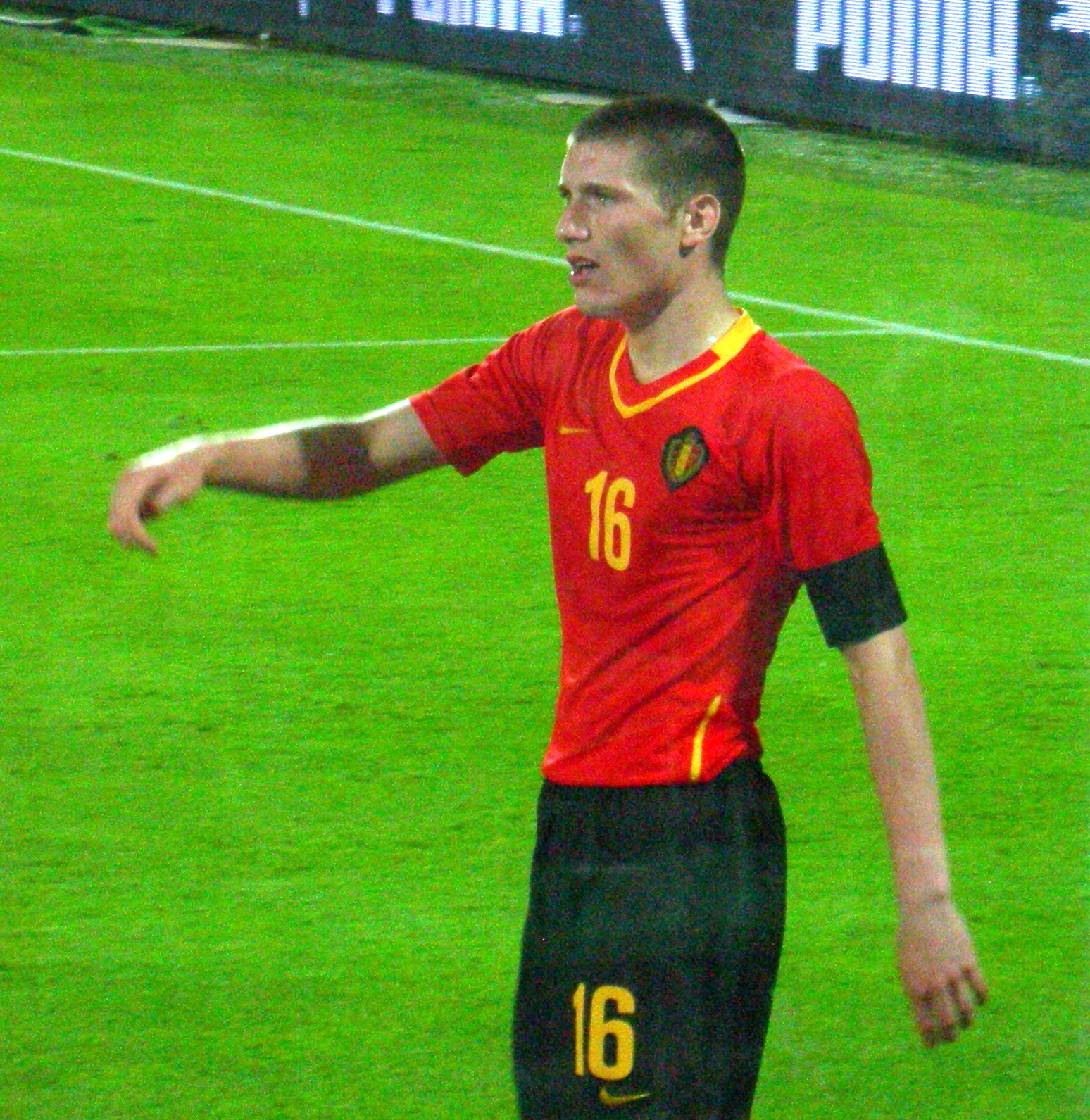
Pocognoli representing Belgium in 2008

Pocognoli played youth football for Belgium at under-16, under-17, under-19 and under-21 level. He was a squad member at the 2007 UEFA European Under-21 Football Championship. He also played at the 2008 Summer Olympics, making 6 appearances at the tournament.

After being called by the senior team for the first time on 24 May 2008, Pocognoli made his senior team debut on 30 May 2008, making his first start, in a 3–1 loss against Italy, and he has appeared in FIFA World Cup qualifying matches. While playing for the national team in 2009, Pocognoli was involved in a dressing room altercation with teammates Timmy Simons and Stijn Stijnen.

== Coaching career ==
=== Early career ===
Upon retiring from playing at the end of the 2020–21 season, he was hired by Union SG to coach their under-21 team.

Pocognoli then had stints managing Genk's under-18 team and the Belgium under-18 team.

=== Union SG ===
In July 2024 Pocognoli returned to Union SG as head coach of their first team. In his debut season as manager, Pocognoli guided Union SG to a historic league title, their first in 90 years. After finishing third in the regular season behind Genk and Club Brugge, his side went unbeaten in the Championship Playoffs, winning nine of ten matches. A decisive 1–0 away victory over leaders Club Brugge and a final-day 3–1 win against Gent sealed the title and earned them a first-ever spot in the Champions League league phase.

=== Monaco ===
On 11 October 2025, Pocognoli was announced as the new head coach of Ligue 1 side Monaco. On 1 June 2026, he was sacked by Monaco.

=== Scotland ===
On 16 August 2026, Pocognoli was announced as the new head coach of the Scotland national team, signing a two-year contract, which the BBC described as a "brave choice".

He became Scotland's second foreign head coach, after German Berti Vogts, who managed the team from 2002 to 2004. Pocognoli said he felt a connection with Scottish football, and had a "positive nervousness" ahead of his debut match. Scotland's performance in the match, a 0–0 draw with Slovenia, was described by the BBC as "mixed".

== Career statistics ==
=== Club ===
Appearances and goals by club, season and competition
Club	Season	League			National cup (Note: Includes Belgian Cup, KNVB Cup, DFB-Pokal, FA Cup)		League cup (Note: Includes Football League Cup)		Europe		Other		Total	
Club	Season	Division	Apps	Goals	Apps	Goals	Apps	Goals	Apps	Goals	Apps	Goals	Apps	Goals
Genk	2005–06	Belgian First Division	15	1	0	0	–		–		–		15	1
Genk	2006–07	Belgian First Division	30	0	0	0	–		–		–		30	0
Genk	Total		45	1	0	0	0	0	0	0	0	0	45	1
AZ	2007–08	Eredivisie	28	2	0	0	–		5 (Note: Appearances in UEFA Cup)	1	–		33	3
AZ	2008–09	Eredivisie	25	2	1	1	–		–		–		26	3
AZ	2009–10	Eredivisie	11	1	2	0	–		5 (Note: Appearances in UEFA Champions League)	0	1 (Note: Appearance in Johan Cruyff Shield)	0	19	1
AZ	Total		64	5	3	1	0	0	10	1	1	0	78	7
Standard Liège	2009–10	Belgian Pro League	10	1	0	0	–		5 (Note: Appearances in UEFA Europa League)	0	–		15	1
Standard Liège	2010–11	Belgian Pro League	34	1	6	0	–		–		–		40	1
Standard Liège	2011–12	Belgian Pro League	32	0	4	0	–		14 (Note: Two appearances in UEFA Champions League, fourteen appearances in UEFA Europa League)	0	1 (Note: Appearance in Belgian Super Cup)	0	51	0
Standard Liège	2012–13	Belgian Pro League	9	0	1	0	–		–		–		10	0
Standard Liège	Total		85	2	11	0	0	0	19	0	1	0	116	2
Hannover 96	2012–13	Bundesliga	11	0	0	0	–		2	0	–		13	0
Hannover 96	2013–14	Bundesliga	19	0	1	0	–		–		–		20	0
Hannover 96	Total		30	0	1	0	0	0	2	0	0	0	33	0
West Bromwich Albion	2014–15	Premier League	15	0	1	0	0	0	–		–		16	0
West Bromwich Albion	2015–16	Premier League	1	0	3	0	1	0	–		–		5	0
West Bromwich Albion	2016–17	Premier League	0	0	0	0	0	0	–		–		0	0
West Bromwich Albion	Total		16	0	4	0	1	0	0	0	0	0	21	0
Brighton & Hove Albion (loan)	2016–17	Championship	20	1	0	0	1	0	–		–		21	1
Standard Liège	2017–18	Belgian Pro League	24	2	3	0	–		–		–		27	2
Standard Liège	2018–19	Belgian Pro League	8	0	0	0	–		3 (Note: One appearance in UEFA Champions League, two appearances in UEFA Europa League)	0	1	0	12	0
Standard Liège	Total		32	2	3	0	0	0	3	0	1	0	39	2
Union SG	2019–20	Belgian First Division B	4	0	0	0	–		–		–		4	0
Union SG	2020–21	Belgian First Division B	3	0	0	0	–		–		–		3	0
Union SG	Total		7	0	0	0	0	0	0	0	0	0	7	0
Career total			299	11	22	1	2	0	34	1	3	0	360	13

=== International ===
Appearances and goals by national team and year
National team	Year	Apps	Goals
Belgium	2008	1	0
Belgium	2009	3	0
Belgium	2010	2	0
Belgium	2011	1	0
Belgium	2012	–	
Belgium	2013	4	0
Belgium	2014	2	0
Total		13	0

=== Managerial ===
As of 16 November 2026

Managerial record by team and tenure
Team	From	To	Record					Ref.
Team	From	To	P	W	D	L	Win %	Ref.
Union SG	7 July 2024	11 October 2025	69	39	15	15	56.52	
Monaco	11 October 2025	1 June 2026	38	16	9	13	42.11	
Scotland	16 August 2026	Present	6	2	1	3	33.33	
Total			113	57	25	31	50.44	

== Honours ==
=== Player ===
AZ

- Eredivisie: 2008–09
- Johan Cruijff Shield: 2009

Standard Liege

- Belgian Cup: 2017–18

=== Manager ===
Union SG

- Belgian Pro League: 2024–25
- Belgian Super Cup: 2024

Individual

- Belgian Coach of the Year: 2025
