= Mounir El Hamdaoui =

Footballer (born 1984)

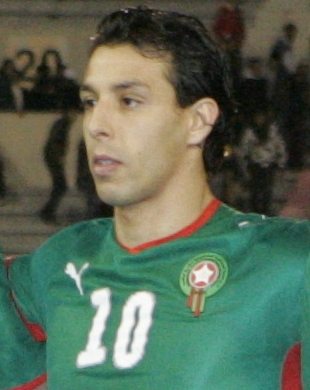
- El Hamdaoui in 2009

Personal information
- Full name: Mounir El Hamdaoui
- Date of birth: 14 July 1984 (age 42)
- Place of birth: Rotterdam, Netherlands
- Height: 1.84 m (6 ft 0 in)
- Position: Forward

Youth career
- 1996–2001: Excelsior

Senior career*
Years	Team	Apps	(Gls)
2001–2005	Excelsior	74	(32)
2005–2006	Tottenham Hotspur	0	(0)
2005–2006	→ Derby County (loan)	9	(3)
2006–2007	Willem II	6	(3)
2007–2010	AZ	81	(50)
2010–2012	Ajax	26	(13)
2012–2015	Fiorentina	22	(4)
2013–2014	→ Málaga (loan)	13	(3)
2015–2016	AZ	7	(1)
2016	Umm Salal	9	(7)
2016–2017	Al Taawoun	12	(5)
2018	Twente	5	(0)
2018–2019	Excelsior	26	(4)
2019–2020	Al Kharaitiyat	18	(9)
2020–2022	DHSC	21	(5)
Total		329	(139)

International career
2003	Netherlands U19	3	(1)
2004	Netherlands U21	3	(1)
2009–2014	Morocco	15	(3)
- * Club domestic league appearances and goals

Mounir El Hamdaoui (Arabic: منير الحمداوي; born 14 July 1984) is a former professional footballer who played as a forward. Born in the Netherlands, he represented Morocco internationally.

He played for clubs such as Tottenham Hotspur, Ajax and Málaga CF, as well as Excelsior, Derby County, Willem II, AZ Alkmaar and Fiorentina. In the 2008–09 Eredivisie, El Hamdaoui was named Dutch Footballer of the Year and became the Eredivisie top scorer as AZ Alkmaar won their second league title in their history.

Born in the Netherlands, El Hamdaoui played for their under-21 side. He decided to represent Morocco, for whom he made his debut in February 2009 in a match against the Czech Republic, and played at the 2013 Africa Cup of Nations.

== Club career ==
=== Excelsior ===
Born in Rotterdam, Netherlands, El Hamdaoui went through the youth academy of Excelsior Rotterdam, where he played together with his youth friends Robin van Persie and Saïd Boutahar. In the 2001–02 season the player made his debut for the Rotterdam side under manager Adrie Koster, scoring two goals in six appearances. El Hamdaoui played a total of 74 league matches for Excelsior, scoring 32 goals. Excelsior big brother Feyenoord was also interested in signing the player, and El Hamdaoui trained a number of times with Feyenoord's first squad, but a transfer was never realised.

=== Tottenham Hotspur ===
In January 2005 English club Tottenham Hotspur, managed by fellow Dutchman Martin Jol, signed El Hamdaoui from Excelsior on a three-and-a-half-year contract. He never made an appearance in the Premier League.

=== Derby County ===
In September 2005 El Hamdaoui joined Derby County on loan. He made six appearances, scoring two goals before a dislocated shoulder forced the loan to be cut short. Derby continued to monitor his progress and in January 2006 he returned to Pride Park for another loan spell. This too was to be disrupted due to injury, a groin problem forcing him to return to Tottenham in early March. This second loan deal was not cancelled, but after returning to duty with Derby in April, a further injury problem prematurely ended his season.

=== Willem II ===
In June 2006, El Hamdaoui moved back to his native Netherlands to play for Willem II, due to a lack of opportunities at Spurs. On 19 August 2006, he marked his league debut for Willem II by scoring in their 2–1 victory against FC Utrecht. After an impressive start scoring three goals in four matches he again suffered an injury which prevented him playing for nine months. El Hamdaoui only played seven competitive matches for the Tilburg side, scoring three goals. In his second season at the Willem II, he left the club after two league matches to join AZ.

=== AZ ===
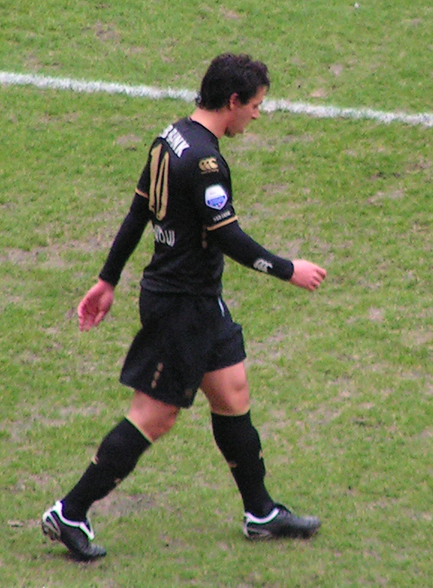
El Hamdaoui with AZ

On 31 August 2007, El Hamdaoui signed with AZ Alkmaar until 2011 as a replacement for Danny Koevermans who left for PSV Eindhoven. On 16 September 2007, he scored on his debut for AZ in a league match against Sparta Rotterdam. By the end of his first season at AZ, he had scored 7 goals in 23 league matches.

The 2008–09 season proved to be an excellent one for El Hamdaoui and AZ. He scored in the first game of the season against NAC Breda, although AZ lost 2–1. By the winter break, he had scored 16 goals in 17 league matches, including a hattrick against his old club Willem II. At the winter break, AZ was leading the league table, and El Hamdaoui was leading the goal-scoring charts. By the end of the season, AZ had won the second championship in their history, and El Hamdaoui was the top scorer in the Eredivisie, with 23 goals in 31 matches, one more than Ajax's Luis Suárez. He was also named the Dutch Footballer of the Year.

At the beginning of the 2009–10 season, there were a lot of changes at AZ. Manager Louis van Gaal had departed the club to go to FC Bayern Munich, and was replaced by Ronald Koeman. Defending champions AZ had a bad start to the season, although El Hamdaoui still managed to score 9 goals in 11 matches by the winter break. AZ found themselves in eighth place with 28 points in 20 matches, 24 points behind leaders PSV. Just before the winter break, Koeman was fired and veteran manager Dick Advocaat was brought in to take over. Russia manager Advocaat stated that he expected at least 15 or 16 goals from the player, El Hamdaoui stated "Advocaat knows what he's talking about, I think. It gives me confidence, I know what I can do."

=== Ajax ===
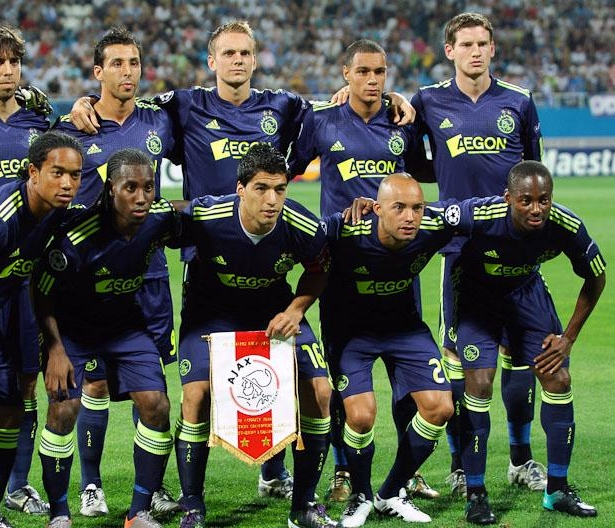
El Hamdaoui (second from top left) with Ajax teammates in 2010

On 30 July 2010, El Hamdaoui signed a four-year deal with Ajax, rejoining with his former Spurs manager Martin Jol. El Hamdaoui marked his league début for Ajax with two goals against Groningen on 8 August 2010. He scored a goal in the play-off round second leg of the 2010–11 UEFA Champions League against Dynamo Kyiv, helping Ajax win 2–1 on aggregate and ending a five-year drought from this competition. He scored his first Champions League goal with his new club, netting the opener against Milan, with the game ending 1–1.

During the 2010–11 season, El Hamdaoui fell out of favour with manager Frank de Boer following a dispute. De Boer, discontent with his performance despite a goal, substituted El Hamdaoui at half-time in the semi-final of KNVB Cup against RKC Waalwijk.

In August 2011 manager Frank de Boer confirmed interest from Premier League club Blackburn Rovers for El Hamdaoui. As the season went on, more European clubs were reported to be interested in El Hamdaoui, including Galatasaray and Espanyol.

At the end of the transfer window El Hamdaoui stayed at Ajax but did not play any part in the 2011–12 season due to his troubled relationship with De Boer. He played matches with Jong Ajax and while he was listed in the squad registered for the Champions League group stages, along with Ismaïl Aissati, who had been demoted to the second string at the beginning of the season as well, neither of them made any appearances or played any part in the competition. Frank de Boer explained his reason for registering them as him making players eligible in case he were to be relieved of his managerial duties, so that a potential successor would have the full squad at his disposal. Aissati afterwards found his way back into the first team.

=== Fiorentina ===
In July 2012, El Hamdaoui finally left Ajax and signed with Fiorentina receiving the number 9 shirt and signing a three-year deal. On 11 November 2012 he scored his first goal in Italy in a 3–1 victory away to Milan.

On 14 December 2014, El Hamdaoui scored in his first appearance of the season coming on as a substitute in the 85th minute in a game against Cesena. His contract with Fiorentina expired at the end of the 2014–15 season.

==== Loan to Málaga ====
El Hamdaoui joined La Liga club Málaga on loan in August 2013. On 15 September 2013, he scored a hat-trick against Rayo Vallecano in a 5−0 home win. In December 2019 he was removed from first-team contention, which according to head coach Bernd Schuster was due to weight issues.

=== Later career ===
After having previously practiced with Excelsior, he began a trial at his former club AZ on 13 September 2015. There, he signed a contract for the remainder of the season on 20 October 2015. However, he left AZ again in January.

In January 2016, El Hamdaoui signed with Qatari club Umm Salal. Seven months later he joined Al-Taawoun, the number four of the Saudi Professional League in the previous season.

After El Hamdaoui became a free agent in May 2017, he practiced at AZ to stay in shape. He practiced with Jong FC Twente in January 2018. He played a friendly match with Twente on 14 January and signed a six-month contract with the club three days later. He suffered relegation with the Eredivisie club at the end of the season. In September 2018, El Hamdaoui signed a contract with Excelsior until the end of the 2018–19 season. With that club, he was also relegated.

In August 2019, El Hamdaoui continued his career with Al-Kharaitiyat, who played in the second-tier of Qatar. In October 2020, he joined DHSC, competing in the Dutch fifth tier Hoofdklasse, after Wesley Sneijder who was involved in the club, asked him to join. He made his debut for the club on 13 October in a 5–5 draw in the KNVB District Cup to VV Jonathan from Zeist, also scoring a goal in the 49th minute. DHSC subsequently lost the penalty shootout. Ahead of the match, the amateur divisions had been suspended due to the COVID-19 pandemic, making the match his first and last appearance for the club for a while. On 2 October 2021, he scored his first goal in the Hoofdklasse in a 3–1 loss to ARC.

El Hamdaoui left DHSC in June 2022, and initially joined SteDoCo, before cancelling his contract in August 2022 to pursue a career as a football agent for youth players of AZ Alkmaar.

After retiring as a player, el Hamdaoui was appointed technical director at Moroccan side CR Al Hoceima.

== International career ==
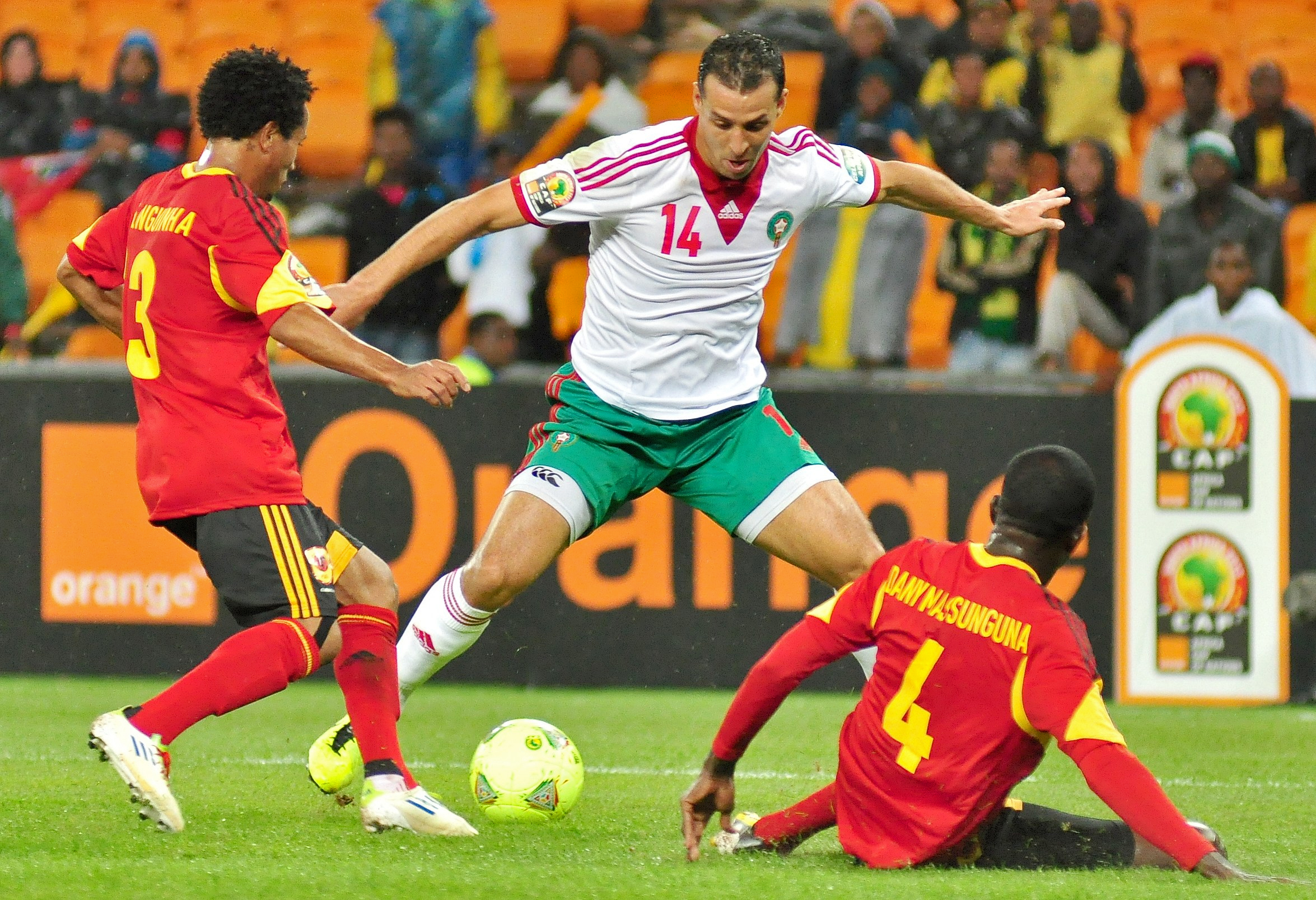
El Hamdaoui (centre) takes on two Angolan defenders at the 2013 Africa Cup of Nations.

Although being born in the Netherlands and having played for their under-21 side, El Hamdaoui pledged his international future to the Morocco national team. El Hamdaoui played his only game with Morocco B in 2005 against Saudi Arabia.

On 6 November 2006, El Hamdaoui stated in an interview to Dutch football magazine Voetbal International that he, at one point, wanted to play senior international football for the Morocco national team. A few months before he had said to the same magazine that he would choose the Netherlands if national coach Marco van Basten called him up.

He was selected to join the Moroccan national team and made his first international cap with the team on 11 February 2009 against the Czech Republic. El Hamdaoui struck his first goal in the 84th minute in a 2–1 loss to Gabon in March 2009. His second international goal came in the 2012 Africa Cup of Nations qualification against Tanzania on 9 October 2010, where he scored the only goal in a 1–0 win, assisted by Marouane Chamakh.

== Career statistics ==
=== Club ===
Appearances and goals by club, season and competition
Club	Season	League			National cup (Note: Includes KNVB Cup, Coppa Italia)		Continental		Other		Total	
Club	Season	Division	Apps	Goals	Apps	Goals	Apps	Goals	Apps	Goals	Apps	Goals
Excelsior	2001–02	Eerste Divisie	6	2	0	0	–		5	0	11	2
Excelsior	2002–03	Eredivisie	21	2	7	6	–		6	2	34	10
Excelsior	2003–04	Eerste Divisie	33	17	3	2	–		6	4	42	23
Excelsior	2004–05	Eerste Divisie	14	11	1	2	–		–		15	13
Excelsior	Total		74	32	11	10	–		17	6	102	48
Derby County	2005–06	Championship	9	3	0	0	–		–		9	3
Willem II	2006–07	Eredivisie	4	3	0	0	–		–		4	3
Willem II	2007–08	Eredivisie	2	0	0	0	–		–		2	0
Willem II	Total		6	3	0	0	0	0	0	0	6	3
AZ	2007–08	Eredivisie	23	7	1	0	3	0	–		27	7
AZ	2008–09	Eredivisie	31	23	3	1	–		–		34	24
AZ	2009–10	Eredivisie	27	20	2	1	4 (Note: Appearances in UEFA Champions League)	1	1 (Note: Appearance in Johan Cruyff Shield)	1	34	23
AZ	Total		81	50	6	2	7	1	1	1	95	54
Ajax	2010–11	Eredivisie	26	13	2	3	10 (Note: Eight appearances and two goals in UEFA Champions League, two appearances and one goal in UEFA Europa League)	3	–		38	19
Fiorentina	2012–13	Serie A	19	3	1	0	–		–		20	3
Fiorentina	2014–15	Serie A	3	1	0	0	0	0	–		3	1
Fiorentina	Total		22	4	1	0	0	0	–		23	4
Málaga (loan)	2013–14	La Liga	13	3	0	0	–		–		13	3
AZ	2015–16	Eredivisie	7	1	0	0	–		–		7	1
Umm Salal	2015–16	Qatar Stars League	9	7	0	0	–		–		9	7
Al-Taawoun	2016–17	Saudi Pro League	12	5	0	0	–		–		12	5
Twente	2017–18	Eredivisie	5	0	1	0	–		–		6	0
Excelsior	2018–19	Eredivisie	26	4	1	0	–		1	0	28	4
Al Kharaitiyat	2019–20	Qatari Second Division	18	9	0	0	–		–		18	9
DHSC	2021–22	Hoofdklasse	21	5	0	0	–		–		21	5
Career total			329	139	22	15	17	4	8	5	376	163

=== International ===
Scores and results list Morocco's goal tally first, score column indicates score after each El Hamdaoui goal.

List of international goals scored by Mounir El Hamdaoui
No.	Date	Venue	Opponent	Score	Result	Competition
1	28 March 2009	Stade Mohamed V, Casablanca, Morocco	Gabon	1–2	1–2	2010 FIFA World Cup qualification
2	9 October 2010	Benjamin Mkapa National Stadium, Dar-es-Salaam, Tanzania	Tanzania	1–0	1–0	2012 Africa Cup of Nations qualification
3	12 January 2013	Stade Mohamed V, Casablanca, Morocco	Namibia	1–0	2–1	Friendly

== Honours ==
AZ

- Eredivisie: 2008–09
- Johan Cruyff Shield: 2009

Ajax

- Eredivisie: 2010–11

Individual

- Dutch Footballer of the Year: 2008–09
- Eredivisie top scorer: 2008–09
