= Martin Lejsal =

Czech footballer (born 1982)

Personal information
- Date of birth: 16 September 1982 (age 44)
- Place of birth: Kyjov, Czechoslovakia
- Height: 1.96 m (6 ft 5 in)
- Position: Goalkeeper

Youth career
- 1987–1993: FC Vracov
- 1993–1995: Baník Ratíškovice
- 1995–2001: Zlín

Senior career*
Years	Team	Apps	(Gls)
1999–2001	Zlín	29	(0)
2001–2003	Reggina Calcio	2	(0)
2004	Slovan Liberec	2	(0)
2004	Reggina Calcio	2	(0)
2004–2005	Venezia	10	(0)
2005	Padova	0	(0)
2006–2009	1. FC Brno	73	(0)
2009–2010	SC Heerenveen	10	(0)
2010	Zbrojovka Brno	11	(0)
2011	Rostov	0	(0)

International career
2000–2001	Czech Republic U-18	8	(0)
2002–2003	Czech Republic U-21	2	(0)
- * Club domestic league appearances and goals

Martin Lejsal (born 16 September 1982) is a Czech former football player who played as a goalkeeper. He played in several countries, but mostly at home for FC Zbrojovka Brno.

In July 2005 he was banned for 6 months due to Caso Genoa.
