= Paulo Henrique (footballer, born March 1989) =

Brazilian footballer

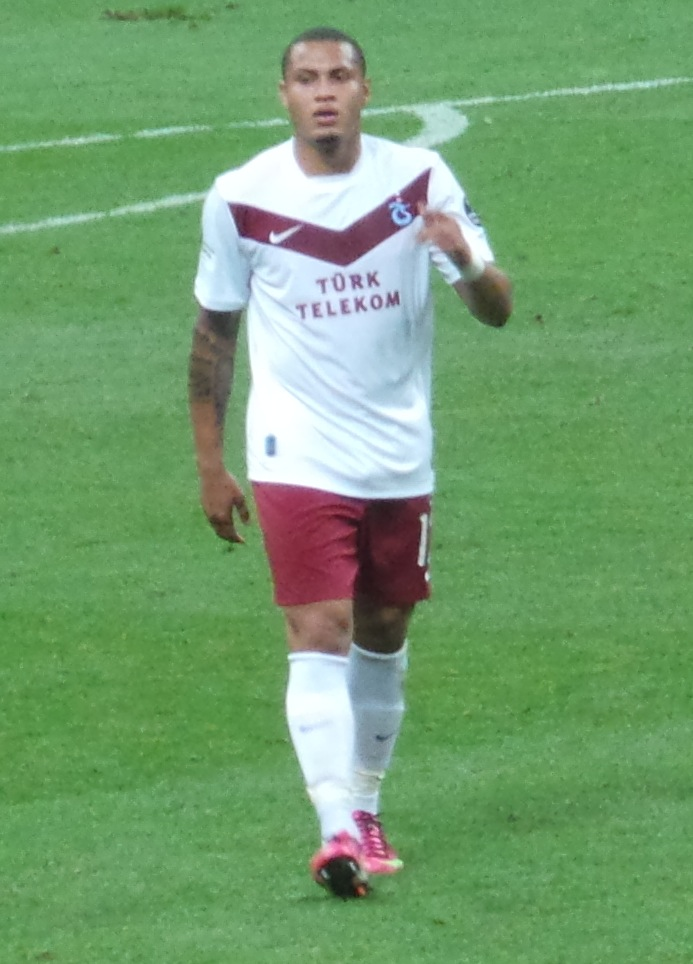
- Paulo Henrique in 2013

Personal information
- Full name: Paulo Henrique Carneiro Filho
- Date of birth: 13 March 1989 (age 37)
- Place of birth: João Pessoa, Brazil
- Height: 1.85 m (6 ft 1 in)
- Position: Forward

Youth career
- 2004–2006: Atlético Mineiro

Senior career*
Years	Team	Apps	(Gls)
2006–2007	Atlético Mineiro	13	(3)
2007–2010	Heerenveen	55	(18)
2010–2011	Desportivo Brasil	0	(0)
2010	→ Palmeiras (loan)	5	(0)
2010–2011	→ Westerlo (loan)	32	(18)
2011–2014	Trabzonspor	84	(19)
2014–2017	Shanghai Shenhua	24	(12)
2015	→ Liaoning Whowin (loan)	5	(1)
2016	→ Estoril (loan)	2	(0)
2017	→ Sport Recife (loan)	0	(0)
2017–2018	Akhisar Belediyespor	23	(6)
Total		243	(77)
- * Club domestic league appearances and goals

Paulo Henrique Carneiro Filho (born 13 March 1989), known simply as Paulo Henrique, is a Brazilian retired professional footballer who played as a forward.

== Career ==
Paulo Henrique made his professional debut and scored his first professional goal for Atlético Mineiro in a 1–0 away win against São Paulo in the Campeonato Brasileiro on 10 June 2007. On 21 August 2007, Paulo Henrique signed a 3+2-year deal with SC Heerenveen, in the Eredivisie. He scored on his debut for SC Heerenveen, scoring two goals in the 5–1 away victory at NAC Breda on 15 December 2007. In February 2009 he scored the first two Heerenveen goals in a 3–2 win at PSV Eindhoven. He was released by Heerenveen at the end of March 2010 because of conflict on terms to re-new his contract.

Paulo Henrique was immediately signed by third-party owner Traffic Group in a four-year contract, via a proxy subsidiary club Desportivo Brasil. He then joined Brazilian Série A club Palmeiras in a temporary deal until 31 December 2011. In August 2010 he returned to Europe for Belgian side Westerlo in another loan.

Paulo Henrique signed for Turkish club Trabzonspor from Desportivo Brasil in July 2011 for a €4 million transfer fee. He signed a four-year contract worth an average of €900,000 a season.

On 2 July 2014, Paulo Henrique transferred to Chinese Super League side Shanghai Greenland Shenhua for €4 million transfer fee. On 16 July 2015, Henrique was loaned to fellow Chinese Super League side Liaoning Whowin until 31 December 2015. On 15 July 2016, Henrique was loaned to Primeira Liga club Estoril. On 20 January 2017, he was loaned to Sport Recife.

On 21 July 2017, Paulo Henrique returned to Turkey and joined another Süper Lig side Akhisar Belediyespor on free transfer. On 10 May 2018, Henrique helped Akhisar Belediyespor win their first professional trophy, the 2017–18 Turkish Cup.

== Career statistics ==
Appearances and goals by club, season and competition
Club	Season	League			Cup		Continental		Other		Total	
Club	Season	Division	Apps	Goals	Apps	Goals	Apps	Goals	Apps	Goal	Apps	Goalss
Atlético Mineiro	2007	Série A	13	3	0	0	—		—		13	3
Heerenveen	2007–08	Eredivisie	13	5	0	0	0	0	—		13	5
Heerenveen	2008–09	Eredivisie	26	10	3	2	6 (Note: Appearances in UEFA Europa League)	1	—		35	13
Heerenveen	2009–10	Eredivisie	16	3	1	0	7 (Note: Appearances in UEFA Europa League)	1	1 (Note: Appearance in Johan Cruyff Shield)	0	25	4
Heerenveen	Total		55	18	4	2	13	2	1	0	73	22
Palmeiras (loan)	2010	Série A	5	0	2	0	—		0	0	7	0
Westerlo (loan)	2010–11	Belgian Pro League	32	18	7	4	—		—		39	22
Trabzonspor	2011–12	Süper Lig	32	2	2	0	10 (Note: Seven appearances in UEFA Champions League, Three appearances in UEFA Europa League)	1	—		44	3
Trabzonspor	2012–13	Süper Lig	20	4	7	1	1	0	—		28	5
Trabzonspor	2013–14	Süper Lig	32	13	1	0	13	8	—		46	21
Trabzonspor	Total		84	19	10	1	24	9	—		118	29
Shanghai Shenhua	2014	Chinese Super League	13	6	0	0	—		—		13	6
Shanghai Shenhua	2015	Chinese Super League	11	6	0	0	—		—		11	6
Shanghai Shenhua	Total		24	12	0	0	—		—		24	12
Liaoning Kaixin (loan)	2015	Chinese Super League	5	1	0	0	—		—		5	1
Estoril (loan)	2016–17	Primeira Liga	2	0	0	0	—		1 (Note: Appearances in Taça da Liga)	0	3	0
Sport Recife (loan)	2017	Série A	0	0	2	0	1 (Note: Appearances in Copa Sudamericana)	0	9 (Note: Six appearances in Campeonato Pernambucano, Two appearances in Copa do Nordeste)	2	11	2
Akhisarspor	2017–18	Süper Lig	23	6	3	0	—		—		26	6
Career total			243	77	28	7	38	11	11	2	319	97

== Honours ==
Heerenven

- KNVB Cup: 2008-09

Akhisarspor

- Turkish Cup: 2017-18
