= Sergio Zijler =

Dutch footballer (born 1987)

Personal information
- Full name: Marcel Sergio Orpheo Zijler
- Date of birth: 8 July 1987 (age 39)
- Place of birth: Rotterdam, Netherlands
- Height: 1.65 m (5 ft 5 in)
- Positions: Attacking midfielder; winger

Youth career
- ASV Fortius
- 1997–2006: Ajax

Senior career*
| Years | Team | Apps | (Gls) |
| 2006–2008 | Twente | 13 | (2) |
| 2008–2010 | Willem II | 65 | (6) |
| 2011 | Rijeka | 4 | (0) |
| 2011 | Orduspor | 0 | (0) |
| 2014 | Zelina | 14 | (0) |
| 2014–2015 | Achilles '29 | 10 | (0) |
| 2015 | Universitatea Cluj | 2 | (0) |
| 2015 | Lienden | 3 | (0) |
| Total | | 111 | (8) |

International career
| 2002 | Netherlands U16 | 4 | (0) |
| 2003–2004 | Netherlands U17 | 7 | (1) |
- * Club domestic league appearances and goals

Marcel Sergio Orpheo Zijler (born 8 July 1987) is a Dutch former professional footballer who played as a winger.

Zijler, born in Rotterdam, began his football journey at the Ajax academy before making his professional debut with Twente in 2006. He later joined Willem II, becoming a regular starter in the Eredivisie. Zijler's career also saw him competing abroad, with stints at clubs like Rijeka in Croatia, Orduspor in Turkey, and Universitatea Cluj in Romania. His later years included experiences in lower-tier leagues.

A youth international for the Netherlands, Zijler gained caps for the Netherlands under-16 and under-17 teams.

== Club career ==
Born in Rotterdam, Zijler spent part of his youth training at Ajax's academy. In 2006, he moved to Twente, where he made his professional debut on 21 October 2006, as a substitute for Otman Bakkal in an Eredivisie match against Excelsior. On 12 November 2006, he marked his first start for the senior team by scoring twice in a 7–1 victory over Groningen. During the 2007–08 season, Zijler made only one Eredivisie appearance.

On 2 January 2008, he accepted an offer from Willem II, a move that Twente coach Fred Rutten described as "beneficial for his development". Zijler signed a two-and-a-half-year contract with Willem II. While he initially made limited appearances as a substitute during his first half-season, he became a regular starter over the following two seasons. His contract expired at the end of the 2009–10 season.

After becoming a free agent, Zijler had trial periods with Metz, Polonia Warsaw, and FC Zwolle that did not result in contracts. In January 2011, he signed a one-and-a-half-year deal with Rijeka. From June 2011 to January 2012, he played for Orduspor in Turkey before spending about a year without a club. He then joined Croatian second-tier club Zelina. In September 2014, after a trial, Zijler signed with Achilles '29 on an amateur basis.

In January 2015, he signed a short-term contract with Romanian club Universitatea Cluj following a successful trial. In March 2015, Zijler faced controversy when a photo surfaced of him in a betting shop. The club suspended him, alleging illegal gambling. Zijler denied the claims, stating he had only visited a convenience store in the same building and viewed live football screens and betting lists, while also highlighting unpaid wages. In July 2015, the Romanian Football Federation's appeals committee ruled that Universitatea Cluj must meet its contractual obligations to him.

In September 2015, Zijler joined Lienden in the Topklasse Sunday but parted ways with the club in December 2015. Due to lateness to practice, he made only three appearances and fell out of favour with head coach Hans van de Haar.

== International career ==
Zijler was part of the Netherlands U-17 team in 2003.

In 2009, he played for the combination team of the Suriname national football team and the 'Suriprofs' (Surinamese professional players in the Netherlands) at the Parbo Bier Cup tournament.

== Career statistics ==
Appearances and goals by club, season and competition
| Club | Season | League | | | National cup | | Other | | Total | |
| Club | Season | Division | Apps | Goals | Apps | Goals | Apps | Goals | Apps | Goals |
|---|---|---|---|---|---|---|---|---|---|---|
| Twente | 2006–07 | Eredivisie | 12 | 2 | 1 | 0 | 2 (Note: Appearances in Eredivisie European play-offs) | 0 | 15 | 1 |
| Twente | 2007–08 | Eredivisie | 1 | 0 | 1 | 0 | 0 | 0 | 2 | 0 |
| Twente | Total | | 13 | 2 | 2 | 0 | 2 | 0 | 17 | 2 |
| Willem II | 2007–08 | Eredivisie | 5 | 0 | — | | — | | 5 | 0 |
| Willem II | 2008–09 | Eredivisie | 29 | 2 | 2 | 0 | — | | 31 | 2 |
| Willem II | 2009–10 | Eredivisie | 31 | 4 | 1 | 0 | 3 (Note: Appearances in Eredivisie relegation play-offs) | 0 | 35 | 4 |
| Willem II | Total | | 65 | 6 | 3 | 0 | 3 | 0 | 71 | 6 |
| Rijeka | 2010–11 | Prva HNL | 4 | 0 | 0 | 0 | — | | 4 | 0 |
| Orduspor | 2011–12 | Süper Lig | 0 | 0 | 0 | 0 | — | | 0 | 0 |
| Zelina | 2013–14 | Prva NL | 14 | 0 | 0 | 0 | — | | 14 | 0 |
| Achilles '29 | 2014–15 | Eerste Divisie | 10 | 0 | 0 | 0 | — | | 10 | 0 |
| Universitatea Cluj | 2014–15 | Liga I | 2 | 0 | 0 | 0 | — | | 2 | 0 |
| Lienden | 2015–16 | Topklasse | 3 | 0 | 1 | 0 | — | | 4 | 0 |
| Career total | | | 111 | 8 | 6 | 0 | 5 | 0 | 122 | 8 |
