= Stijn Schaars =

Dutch footballer (born 1984)

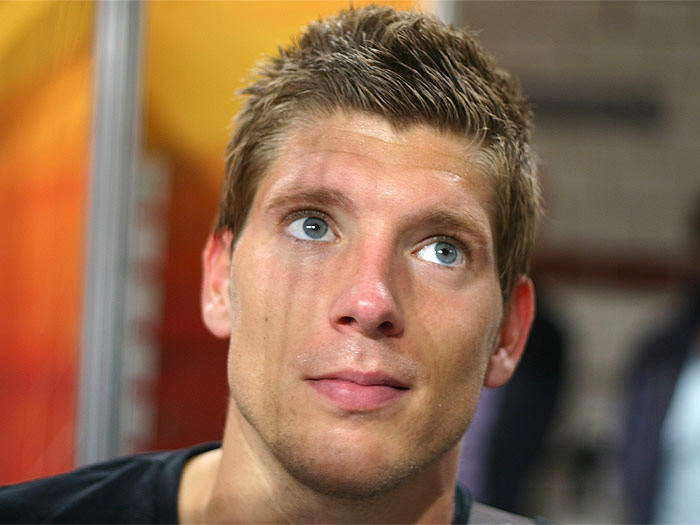
- Schaars in 2009

Personal information
- Full name: Stephanus Johannes Schaars
- Date of birth: 11 January 1984 (age 42)
- Place of birth: Gendt, Netherlands
- Height: 1.82 m (6 ft 0 in)
- Position: Midfielder

Team information
- Current team: Jong PSV (manager)

Youth career
- VV De Bataven
- 2000–2003: Vitesse

Senior career*
Years	Team	Apps	(Gls)
2003–2005	Vitesse	44	(4)
2005–2011	AZ	129	(7)
2011–2013	Sporting CP	37	(3)
2013–2016	PSV	41	(0)
2014–2016	Jong PSV	6	(1)
2016–2019	Heerenveen	58	(4)
Total		315	(19)

International career
2003–2006	Netherlands U21	20	(1)
2006–2016	Netherlands	24	(0)

Managerial career
- 2020–2021: PSV (U17 assistant)
- 2021–2022: PSV (U18 assistant)
- 2021–2022: Netherlands U21 (assistant)
- 2022–2023: PSV (youth)
- 2023–2025: PSV (assistant)
- 2025–: Jong PSV
Medal record
Men's football
Representing Netherlands
FIFA World Cup
Runner-up	2010
UEFA European Under-21 Championship
Winner	2006
- * Club domestic league appearances and goals

Stephanus Johannes "Stijn" Schaars (Dutch pronunciation: [stɛin ˈsxaːrs]; born 11 January 1984) is a Dutch professional football coach and a former midfielder who is the manager of Eerste Divisie club Jong PSV.

== Club career ==
=== Vitesse ===
Born in Gendt, Gelderland, Schaars was first discovered by Dutch coach Theo Bos, who went on to manage Schaars' U13 Vitesse youth team.

Following successful development in Vitesse's youth team, he was promoted to the main squad for the final few games of the 2002–03 Eredivisie. He made his debut for the club on 9 March 2003 in a 4–1 away defeat to FC Utrecht. The following season he became a regular in Vitesse's side at the age of 19. In his first full season he played 21 league games. In the 2004–05 Eredivisie, he helped his club reach a credible seventh place in the league contributing four goals in 21 appearances.

=== AZ ===
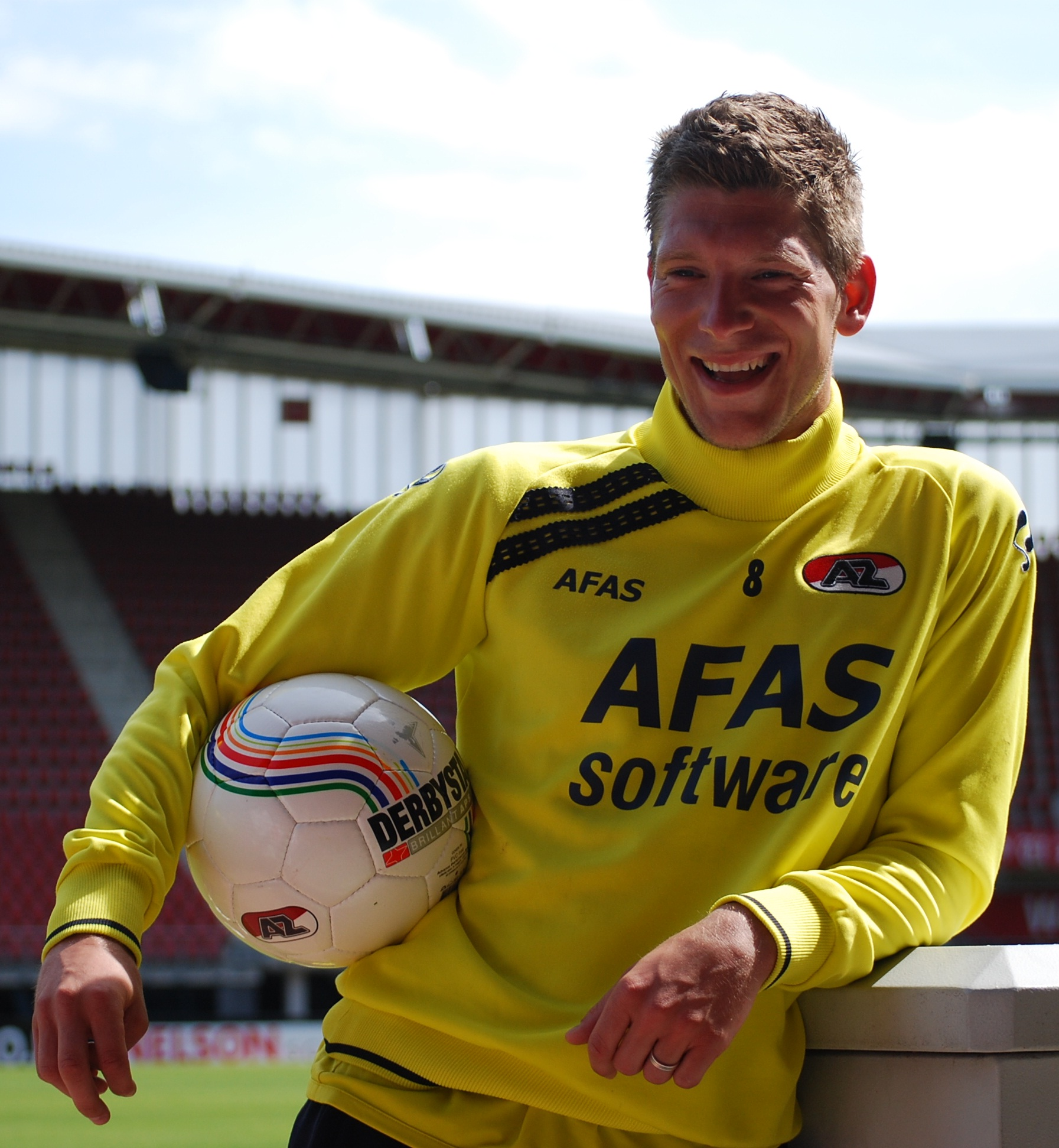
Schaars with AZ in 2011

In the summer of 2005, he was signed by AZ. In his first full season at AZ, he suffered a serious hip injury at the beginning of the 2005–06 Eredivisie season which kept him out for several months. He returned in February 2006 against FC Utrecht in a 2–3 defeat. In the next season he missed most of it due to sustaining a number of serious injuries which also kept him out for the 2007–08 Eredivisie season.

His return came in the 2008–09 Eredivisie season, where he played a pivotal role in midfield along with David Mendes da Silva, Demy de Zeeuw and Maarten Martens to claim AZ's second league title in their history. Following the capture of the league title, he helped AZ claim their very first Johan Cruijff Shield in the 2009 edition of the tournament where AZ defeated Heerenveen. In the 2009–10 season he was named team captain of the side in which he held that position until the end of 2010–11 Eredivisie where he left the club in the summer after six seasons to join Sporting Lisbon of Portugal. During his time with AZ, the Dutch media frequently compared him to English midfielder Steven Gerrard due to his strong presence in midfield, his vision and his technical ability.

=== Sporting CP ===
Schaars signed for the Portuguese side Sporting CP on 16 June 2011 on a transfer worth 850,000 euros. He was one of many new players bought by Luís Godinho Lopes under the management of Domingos Paciência who also bought other foreign players like Alberto Rodríguez, André Carrillo, Elias Trindade, Fabián Rinaudo, Oguchi Onyewu and Ricky van Wolfswinkel.

Under the management of Domingos Paciência and later on in the season Ricardo Sá Pinto he was a regular in Sporting's season. He scored his first goal for the club in a 3–2 away win against Rio Ave. The following matchday, Schaars scored his first goal at Estádio José de Alvalade. He opened the scoresheet in Sporting's 3–0 home win against Vitória de Setúbal. Following excellent displays during his first few months with Sporting, he attracted interest from several big European clubs of which included Barcelona and Olympique de Marseille. Despite Sporting having a disappointing domestic club finish where they finished behind FC Porto, Benfica and Braga in the 2011–12 Primeira Liga, Schaars played a pivotal role in Sporting's cup competitions. He helped Sporting reach the 2011–12 UEFA Europa League semi final stage where they lost to Athletic Bilbao, 4–3 on aggregate. Schaars was also part of the side that reached the 2012 Taça de Portugal Final where they lost to Académica de Coimbra, 1–0. Following the 2011–12 season, he was linked with a move to Premier League side Fulham.

Following the start of the 2012–13 Primeira Liga, he suffered an injury, for which he received surgery, which led him to miss several league, cup and European games. Schaars returned in Sporting's European away game to Videoton FC on 4 October 2012.

=== PSV ===
On 13 July 2013, it was announced that Schaars returned to the Eredivisie by making a transfer to PSV. PSV paid €1.6 million for both Schaars and his teammate Santiago Arias.

=== Heerenveen ===
After his contract was not renewed at PSV, Schaars joined Heerenveen in July 2016.

== International career ==
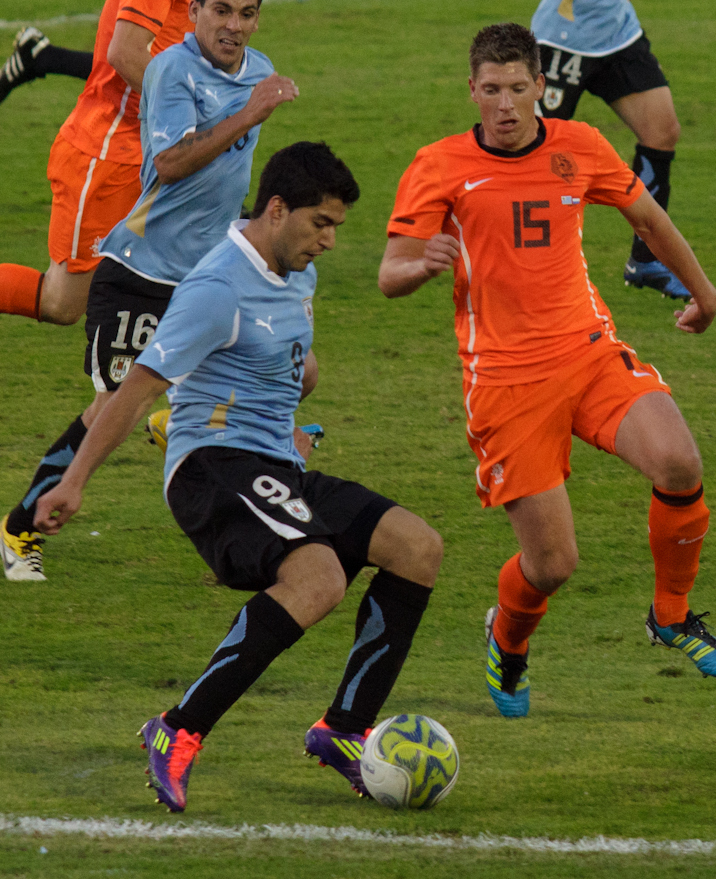
Schaars (right) playing for the Netherlands in 2011

His debut for the national team came on 16 August 2006, as he started in a friendly versus Republic of Ireland which the Netherlands won 4–0. Earlier that year he was the captain of the Dutch side that won the UEFA U-21 Championship 2006.

An ankle injury prevented Schaars from taking part in most of the 2006–07 season and he didn't play a single Eredivisie game during the following season. This effectively ruled out his chances of taking part in EURO 2008 with the Netherlands. Schaars was included in the preliminary squad for the 2010 FIFA World Cup in South Africa. On 27 May 2010, Netherlands manager Bert van Marwijk announced that the player would be part of the final squad of 23 participating in the competition.

Following frequent call ups to the Dutch side's qualification campaign to participate at UEFA Euro 2012, he was selected by manager by Van Marwijk to participate in the tournament finals. At Euro 2012, he did not participate in any of the group stage matches where his nation finished bottom of the group following three defeats to Denmark, Germany and Portugal.

== Coaching career ==
After working with different PSV Eindhoven youth sides, on 30 June 2025 Schaars was appointed manager of their reserve team Jong PSV that plays in the second-tier Eerste Divisie.

== Career statistics ==
=== Club ===
Appearances and goals by club, season and competition
Club	Season	League			Cup		Continental		Other		Total	
Club	Season	Division	Apps	Goals	Apps	Goals	Apps	Goals	Apps	Goals	Apps	Goals
Vitesse	2002–03	Eredivisie	2	0	1	0	0	0	–		3	0
Vitesse	2003–04	Eredivisie	21	0	1	0	–		3	1	25	1
Vitesse	2004–05	Eredivisie	21	4	0	0	–		–		21	4
Vitesse	Total		44	4	2	0	0	0	3	1	49	5
AZ	2005–06	Eredivisie	24	1	1	0	6	0	2	0	33	1
AZ	2006–07	Eredivisie	18	5	2	3	7	1	0	0	27	9
AZ	2007–08	Eredivisie	0	0	0	0	0	0	–		0	0
AZ	2008–09	Eredivisie	29	0	4	0	–		–		33	0
AZ	2009–10	Eredivisie	29	0	3	1	6	0	1	0	39	1
AZ	2010–11	Eredivisie	29	1	2	0	8	0	–		39	1
AZ	Total		129	7	12	4	27	1	3	0	171	12
Sporting CP	2011–12	Primeira Liga	26	3	8	2	16	0	–		50	5
Sporting CP	2012–13	Primeira Liga	11	0	1	1	4	0	–		16	1
Sporting CP	Total		37	3	9	3	20	0	0	0	66	6
PSV	2013–14	Eredivisie	27	0	2	0	9	0	–		38	0
PSV	2014–15	Eredivisie	2	0	0	0	0	0	–		2	0
PSV	2015–16	Eredivisie	12	0	2	0	1	0	0	0	15	0
PSV	Total		41	0	4	0	10	0	0	0	55	0
Jong PSV	2014–15	Eerste Divisie	6	1	–						6	1
Heerenveen	2016–17	Eredivisie	20	1	2	1	0	0	2	0	24	2
Heerenveen	2017–18	Eredivisie	29	3	0	0	0	0	0	0	29	3
Heerenveen	2018–19	Eredivisie	9	0	1	0	0	0	0	0	10	0
Heerenveen	Total		58	4	3	1	0	0	2	0	63	5
Career total			315	19	30	8	57	1	8	1	410	29

=== International ===
Appearances and goals by national team and year
National team	Year	Apps	Goals
Netherlands	2006	6	0
Netherlands	2009	5	0
Netherlands	2010	2	0
Netherlands	2011	2	0
Netherlands	2012	4	0
Netherlands	2013	3	0
Netherlands	2014	1	0
Netherlands	2016	1	0
Total		24	0

== Honours ==
AZ

- Eredivisie: 2008–09
- Johan Cruyff Shield: 2009

PSV

- Eredivisie: 2014–15, 2015–16
- Johan Cruyff Shield: 2015

Netherlands U21

- UEFA European Under-21 Championship: 2006
