= Michal Papadopulos =

Czech footballer (born 1985)

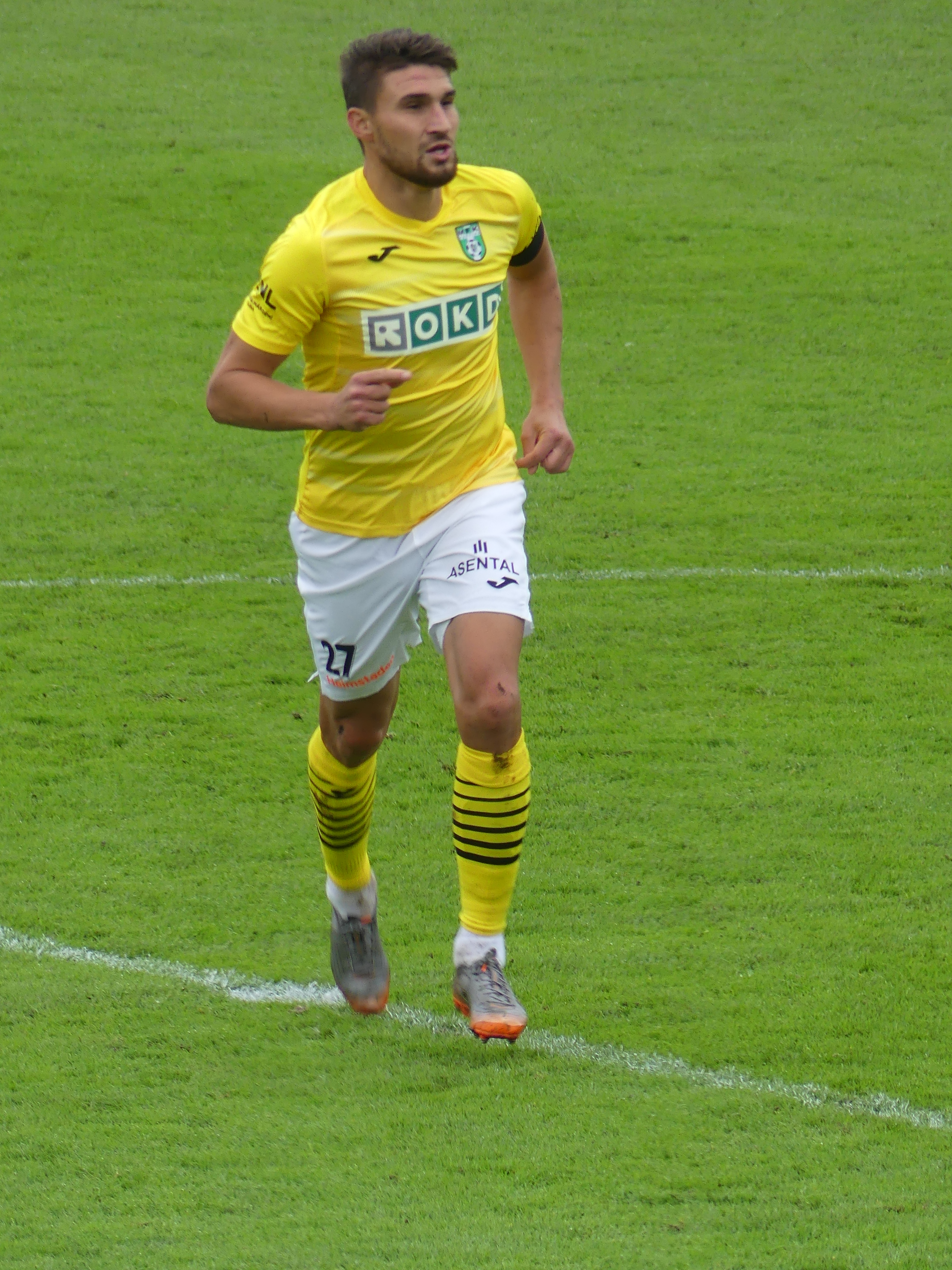
- Papadopulos playing for MFK Karviná in 2022

Personal information
- Date of birth: 14 April 1985 (age 41)
- Place of birth: Ostrava, Czechoslovakia
- Height: 1.83 m (6 ft 0 in)
- Position: Forward

Team information
- Current team: Baník Ostrava (assistant)

Youth career
- 1992–1998: NH Ostrava
- 1998–2002: Baník Ostrava

Senior career*
Years	Team	Apps	(Gls)
2002–2005	Baník Ostrava	51	(9)
2003–2004	→ Arsenal (loan)	0	(0)
2006–2008	Bayer Leverkusen	19	(0)
2008	→ Energie Cottbus (loan)	14	(2)
2008–2009	Mladá Boleslav	29	(10)
2009–2011	Heerenveen	27	(7)
2011	Zhemchuzhina	14	(5)
2011–2012	FC Rostov	9	(1)
2012–2017	Zagłębie Lubin	125	(30)
2017–2019	Piast Gliwice	78	(16)
2019–2020	Korona Kielce	27	(3)
2020–2023	MFK Karviná	84	(15)
Total		477	(98)

International career
2000–2001	Czech Republic U15	6	(1)
2001–2002	Czech Republic U17	18	(7)
2002–2004	Czech Republic U19	16	(5)
2004–2007	Czech Republic U21	27	(4)
2008–2011	Czech Republic	6	(0)
- * Club domestic league appearances and goals

Michal Papadopulos (born 14 April 1985) is a Czech former professional footballer who played as a forward. He is currently the assistant coach of Czech First League club Baník Ostrava.

== Career ==
Papadopulos started his football career in his native Ostrava at NH Ostrava, and then Baník Ostrava. He moved early to English club Arsenal in July 2003. He played one first-team match for Arsenal, in a December 2003 League Cup match against Wolverhampton Wanderers as a 83rd-minute substitute for Jérémie Aliadière. He returned to Baník in 2004. Papadopulos won the Czech Cup with Baník in 2005. In December 2005, he moved to German club Bayer Leverkusen, spending some time on loan at side Energie Cottbus before signing with Czech side Mladá Boleslav in June 2008. In June 2009, SC Heerenveen signed the Czech forward from Mladá Boleslav on a five-year contract.

== Personal life ==
Papadopulos is of Greek and Czech descent.

== Honours ==
Baník Ostrava

- Czech Cup: 2004–05

Zagłębie Lubin

- I liga: 2014–15

Piast Gliwice

- Ekstraklasa: 2018–19

MFK Karviná

- Czech National Football League: 2022–23
