= Michel Breuer =

Dutch footballer

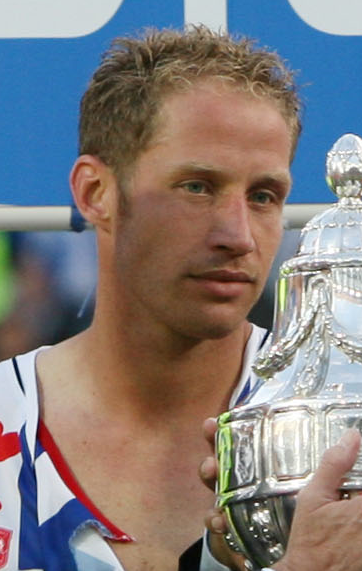
- Breuer being presented with the KNVB trophy in 2009

Personal information
- Date of birth: 25 May 1980 (age 46)
- Place of birth: Gouda, Netherlands
- Height: 1.83 m (6 ft 0 in)
- Position: Centre back

Team information
- Current team: Excelsior (asst. manager)

Youth career
- Haastrecht
- Olympia

Senior career*
Years	Team	Apps	(Gls)
1998–2004	Excelsior	108	(10)
2004–2012	Heerenveen	236	(10)
2012–2014	NEC	36	(1)
2014	→ Sparta (loan)	16	(0)
2014–2018	Sparta	109	(8)
Total		505	(29)

Managerial career
- 2018-2022: Sparta (academy)
- 2022–2023: De Graafschap (asst.)
- 2023–: Excelsior (asst.)
- * Club domestic league appearances and goals as of 23 May 2018

Michel Breuer (Dutch pronunciation: [miˈɕɛl ˈbrøːjər]; born 25 May 1980) is a retired Dutch footballer who, during his career, played in his home country for Excelsior, SC Heerenveen, NEC Nijmegen and Sparta Rotterdam. His father, Martin Breuer, played professionally for FC Dordrecht and FC Den Bosch in the 1970s and 80s.

== Club career ==
=== Youth career ===
Michel Breuer started to play football at his local football club in Haastrecht, at the age of 11. He moved to GCFC Olympia where he stayed for a year before joined the Youth academy of Rotterdam side Excelsior.

=== SBV Excelsior ===
Breuer played his professional game for Excelsior on 3 May 1999, against FC Dordrecht in a 2-1 loss. Following this, Breuer broke into the first team squad week after week. He made over 100 league appearances for Excelsior.

=== SC Heerenveen ===
Breuer had previously worked at a local secondary school in Heerenveen as a security guard. In summer 2004 he moved to SC Heerenveen. He became captain of the Heerenveen team at the start of the 2008–09 Eredivisie season. In July 2012 Breuer left Heerenveen after eight years and 300 matches in all competitions and signed with NEC from Nijmegen.

=== NEC Nijmegen ===
However, the defender played less than 40 games over the course of two years and he signed on loan for Sparta Rotterdam in 2014.

=== Sparta Rotterdam ===
After his contract had expired with NEC in June 2014, he signed a permanent deal to return to Rotterdam for a third time. His no-nonsense, wholehearted playing style won him a cult-hero status with their supporters. This meant he earned himself the captaincy and after one promotion, a cup win and over 550 games in all competitions, Breuer retired from the professional game. However, it was slightly overshadowed by the fact Sparta were relegated back to the Eerste Divisie via the playoffs.

After retiring as a player, Breuer joined Sparta's yuuth teams set-up and later worked as an assistant to Adrie Poldervaart at De Graafschap. He joined Excelsior as an assistant in summer 2023.

== Honours ==
=== Club ===
SC Heerenveen

- KNVB Cup: 2009

Sparta Rotterdam

- Eerste Divisie: 2015-16
