= Maarten Martens =

Belgian footballer (born 1984)

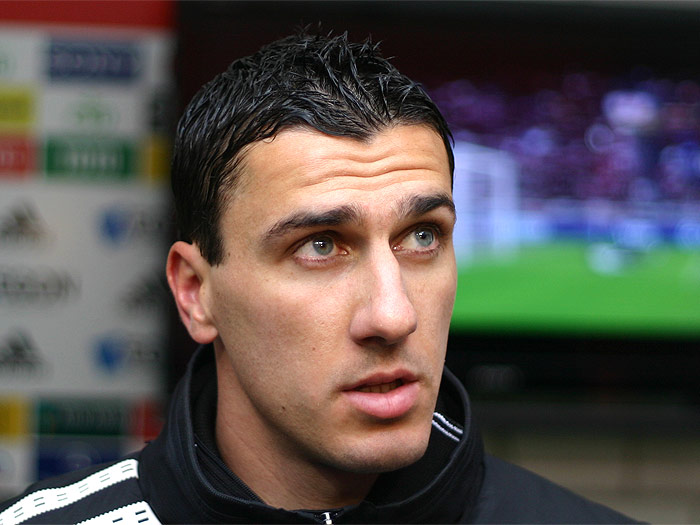
- Martens in 2010

Personal information
- Date of birth: 2 July 1984 (age 42)
- Place of birth: Eeklo, Belgium
- Height: 1.76 m (5 ft 9 in)
- Position: Attacking midfielder

Youth career
- 1999–2000: Klauwaerts Bassevelde
- 2000–2003: Anderlecht

Senior career*
Years	Team	Apps	(Gls)
2003–2005	Anderlecht	1	(0)
2004–2005	→ RKC Waalwijk (loan)	23	(2)
2005–2006	RKC Waalwijk	22	(6)
2006–2014	AZ	164	(34)
2014–2015	PAOK	13	(0)
2015	→ Cercle Brugge (loan)	8	(0)
Total		231	(42)

International career
2000	Belgium U16	6	(1)
2000	Belgium U17	3	(0)
2001–2002	Belgium U18	7	(0)
2002–2003	Belgium U19	14	(1)
2003	Belgium U20	1	(0)
2003–2007	Belgium U21	28	(7)
2007–2010	Belgium	9	(0)

Managerial career
- 2016–2021: Club Brugge (youth)
- 2021–2023: Jong AZ
- 2023–2024: AZ Alkmaar (assistant)
- 2024–2026: AZ Alkmaar
- * Club domestic league appearances and goals

Maarten Martens (Dutch pronunciation: [ˈmaːrtə(n) ˈmaːrtəns]; born 2 July 1984) is a Belgian professional football coach and a former player who played as a midfielder, either as an attacking midfielder or winger who was most recently the head coach of the Dutch club AZ Alkmaar. Martens was known for his flair, dribbling and goalscoring ability as well as his precise passing and creativity. He previously played for Belgian clubs Anderlecht and Cercle Brugge, Dutch clubs RKC Waalwijk and AZ, as well as Greek club PAOK. At international level, he has represented the Belgium national team.

== Early career ==
Born in Eeklo, Maarten Martens took his first steps in football in Klauwaerts Bassevelde. At the age of eight young Martens joined the youth team of Anderlecht. There, over the years he was a teammate of, among others, Urko Pardo, Mark De Man and Xavier Chen. In 2003 Roda showed interest in the young midfielder, but he decided to stay in the team of his heart. In the 2003–04 season, Martens joined the first team, but he did not have many chances to prove himself. Only once under the coach Hugo Broos did he play at the highest level.

== Club career ==
=== RKC Waalwijk ===
Martens' improvement made Anderlecht loan him to another club. Over a year RKC Waalwijk wanted the 20-year-old midfielder so it signed on a year loan. Martens, both as a midfield and winger, improves tremendously in his first season. In the summer of 2005 the club bought him from Anderlecht for a three-year contract. Football journalist Johan Derksen said at that time in one of its VI -columns that Martens is a fantastic footballer and will enjoy playing for Waalwijk.

=== AZ ===
In the summer of 2006, Martens moved like his compatriot Mousa Dembélé from AZ. It was Louis van Gaal who noticed the young talents. Martens improved even further under Van Gaal instructions. With AZ he had a key role to the struggle for the league title.

On 28 October 2007, Martens had his first injury. This severe injury kept him outside for a long time. Only in the 2008/09 season did Martens go back into the first team. He played almost every match in that season and attracted the attention of the Italian giants Juventus. But the Belgian midfielder remained in the Netherlands and won the championship with AZ. A year later, Martens made his first appearance in the UEFA Champions League.

In April 2011, Martens was the victim of a charge from his compatriot and former teammate Gill Swerts. On his return in August 2011, Martens immediately scored an important goal in the match against PSV. Two weeks later, Martens was injured again. Only in December 2011, he succeeded to come back in the first team.

In August 2012, after the departure of Niklas Moisander and Rasmus Elm, Martens became the captain of the club. Martens played the first few games of the season, but after a serious knee injury missed the rest of the season.

=== PAOK ===
On 15 January 2014, Martens signed a contract with Super League Greece team PAOK until 30 June 2016. After a year with PAOK, Maartens signed on loan with Belgian club Cercle Brugge for the rest of the 2014–15 season, but after the relegation of the club, he returned to PAOK. On 5 August 2015, Martens reached an agreement with PAOK to terminate his contract with the club.

== International career ==
While Martens played for RKC, he earned the interest of Jean-François De Sart. He became the captain of the Belgium U21 team.

Over the years, the young midfielder was part of a strong generation of players like Vincent Kompany, Marouane Fellaini, Jan Vertonghen, Thomas Vermaelen and Mousa Dembélé. He was selected for the U-21 European Championships in 2007. The young Belgians reached the semi-finals and qualified for the Olympic Games in 2008.

At the Olympics, Belgium promoted from Group C along with Brazil through to the quarterfinals. Belgium surprisingly won Italy to the quarterfinals by 3–2. In the semi-final against Nigeria, Belgium lost 4–1. In the game for the bronze medal Brazil defeated the young Red Devils 3–0.

The good performance of the young Devils stood in contrast to the poor results of the first team. Many players, among Martens, from this team after the Olympic Games were promoted to the first team, but Martens throughout the years did not manage to receive a permanent call. But he is, to date, the player with the most appearances in the Belgium U21 team.

Martens made his debut on 7 February 2007 with Belgium. It was coach Rene Vandereycken who selected him for the first time. After his debut, Martens was barely called for the national team following several injuries. In 2009, Frank Vercauteren, called him for the Kirin Cup in Japan. In 2010, under Dick Advocaat, he appeared in his last international match, replacing Wesley Sonck.

== Managerial career ==
In May 2021, Martens started his first job as head coach in Alkmaar, with Jong AZ, after he already worked in the youth of Club Brugge as an assistant coach.

At the end of the 2022–23 season, he was moved from Jong AZ to the main AZ squad as an assistant coach.

In January 2024, Martens became the head coach of AZ Alkmaar, his first senior coaching job, taking over following the dismissal of Pascal Jensen. Martens was initially given the role until the end of the season, but after guiding AZ to a fourth-place finish in the Eredivisie he signed a two-year contract extension. On 9 May 2025, it was announced that Martens, along with his entire technical staff, had signed a new three-year contract with AZ. On 18 January 2026, Martens was sacked due to disappointing results.

== Career statistics ==
=== Club ===
Appearances and goals by club, season and competition
Club	Season	League			Cup		Europe		Other		Total	
Club	Season	Division	Apps	Goals	Apps	Goals	Apps	Goals	Apps	Goals	Apps	Goals
Anderlecht	2003–04	Pro League	1	0	0	0	0	0	0	0	1	0
RKC Waalwijk	2004–05	Eredivisie	23	2	4	0	—		0	0	27	2
RKC Waalwijk	2005–06	Eredivisie	22	6	3	1	—		0	0	25	7
RKC Waalwijk	Total		45	8	7	1	0		0	0	52	9
AZ	2006–07	Eredivisie	31	10	1	0	10	2	4 (Note: Four appearances in Eredivisie playoffs)	0	46	12
AZ	2007–08	Eredivisie	7	0	1	0	3	0	0	0	11	0
AZ	2008–09	Eredivisie	32	7	3	0	—		0	0	35	7
AZ	2009–10	Eredivisie	31	5	1	0	6	0	1 (Note: One appearance and one goal in Johan Cruyff Shield)	1	39	6
AZ	2010–11	Eredivisie	24	6	2	0	9	0	0	0	35	6
AZ	2011–12	Eredivisie	15	4	3	3	9	5	0	0	27	12
AZ	2012–13	Eredivisie	6	1	1	0	2	0	0	0	9	1
AZ	2013–14	Eredivisie	17	1	2	0	6	0	1 (Note: One appearance in Johan Cruyff Shield)	0	26	1
AZ	Total		164	34	11	3	45	7	6	1	226	45
PAOK	2013–14	Super League Greece	5	0	2	1	0	0	2 (Note: Two appearances in Super League Greece play-offs)	0	9	1
PAOK	2014–15	Super League Greece	8	0	2	0	5	2	0	0	15	2
PAOK	Total		13	0	4	1	5	2	2	0	24	3
Cercle Brugge	2014–15	Pro League	8	0	0	0	0	0	3 (Note: Three appearances and one goal in Pro League playoffs)	1	11	1
Career total			231	42	22	5	50	9	11	2	314	58

=== Managerial statistics ===
As of 17 January 2026

Managerial record by team and tenure
Team	From	Until	Record							
Team	From	Until	P	W	D	L	GF	GA	GD	Win %
Jong AZ	1 July 2021	30 June 2023	76	26	15	35	130	142	−12	34.21
AZ	17 January 2024	18 January 2026	103	54	22	27	198	136	+62	52.43
Total			179	80	37	62	328	278	+50	44.69

== Honours ==
AZ

- Eredivisie: 2008–09
- KNVB Cup: 2012–13
- Johan Cruijff Shield: 2009

Individual

- Eredivisie Manager of the Month: October 2025
