= Gill Swerts =

Belgian footballer (born 1982)

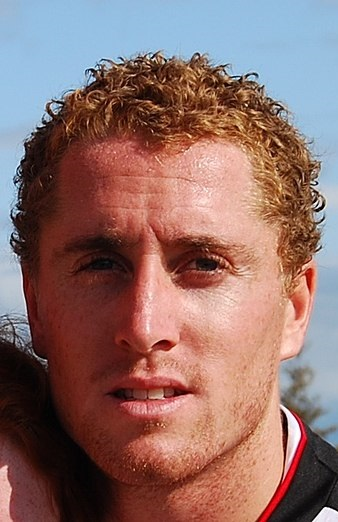
- Swerts with AZ in 2009

Personal information
- Full name: Gill Toby Todor Swerts
- Date of birth: 23 September 1982 (age 44)
- Place of birth: Brasschaat, Belgium
- Height: 1.79 m (5 ft 10 in)
- Positions: Right-back; right midfielder

Team information
- Current team: Belgium U21 (manager)

Youth career
- Schilde
- –1999: Beveren
- 1999–2001: Feyenoord

Senior career*
Years	Team	Apps	(Gls)
2001–2005	Feyenoord	17	(0)
2001–2002	→ Excelsior (loan)	30	(6)
2002–2003	→ Excelsior (loan)	33	(1)
2004–2005	→ ADO Den Haag (loan)	33	(1)
2005–2008	Vitesse	66	(5)
2008–2011	AZ	46	(2)
2011–2012	Feyenoord	10	(1)
2012–2013	SønderjyskE	11	(0)
2013–2015	NAC Breda	31	(0)
2015–2016	Notts County	12	(0)
2016–2017	RFC Seraing	20	(0)
2018–2019	KFC Lille	20	(0)
Total		329	(16)

International career
1996	Belgium U15	1	(0)
1997–1998	Belgium U16	9	(1)
1998–1999	Belgium U17	3	(1)
2001	Belgium U18	4	(0)
2002–2003	Belgium U21	7	(0)
2006–2009	Belgium	17	(1)

Managerial career
- 2023–: Belgium U21
- * Club domestic league appearances and goals

Gill Toby Todor Swerts (born 23 September 1982) is a Belgian football manager and former professional footballer who played as a right-back. He is currently the manager of Belgium U21.

== Career ==
Swerts was born in Brasschaat, Belgium and made his debut in professional football as part of the Excelsior squad in the 2001–02 season. He also played for Feyenoord, ADO Den Haag, Vitesse and AZ before returning to Feyenoord in January 2011. He was part of the AZ team winning the 2008–09 Eredivisie. After that, he played for SønderjyskE in Denmark, NAC Breda, and Notts County in England.

In early 2016, his contract with Notts County was terminated by mutual consent due to a lack of playing time. In October 2016, Swerts joined RFC Seraing in the third-tier Belgian National Division 1. In January 2018, Swerts moved to KFC Lille in the sixth-tier Eerste Provinciale Antwerpen.

In June 2019, Swerts announced his retirement from football, and would instead focus on coaching youth players at Royal Antwerp.

== Personal life ==
His father is originally from Congo.

== Career statistics ==
Gill Swerts: International goals
No.	Date	Venue	Opponent	Score	Result	Competition
1	1 April 2009	Bilino Polje, Zenica, Bosnia and Herzegovina	Bosnia and Herzegovina	2–1	2–1	2010 WCQ

== Honours ==
AZ

- Eredivisie: 2008–09
