= 1940 in association football =

The following are the football (soccer) events of the year 1940 throughout the world.

== Events ==
- 14 October – Honduran club C.D.S. Vida is established.

== Winners club national championship ==
- Argentina: Boca Juniors
- Chile: Universidad de Chile
- Germany: FC Schalke 04
- Italy: Internazionale Milano F.C.
- Netherlands: Feyenoord Rotterdam
- Scotland
  - Scottish Cup: No competition
- Spain:Athletic Aviación
- Romania: Venus București
- Turkey: Fenerbahçe, Eskişehir Demirspor

== Births ==
- January 5 – Hans Eijkenbroek, Dutch international footballer and manager (died 2024)
- January 14 – Terry Murphy, English former professional footballer (died 2019)
- January 20 – Erik Dyreborg, Danish international footballer (died 2013)
- January 23 – Werner Krämer, German international footballer (died 2010)
- January 24 – Brian Labone, English international footballer (died 2006)
- January 25 – Jürgen Sundermann, German international footballer and manager
- January 30 – Roger Marklew, English professional footballer (died 2006)
- February 24 – Wolfgang Solz, German international footballer (died 2017)
- March 5 – Josef Piontek, German international footballer, manager and trainer of the Danish National Team
- March 13 – Tony Knights, English professional footballer (died 2001)
- March 28 – Luis Cubilla, Uruguayan footballer and manager (died 2013)
- April 1 – Gary Townend, English former footballer (died 2021)
- April 12 – Antonio de Oliveira, former Brazilian footballer
- April 20 – Norrie Gillespie, Scottish former footballer
- May 3 – Clemens Westerhof, Dutch football manager
- May 10 – Vicente Miera, Spanish football manager
- May 19 – Frans Bouwmeester, Dutch international footballer
- June 2 – Gordon Harris, English international footballer (died 2014)
- June 18 – Ken Shellito, English football olayer and manager (died 2018)
- June 30 – Marian Cygan, Polish football player and manager (died 2026)
- July 26 – Jürgen Kurbjuhn, German international footballer (died 2014)
- October 4 – Silvio Marzolini, Argentine international footballer (died 2020)
- October 17 – Harry Heijnen, Dutch international footballer (died 2015)
- October 23 – Edson Arantes do Nascimento "Pelé", Brazilian international footballer (died 2022)
- November 25 – Jan Jongbloed, Dutch footballer and coach

== Deaths ==
- October 19 - Umberto Caligaris, Italian defender, winner of the 1934 FIFA World Cup, most capped player for Italy from 1932 until 1971 and active manager of Juventus FC (39; aneurysm)
