= AZ Alkmaar =

Association football club in Netherlands

AZ
- Full name: Alkmaar Zaanstreek
- Nickname: De Kaasboeren (The Cheese Farmers)
- Short name: AZ
- Founded: 10 May 1967; 59 years ago
- Ground: AFAS Stadion
- Capacity: 19,500
- Executive director Technical director: Merijn Zeeman; Max Huiberts
- Chairman: René Neelissen
- Head coach: Lee-Roy Echteld
- League: Eredivisie
- 2025–26: Eredivisie, 7th of 18
- Website: www.az.nl
Home colours	Away colours

Alkmaar Zaanstreek (Dutch: [ˈɑl(ə)kmaːr ˈzaːnstreːk]), better known internationally as AZ Alkmaar, or simply and most commonly as AZ (pronounced [aːˈzɛt]) in the Netherlands, is a Dutch professional football club from Alkmaar and the Zaan district. The club plays in the Eredivisie, the top tier in Dutch football.

AZ won the Eredivisie in 1980–81 and 2008–09. In 1981, they reached the UEFA Cup final, which they lost to Ipswich Town. The team has won the KNVB Cup five times, most recently in 2025–26. They have won the Johan Cruyff Shield twice, in 2009 and 2026.

== History ==
=== 1967–1972: Foundation and first years ===
AZ was founded on 10 May 1967 as AZ '67, the result of a merger of Alkmaar '54 and FC Zaanstreek. Alkmaar '54 was founded as a professional team in April 1954 to play in the 10-team NBVB league, created because the Royal Dutch Football Association (KNVB) refused to organize a professional league (the KNVB took over in 1955). Alkmaar '54, and by extension AZ, played the first professional match in the Netherlands: on 14 August 1954, they won 3–0 at home against Venlo '54, with Klaas Smit scoring the first and third goal. After winning the Eerste Divisie in 1960–61, it played one year in the Eredivisie.

FC Zaanstreek had been playing since 1910 as the Kooger Football Club (KFC). KFC had nearly become national champion in 1934 through a narrow loss to Ajax in the finals. (Note: Klaas en Cees Molenaar had been at this match and blamed Ajax' late equalizer on a mistake by the referee; they claimed they then swore to once become national champion with their team, with which they succeeded 47 years later.) The team became professional in 1955. In 1964 the professional part of KFC was renamed FC Zaanstreek, while the amateurs played on as KFC.

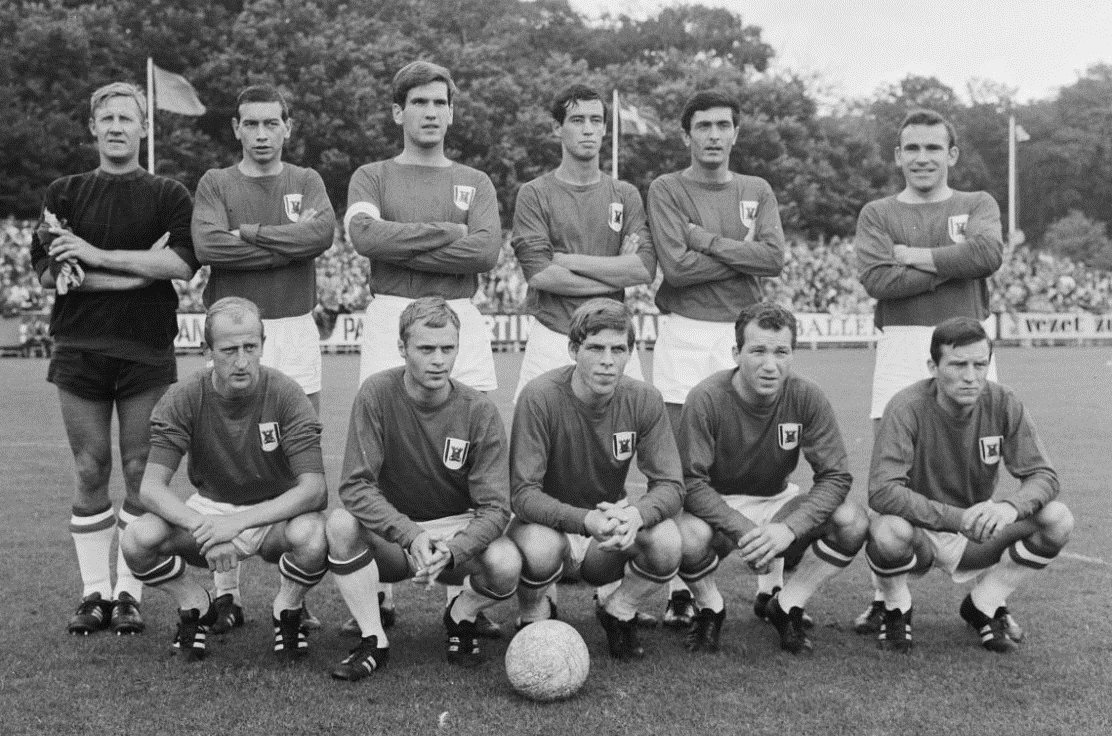
AZ 67's squad in 1968

Also in 1964, the brothers Cees and Klaas Molenaar, former players and trainers for KFC and owners of a growing appliance store chain, sought to create a powerful football team in Zaanstreek by merging the two local professional teams: KFC and Zaanlandsche Football Club. After the ZFC leadership thwarted this attempt, the Molenaars successfully merged FC Zaanstreek with Alkmaar '54 in 1967. FC Zaanstreek had finished 7th and Alkmaar '54 12th in 1966–67 Eerste Divisie. The team would be based in Alkmaar, though the second team originally trained and played in Koog aan de Zaan.

=== 1972–1985: Molenaar years ===
Partially through the hiring of expensive foreign players, the new club soon acquired large debts. In 1972, the Molenaar brothers bailed it out and invested heavily in the club, to the point that AZ '67 were successful in the late 1970s and early '80s, regularly playing European football from 1977 to 1982 while also winning three KNVB Cups over that period.

After four close league campaigns, AZ '67 finally became Dutch champions in 1981, becoming the only team other than the "big three" of Ajax, Feyenoord and PSV to do so in a 44-year period spanning from 1965 to 2009 (when AZ once again won the league title). They won the title with overwhelming power, winning 27 of 34 matches and only losing once, while scoring a club record 101 goals and conceding just 30. That same season, AZ '67 reached the final of the UEFA Cup, losing 5–4 on aggregate to Ipswich Town. The next year, in the European Cup, they lost in the second round 3–2 on aggregate to Liverpool.

Georg Keßler was AZ's manager over most of these years (1978–82), while star players included: Kees Kist, the club's highest ever goalscorer with 212 goals and the first ever Dutchman to win the European Golden Boot in 1979 when he scored 34 goals in a season; Jan Peters, who played 120 matches for AZ '67 during this period scoring 30 goals from midfield; and Hugo Hovenkamp, who played 239 matches in defence for AZ '67 from 1975 to 1983, as well as receiving 31 caps for the Netherlands national team from 1977 to 1983 and playing each match in UEFA Euro 1980 while an AZ '67 player. Additional stars included John Metgod, who spent six years at AZ '67 playing 195 matches as a defender, scoring 26 goals including a goal against Ipswich Town in the final of the UEFA Cup. Like Hovenkamp, Metgod was also included in the Dutch squad for Euro 1980. Meanwhile, Danish forward Kristen Nygaard spent ten years at AZ '67, scoring 104 goals in 363 matches between 1972 and 1982.

=== 1985–1993: Interim years ===
Co-owner Cees Molenaar died in 1979. AZ'67's fortunes deteriorated after his brother, Klaas Molenaar, left the club in 1985. The club's name was shortened to just AZ in 1986. After several mid-table finishes in previous seasons, AZ was relegated in 1988 from the Eredivisie, ending the season on 28 points from 34 matches and falling to the Eerste Divisie due to the superior goal difference of Roda JC. This relegation was significant since it occurred just seven years after the club's historic domestic double and marked the end of AZ's first period of success in Dutch football. Following this, AZ spent much of the next decade in the second tier, struggling to find a return to the top flight.

=== 1993–2009: Scheringa years ===
The involvement of businessman Dirk Scheringa in the mid-1990s marked the revival of the club as AZ returned to the Eredivisie, winning the 1997-98 Eerste Divisie title. The club achieved consecutive finishes around the middle positions in the league until ending up in third place in the 2004-05 Eredivisie season, AZ's highest position for 23 years. In the summer of 2006, the club moved to a new 17,000 capacity stadium, AZ Stadion.

Despite playing strongly for the majority of the 2006–07 season, AZ's season ended in disappointment. First, entering the last matchday of the 2006–07 Eredivisie season, AZ led PSV and Ajax on goal difference at the top of the league table, but ended up third after losing their last match against 16th placed team Excelsior, AZ played with ten men for 80 minutes. Additionally, AZ then lost the KNVB Cup final to Ajax 8–7 after a penalty shoot-out, while also falling to Ajax over two play-off matches for participation in the Champions League. After the season, key players like Tim de Cler, Danny Koevermans and Shota Arveladze left the team.

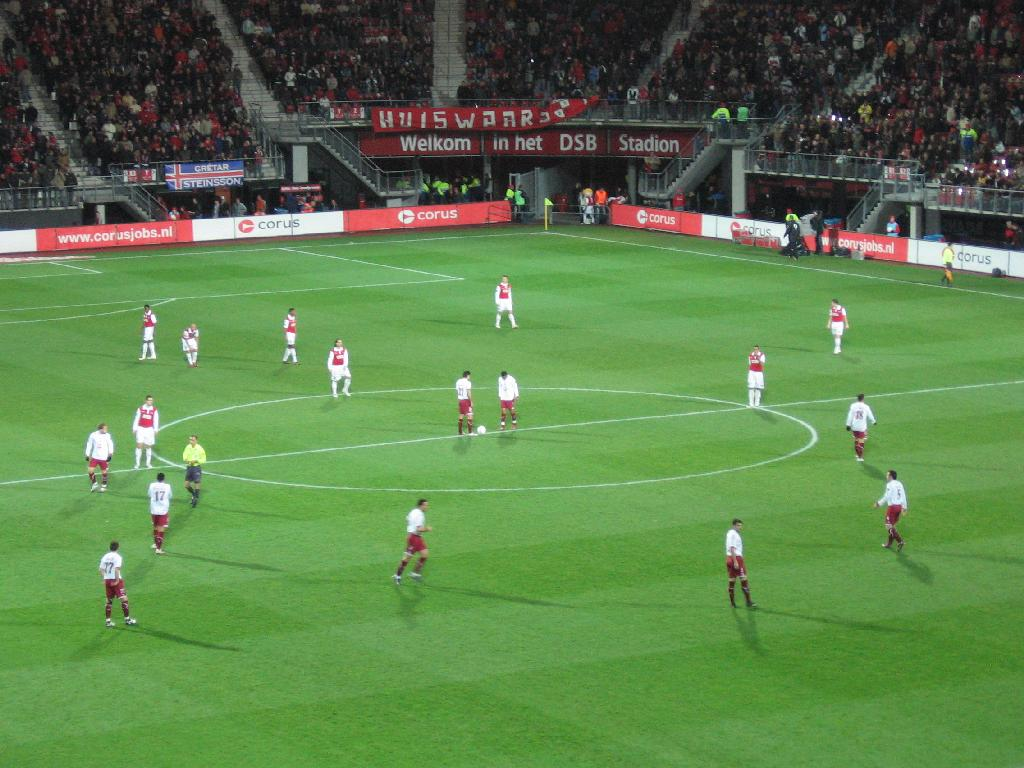
AZ versus AEL in a 2007–08 UEFA Cup match

A remarkable run ended in the 2007–08 season: after AZ lost a group stage match against Everton (3–2) in the UEFA Cup, the club's unbeaten run of 32 home matches in European competitions – lasting from 1977 to 2007 – ended. AZ had a poor season, suffering elimination in the first round of the KNVB Cup and the group stage of the UEFA Cup, as well as finishing the 2007–08 Eredivisie in a disappointing 11th place. Towards the latter stages of the season, in March 2008, AZ manager Louis van Gaal had initially tendered his resignation, but after protests the players and directors, he rescinded his resignation.

The 2008–09 season had an unpromising start after two opening defeats against NAC Breda and ADO Den Haag. However, starting with a 1–0 victory over defending league champions PSV, AZ did not lose a match in its next 28 matches, including a run of 11-straight matches where AZ did not concede an opposition goal. Three weeks before the end of the season, AZ became Eredivisie champions, edging nearest title rivals Twente and Ajax comfortably. This was a historic achievement for the club as this was the first title-winning season for 28 years, and it also meant a return to the UEFA Champions League.

Being league champions, AZ qualified for the Champions League for only the second time. It was drawn into a group alongside Arsenal FC, Standard Liège and Olympiacos but only took four points from six matches and finished bottom of their group.

=== 2009–2014: Advocaat–Verbeek years ===
For the 2009–10 season, Ronald Koeman succeeded Louis van Gaal, who had departed to manage Bayern Munich after leading AZ to the championship. Koeman was officially hired on 17 May 2009, but on 5 December, AZ announced he was no longer in charge of the club after losing 7 of his first 16 matches. Former Rangers and Zenit Saint Petersburg manager Dick Advocaat took over for the remainder of the season. Under Advocaat, AZ achieved solid results and secured European football for the next season.

For the 2010–11 season, AZ appointed Gertjan Verbeek as its new manager. They finished the 2010–11 Eredivisie in fourth place, thus securing Europa League football for the next season, while in the KNVB Cup, AZ reached the last eight, where they were beaten by rivals Ajax by a 1–0 scoreline. AZ also finished third in their Europa League group, thus failing to qualifying for the competition's knockout round.

In the 2011–12 season, AZ finished fourth in the Eredivisie, though performed significantly better in cup competitions, reaching the semi-finals in the KNVB Cup (losing to Heracles after extra time) and the quarter-finals in the Europa League. In the latter, the club ultimately lost to Valencia after having defeated Udinese, Anderlecht, Malmö FF, Austria Wien, Metalist Kharkiv, Aalesund and Baumit Jablonec to reach that stage.

On 21 December 2011, during the quarter-finals of the 2011–12 KNVB Cup, a 19-year-old Ajax fan invaded the Amsterdam Arena pitch in the 36th minute with Ajax winning 1–0, attacking AZ goalkeeper Esteban Alvarado. The fan slipped and Alvarado kicked the fan twice, prompting the referee to issue the goalkeeper a red card. Following this, AZ manager Gertjan Verbeek ordered his players to leave the pitch for the dressing room in protest. The match was later played on 19 January 2012, with Alvarado's red card rescinded; AZ won 3–2.

The 2012–13 season started in the Europa League with a qualifying play-off round against Guus Hiddink's Anzhi Makhachkala. AZ was hammered 6–0 on aggregate. Disappointingly, AZ finished tenth in the 2012–13 Eredivisie, although the club won the 2012–13 KNVB Cup after defeating PSV 2–1 in the final. As cup winners, AZ automatically qualified for the 2013–14 Europa League.

In September 2013, just one day after emphatically beating PSV, at the time the league leaders, Verbeek was dismissed as first team manager by the club due to "a lack of chemistry" between management and players. He was replaced by Dick Advocaat for the remainder of the season until a permanent replacement could be found. Advocaat took AZ to the semi-finals of the KNVB Cup, the quarter-finals of the Europa League and eighth in the league, ultimately losing to Groningen in the Europa League play-off final round (their 58th match of the season, a club record).

=== 2014–2019: Van den Brom years ===
The 2014–15 season began with a new manager, former Heerenveen manager and Ajax great Marco van Basten. However, after just three matches into the season, Van Basten resigned as manager to become assistant manager under Alex Pastoor, citing heavy stress as the main reason. Pastoor was the interim manager during two matches under Van Basten's absence and received the official title on 16 September, but contract negotiations failed and he left the club just two days later. A week later, John van den Brom was appointed manager. Under Van den Brom, AZ quickly rose up to the sub-top, eventually finished the season in third place, surpassing Feyenoord on the final season's matchday and qualifying for the 2015–16 Europa League.

The 2015–16 Eredivisie started with AZ selling most of its first-team players from the previous season during the summer transfer period. As a response, AZ bought players from other Dutch clubs, notably Vincent Janssen from Almere City, Alireza Jahanbakhsh from NEC and Ben Rienstra from PEC Zwolle. In December, it was announced free agent Ron Vlaar signed a contract until the end of the season after training with the club for a few weeks prior. Vlaar quickly became team captain and helped lift AZ from tenth place to a fourth-place finish in the league. Along this rise, new signing Vincent Janssen scored 27 goals for the club, earning him the Eredivisie top goalscorer title. In the 2015–16 KNVB Cup, AZ reached the semi-finals, losing 3–1 to Feyenoord. AZ won the first two qualification rounds to qualify for the 2015–16 Europa League group stage, but finished last in their group.

At the start of the 2016–17 Eredivisie, AZ sold Vincent Janssen to Tottenham Hotspur and long-time midfielder Markus Henriksen to Hull City. In the 2016–17 Europa League, AZ finished second in Group D, surviving the group stage for the third time in five seasons.

=== 2020–2024: Slot–Jansen years ===
After an excellent 2019/20 season in which AZ beat league leaders Ajax home and away, aided by consistent performances from youth academy talents such as Teun Koopmeiners, Myron Boadu, Calvin Stengs and Owen Wijndal, the season was forced to end early due to the effects of the COVID-19 pandemic. Joint on points with Ajax at the top of the table, AZ were given second place on goal difference, and subsequently earned Qualification to the Champions League second qualifying round.

A poor start to their 2020/21 Eredivisie campaign saw AZ draw five games in a row, before eventually picking up a victory against RKC Waalwijk on 1 November 2020.

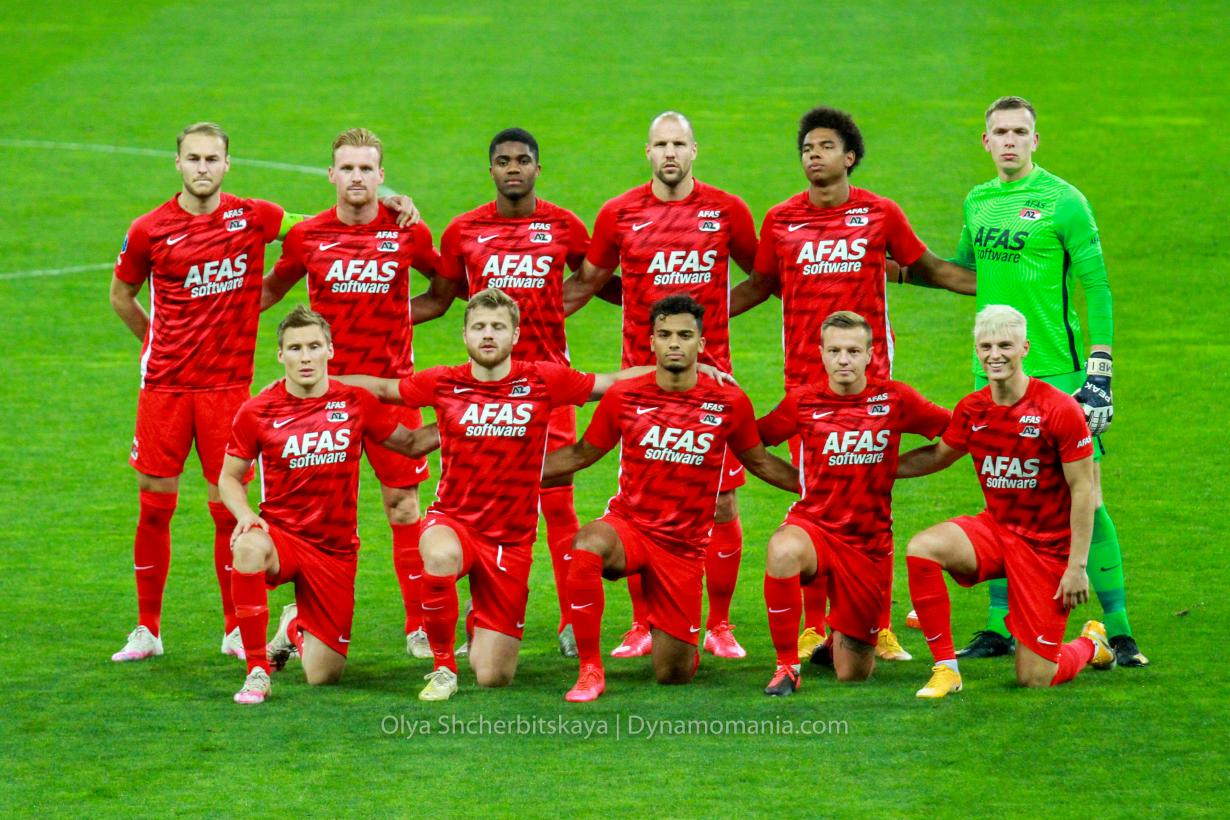
AZ Alkmaar's squad in a match against Dynamo Kyiv in the Champions League qualifiers 2021.

AZ also struggled in European competitions this season. Despite a strong start, with a 3–1 extra time come back against Viktoria Plzen in the Champions League qualifiers, the club lost 2–0 to Dynamo Kyiv several weeks later, seeing them fall back into the Europa League. After victory against Napoli and Rijeka early in the pool stages, AZ was on track to advance, though lost to Real Sociedad away, obtained a 0–0 draw in the reverse fixture, and also drew 1–1 with Napoli. Following these results, AZ needed to defeat Rijeka away to advance. However, the departure the week before the game of manager Arne Slot saw an unorganised team lose 2–1 to Rijeka, ending their European dream.

In 2022–2023, AZ stepped up their performance in Europa Conference League play, winning five out of six Group E matches against SC Dnipro-1, Apollon Limassol and Vaduz, then beating Lazio 4–2 on aggregate. However, their run was ended by defeats to West Ham United, with AZ's home leg marred by supporter violence.

In the 2023–24 season, AZ had a disappointed season, they get eliminated early in the group stage of the UEFA Conference League. After only winning against the amateurs club Quick Boys on penalty shootout in the KNVB, AZ fired coach Pascal Jansen on 17 January 2024.

=== Since 2024: Martens–Echteld years ===
AZ's new manager was Maarten Martens, a former AZ player. After joined the club, he led AZ to a fourth place in the league, which secured the qualification for Europa League. In 2025, AZ reached the final of the KNVB Cup, but then lost against Go Ahead Eagles on penalty shootout. On 9 May 2025, AZ extended Martens's contract until the summer of 2028. Before the beginning of the 2025–26 season, Leaseweb became the new shirt sponsor for AZ Alkmaar.

== Coaching staff ==
Statistic from April 2026

Position	Staff
Head coach	(Netherlands) Lee-Roy Echteld
Assistant coach	(Netherlands) Robert Franssen (Netherlands) Maarten Stekelenburg (Netherlands) Jan Sierksma
Goalkeeper coach	(Netherlands) Sjoerd Woudenberg
Fitness coach	(Netherlands) Niels Kok
Chief Scout	(Netherlands) Dennis Haar
Scout	(Netherlands) Arthur Numan (Netherlands) Hugo Hovenkamp (Netherlands) Lars Engel (Netherlands) Fred-Jan Leusken (Netherlands) Stephan Etten
Club doctor	(Netherlands) Ingrid Paul
Physiotherapist	(Netherlands) Martin Cruijff (Netherlands) Frank Renzenbrink
Team Manager	(Netherlands) Ari Menmi
Technical director	(Netherlands) Max Huiberts

== Players ==
As of 7 September 2026

Note: Flags indicate national team as defined under FIFA eligibility rules; some limited exceptions apply. Players may hold more than one non-FIFA nationality.

No.	Pos.	Nation	Player
1	GK	NED	Rome-Jayden Owusu-Oduro
2	DF	JPN	Seiya Maikuma
3	DF	NED	Wouter Goes
4	DF	NED	Lewis Schouten
5	DF	MEX	Mateo Chávez
6	MF	NED	Peer Koopmeiners
7	FW	BRA	Weslley Patati
8	MF	NED	Jordy Clasie (captain)
9	FW	NED	Mexx Meerdink
10	MF	NED	Kees Smit
11	FW	NED	Ro-Zangelo Daal
12	GK	NED	Hobie Verhulst
14	FW	NED	Calvin Stengs
16	MF	NED	Stije Resink

No.	Pos.	Nation	Player
17	MF	DEN	Valdemar Byskov
18	FW	HUN	Bendegúz Kovács
19	FW	NED	Jizz Hornkamp
20	DF	ITA	Andrea Natali
21	MF	NED	Dave Kwakman
22	DF	NED	Elijah Dijkstra
24	FW	MAR	Ayoub Oufkir
27	FW	NED	Wassim Bouziane
28	GK	BEL	Jari De Busser
29	DF	NED	Wesley Hoedt
30	DF	NED	Denso Kasius
31	DF	JPN	Rion Ichihara
34	DF	NED	Mees de Wit
41	GK	NED	Jeroen Zoet

=== Out on loan ===
Note: Flags indicate national team as defined under FIFA eligibility rules; some limited exceptions apply. Players may hold more than one non-FIFA nationality.

No.	Pos.	Nation	Player
—	MF	NED	Kasper Boogaard (at Willem II until 30 June 2027)
—	DF	NED	Billy van Duijl (at SC Cambuur until 30 June 2027)
—	FW	NED	Sem van Duijn (at FC Utrecht until 30 June 2027)
—	DF	NED	Sam de Grand (at Lommel SK until 30 June 2027)
—	FW	DEN	Isak Jensen (at FC Lorient until 30 June 2027)

No.	Pos.	Nation	Player
—	DF	POR	Alexandre Penetra (at Corum FK until 30 June 2027)
—	DF	FRA	Abdelnour Soualhia (at SC Telstar until 30 June 2027)
—	MF	CZE	Matěj Šín (at ADO Den Haag until 30 June 2027)
—	FW	NED	Lequincio Zeefuik (at Fortuna Sittard until 30 June 2027)

=== Jong AZ ===
Participating in the Eerste Divisie, the reserve squad of AZ trains and plays their home games in Zaanstad.

== Former players ==
=== National team players ===
The following players were called up to represent their national teams in international football and received caps during their tenure with AZ Alkmaar:

- Argentina
  - (Argentina) Sergio Romero (2007–2011)
  Australia
  - (Australia) James Holland (2009–2012)
  - (Australia) Brett Holman (2008–2012)
  - (Australia) Mathew Ryan (2023–2024)
  Austria
  - (Austria) Kurt Welzl (1978–1981)
  Belgium
  - (Belgium) Mousa Dembélé (2006–2010)
  - (Belgium) Stein Huysegems (2003–2006)
  - (Belgium) Maarten Martens (2006–2014)
  - (Belgium) Sébastien Pocognoli (2007–2010)
  - (Belgium) Gill Swerts (2008–2011)
  Cameroon
  - (Cameroon) Willie Overtoom (2013–2014)
  Costa Rica
  - (Costa Rica) Esteban Alvarado (2010–2015)
  Denmark
  - (Denmark) Henrik Eigenbrod (1982–1984)
  - (Denmark) Kristen Nygaard (1972–1982)
  - (Denmark) Kenneth Perez (2000–2006)
  - (Denmark) Simon Poulsen (2008–2012; 2014–2015)
  Estonia
  - (Estonia) Ragnar Klavan (2009–2012)
  Finland
  - (Finland) Niki Mäenpää (2011–2012)
  - (Finland) Niklas Moisander (2008–2012)
  - (Finland) Juha Reini (2002–2006)
  Georgia
  - (Georgia (country)) Shota Arveladze (2005–2007)
  Ghana
  - (Ghana) Kamal Sowah (2022)
  Greece
  - (Greece) Pantelis Chatzidiakos (2015–2023)
  - (Greece) Vangelis Pavlidis (2021–2024)
  Hungary
  - (Hungary) Milos Kerkez (2022–2023)
  Iceland
  - (Iceland) Joey Guðjónsson (2006–2007)
  - (Iceland) Albert Guðmundsson (2018–2022)
  - (Iceland) Jóhann Berg Guðmundsson (2009–2014)
  - (Iceland) Kolbeinn Sigþórsson (2010–2011)
  - (Iceland) Grétar Steinsson (2006–2008)
  Iran
  - (Iran) Alireza Jahanbakhsh (2015–2018)
- Japan
  - (Japan) **Seiya Maikuma (2024–present)**
  - (Japan) Yukinari Sugawara (2020–2024)
  Mexico
  - (Mexico) **Mateo Chávez (2025–present)**
  - (Mexico) Héctor Moreno (2008–2011)
  Morocco
  - (Morocco) Zakaria Aboukhlal (2019–2022)
  - (Morocco) Nourdin Boukhari (2007)
  - (Morocco) Ali Elkhattabi (2001–2006)
  - (Morocco) Abdelkrim El Hadrioui (1998–2002)
  - (Morocco) Mounir El Hamdaoui (2007–2010; 2015–2016)
  - (Morocco) Oussama Idrissi (2018–2020)
  - (Morocco) Adil Ramzi (2004–2006)
  - (Morocco) Tarik Sektioui (2004–2006)
  Netherlands
  - (Netherlands) Peter Arntz (1976–1985)
  - (Netherlands) Roy Beerens (2011–2014)
  - (Netherlands) Marco Bizot (2017–2021)
  - (Netherlands) Myron Boadu (2017–2021)
  - (Netherlands) Dries Boussatta (1998–2002)
  - (Netherlands) Tim de Cler (2002–2007)
  - (Netherlands) Barry van Galen (1997–2006)
  - (Netherlands) Willem van Hanegem (1976–1979)
  - (Netherlands) Hugo Hovenkamp (1975–1983)
  - (Netherlands) Kew Jaliens (2004–2011)
  - (Netherlands) Vincent Janssen (2015–2016)
  - (Netherlands) Jos Jonker (1980–1983)
  - (Netherlands) Danny Koevermans (2005–2007)
  - (Netherlands) Kees Kist (1972–1982; 1984–1985)
  - (Netherlands) Teun Koopmeiners (2017–2021)
  - (Netherlands) Jan Kromkamp (2000–2005)
  - (Netherlands) Denny Landzaat (2003–2006)
  - (Netherlands) Adam Maher (2010–2013; 2018–2019)
  - (Netherlands) Dirk Marcellis (2010–2015)
  - (Netherlands) Bruno Martins Indi (2020–2025)
  - (Netherlands) Joris Mathijsen (2004–2006)
  - (Netherlands) **Mexx Meerdink (2023–present)**
  - (Netherlands) Martijn Meerdink (2002–2007)
  - (Netherlands) David Mendes da Silva (2006–2010)
  - (Netherlands) John Metgod (1976–1982)
  - (Netherlands) Oscar Moens (1996–2003)
  - (Netherlands) Barry Opdam (1996–2008)
  - (Netherlands) Jan Peters (1977–1982)
  - (Netherlands) Henk van Rijnsoever (1974–1982)
  - (Netherlands) Stijn Schaars (2005–2011)
  - (Netherlands) **Kees Smit (2024–present)**
  - (Netherlands) Ronald Spelbos (1974–1982)
- **Netherlands** (continued)
  - (Netherlands) Calvin Stengs (2017–2021)
  - (Netherlands) Guus Til (2016–2019)
  - (Netherlands) Henk Timmer (2000–2006)
  - (Netherlands) Pier Tol (1978–1988)
  - (Netherlands) Nick Viergever (2010–2014)
  - (Netherlands) Ron Vlaar (2004–2006; 2015–2021)
  - (Netherlands) Bobby Vosmaer (1974–1978)
  - (Netherlands) Wout Weghorst (2016–2018)
  - (Netherlands) Owen Wijndal (2017–2022)
  - (Netherlands) Demy de Zeeuw (2005–2009)
  Norway
  - (Norway) Håkon Evjen (2020–2023)
  - (Norway) Markus Henriksen (2012–2017)
  - (Norway) Bjørn Maars Johnsen (2018–2020)
  - (Norway) Fredrik Midtsjø (2017–2022)
  - (Norway) Jonas Svensson (2017–2021)
  - (Norway) David Møller Wolfe (2023–2025)
  Paraguay
  - (Paraguay) Celso Ortiz (2010–2016)
  Republic of Ireland
  - (Republic of Ireland) **Troy Parrott (2024–present)**
  Romania
  - (Romania) Dorin Rotariu (2018–2019)
  Serbia
  - (Serbia) Kristijan Belić (2024–2026)
  - (Serbia) Nemanja Gudelj (2013–2015)
  Suriname
  - (Suriname) Ramon Leeuwin (2020–2021)
  Sweden
  - (Sweden) Rasmus Elm (2009–2012)
  - (Sweden) Mattias Johansson (2012–2017)
  - (Sweden) Jesper Karlsson (2020–2023)
  - (Sweden) Muamer Tanković (2014–2017)
  - (Sweden) Pontus Wernbloom (2009–2012)
  Trinidad and Tobago
  - (Trinidad and Tobago) Levi García (2015–2018)
  United States
  - (United States) Jozy Altidore (2011–2013)
  - (United States) Aron Jóhannsson (2013–2015)
  - (United States) Djordje Mihailovic (2023–2024)

- Players in bold actively play for AZ Alkmaar and for their respective national teams. Years in brackets indicate careerspan with AZ.

=== National team players by Confederation ===
Member associations are listed in order of most to least amount of current and former AZ players represented Internationally

Total national team players by confederation
Confederation	Total	(Nation) Association
AFC	6	Australia (3), Japan (2), Iran (1)
CAF	10	Morocco (8), Cameroon (1), Ghana (1)
CONCACAF	8	United States (3), Mexico (2), Costa Rica (1), Suriname (1), Trinidad and Tobago (1)
CONMEBOL	2	Argentina (1), Paraguay (1)
OFC	0	
UEFA	76	Netherlands (42), Norway (6), Belgium (5), Iceland (5), Sweden (5), Denmark (4), Finland (3), Greece (2), Serbia (2), Austria (1), Estonia (1), (Georgia (country)) Georgia (1), Hungary (1), (Republic of Ireland) Ireland (1), Romania (1)

== Players in international tournaments ==
The following is a list of AZ players who have competed in international tournaments, including the FIFA World Cup, UEFA European Championship, AFC Asian Cup, Africa Cup of Nations, CONCACAF Gold Cup and the Copa América. To this date no AZ players have participated in the FIFA Confederations Cup or the OFC Nations Cup while playing for AZ Alkmaar.

Cup	Players
(Socialist Federal Republic of Yugoslavia) UEFA Euro 1976	(Netherlands) Hugo Hovenkamp (Netherlands) Kees Kist (Netherlands) John Metgod
(Argentina) 1978 FIFA World Cup	(Netherlands) Hugo Hovenkamp
(Italy) UEFA Euro 1980	(Netherlands) Hugo Hovenkamp (Netherlands) Kees Kist
(Ghana) (Nigeria) 2000 Africa Cup of Nations	(Morocco) Abdelkarim El Hadrioui
(Portugal) UEFA Euro 2004	(Denmark) Kenneth Perez
(Germany) 2006 FIFA World Cup	(Netherlands) Tim de Cler (Netherlands) Kew Jaliens (Netherlands) Denny Landzaat (Netherlands) Joris Mathijsen (Netherlands) Henk Timmer
(Austria) (Switzerland) UEFA Euro 2008	(Netherlands) Demy de Zeeuw
(South Africa) 2010 FIFA World Cup	(Australia) Brett Holman (Mexico) Héctor Moreno (Denmark) Simon Poulsen (Argentina) Sergio Romero (Netherlands) Stijn Schaars
(Qatar) 2011 AFC Asian Cup	(Australia) Brett Holman
(Argentina) 2011 Copa América	(Argentina) Sergio Romero
(United States) 2011 CONCACAF Gold Cup	(Mexico) Héctor Moreno
(Poland) (Ukraine) UEFA Euro 2012	(Sweden) Rasmus Elm (Denmark) Simon Poulsen
(Canada) (United States) 2015 CONCACAF Gold Cup	(Costa Rica) Esteban Alvarado (United States) Aron Jóhannsson
(United States) 2016 Copa América	(Paraguay) Celso Ortiz
(Russia) 2018 FIFA World Cup	(Iran) Alireza Jahanbakhsh
(Egypt) 2019 Africa Cup of Nations	(Morocco) Oussama Idrissi
(European Union) UEFA Euro 2020	(Netherlands) Marco Bizot (Netherlands) Teun Koopmeiners (Netherlands) Owen Wijndal
(Cameroon) 2021 Africa Cup of Nations	(Morocco) Zakaria Aboukhlal
(Qatar) 2023 AFC Asian Cup	(Australia) Mathew Ryan (Japan) Yukinari Sugawara
(Canada) (United States) 2023 CONCACAF Gold Cup	(United States) Djordje Mihailovic
(Canada) (Mexico) (United States) 2026 FIFA World Cup	(Mexico) Mateo Chávez

== Stadium and sponsor ==
=== Stadium ===
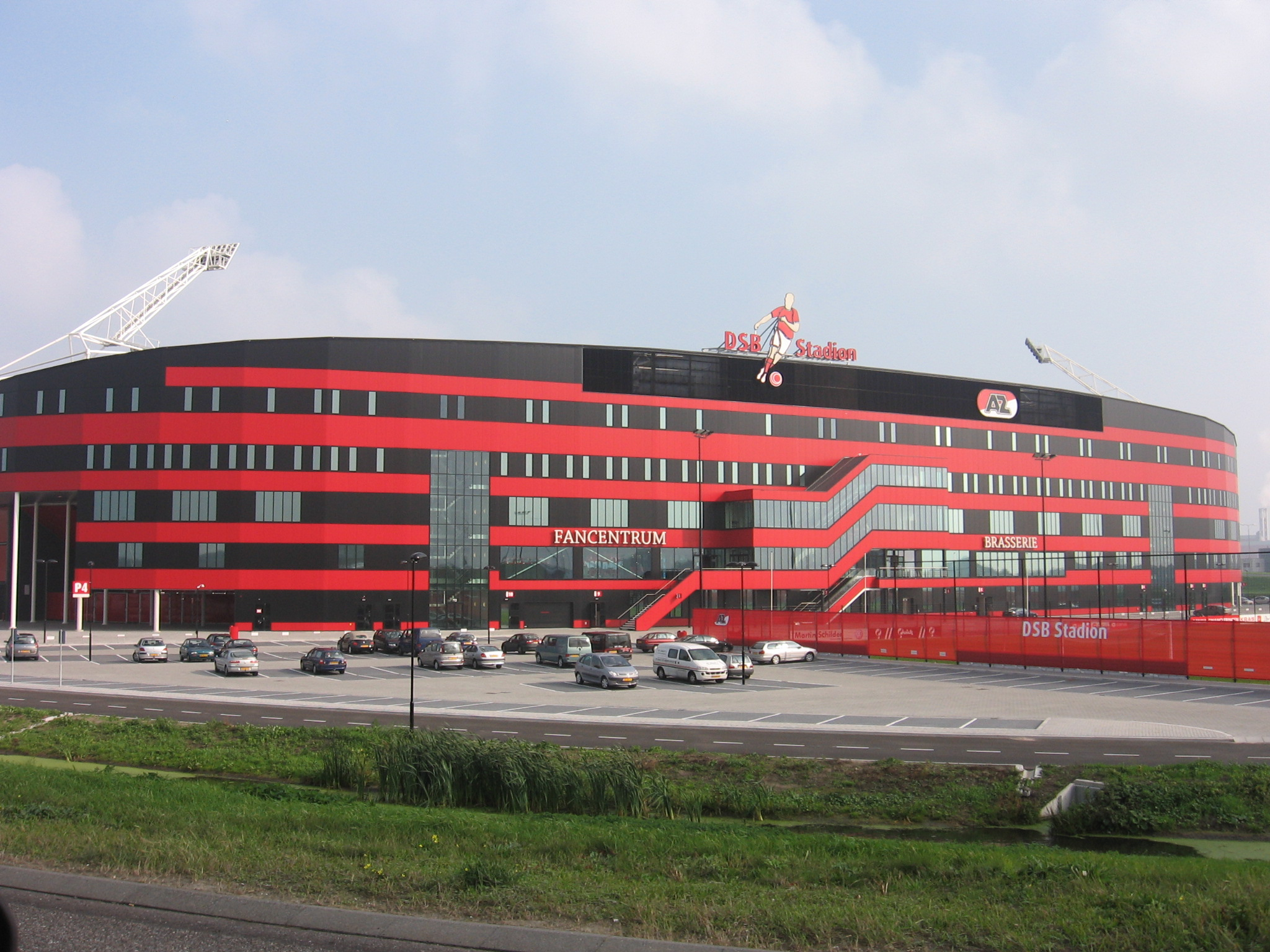
AFAS Stadion, AZ's home venue in Alkmaar. Photo includes the old roof and the old name, 'DSB Stadion'.

AZ play its home matches at the AFAS Stadion, located in the southern part of the city of Alkmaar. The stadium, which is directly owned by the club, was opened in 2006 and replaced the old Alkmaarderhout venue as the DSB Stadion. The stadium currently has a capacity of 17,023. During its design stages, the name Victorie Stadion was frequently used, referring to the Dutch War of Independence, the phrase "In Alkmaar begint de victorie" (Victory begins in Alkmaar) in particular. Until now, this name has not been officially in use, the board instead opting for sponsorship deals because of financial motives. However, to this day, the name maintains a good share of support among the fans.

To further increase revenue, AZ's board of directors decided to expand the capacity of the new stadium to at least 30,000 somewhere in the future. The extension will be realised by constructing a second tier to three of the four stands. The main stand with all technical areas, VIP and sponsor and media facilities will remain in place. These plans, however, were put on hold after the DSB bankruptcy and there are no current plans to increase the capacity.

In October 2009, sponsor DSB Bank was declared bankrupt. The stadium name temporarily changed from DSB Stadion to AZ Stadion, as it was considered undesirable that the stadium was linked with a non-existent bank. In February 2010, a new main sponsor was found in construction works service provider BUKO, based in Beverwijk.

A year later, in the 2010–11 season, AFAS Software took over as official stadium sponsor. The current external name of the ground is the AFAS Stadion.

On 10 August 2019, the roof of the stadium partially collapsed. No people were injured during the incident. As the result AZ spent the rest of the year playing home matches at the Cars Jeans Stadion in The Hague whilst the damaged roof was being removed, before returning to the stadium on 15 December 2019, beating Ajax 1–0 in their first match back. AZ played the rest of the 2019/20 season, until the COVID-19 pandemic cut it short, without a roof. During the 2020/21 season, a new roof was installed, held up by 20 crane-like arms on three sides and a so-called mega truss on the main stand. The renewed stadium, which also included a capacity upgrade of nearly 2,500 seats for a new total capacity of 19,500, was officially opened on 11 September 2021, before the home game against PSV.

=== Kit suppliers and shirt sponsors ===
Period	Kit manufacturer	Shirt sponsor
1977–1982	Adidas	
1982–1986	Adidas	Sony
1986–1988	Lotto	Electrolux
1988–1989	Lotto	Swingbo
1989–1990	Reebok	Reebok
1990–1993	Hi-Tec	Frisia
1993–1998	Hummel	Frisia
1998–1999	Kappa	Frisia
1999–2001	none	Frisia
2001–2002	Umbro	Frisia
2002–2004	Umbro	Actus Notarissen
2004–2005	Umbro	Frisia
2005–2006	Umbro	DSB
2006–2008	Quick	DSB
2008–2009	Canterbury	DSB
2009–2010	Quick	BUKO
2010–2011	Quick	AFAS Software
2011–2015	Macron	AFAS Software
2015–2019	Under Armour	AFAS Software
2020–2024	Nike	AFAS Software
2022–2024	Nike	Kansino
2025–	Nike	Leaseweb

== Honours ==
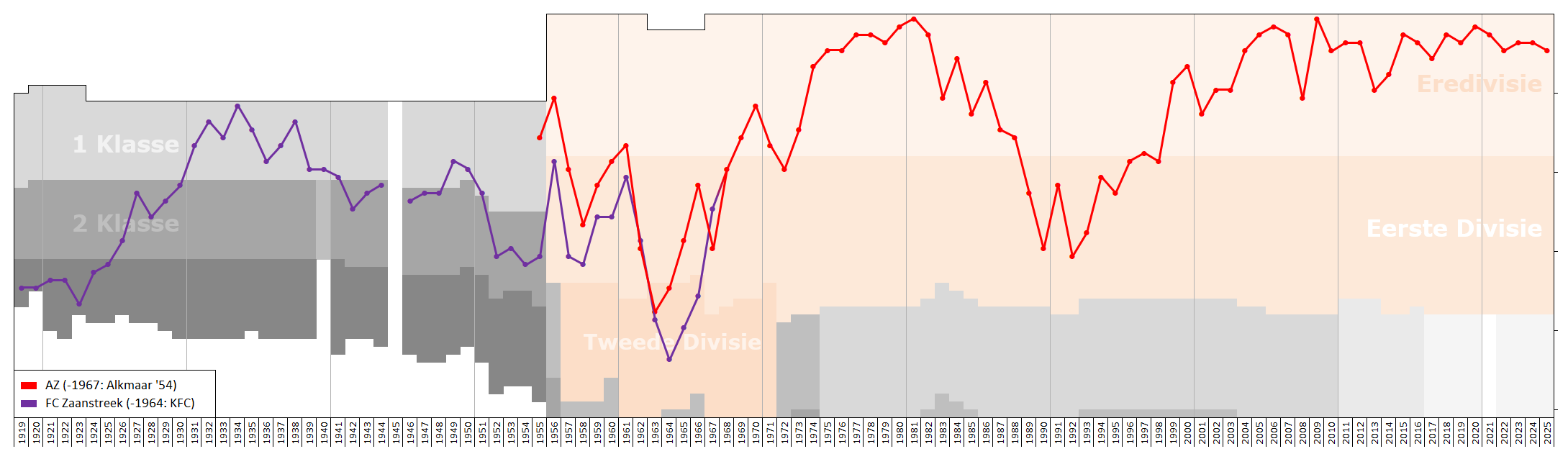
Historical chart of league performance

Type	Competition	Titles	Seasons
Domestic	Eredivisie	2	1980–81, 2008–09
Domestic	Eerste Divisie	3	1959–60, 1995–96, 1997–98
Domestic	Tweede Divisie	1	2016–17*
Domestic	KNVB Cup	5	1977–78, 1980–81, 1981–82, 2012–13, 2025–26
Domestic	Johan Cruyff Shield	2	2009, 2026
* = AZ won the Tweede Divisie title with their youth squad.

== European record ==
=== Matches ===
Season	Competition	Round	Opponent	Home	Away	Aggregate
1977–78	UEFA Cup	First round	(Luxembourg) Red Boys Differdange	11–1	5–0	16–1
1977–78	UEFA Cup	Second round	(Spain) Barcelona	1–1	1–1	1–1 (4–5 p)
1978–79	European Cup Winners' Cup	First round	(England) Ipswich Town	0–0	0–2	0–2
1980–81	UEFA Cup	First round	(Luxembourg) Red Boys Differdange	6–0	4–0	10–0
1980–81	UEFA Cup	Second round	(Bulgaria) Levski Sofia	5–0	1–1	6–1
1980–81	UEFA Cup	Third round	(Socialist Federal Republic of Yugoslavia) Radnički Niš	5–0	2–2	7–2
1980–81	UEFA Cup	Quarter-finals	(Belgium) Lokeren	2–0	0–1	2–1
1980–81	UEFA Cup	Semi-finals	(France) Sochaux	3–2	1–1	4–3
1980–81	UEFA Cup	Final	(England) Ipswich Town	4–2	0–3	4–5
1981–82	European Cup	First round	(Norway) Start	3–1	1–0	4–1
1981–82	European Cup	Round of 16	(England) Liverpool	2–2	2–3	4–5
1982–83	European Cup Winners' Cup	First round	(Republic of Ireland) Limerick	1–0	1–1	2–1
1982–83	European Cup Winners' Cup	Second round	(Italy) Inter Milan	1–0	0–2	1–2
2004–05	UEFA Cup	Group F	(France) Auxerre	2–0	—N/a	1st
2004–05	UEFA Cup	Group F	(Poland) Amica Wronki	—N/a	3–1	1st
2004–05	UEFA Cup	Group F	(Scotland) Rangers	1–0	—N/a	1st
2004–05	UEFA Cup	Group F	(Austria) Grazer AK	—N/a	0–2	1st
2004–05	UEFA Cup	Round of 32	(Germany) Alemannia Aachen	2–1	0–0	2–1
2004–05	UEFA Cup	Round of 16	(Ukraine) Shakhtar Donetsk	2–1	3–1	5–2
2004–05	UEFA Cup	Quarter-finals	(Spain) Villarreal	1–1	2–1	3–2
2004–05	UEFA Cup	Semi-finals	(Portugal) Sporting CP	3–2	1–2	4–4 (a)
2005–06	UEFA Cup	Group D	(Ukraine) Dnipro Dnipropetrovsk	—N/a	2–1	2nd
2005–06	UEFA Cup	Group D	(England) Middlesbrough	0–0	—N/a	2nd
2005–06	UEFA Cup	Group D	(Bulgaria) Litex Lovech	—N/a	2–0	2nd
2005–06	UEFA Cup	Group D	(Switzerland) Grasshoppers	1–0	—N/a	2nd
2005–06	UEFA Cup	Round of 32	(Spain) Real Betis	2–1	0–2	2–3
2006–07	UEFA Cup	Group C	(Portugal) Braga	3–0	—N/a	1st
2006–07	UEFA Cup	Group C	(Switzerland) Grasshoppers	—N/a	5–2	1st
2006–07	UEFA Cup	Group C	(Czech Republic) Slovan Liberec	2–2	—N/a	1st
2006–07	UEFA Cup	Group C	(Spain) Sevilla	—N/a	2–1	1st
2006–07	UEFA Cup	Round of 32	(Turkey) Fenerbahçe	2–2	3–3	5–5 (a)
2006–07	UEFA Cup	Round of 16	(England) Newcastle United	2–0	2–4	4–4 (a)
2006–07	UEFA Cup	Quarter-finals	(Germany) Werder Bremen	0–0	1–4	1–4
2007–08	UEFA Cup	Group A	(Russia) Zenit Saint Petersburg	—N/a	1–1	4th
2007–08	UEFA Cup	Group A	(Greece) AEL	1–0	—N/a	4th
2007–08	UEFA Cup	Group A	(Germany) 1. FC Nürnberg	—N/a	1–2	4th
2007–08	UEFA Cup	Group A	(England) Everton	2–3	—N/a	4th
2009–10	UEFA Champions League	Group H	(Greece) Olympiacos	0–0	0–1	4th
2009–10	UEFA Champions League	Group H	(Belgium) Standard Liège	1–1	1–1	4th
2009–10	UEFA Champions League	Group H	(England) Arsenal	1–1	1–4	4th
2010–11	UEFA Europa League	Group E	(Moldova) Sheriff Tiraspol	2–1	1–1	3rd
2010–11	UEFA Europa League	Group E	(Belarus) BATE Borisov	3–0	1–4	3rd
2010–11	UEFA Europa League	Group E	(Ukraine) Dynamo Kyiv	1–2	0–2	3rd
2011–12	UEFA Europa League	Group G	(Sweden) Malmö FF	4–1	0–0	2nd
2011–12	UEFA Europa League	Group G	(Ukraine) Metalist Kharkiv	1–1	1–1	2nd
2011–12	UEFA Europa League	Group G	Austria Wien	2–2	2–2	2nd
2011–12	UEFA Europa League	Round of 32	(Belgium) Anderlecht	1–0	1–0	2–0
2011–12	UEFA Europa League	Round of 16	(Italy) Udinese	2–0	1–2	3–2
2011–12	UEFA Europa League	Quarter-finals	(Spain) Valencia	2–1	0–4	2–5
2012–13	UEFA Europa League	Play-off round	(Russia) Anzhi Makhachkala	0–5	0–1	0–6
2013–14	UEFA Europa League	Play-off round	(Greece) Atromitos	0–2	3–1	3–3
2013–14	UEFA Europa League	Group L	(Israel) Maccabi Haifa	2–0	1–0	1st
2013–14	UEFA Europa League	Group L	(Greece) PAOK	1–1	2–2	1st
2013–14	UEFA Europa League	Group L	(Kazakhstan) Shakhter Karagandy	1–0	1–1	1st
2013–14	UEFA Europa League	Round of 32	(Czech Republic) Slovan Liberec	1–1	1–0	1-2
2013–14	UEFA Europa League	Round of 16	(Russia) Anzhi Makhachkala	1–0	0–0	1–0
2013–14	UEFA Europa League	Quarter-finals	(Portugal) Benfica	0–1	0–2	0–3
2015–16	UEFA Europa League	Third qualifying round	(Turkey) İstanbul Başakşehir	2–0	2–1	4–1
2015–16	UEFA Europa League	Play-off round	(Romania) Astra Giurgiu	2–0	2–3	4–3
2015–16	UEFA Europa League	Group L	(Serbia) Partizan	1–2	2–3	4th
2015–16	UEFA Europa League	Group L	(Spain) Athletic Bilbao	2–1	2–2	4th
2015–16	UEFA Europa League	Group L	(Germany) FC Augsburg	0–1	1–4	4th
2016–17	UEFA Europa League	Third qualifying round	(Greece) PAS Giannina	1–0	2–1	3–1
2016–17	UEFA Europa League	Play-off round	(Serbia) Vojvodina	0–0	3–0	3–0
2016–17	UEFA Europa League	Group D	(Republic of Ireland) Dundalk	1–1	1–0	2nd
2016–17	UEFA Europa League	Group D	(Russia) Zenit Saint Petersburg	3–2	0–5	2nd
2016–17	UEFA Europa League	Group D	(Israel) Maccabi Tel Aviv	1–2	0–0	2nd
2016–17	UEFA Europa League	Round of 32	(France) Lyon	1–4	1–7	2–11
2018–19	UEFA Europa League	Second qualifying round	(Kazakhstan) Kairat	2–1	0–2	2–3
2019–20	UEFA Europa League	Second qualifying round	(Sweden) BK Häcken	0–0	3–0	3–0
2019–20	UEFA Europa League	Third qualifying round	(Ukraine) Mariupol	4–0	0–0	4–0
2019–20	UEFA Europa League	Play-off round	(Belgium) Antwerp	1–1	4–1	5–2
2019–20	UEFA Europa League	Group L	(Serbia) Partizan	2–2	2–2	2nd
2019–20	UEFA Europa League	Group L	(England) Manchester United	0–0	0–4	2nd
2019–20	UEFA Europa League	Group L	(Kazakhstan) Astana	6–0	5–0	2nd
2019–20	UEFA Europa League	Round of 32	(Austria) LASK	1–1	0–2	1–3
2020–21	UEFA Champions League	Second qualifying round	(Czech Republic) FC Viktoria Plzeň	3–1	—N/a	3–1
2020–21	UEFA Champions League	Third qualifying round	(Ukraine) FC Dynamo Kyiv	—N/a	0–2	0-2
2020–21	UEFA Europa League	Group F	(Italy) Napoli	1–1	1–0	3rd
2020–21	UEFA Europa League	Group F	(Croatia) Rijeka	4–1	1–2	3rd
2020–21	UEFA Europa League	Group F	(Spain) Real Sociedad	0–0	0–1	3rd
2021–22	UEFA Europa League	Play-off round	(Scotland) Celtic	2–1	0–2	2–3
2021–22	UEFA Europa Conference League	Group D	(Denmark) Randers	1–0	2–2	1st
2021–22	UEFA Europa Conference League	Group D	(Czech Republic) Jablonec	1–0	1–1	1st
2021–22	UEFA Europa Conference League	Group D	(Romania) CFR Cluj	2–0	1–0	1st
2021–22	UEFA Europa Conference League	Round of 16	(Norway) Bodø/Glimt	2–2	1–2	3–4
2022–23	UEFA Europa Conference League	Second qualifying round	(Bosnia and Herzegovina) Tuzla City	1–0	4–0	5–0
2022–23	UEFA Europa Conference League	Third qualifying round	(Scotland) Dundee United	7–0	0–1	7–1
2022–23	UEFA Europa Conference League	Play-off round	(Portugal) Gil Vicente	4–0	2–1	6–1
2022–23	UEFA Europa Conference League	Group E	(Ukraine) Dnipro-1	2–1	1–0	1st
2022–23	UEFA Europa Conference League	Group E	(Liechtenstein) Vaduz	4–1	2–1	1st
2022–23	UEFA Europa Conference League	Group E	(Cyprus) Apollon Limassol	3–2	0–1	1st
2022–23	UEFA Europa Conference League	Round of 16	(Italy) Lazio	2–1	2–1	4–2
2022–23	UEFA Europa Conference League	Quarter-finals	(Belgium) Anderlecht	2–0	0–2	2–2 (4–1 p.)
2022–23	UEFA Europa Conference League	Semi-finals	(England) West Ham United	0–1	1–2	1–3
2023–24	UEFA Europa Conference League	Third qualifying round	(Andorra) FC Santa Coloma	2–0	1–0	3–0
2023–24	UEFA Europa Conference League	Play-off round	(Norway) Brann	1–1	3–3	4–4 (6–5 p.)
2023–24	UEFA Europa Conference League	Group E	(Bosnia and Herzegovina) Zrinjski Mostar	1–0	3–4	3rd
2023–24	UEFA Europa Conference League	Group E	(Poland) Legia Warsaw	1–0	0–2	3rd
2023–24	UEFA Europa Conference League	Group E	(England) Aston Villa	1–4	1–2	3rd
2024–25	UEFA Europa League	League phase	(Sweden) IF Elfsborg	3–2	—N/a	19th
2024–25	UEFA Europa League	League phase	(Spain) Athletic Bilbao	—N/a	0–2	19th
2024–25	UEFA Europa League	League phase	(England) Tottenham Hotspur	—N/a	0–1	19th
2024–25	UEFA Europa League	League phase	(Turkey) Fenerbahçe	3–1	—N/a	19th
2024–25	UEFA Europa League	League phase	(Turkey) Galatasaray	1–1	—N/a	19th
2024–25	UEFA Europa League	League phase	(Bulgaria) Ludogorets Razgrad	—N/a	2–2	19th
2024–25	UEFA Europa League	League phase	(Italy) Roma	1–0	—N/a	19th
2024–25	UEFA Europa League	League phase	(Hungary) Ferencváros	—N/a	3–4	19th
2024–25	UEFA Europa League	Knockout phase play-offs	(Turkey) Galatasaray	4–1	2–2	6–3
2024–25	UEFA Europa League	Round of 16	(England) Tottenham Hotspur	1–0	1–3	2–3
2025–26	UEFA Conference League	Second qualifying round	(Finland) Ilves	5–0	3–4	8–4
2025–26	UEFA Conference League	Third qualifying round	(Liechtenstein) Vaduz	3–0	1–0	4–0
2025–26	UEFA Conference League	Play-off round	(Bulgaria) Levski Sofia	4–1	2–0	6–1
2025–26	UEFA Conference League	League phase	(Cyprus) AEK Larnaca	—N/a	0–4	14th
2025–26	UEFA Conference League	League phase	(Slovakia) Slovan Bratislava	1–0	—N/a	14th
2025–26	UEFA Conference League	League phase	(England) Crystal Palace	—N/a	1–3	14th
2025–26	UEFA Conference League	League phase	(Republic of Ireland) Shelbourne	2–0	—N/a	14th
2025–26	UEFA Conference League	League phase	(Kosovo) Drita	—N/a	3–0	14th
2025–26	UEFA Conference League	League phase	(Poland) Jagiellonia Białystok	0–0	—N/a	14th
2025–26	UEFA Conference League	Knockout phase play-offs	(Armenia) Noah	4–0	0–1	4–1
2025–26	UEFA Conference League	Round of 16	(Czech Republic) Sparta Prague	2–1	4–0	6–1
2025–26	UEFA Conference League	Quarter-finals	(Ukraine) Shakhtar Donetsk	2–2	0–3	2–5

=== UEFA coefficient ranking ===
As of 19 March 2026

Rank	Team	Points
33	(Italy) Napoli	63.000
34	(Greece) Olympiacos	62.250
35	(Netherlands) AZ	61.875
36	(Germany) Leipzig	61.000
37	(Scotland) Rangers	59.250

== Domestic results ==
Below is a table with AZ's domestic results since the introduction of professional football in 1956.

Domestic results since 1956
Domestic league	League result	Qualification to	KNVB Cup season	Cup result
1956–57 Eerste Divisie (as Alkmaar '54)	2nd (group A)	–	1956–57	Third round
1957–58 Eerste Divisie (as Alkmaar '54)	9th (group A)	–	1957–58	Third round
1958–59 Eerste Divisie (as Alkmaar '54)	4th (group A)	–	1958–59	Third round
1959–60 Eerste Divisie (as Alkmaar '54)	1st (group B)	Eredivisie (promotion)	not held	not held
1960–61 Eredivisie (as Alkmaar '54)	17th	Eerste Divisie (relegation)	1960–61	First round
1961–62 Eerste Divisie (as Alkmaar '54)	12th (group A)	Tweede Divisie (relegation)	1961–62	Second round
1962–63 Tweede Divisie (as Alkmaar '54)	4th (group A)	–	1962–63	Semi-finals
1963–64 Tweede Divisie (as Alkmaar '54)	1st (group A); 2nd overall losing play-off	Eerste Divisie (winning promotion tournament)	1963–64	First round
1964–65 Eerste Divisie (as Alkmaar '54); 1964–65 Tweede Divisie (as FC Zaanstreek)	11th 6th (group A)	–	1964–65	First round First round
1965–66 Eerste Divisie (as Alkmaar'54); 1965–66 Tweede Divisie (as FC Zaanstreek)	4th 3rd (group A)	– Eerste Divisie (promotion)	1965–66	Group stage Group stage
1966–67 Eerste Divisie (as Alkmaar '54 and FC Zaanstreek)	12th 7th	–	1966–67	First round First round
1967–68 Eerste Divisie	2nd	Eredivisie (promotion)	1967–68	Group stage
1968–69 Eredivisie	16th	– (after surviving relegation play-offs)	1968–69	Second round
1969–70 Eredivisie	12th	–	1969–70	Quarter-finals
1970–71 Eredivisie	17th	Eerste Divisie (relegation)	1970–71	Second round
1971–72 Eerste Divisie	2nd	Eredivisie (promotion)	1971–72	First round
1972–73 Eredivisie	15th	–	1972–73	Semi-finals
1973–74 Eredivisie	7th	–	1973–74	Quarter-finals
1974–75 Eredivisie	5th	–	1974–75	Quarter-finals
1975–76 Eredivisie	5th	–	1975–76	Quarter-finals
1976–77 Eredivisie	3rd	UEFA Cup	1976–77	Semi-finals
1977–78 Eredivisie	3rd	Cup Winners' Cup	1977–78	Winner
1978–79 Eredivisie	4th	–	1978–79	Quarter-finals
1979–80 Eredivisie	2nd	UEFA Cup	1979–80	Quarter-finals
1980–81 Eredivisie	1st	European Cup	1980–81	Winner
1981–82 Eredivisie	3rd	Cup Winners' Cup	1981–82	Winner
1982–83 Eredivisie	11th	–	1982–83	Second round
1983–84 Eredivisie	6th	–	1983–84	Quarter-finals
1984–85 Eredivisie	13th	–	1984–85	First round
1985–86 Eredivisie	9th	–	1985–86	Second round
1986–87 Eredivisie	15th	–	1986–87	Second round
1987–88 Eredivisie	16th	Eerste Divisie (relegation)	1987–88	First round
1988–89 Eerste Divisie	5th	–	1988–89	Quarter-finals
1989–90 Eerste Divisie	12th	–	1989–90	First round
1990–91 Eerste Divisie	4th	promotion/relegation play-off: no promotion	1990–91	First round
1991–92 Eerste Divisie	13th	–	1991–92	Second round
1992–93 Eerste Divisie	10th	–	1992–93	Third round
1993–94 Eerste Divisie	3rd	promotion/relegation play-off: no promotion	1993–94	Round of 16
1994–95 Eerste Divisie	5th	promotion/relegation play-off: no promotion	1994–95	Round of 16
1995–96 Eerste Divisie	1st	Eredivisie (promotion)	1995–96	Round of 16
1996–97 Eredivisie	18th	Eerste Divisie (relegation)	1996–97	Quarter-finals
1997–98 Eerste Divisie	1st	Eredivisie (promotion)	1997–98	First round (knock-out stage)
1998–99 Eredivisie	9th	–	1998–99	Round of 16
1999–2000 Eredivisie	7th	–	1999–00	Semi-finals
2000–01 Eredivisie	13th	–	2000–01	Quarter-finals
2001–02 Eredivisie	10th	–	2001–02	Second round (knock-out stage)
2002–03 Eredivisie	10th	–	2002–03	Second round (knock-out stage)
2003–04 Eredivisie	5th	UEFA Cup	2003–04	Second round
2004–05 Eredivisie	3rd	UEFA Cup	2004–05	Round of 16
2005–06 Eredivisie	2nd	UEFA Cup (after losing Champions League play-offs)	2005–06	Semi-finals
2006–07 Eredivisie	3rd	UEFA Cup (after losing Champions League play-offs)	2006–07	Final
2007–08 Eredivisie	11th	–	2007–08	Second round
2008–09 Eredivisie	1st	Champions League	2008–09	Quarter-finals
2009–10 Eredivisie	5th	Europa League (Q3)	2009–10	Round of 16
2010–11 Eredivisie	4th	Europa League (Q3)	2010–11	Round of 16
2011–12 Eredivisie	4th	Europa League (Q4)	2011–12	Semi-finals
2012–13 Eredivisie	10th	Europa League	2012–13	Winner
2013–14 Eredivisie	8th	–	2013–14	Semi-finals
2014–15 Eredivisie	3rd	Europa League (Q3)	2014–15	Quarter-finals
2015–16 Eredivisie	4th	Europa League (Q3)	2015–16	Semi-finals
2016–17 Eredivisie	6th	–	2016–17	Final
2017–18 Eredivisie	3rd	Europa League (Q3)	2017–18	Final
2018–19 Eredivisie	4th	Europa League (Q2)	2018–19	Semi-finals
2019–20 Eredivisie	2nd	Champions League (Q2)	2019–20	Quarter-finals
2020–21 Eredivisie	3rd	Europa League (Q4)	2020–21	Round of 16
2021–22 Eredivisie	5th	Europa Conference League (Q2)	2021–22	Semi-finals
2022–23 Eredivisie	4th	Europa Conference League (Q3)	2022–23	Round of 16
2023–24 Eredivisie	4th	Europa League	2023–24	Quarter-finals
2024–25 Eredivisie	5th	Conference League (Q2)	2024–25	Final
2025–26 Eredivisie			2025–26	Winner

== Coaches ==
=== Alkmaar '54 ===
- (Netherlands) Gerrit van Wijhe (1954–1956)
- (Netherlands) Kick Smit (1956–1958)
- (Netherlands) Ludwig Veg (1 July 1958 – 30 June 1960)
- (Netherlands) Piet de Wolf (1960–1961)
- (Netherlands) Bonnie Bult (1961–1962)
- (Netherlands) Arie Rentenaar (1962–1963)
- (Netherlands) Ludwig Veg (1 July 1963 – 30 June 1965)
- (Wales) Barry Hughes (1 July 1965 – 30 June 1967)

=== KFC / FC Zaanstreek ===
- (England) Bob Kelly (1955–1956)
- (Netherlands) Wim Blokland (1956–1958)
- (Netherlands) Klaas Molenaar (1958–1960)
- (Netherlands) Toon Bruins Slot (1960–1963)
- (Netherlands) Joop de Kubber (1963–1964)
- (Netherlands) Piet de Wolf (1964–1965)
- (Netherlands) Toon van den Enden (1965–1966)

=== AZ '67 ===
- (England) Lesley Talbot (1 July 1967 – 30 June 1968)
- (Netherlands) Wim Blokland (1968–1969)
- (Netherlands) Robert Heinz (1969–1971)
- (Netherlands) Cor van der Hart (1 July 1971 – 30 June 1973)
- (Netherlands) Joop Brand (1 July 1973 – 30 June 1976)
- (Netherlands) Hans Kraay Sr. (1 July 1976 – 30 June 1977)
- (Netherlands) Jan Notermans (1977)
- (Netherlands) Cor van der Hart (1 July 1977 – 30 June 1978)
- (West Germany) Georg Keßler (1 July 1978 – 30 June 1982)
- (Netherlands) Hans Eijkenbroek (1 July 1982 – 30 June 1983)
- (Netherlands) Piet de Visser (1 July 1983 – 30 June 1985)
- (Netherlands) Joop Brand (1 July 1985 – 30 June 1986)
- (Netherlands) Han Berger (1 July 1986 – 31 December 1986)

=== AZ ===
- (Netherlands) Hans Eijkenbroek (1987 – 30 June 1989)
- (Netherlands) Hans van Doorneveld (1 July 1989 – 30 June 1990)
- (Netherlands) Henk Wullems (1 July 1990 – 30 June 1993)
- (Netherlands) Piet Schrijvers (1 July 1993 – 30 June 1994)
- (Netherlands) Theo Vonk (1 July 1994 – 28 February 1997)
- (Netherlands) Hans de Koning (interim) (28 February 1997 – 30 June 1997)
- (Netherlands) Willem van Hanegem (1 July 1997 – 30 June 1999)
- (Netherlands) Gerard van der Lem (1 July 1999 – 30 March 2000)
- (Netherlands) Henk van Stee (31 March 2000 – 30 October 2002)
- (Netherlands) Co Adriaanse (30 October 2002 – 30 June 2005)
- (Netherlands) Louis van Gaal (1 July 2005 – 30 June 2009)
- (Netherlands) Ronald Koeman (1 July 2009 – 5 December 2009)
- (Netherlands) Martin Haar (interim) (5 December 2009 – 10 December 2009)
- (Netherlands) Dick Advocaat (10 December 2009 – 30 June 2010)
- (Netherlands) Gertjan Verbeek (1 July 2010 – 29 September 2013)
- (Netherlands) Martin Haar (interim) (29 September 2013 – 15 October 2013)
- (Netherlands) Dick Advocaat (15 October 2013 – 30 June 2014)
- (Netherlands) Marco van Basten (30 June 2014 – 16 September 2014)
- (Netherlands) John van den Brom (29 September 2014 – 30 June 2019)
- (Netherlands) Arne Slot (1 July 2019 – 5 December 2020)
- (Netherlands) Pascal Jansen (5 December 2020 – 17 January 2024)
- (Belgium) Maarten Martens (17 January 2024 – 18 January 2026)
- (Netherlands) Lee-Roy Echteld (interim) (18 January 2026 –
