= Marklew =

Marklew is a surname. Notable people with the surname include:

- Ernest Marklew (1874–1939), British politician
- Roger Marklew (1940–2006), English footballer
