= Terry Murphy =

Terry Murphy may refer to:

- Terry Murphy (broadcaster) (born 1948), American television host and correspondent
- Terry Murphy (artist) (born 1956), Australian artist
- Terry Murphy (snooker player) (born 1972), Northern Irish snooker player
- Terry Murphy (American politician) (born 1942/1943), Republican member of Montana Legislature
- Terry Murphy (footballer) (born 1940), English footballer
- Terry Murphy (rugby league) (born 1952), Australian former rugby league footballer
- Terrence Murphy (Canadian politician) (1926–2008), known as Terry, Canadian lawyer, politician and judge

== See also ==
- Terrence Murphy (disambiguation)
