= 1939–40 Football League =

Abandoned season of the Football League

The Football League
- Season: 1939–40
- Champions: N/A (season abandoned)

The 1939–40 season would have been the 48th season of The Football League. The kick-off in all divisions took place on Saturday, 26 August 1939. The season was abandoned after only three matches due to the outbreak of the Second World War. The FA Cup would not resume until 1945-46, and the Football League only restarted in the 1946-47 season.

Blackpool were leading the First Division when the season was abandoned.

On 1 September 1939, Germany invaded Poland. On the next day, all divisions of the Football League played their third game of the season. These were the last fixtures before the leagues were abandoned following the British declaration of war on Germany on 3 September 1939.

Large gatherings of crowds were suspended with the implementation of the Emergency Powers (Defence) Act 1939.

== League tables when season was abandoned ==
The tables below are reproduced here in the exact form that they can be found at The Rec.Sport.Soccer Statistics Foundation website and in Rothmans Book of Football League Records 1888–89 to 1978–79, with home and away statistics separated.

Match results are drawn from Rothmans for all divisions.

== First Division ==
First Division
- Season: 1939–40
- Matches: 33
- Goals: 83 (2.52 per match)
- Top goalscorer: Ted Drake; Tommy Lawton (4 goals)
- Biggest home win: Manchester United 4–0 Grimsby Town (26 August 1939); Stoke City 4–0 Charlton Athletic (26 Aug 1939)
- Biggest away win: Aston Villa 1–2 Everton (28 August 1939); Stoke City 1–2 Bolton Wanderers (28 August 1939); Sunderland 1–2 Huddersfield Town (30 August 1939); 0–1: three matches
- Highest scoring: Arsenal 5–2 Sunderland (2 September 1939)

| Pos | Team | Pld | W | D | L | GF | GA | GAv | Pts | Relegation |
|---|---|---|---|---|---|---|---|---|---|---|
| 1 | Blackpool | 3 | 3 | 0 | 0 | 5 | 2 | 2.500 | 6 | |
| 2 | Sheffield United | 3 | 2 | 1 | 0 | 3 | 1 | 3.000 | 5 | |
| 3 | Arsenal | 3 | 2 | 1 | 0 | 8 | 4 | 2.000 | 5 | |
| 4 | Liverpool | 3 | 2 | 0 | 1 | 6 | 3 | 2.000 | 4 | |
| 5 | Everton | 3 | 1 | 2 | 0 | 5 | 4 | 1.250 | 4 | |
| 6 | Bolton Wanderers | 3 | 2 | 0 | 1 | 6 | 5 | 1.200 | 4 | |
| 7 | Derby County | 3 | 2 | 0 | 1 | 3 | 3 | 1.000 | 4 | |
| 8 | Charlton Athletic | 3 | 2 | 0 | 1 | 3 | 4 | 0.750 | 4 | |
| 9 | Stoke City | 3 | 1 | 1 | 1 | 7 | 4 | 1.750 | 3 | |
| 10 | Manchester United | 3 | 1 | 1 | 1 | 5 | 3 | 1.667 | 3 | |
| 11 | Brentford | 3 | 1 | 1 | 1 | 3 | 3 | 1.000 | 3 | |
| 12 | Chelsea | 3 | 1 | 1 | 1 | 4 | 4 | 1.000 | 3 | |
| 13 | Grimsby Town | 3 | 1 | 1 | 1 | 2 | 4 | 0.500 | 3 | |
| 14 | Aston Villa | 3 | 1 | 0 | 2 | 3 | 3 | 1.000 | 2 | |
| 15 | Sunderland | 3 | 1 | 0 | 2 | 6 | 7 | 0.857 | 2 | |
| 16 | Wolverhampton Wanderers | 3 | 0 | 2 | 1 | 3 | 4 | 0.750 | 2 | |
| 17 | Huddersfield Town | 3 | 1 | 0 | 2 | 2 | 3 | 0.667 | 2 | |
| 18 | Portsmouth | 3 | 1 | 0 | 2 | 3 | 5 | 0.600 | 2 | |
| 19 | Preston North End | 3 | 0 | 2 | 1 | 0 | 2 | 0.000 | 2 | |
| 20 | Blackburn Rovers | 3 | 0 | 1 | 2 | 3 | 5 | 0.600 | 1 | |
| 21 | Middlesbrough | 3 | 0 | 1 | 2 | 3 | 8 | 0.375 | 1 | Reprieved from relegation (Note: There was no relegation as the season was abandoned due to the outbreak of World War II.) |
| 22 | Leeds United | 3 | 0 | 1 | 2 | 0 | 2 | 0.000 | 1 | Reprieved from relegation |

Rules for classification: 1) Points; 2) Goal average; 3) Goals scored

=== Results ===
| Home \ Away | ARS | AST | BLB | BLP | BOL | BRE | CHA | CHE | DER | EVE | GRI | HUD | LEE | LIV | MUN | MID | POR | PNE | SHU | STK | SUN | WOL |
|---|---|---|---|---|---|---|---|---|---|---|---|---|---|---|---|---|---|---|---|---|---|---|
| Arsenal | | | 1–0 | | | | | | | | | | | | | | | | | | 5–2 | |
| Aston Villa | | | | | | | | | | 1–2 | | | | | | 2–0 | | | | | | |
| Blackburn Rovers | | | | | | | | | | 2–2 | | | | | | | | | | | | |
| Blackpool | | | | | | 2–1 | | | | | | | | | | | | | | | | 2–1 |
| Bolton Wanderers | | | | | | | | | | | | | | | | | 2–1 | | | | | |
| Brentford | | | | | | | | | | | | 1–0 | | | | | | | | | | |
| Charlton Athletic | | | | | | | | | | | | | | | 2–0 | | | | | | | |
| Chelsea | | | | | 3–2 | | | | | | | | | | 1–1 | | | | | | | |
| Derby County | | 1–0 | | | | | | | | | | | | | | | 2–0 | | | | | |
| Everton | | | | | | 1–1 | | | | | | | | | | | | | | | | |
| Grimsby Town | | | | | | | | | | | | | | | | | | 2–0 | | | | 0–0 |
| Huddersfield Town | | | | 0–1 | | | | | | | | | | | | | | | | | | |
| Leeds United | | | | | | | 0–1 | | | | | | | | | | | | 0–1 | | | |
| Liverpool | | | | | | | | 1–0 | | | | | | | | 4–1 | | | | | | |
| Manchester United | | | | | | | | | | | 4–0 | | | | | | | | | | | |
| Middlesbrough | | | | | | | | | | | | | | | | | | | | 2–2 | | |
| Portsmouth | | | 2–1 | | | | | | | | | | | | | | | | | | | |
| Preston North End | | | | | | | | | | | | | 0–0 | | | | | | 0–0 | | | |
| Sheffield United | | | | | | | | | | | | | | 2–1 | | | | | | | | |
| Stoke City | | | | | 1–2 | | 4–0 | | | | | | | | | | | | | | | |
| Sunderland | | | | | | | | | 3–0 | | | 1–2 | | | | | | | | | | |
| Wolverhampton Wanderers | 2–2 | | | | | | | | | | | | | | | | | | | | | |

Source: Ian Laschke: Rothmans Book of Football League Records 1888–89 to 1978–79. Macdonald and Jane’s, London & Sydney, 1980.
Legend: Blue = home team win; Yellow = draw; Red = away team win.

=== Maps ===
Locations of the Football League First Division teams
Locations of the Football League First Division London teams

== Second Division ==
Second Division
- Season: 1939–40
- Matches: 32
- Goals: 102 (3.19 per match)
- Biggest home win: Newcastle United 8–1 Swansea Town (2 September 1939)
- Biggest away win: Bradford Park Avenue 0–3 Luton Town (30 August 1939)
- Highest scoring: Newcastle United 8–1 Swansea Town (2 September 1939)

| Pos | Team | Pld | W | D | L | GF | GA | GAv | Pts | Promotion or relegation |
|---|---|---|---|---|---|---|---|---|---|---|
| 1 | Luton Town | 3 | 2 | 1 | 0 | 7 | 1 | 7.000 | 5 | No promotion (Note: There was no promotion or relegation as the season was abandoned due to the outbreak of World War II.) |
| 2 | Birmingham | 3 | 2 | 1 | 0 | 5 | 1 | 5.000 | 5 | No promotion |
| 3 | Leicester City | 3 | 2 | 0 | 1 | 6 | 5 | 1.200 | 4 | |
| 4 | Plymouth Argyle | 3 | 2 | 0 | 1 | 4 | 3 | 1.333 | 4 | |
| 5 | Coventry City | 3 | 1 | 2 | 0 | 8 | 6 | 1.333 | 4 | |
| 6 | West Ham United | 3 | 2 | 0 | 1 | 5 | 4 | 1.250 | 4 | |
| 7 | Tottenham Hotspur | 3 | 1 | 2 | 0 | 6 | 5 | 1.200 | 4 | |
| 8 | Nottingham Forest | 3 | 2 | 0 | 1 | 5 | 5 | 1.000 | 4 | |
| 9 | Manchester City | 3 | 1 | 1 | 1 | 6 | 5 | 1.200 | 3 | |
| 10 | Millwall | 3 | 1 | 1 | 1 | 5 | 4 | 1.250 | 3 | |
| 11 | Newport County | 3 | 1 | 1 | 1 | 5 | 4 | 1.250 | 3 | |
| 12 | West Bromwich Albion | 3 | 1 | 1 | 1 | 8 | 8 | 1.000 | 3 | |
| 13 | Bury | 3 | 1 | 1 | 1 | 4 | 5 | 0.800 | 3 | |
| 14 | Newcastle United | 3 | 1 | 0 | 2 | 8 | 6 | 1.333 | 2 | |
| 15 | Chesterfield | 2 | 1 | 0 | 1 | 2 | 2 | 1.000 | 2 | |
| 16 | Barnsley | 3 | 1 | 0 | 2 | 7 | 8 | 0.875 | 2 | |
| 17 | Southampton | 3 | 1 | 0 | 2 | 5 | 6 | 0.833 | 2 | |
| 18 | Sheffield Wednesday | 3 | 1 | 0 | 2 | 3 | 5 | 0.600 | 2 | |
| 19 | Swansea Town | 3 | 1 | 0 | 2 | 5 | 11 | 0.455 | 2 | |
| 20 | Fulham | 3 | 0 | 1 | 2 | 3 | 6 | 0.500 | 1 | |
| 21 | Burnley | 2 | 0 | 1 | 1 | 1 | 3 | 0.333 | 1 | Reprived from relegation |
| 22 | Bradford (Park Avenue) | 3 | 0 | 1 | 2 | 2 | 7 | 0.286 | 1 | Reprived from relegation |

Rules for classification: 1) Points; 2) Goal average; 3) Goals scored

=== Results ===
| Home \ Away | BAR | BIR | BPA | BUR | BRY | CHF | COV | FUL | LEI | LUT | MCI | MIL | NEW | NPC | NOT | PLY | SHW | SOU | SWA | TOT | WBA | WHU |
|---|---|---|---|---|---|---|---|---|---|---|---|---|---|---|---|---|---|---|---|---|---|---|
| Barnsley | | | | | | | | | | | | | | | 4–1 | | | | | | | |
| Birmingham | | | | 2–0 | | | | | 2–0 | | | | | | | | | | | | | |
| Bradford Park Avenue | | | | | | | | | | 0–3 | | 2–2 | | | | | | | | | | |
| Burnley | | | | | | | 1–1 | | | | | | | | | | | | | | | |
| Bury | | | | | | | | 3–1 | | | | | | | | | | | | | | |
| Chesterfield | | | 2–0 | | | | | | | | | | | | | | | | | | | |
| Coventry City | 4–2 | | | | | | | | | | | | | | | | | | | | 3–3 | |
| Fulham | | | | | | | | | | 1–1 | | | | | | | | | | | | |
| Leicester City | | | | | | | | | | | 4–3 | | | | | | | | | | | |
| Luton Town | | | | | | | | | | | | | | | | | 3–0 | | | | | |
| Manchester City | | | | | 1–1 | 2–0 | | | | | | | | | | | | | | | | |
| Millwall | | | | | | | | | | | | | 3–0 | | | 0–2 | | | | | | |
| Newcastle United | | | | | | | | | | | | | | | | | | | 8–1 | | | |
| Newport County | | | | | | | | | | | | | | | | | | 3–1 | | 1–1 | | |
| Nottingham Forest | | | | | | | | | | | | | 2–0 | 2–1 | | | | | | | | |
| Plymouth Argyle | | | | | | | | | | | | | | | | | | | | | | 1–3 |
| Sheffield Wednesday | 3–1 | | | | | | | | | | | | | | | 0–1 | | | | | | |
| Southampton | | | | | 3–0 | | | | | | | | | | | | | | 1–3 | | | |
| Swansea Town | | | | | | | | | | | | | | | | | | | | | 1–2 | |
| Tottenham Hotspur | | 1–1 | | | | | | | | | | | | | | | | | | | | |
| West Bromwich Albion | | | | | | | | | | | | | | | | | | | | 3–4 | | |
| West Ham United | | | | | | | | 2–1 | 0–2 | | | | | | | | | | | | | |

Source: Ian Laschke: Rothmans Book of Football League Records 1888–89 to 1978–79. Macdonald and Jane’s, London & Sydney, 1980.
Legend: Blue = home team win; Yellow = draw; Red = away team win.

=== Maps ===
Locations of the Football League Second Division teams
Locations of the Football League Second Division London teams

== Third Division North ==
Football League Third Division North
- Season: 1939–40
- Matches: 31
- Goals: 87 (2.81 per match)

| Pos | Team | Pld | W | D | L | GF | GA | GAv | Pts | Qualification |
|---|---|---|---|---|---|---|---|---|---|---|
| 1 | Accrington Stanley | 3 | 3 | 0 | 0 | 6 | 1 | 6.000 | 6 | No promotion (Note: There was no promotion or re-election as the season was abandoned due to the outbreak of World War II.) |
| 2 | Halifax Town | 3 | 2 | 1 | 0 | 6 | 1 | 6.000 | 5 | |
| 3 | Chester | 3 | 2 | 1 | 0 | 5 | 2 | 2.500 | 5 | |
| 3 | Darlington | 3 | 2 | 1 | 0 | 5 | 2 | 2.500 | 5 | |
| 5 | New Brighton | 3 | 2 | 0 | 1 | 6 | 5 | 1.200 | 4 | |
| 6 | Rochdale | 3 | 2 | 0 | 1 | 2 | 2 | 1.000 | 4 | |
| 7 | Crewe Alexandra | 2 | 1 | 1 | 0 | 3 | 0 | — | 3 | |
| 8 | Wrexham | 3 | 1 | 1 | 1 | 3 | 2 | 1.500 | 3 | |
| 9 | Tranmere Rovers | 3 | 1 | 1 | 1 | 6 | 6 | 1.000 | 3 | |
| 10 | Lincoln City | 3 | 1 | 1 | 1 | 6 | 7 | 0.857 | 3 | |
| 11 | Rotherham United | 3 | 1 | 1 | 1 | 5 | 6 | 0.833 | 3 | |
| 12 | Carlisle United | 2 | 1 | 0 | 1 | 3 | 3 | 1.000 | 2 | |
| 13 | Hull City | 2 | 0 | 2 | 0 | 3 | 3 | 1.000 | 2 | |
| 14 | Gateshead | 3 | 1 | 0 | 2 | 6 | 7 | 0.857 | 2 | |
| 15 | Doncaster Rovers | 3 | 1 | 0 | 2 | 4 | 5 | 0.800 | 2 | |
| 16 | Barrow | 3 | 0 | 2 | 1 | 4 | 5 | 0.800 | 2 | |
| 16 | Southport | 3 | 0 | 2 | 1 | 4 | 5 | 0.800 | 2 | |
| 18 | Oldham Athletic | 3 | 1 | 0 | 2 | 3 | 5 | 0.600 | 2 | |
| 19 | Hartlepools United | 3 | 0 | 2 | 1 | 1 | 4 | 0.250 | 2 | |
| 20 | York City | 3 | 0 | 1 | 2 | 3 | 5 | 0.600 | 1 | |
| 21 | Bradford City | 3 | 0 | 1 | 2 | 3 | 6 | 0.500 | 1 | Reprived from re-election |
| 22 | Stockport County | 2 | 0 | 0 | 2 | 0 | 5 | 0.000 | 0 | Reprived from re-election |

Source: Football League Division 3 (North) Table 1939/40

=== Results ===
| Home \ Away | ACC | BRW | BRA | CRL | CHE | CRE | DAR | DON | GAT | HAL | HAR | HUL | LIN | NWB | OLD | ROC | ROT | SOU | STP | TRA | WRE | YOR |
|---|---|---|---|---|---|---|---|---|---|---|---|---|---|---|---|---|---|---|---|---|---|---|
| Accrington Stanley | | | | | | | | | | | | | | | 2–0 | | | | | | | |
| Barrow | 1–2 | | 2–2 | | | | | | | | | | | | | | | | | | | |
| Bradford City | 0–2 | | | | | | | | | | | | | | | | | | | | | |
| Carlisle United | | | | | | | | | | | | | | | | | | | 2–0 | | | |
| Chester | | | | | | | | 1–0 | | | | | | | | | | | | 2–0 | | |
| Crewe Alexandra | | | | | | | | | | | 0–0 | | | | | | | | | | | |
| Darlington | | | | | | | | | | | | | | | | | | 1–0 | | | | |
| Doncaster Rovers | | | | | | | | | | | | | | | | 2–0 | | | | | | |
| Gateshead | | | | | | 0–3 | | | | | 3–0 | | | | | | | | | | | |
| Halifax Town | | | | | | | | | | | | | | | 2–0 | | | | | | 1–1 | |
| Hartlepool | | 1–1 | | | | | | | | | | | | | | | | | | | | |
| Hull City | | | | | | | | | | | | | 2–2 | | | | | | | | | |
| Lincoln City | | | | | | | 0–2 | | 4–3 | | | | | | | | | | | | | |
| New Brighton | | | 2–1 | | | | | 4–2 | | | | | | | | | | | | | | |
| Oldham Athletic | | | | 3–1 | | | | | | | | | | | | | | | | | | |
| Rochdale | | | | | | | | | | | | | | | | | | | | | 1–0 | 1–0 |
| Rotherham United | | | | | | | 2–2 | | | | | | | | | | | | | | | 2–1 |
| Southport | | | | | | | | | | | | 1–1 | | | | | | | | 3–3 | | |
| Stockport County | | | | | | | | | | 0–3 | | | | | | | | | | | | |
| Tranmere | | | | | | | | | | | | | | | | | 3–1 | | | | | |
| Wrexham | | | | | | | | | | | | | | 2–0 | | | | | | | | |
| York City | | | | | 2–2 | | | | | | | | | | | | | | | | | |

Source: Ian Laschke: Rothmans Book of Football League Records 1888–89 to 1978–79. Macdonald and Jane’s, London & Sydney, 1980.
Legend: Blue = home team win; Yellow = draw; Red = away team win.

=== Maps ===
Locations of the Football League Third Division North teams

== Third Division South ==
Football League Third Division South
- Season: 1939–40
- Matches: 32
- Goals: 102 (3.19 per match)

| Pos | Team | Pld | W | D | L | GF | GA | GAv | Pts | Qualification |
|---|---|---|---|---|---|---|---|---|---|---|
| 1 | Reading | 3 | 2 | 1 | 0 | 8 | 2 | 4.000 | 5 | No promotion (Note: There was no promotion or re-election as the season was abandoned due to the outbreak of World War II.) |
| 2 | Exeter City | 3 | 2 | 1 | 0 | 5 | 3 | 1.667 | 5 | |
| 3 | Notts County | 2 | 2 | 0 | 0 | 6 | 3 | 2.000 | 4 | |
| 4 | Ipswich Town | 3 | 1 | 2 | 0 | 5 | 3 | 1.667 | 4 | |
| 5 | Brighton & Hove Albion | 3 | 1 | 2 | 0 | 5 | 4 | 1.250 | 4 | |
| 6 | Cardiff City | 3 | 2 | 0 | 1 | 5 | 5 | 1.000 | 4 | |
| 7 | Crystal Palace | 3 | 2 | 0 | 1 | 8 | 9 | 0.889 | 4 | |
| 8 | Bournemouth & Boscombe Athletic | 3 | 1 | 1 | 1 | 13 | 4 | 3.250 | 3 | |
| 9 | Mansfield Town | 3 | 1 | 1 | 1 | 8 | 8 | 1.000 | 3 | |
| 10 | Bristol City | 3 | 1 | 1 | 1 | 5 | 5 | 1.000 | 3 | |
| 11 | Norwich City | 3 | 1 | 1 | 1 | 4 | 4 | 1.000 | 3 | |
| 12 | Torquay United | 3 | 0 | 3 | 0 | 4 | 4 | 1.000 | 3 | |
| 13 | Clapton Orient | 3 | 2 | 0 | 1 | 8 | 9 | 0.889 | 4 | |
| 14 | Southend United | 3 | 1 | 1 | 1 | 3 | 3 | 1.000 | 3 | |
| 15 | Walsall | 3 | 1 | 1 | 1 | 3 | 3 | 1.000 | 3 | |
| 16 | Queens Park Rangers | 3 | 0 | 2 | 1 | 4 | 5 | 0.800 | 2 | |
| 16 | Watford | 3 | 0 | 2 | 1 | 4 | 5 | 0.800 | 2 | |
| 18 | Northampton Town | 3 | 1 | 0 | 2 | 2 | 12 | 0.167 | 2 | |
| 19 | Aldershot | 3 | 0 | 1 | 2 | 3 | 5 | 0.600 | 1 | |
| 20 | Swindon Town | 3 | 0 | 1 | 2 | 2 | 4 | 0.500 | 1 | |
| 21 | Bristol Rovers | 3 | 0 | 1 | 2 | 2 | 7 | 0.286 | 1 | Reprived from re-election |
| 22 | Port Vale | 2 | 0 | 1 | 1 | 0 | 1 | 0.000 | 1 | Reprived from re-election |

=== Results ===
| Home \ Away | REA | EXE | NTC | IPS | B&HA | CAR | CRY | B&BA | MAN | BRI | NWC | TOR | CLA | STD | WAL | QPR | WAT | NOR | ALD | SWI | BRR | PTV |
|---|---|---|---|---|---|---|---|---|---|---|---|---|---|---|---|---|---|---|---|---|---|---|
| Reading | | | | | | | 5–0 | | | | | | | 1–0 | | | | | | | | |
| Exeter City | | | | | | | | | | | | 2–2 | | | | | | | | | | |
| Notts County | | | | | | | | 2–1 | | | | | | | | | | | | | | |
| Ipswich Town | | | | | | | | | | | 1–1 | | | | | | | | | | 2–0 | |
| Brighton & Hove Albion | | | | | | | | | | | | | | | | | | | 2–1 | | | 0–0 |
| Cardiff City | | | 2–4 | | | | | | | | | | | | | | | | | | | |
| Crystal Palace | | | | | | | | | | | | | | | | | | | | | 3–0 | |
| Bournemouth & Boscombe Athletic | | | | | | | | | | | | | | | | 2–2 | | 10–0 | | | | |
| Mansfield Town | | | | | | | 4–5 | | | | | | | | | | | | | | | |
| Bristol City | | | | | 3–3 | | | | | | 1–2 | | | | | | | | | | | |
| Norwich City | | | | | | 1–2 | | | | | | | | | | | | | | | | |
| Torquay United | | | | | | | | | 2–2 | | | | | | 0–0 | | | | | | | |
| Clapton Orient | | | | 2–2 | | | | | | | | | | 0–0 | | | | | | | | |
| Southend | | | | | | | | | | | | | | | 3–2 | | | | | | | |
| Walsall | | | | | | | | | | | | | | | | 1–0 | | | | | | |
| Queens Park Rangers | | | | | | | | | | | | | | | | | 2–2 | | | | | |
| Watford | | | | | | | | | 1–2 | | | | 1–1 | | | | | | | | | |
| Northampton Town | | 1–2 | | | | | | | | | | | | | | | | | | 1–0 | | |
| Aldershot | | | | | | | | | | 0–1 | | | | | | | | | | | | |
| Swindon Town | | | | | | 0–1 | | | | | | | | | | | | | 2–2 | | | |
| Bristol Rovers | 2–2 | | | | | | | | | | | | | | | | | | | | | |
| Port Vale | | 0–1 | | | | | | | | | | | | | | | | | | | | |

Updated to match(es) played on unknown. Source: Ian Laschke: Rothmans Book of Football League Records 1888–89 to 1978–79. Macdonald and Jane’s, London & Sydney, 1980.
Legend: Blue = home team win; Yellow = draw; Red = away team win.

=== Maps ===
Locations of the Football League Third Division South teams
Locations of the Football League Third Division South London teams

== See also ==
- 1939-40 in English football
- 1939 in association football
- 1940 in association football
