= Martin Haar =

Dutch former football defender

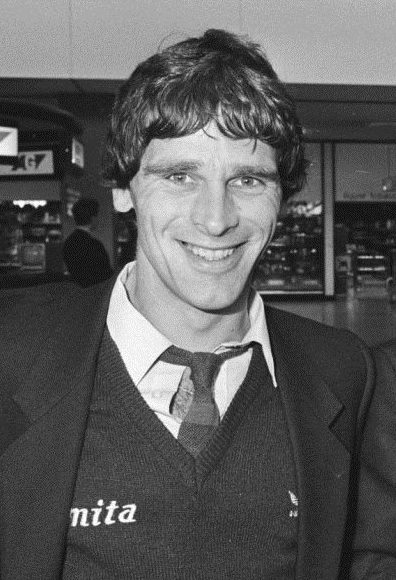
- Martin Haar in 1982

Personal information
- Date of birth: 2 May 1952 (age 74)
- Place of birth: Zwolle, Netherlands
- Position: Defender

Team information
- Current team: Jong AZ (assistant coach)

Senior career*
Years	Team	Apps	(Gls)
1968–1969	PEC Zwolle	1	(1)
1971–1977	Go Ahead Eagles	68	(10)
1973–1974	→ De Graafschap (loan)	13	(2)
1977–1983	Haarlem	185	(18)
1983–1986	AZ '67	89	(7)
1986–1987	Haarlem	37	(2)
1988	Sparta	21	(0)
1989	Wageningen	18	(0)
Total		432	(40)

Managerial career
- 1997: AZ (caretaker)
- 1999–2000: BSV Juniors (director of football)
- 2000: BSV Juniors
- 2001–2014: AZ (assistant)
- 2009: AZ (caretaker)
- 2013: AZ (caretaker)
- 2015–2018: Jong AZ
- 2019–2020: RKVV Velsen
- 2021–: Jong AZ (assistant)
- * Club domestic league appearances and goals

Martin Haar (born 2 May 1952) is a Dutch football coach and a former defender. He is an assistant coach with Jong AZ.

== Playing career ==
=== Club ===
Haar was born in Zwolle, Overijssel. He played for Go Ahead Eagles (1971–1977), Haarlem (1977–1983), AZ '67 (1983–1986), Haarlem (1986–1988), Sparta (1988–1989) and FC Wageningen (1989). He was a member of the famous Haarlem team, that competed in the UEFA Cup in the 1982–83 season, for the first time in the club's history. He captained the team in the match away at Moscow Spartak which became infamous as the Luzhniki disaster.(Report) He was crowned best Eredivisie player in 1982.

=== International ===
Haar played for the Netherlands Olympic football team during qualification for the 1984 Summer Olympics.

== Managerial career ==
Haar managed BSV Bad Bleiberg to the league title in Austria's third tier before returning to AZ in 2000 to take care of the club's U19 team. He and his son Dennis were named caretaker managers of AZ in 2013 after Gertjan Verbeek was sacked. Living in Velserbroek, he retired after 24 years with AZ in 2019 and took charge of local amateur side RKVV Velsen.
