= Hans Eijkenbroek =

Dutch footballer and manager (1940–2024)

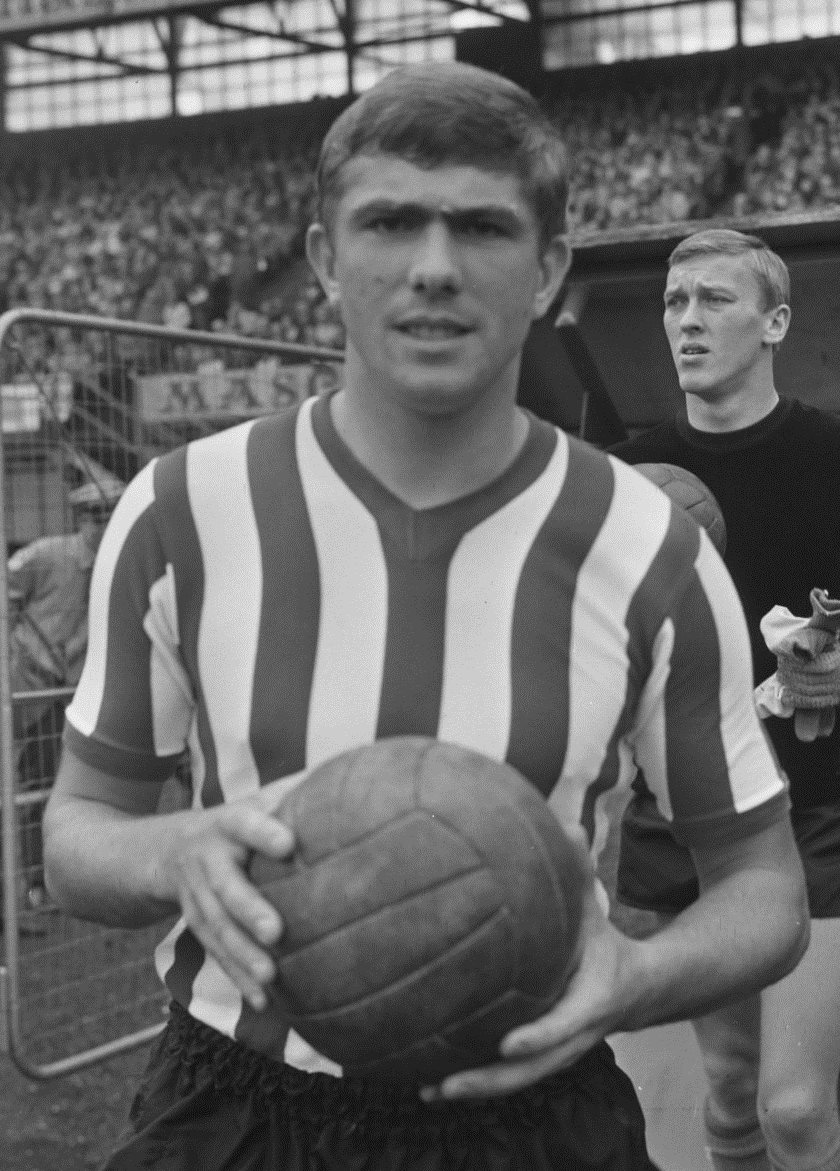
- Eijkenbroek in 1965

Personal information
- Full name: Johannes Antonius Eijkenbroek
- Date of birth: 5 January 1940
- Place of birth: Schiedam, Netherlands
- Date of death: 17 August 2024 (aged 84)
- Place of death: Dirkshorn, Netherlands
- Height: 1.83 m (6 ft 0 in)
- Position: Midfielder

Senior career*
Years	Team	Apps	(Gls)
1957–1963	Hermes DVS	157	(10)
1963–1973	Sparta	299	(13)
1973–1975	Willem II	40	(4)
Total		496	(27)

International career
1967–1970	Netherlands	18	(0)

Managerial career
- 1982–1983: AZ '67
- 1983–1984: Roda JC
- 1987–1989: AZ
- 1989–1990: Haarlem
- * Club domestic league appearances and goals

Johannes Antonius Eijkenbroek (5 January 1940 – 17 August 2024) was a Dutch football player and manager.

== Playing career ==
=== Club ===
Born in Schiedam, he started his career at local side Hermes DVS and was scouted by Sparta Rotterdam legend Denis Neville in 1962. With Sparta he played in two KNVB Cup Finals, winning one. He was Sparta captain when goalkeeper Eddy Treijtel shot down a gull from a goal-kick during a derby match against Feyenoord in 1970. Eijkenbroek subsequently threw the bird off the pitch only for a Sparta employee to have it stuffed and put in either Sparta's or Feyenoord's club museum.

Nicknamed De Eijk, he also played for Willem II.

=== International ===
Eijkenbroek made his debut for the Netherlands in an April 1967 friendly match against Belgium and earned a total of 18 caps, scoring no goals. He skippered the Oranje 12 times. His final international was a January 1970 friendly against England.

== Managerial career ==
Eijkenbroek played under manager Georg Keßler at Sparta and the national team, and later became his assistant at AZ '67, before taking the reins himself. He also managed Haarlem and Roda JC, where he was dismissed in November 1984. Between 1995 and 2013 he was part of the technical staff at FC Dordrecht, and he later stayed at the club as a volunteer, cleaning the toilets and dressing rooms.

== Death ==
Eijkenbroek died on 17 August 2024, at the age of 84.
