= Lee-Roy Echteld =

Dutch football manager (born 1968)

Personal information
- Date of birth: 30 September 1968 (age 58)
- Place of birth: Amsterdam, Netherlands
- Position: Midfielder

Team information
- Current team: AZ (caretaker)

Youth career
- 1981–198?: Ajax
- 198?–1988: DWS

Senior career*
Years	Team	Apps	(Gls)
1988–1992	Haarlem	70	(6)
1992–1997	Heerenveen	151	(21)
1997–1998	Cannes	5	(0)
1998	AZ	11	(2)
1998–1999	RKC	27	(3)
1999–2001	Austria Lustenau	20	(0)
2000–2001	→ Heracles (loan)	8	(0)
Total		292	(32)

Managerial career
- 2009–2011: Blauw-Wit
- 2013: DVW
- 2015: Zeeburgia
- 2018–2019: Paris Saint-Germain B
- 2022–2024: De Treffers
- 2023–: Netherlands U21 (assistant)
- 2024–2026: Jong AZ
- 2026–: AZ
- * Club domestic league appearances and goals

Lee-Roy Echteld (born 30 September 1968) is a Dutch professional football manager and former player who is the manager of Eredivisie club AZ. He most notably played for Heerenveen as a midfielder.

== Playing career ==
Echteld started playing football in youth departments of Ajax and DWS in Amsterdam. He broke through to senior football in 1988 at HFC Haarlem and then played for Heerenveen during a five-year spell. He also played briefly abroad with the French Ligue 1 club Cannes and the Austrian club Austria Lustenau. In 2001, he retired from football at Heracles.

Echteld also played with the Suriprofs, where he was allowed to participate because of his Surinamese descent. Because his father is of Chinese Surinamese descent, and this was also clearly visible when Echteld was a baby, the Chinese name 'Lee' was added with a dash before 'Roy', which his parents originally wanted to call him.

== Managerial career ==
Echteld became a coach after his playing career and began managing the amateur branch of Omniworld. He did an internship at Ajax for the KNVB diploma. In the 2006–07 season, he was a youth coach at DoCoS. From 2007, he became active at Blauw-Wit Amsterdam, first as a youth coach, and then in 2009 as head coach. He then took over as manager of DWV in January 2013. In 2014, he started working as a youth coach at AZ. He took over as manager of Zeeburgia in January 2015, but left that position at the end of 2015, when he was appointed as assistant coach of AZ's first team, where he succeeded Marco van Basten in that position. In the summer of 2018, Echteld left for Paris Saint-Germain to become manager of the reserve team competing in the Championnat National 2. In 2019, however, PSG decided to dissolve the second team and Echteld's contract was not renewed.

Echteld was added to the staff of PEC Zwolle in July 2020, where he became responsible for coaching the first-team strikers as well as overseeing the transition of players from under-21 team to first team.

On 5 July 2022, Echteld was appointed the new head coach of Tweede Divisie club De Treffers. On 14 July 2023, he was appointed as an assistant coach to Michael Reiziger for the Netherlands U21 team, while continuing as head coach of De Treffers.

On 20 January 2024, Echteld was appointed as head coach of Jong AZ. On 18 January 2026, he was appointed as head coach of AZ's first team for the remainder of the season, following the dismissal of Maarten Martens. In the Conference League, Echteld managed to get his team to the quarter-finals, beating Noah 4–1 on aggregate in the playoffs, and Sparta Prague 6–1 on aggregate in the Round of 16, before losing to Shakhtar Donetsk 2–5 on aggregate.

In the KNVB Cup, Echteld managed to get his team to the final against NEC, after beating Twente and Telstar in the quarter-finals and the semi-finals respectively. AZ managed to win their fifth KNVB Cup after beating NEC 5–1 on the 19th April 2026, securing a European spot for the Dutch side. AZ later appointed Echteld permanently on 8th May 2026.

== Career statistics ==
=== Managerial ===
As of match played 22 November 2026

Managerial record by team and tenure
Team	From	To	Record				
Team	From	To	P	W	D	L	Win %
Paris Saint-Germain B	1 July 2018	30 June 2019	33	8	10	15	24.24
De Treffers	5 July 2022	19 January 2024	58	33	9	16	56.90
Jong AZ	20 January 2024	17 January 2026	69	25	13	31	36.23
AZ	18 January 2026	Present	43	23	9	11	53.49
Total			203	89	41	73	43.84

== Honours ==
=== Player ===
AZ

- Eerste Divisie: 1997–98

=== Manager ===
AZ

- KNVB Cup: 2025–26
- Johan Cruyff Shield: 2026
