= Theo Vonk =

Dutch footballer and manager (1947–2025)

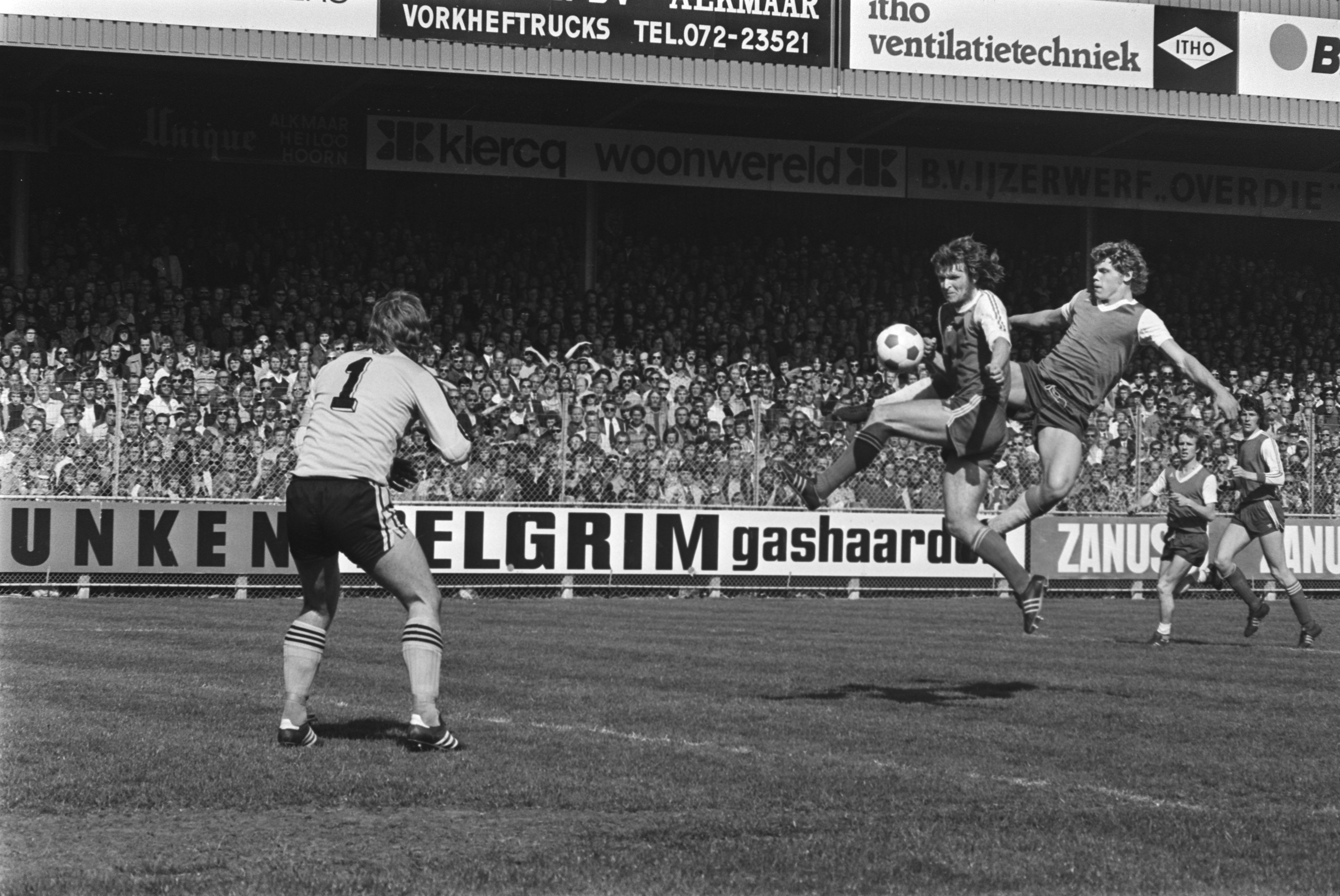
- Theo Vonk (middle) in 1976

Personal information
- Full name: Theodorus Antonius Vonk
- Date of birth: 16 December 1947
- Place of birth: Uitgeest, Netherlands
- Date of death: 24 August 2025 (aged 77)
- Position: Centre-back

Senior career*
Years	Team	Apps	(Gls)
1968–1978	AZ'67	306	(11)
1978–1979	FC Volendam	12	(6)
Total		318	(17)

Managerial career
- De Tubanters 1897
- 1979–1984: AZ'67 (assistant manager)
- 1984–1986: Sparta Rotterdam
- 1986–1992: FC Twente
- 1992: Real Burgos
- 1993–1994: FC Groningen
- 1994–1997: AZ
- 1998: Roda JC
- 1998–1999: Heracles
- 2003–2004: Eintracht Nordhorn
- 2007–2008: Enschede
- 2012–2013: Enschede
- 2018: Glacis United
- * Club domestic league appearances and goals

Theodorus Antonius Vonk (16 December 1947 – 24 August 2025) was a Dutch football player and manager, who was latterly in charge of Gibraltar Premier Division side Glacis United, where he also served as technical director.

== Career ==
Vonk was born in Uitgeest on 16 December 1947. He spent the majority of his playing career at AZ'67, playing for them as a central defender for ten years from 1968 to 1978, before spending a year at FC Volendam and subsequently retiring.

After retiring from playing, he joined his boyhood club AZ'67 as assistant manager, spending five years at the club before moving to Sparta Rotterdam in 1984. After a successful two years at the club, during which he guided them to 4th in his first season, he moved to FC Twente, finishing third three times over six years. A disastrous spell in Spain with Real Burgos followed in 1992, after which he became something of a journeyman manager, aside from three years in charge of AZ. Five years after leaving his last job at Sportclub Enschede, he joined Glacis United as manager and technical director. He left the club on 10 August 2018 for personal reasons.

== Personal life and death ==
Theo Vonk was the father of Michel Vonk, who notably played for AZ and Manchester City during his playing career. In 2013, while in his second spell at Enschede, he suffered a stroke.

Vonk died on 24 August 2025, at the age of 77.

== Honours ==
=== As a player ===
AZ'67

- KNVB Cup: 1977–78

=== As a manager ===
AZ'67/AZ

- Eredivisie: 1980–81*
- Eerste Divisie: 1995–96
- KNVB Cup: 1980–81*, 1981–82*
- UEFA Cup runner-up: 1980–81*

(* as assistant manager)
