= Robert Heinz =

German football manager (died 1972)

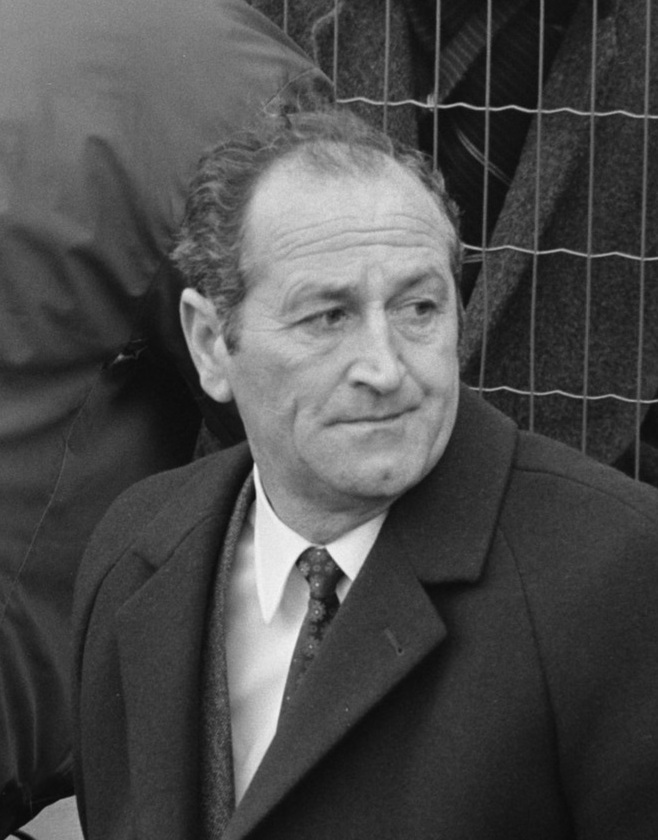
- Heinz in 1970

Personal information
- Date of birth: 1924
- Date of death: 23 September 1972 (aged 47–48)
- Place of death: Neuerburg, Rhineland-Palatinate, Germany

Managerial career
- Years: Team
- VfL Trier
- 1959–1960: Eintracht Trier 05
- 1960–1969: Luxembourg
- 1969–1971: AZ Alkmaar

Robert Heinz (1924 – 23 September 1972) was a German football manager. He managed VfL Trier, Eintracht Trier 05, the Luxembourg national football team and AZ Alkmaar.
