= Joop Brand =

Dutch footballer and manager

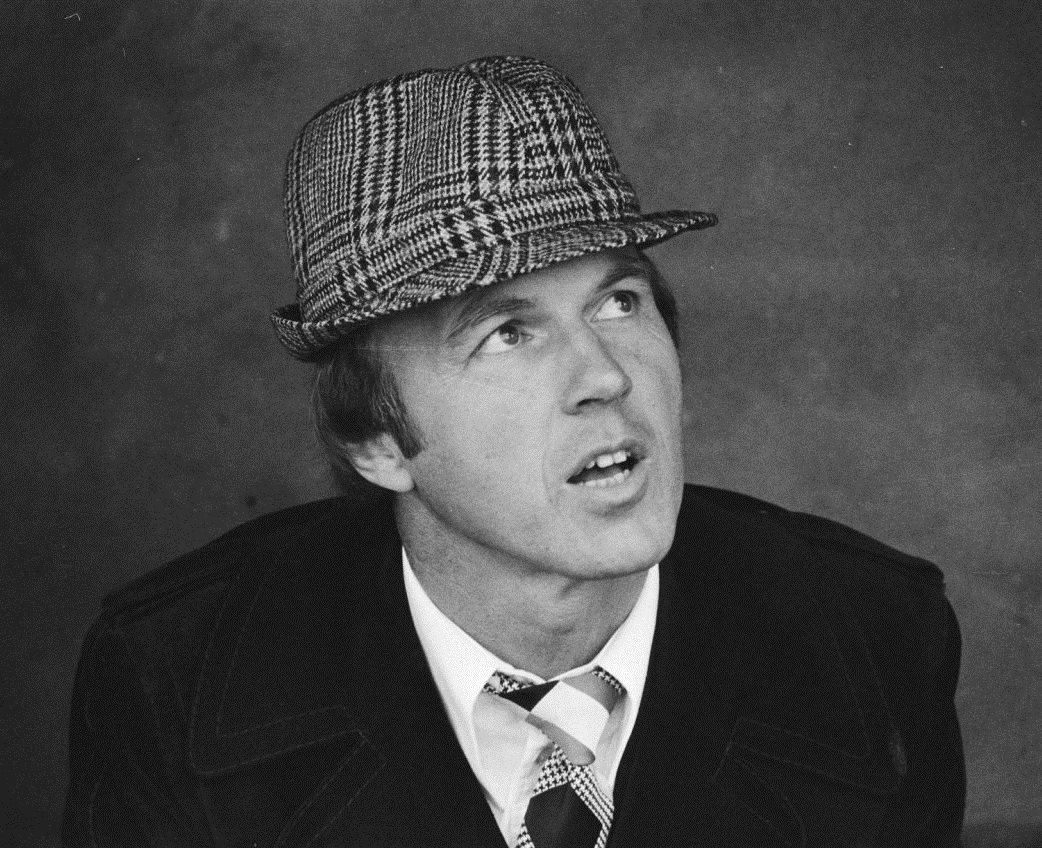
- Brand in 1978

Personal information
- Date of birth: 11 June 1936 (age 90)
- Place of birth: Dubbeldam, Netherlands
- Position: Defender

Senior career*
Years	Team	Apps	(Gls)
1947–1955	Xerxes		
1955–1957	DFC		
1957–1960	HVC	75	(6)
1960–1961	DFC	16	(3)
1961–1964	Heracles	92	(6)

Managerial career
- 1969–1971: DWS
- 1971–1973: Haarlem
- 1973–1976: AZ
- 1978–1980: Go Ahead Eagles
- 1980: Sparta
- 1980–1983: Telstar
- 1985–1986: AZ
- 1996: FC VVV
- * Club domestic league appearances and goals

Joop Brand (born 11 June 1936) is a retired Dutch football player and manager.

== Playing career ==
A defender, Brand played for Xerxes, DFC, HVC and Heracles Almelo.

== Managerial career ==
Brand coached DWS, HFC Haarlem, AZ, Go Ahead Eagles, Sparta Rotterdam and Telstar.

He was appointed head of the Sparta academy after working as caretaker manager at FC VVV.

Brand was dismissed as head of Vitesse's football academy in 2003 after criticizing the club's directors. He was named academy manager at ADO Den Haag, but resigned before he ever worked for the club and left them for PSV in summer 2003. He quit PSV in 2006. He later worked for amateur side IJsselmeervogels.
