= Piet de Wolf =

Dutch football coach (1921–2013)

Personal information
- Date of birth: 1921
- Place of birth: Rotterdam, Netherlands
- Date of death: 14 November 2013 (aged 91)
- Place of death: Rotterdam, Netherlands

Managerial career
- Years: Team
- 1952–1956: Feyenoord (assistant)
- 1956–1957: SC Emma
- 1957–1960: Feyenoord (assistant)
- 1955–1956: Feyenoord (caretaker)
- 1958–1959: Feyenoord (caretaker)
- 1960–1961: Alkmaar '54
- 1964–1965: FC Zaanstreek
- 1965–1966: HVV Tubantia
- 1966–1968: SC Cambuur
- 1970–1972: Fortuna Vlaardingen

Piet de Wolf (1921–14 November 2013) was a Dutch football coach.

== Death ==
De Wolf died on 14 November 2013, aged 91.
