= Terrence Murphy =

Terrence Murphy may refer to:

- Terrence Murphy (American football) (born 1982), retired American football player.
- Terrence Murphy (chiropractor) (born 1966), New York State Senator
- Terrence Murphy (Canadian politician) (1926–2008), Canadian lawyer, politician and judge

== See also ==
- Terry Murphy (disambiguation)
