= Harry Heijnen =

Dutch footballer (1940–2015)

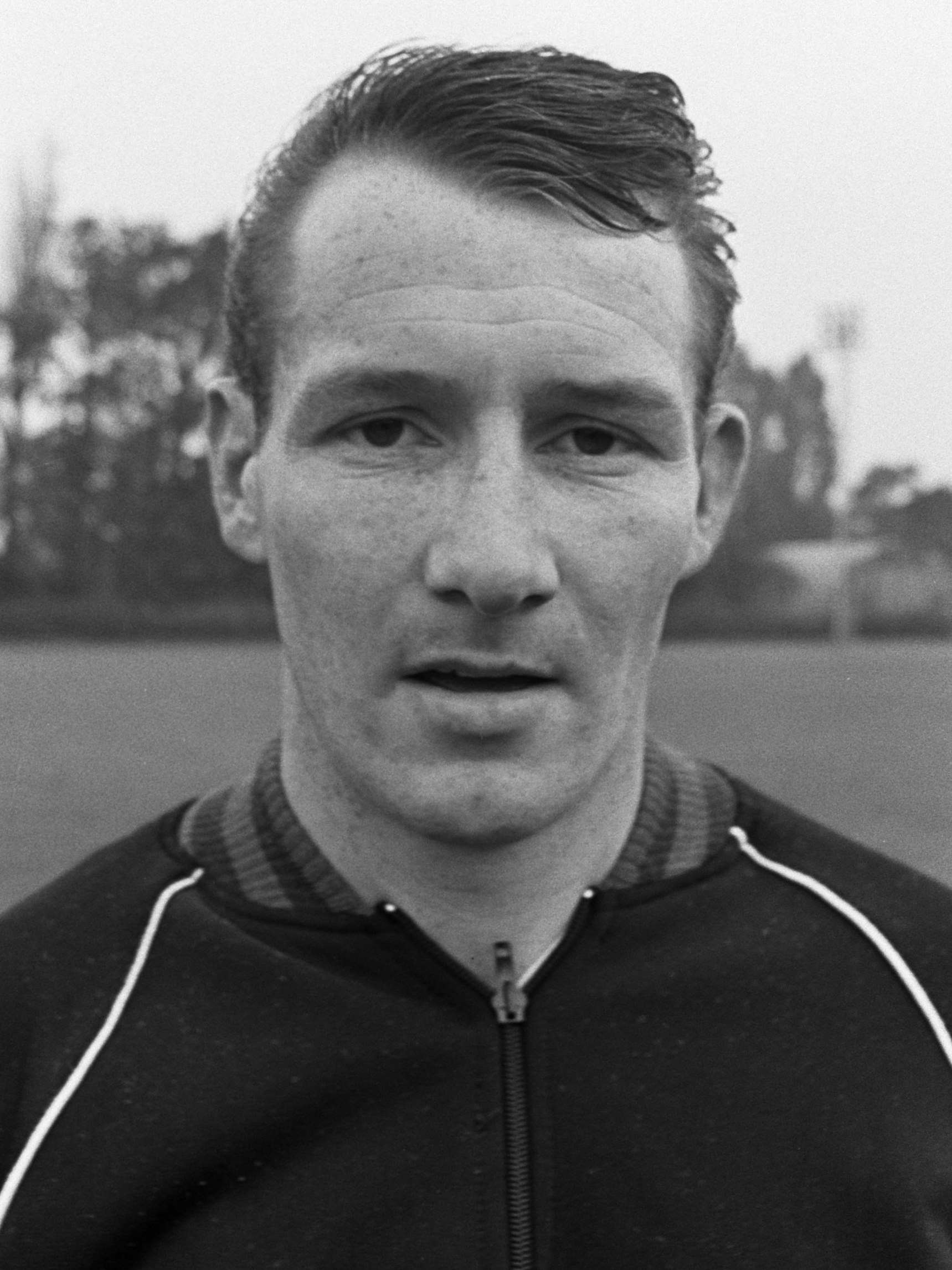

Personal information
- Full name: Harry Heijnen
- Date of birth: 17 October 1940
- Place of birth: Venlo, Netherlands
- Date of death: 18 March 2015 (aged 74)
- Place of death: Venlo, Netherlands
- Height: 1.70 m (5 ft 7 in)
- Position: Winger

Youth career
- Venlosche Boys

Senior career*
Years	Team	Apps	(Gls)
1959–1962	FC VVV	78	(14)
1962–1967	ADO	143	(53)
1967	San Francisco Gales	9	(2)
1967–1969	ADO	58	(9)
1969–1970	MVV	31	(5)
1970–1973	FC VVV	88	(29)
Total		407	(112)

International career^{‡}
1966	Netherlands	1	(0)
- * Club domestic league appearances and goals as of 18 March 2015 ‡ National team caps and goals as of 18 March 2015

Harry Heijnen (17 October 1940 – 18 March 2015) was a Dutch football player.

== Club career ==
Nicknamed Mandje, Heijnen made his debut on 23 August 1959 for hometown club FC VVV with whom he won the Dutch Cup in 1959 and left them in 1962 for a lengthy spell at ADO. He was one of the ADO players to enjoy a 3-month spell in the USA as the Golden Gate Gales, alongside Dick Advocaat among others.

In 1969, he moved to MVV for 50,000 Dutch guilders before returning to VVV to finish his career at the club he started.

== International career ==
Heijnen earned his one and only cap for the Netherlands in a September 1966 friendly match against Austria.

== Retirement and death ==
After retiring as a player, Heijnen coached several amateur sides and ran a pub in Venlo.

He died on 18 March 2015 of esophageal cancer. He had visited his old club ADO in the year before, when already very ill.
