= Denis Neville =

English football player and manager (1915–1995)

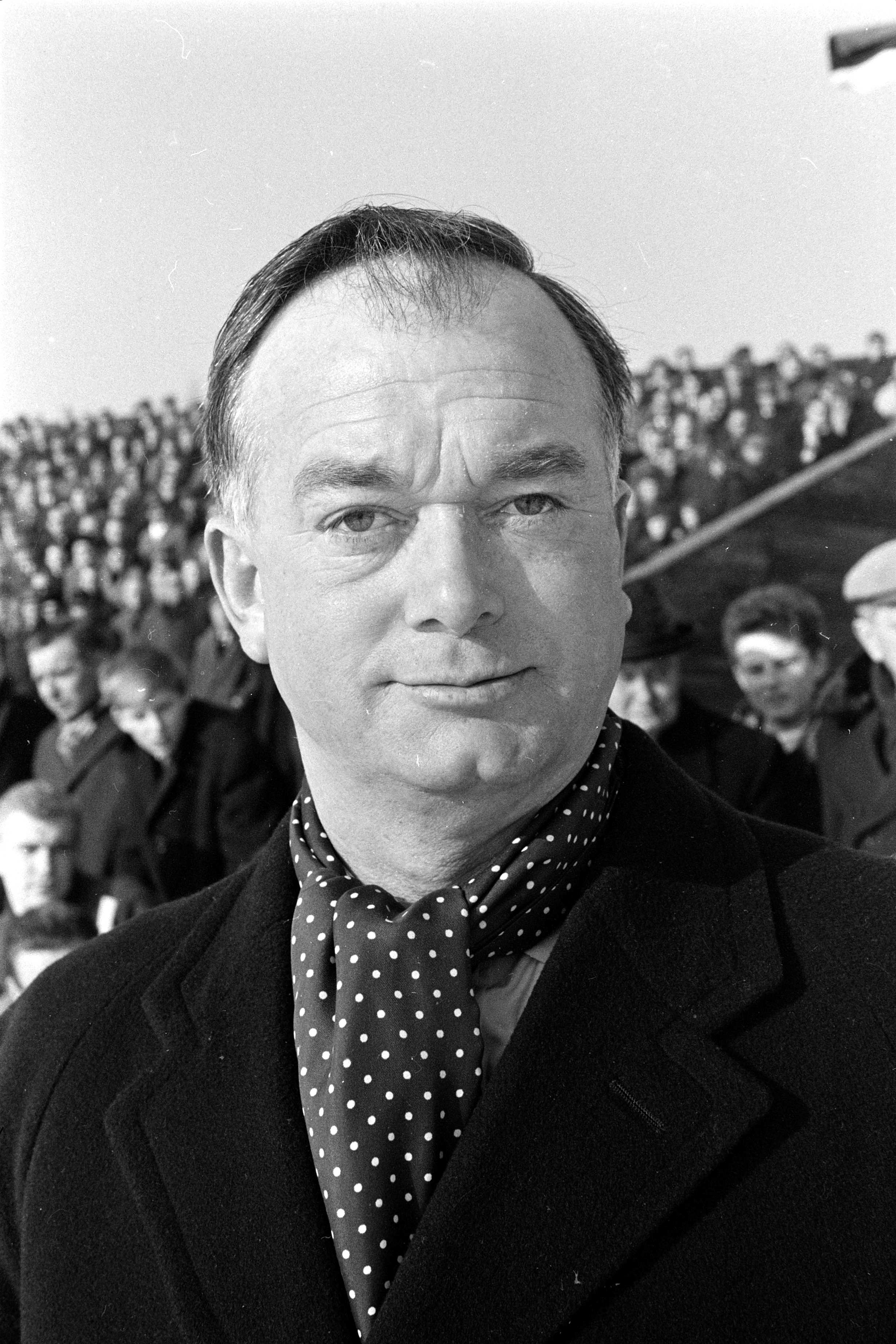
- Neville in 1963

Personal information
- Full name: Denis Charles Neville
- Date of birth: 6 May 1915
- Place of birth: London, England
- Date of death: 11 January 1995 (aged 79)
- Place of death: Rotterdam, Netherlands
- Position: Defender

Senior career*
Years	Team	Apps	(Gls)
1932–1946	Fulham	0	(0)

Managerial career
- 1948–1951: Odense
- 1951–1952: Atalanta
- –: Berchem
- 1955–1963: Sparta Rotterdam
- 1963–1966: Holland Sport
- 1964–1966: Netherlands
- 1966–1967: Canvey Island
- * Club domestic league appearances and goals

Denis Charles Neville (6 May 1915 – 11 January 1995) was an English football player and manager who managed the Netherlands national team between 1964 and 1966. Upon leaving the Netherlands national side, Neville moved back to England to manage non-league side Canvey Island.

He also managed the Danish side Odense, Atalanta in Italy, Sparta Rotterdam and Holland Sport.
