= Norrie Gillespie =

Scottish footballer

Personal information
- Full name: Norman Gillespie
- Date of birth: 20 April 1940 (age 86)
- Place of birth: Edinburgh, Scotland
- Position: Inside forward

Senior career*
Years	Team	Apps	(Gls)
- Arniston Rangers
1960–1963	Arbroath	63	(37)
1963	Falkirk	7	(1)
1963–1964	Wrexham	3	(0)
1964–1965	Berwick Rangers	7	(2)
1965	Toronto City		
- * Club domestic league appearances and goals

Norman "Norrie" Gillespie (born 20 April 1940) is a Scottish former footballer who played as a forward. He mostly played in the Scottish league, including appearances in the top flight of Scottish football for Falkirk in 1963. He has also appeared in the English football league with Wrexham. In 1965, he played abroad in the Eastern Canada Professional Soccer League with Toronto City.
