= Tony Knights =

English footballer

Personal information
- Full name: Anthony Frank Knights
- Date of birth: 13 March 1940
- Place of birth: Grimsby, England
- Date of death: 16 August 2001 (aged 61)
- Place of death: Cleethorpes, North Lincolnshire, England
- Position: Wing half

Senior career*
Years	Team	Apps	(Gls)
1958–1964	Grimsby Town	75	(1)
1964–1965	Luton Town	2	(0)
1965–1966	Aldershot	20	(0)
1966–196?	Gainsborough Trinity		
- * Club domestic league appearances and goals

Anthony Frank Knights (13 March 1940 – 16 August 2001) was an English professional footballer who played as a wing half.
