= Gary Townend =

Former English footballer

Personal information
- Full name: Gary Alfred Townend
- Date of birth: 1 April 1940
- Place of birth: Kilburn, England
- Date of death: 29 May 2021 (aged 81)
- Place of death: Hillingdon, England
- Position: Inside forward

Senior career*
Years	Team	Apps	(Gls)
- Redhill
1960–1964	Millwall	50	(20)
- Hillingdon Borough
1967	Chelmsford City	2	(1)
1970–1971	Weymouth		
- Wealdstone
- * Club domestic league appearances and goals

Gary Alfred Townend (1 April 1940 – 29 May 2021) was an English footballer who played as an inside forward.

== Career ==
In 1960, Townend signed for Millwall from non-league club Redhill. In four years at Millwall, Townend scored 20 goals in 50 Football League appearances. Following his time at Millwall, Townend played for Hillingdon Borough, Chelmsford City, Weymouth and Wealdstone.
