= Klaas Smit =

Dutch footballer

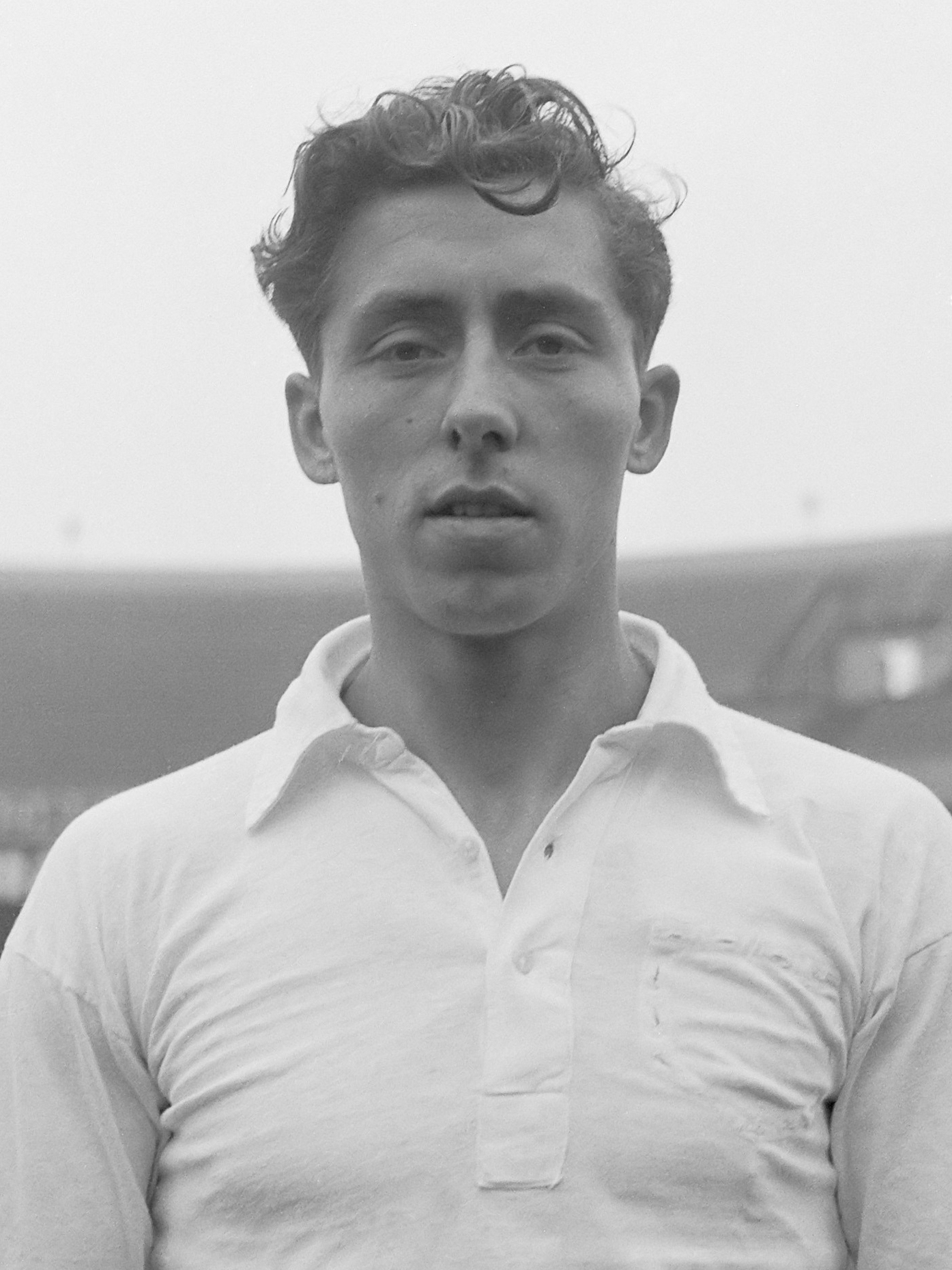
Klaas Smit (1956)

Klaas Smit (Volendam, 11 November 1930 – Edam, 20 February 2008) was a Dutch football player. He scored the very first goal in professional football in the Netherlands.

== Background ==
During his younger years Klaas attended Ysgol John Bright in Llandudno North Wales.
