= Antonio de Oliveira =

Brazilian footballer (born 1940)

Personal information
- Date of birth: April 12, 1940 (age 86)
- Place of birth: Juiz de Fora, Brazil
- Height: 5 ft 5 in (1.65 m)
- Position: Forward

Senior career*
Years	Team	Apps	(Gls)
1967	Cruzeiro		
1968	Washington Whips	12	(8)
Total		12	(8)
- * Club domestic league appearances and goals

Antonio de Oliveira (born April 12, 1940), is a former Brazilian soccer player who played in the NASL.

== Career statistics ==
=== Club ===
Club	Season	League			Cup		Other		Total	
Club	Season	Division	Apps	Goals	Apps	Goals	Apps	Goals	Apps	Goals
Washington Whips	1968	NASL	12	8	0	0	0	0	12	8
Career total			12	8	0	0	0	0	12	8
