= Moussa Dembélé =

Moussa Dembélé or Mousa Dembélé may refer to:

- Moussa Dembélé (hurdler) (born 1988), Senegalese athlete
- Moussa Dembélé (French footballer) (born 1996), striker who plays for Lyon
- Mousa Dembélé (Belgian footballer) (born 1987), retired midfield player.
