= Roger Marklew =

English footballer

Personal information
- Full name: Roger Kelsey Marklew
- Date of birth: 30 January 1940
- Place of birth: Sheffield, England
- Date of death: December 2006 (aged 66)
- Position: Winger

Senior career*
Years	Team	Apps	(Gls)
1956–1957	Penistone Church		
1957–1958	Sheffield United	0	(0)
1958–1959	Sheffield Wednesday	0	(0)
1959–1960	Accrington Stanley	0	(0)
1960–1961	Grimsby Town	6	(1)
- * Club domestic league appearances and goals

Roger Kelsey Marklew (30 January 1940 – December 2006) was an English professional footballer who played as a winger.
