= Terry Murphy (footballer) =

English footballer

Personal information
- Full name: Terence Murphy
- Date of birth: 14 January 1940
- Place of birth: Liverpool, England
- Date of death: August 2019 (aged 79)
- Place of death: Cheshire, England
- Position: Left half

Senior career*
Years	Team	Apps	(Gls)
1960–1961	Northwich Victoria		
1961–1962	Crewe Alexandra	1	(0)
- Witton Albion
- * Club domestic league appearances and goals

Terence Murphy (14 January 1940 – August 2019) was an English professional footballer who played in the Football League as a left half for Crewe Alexandra. He played non-league football for Northwich Victoria and Witton Albion, managed clubs including Rhyl, Runcorn, Altrincham and Witton Albion, and acted as scout for the latter club.
