= Derk =

Derk may refer to:

- Derk (given name), a Dutch masculine given name
- Derk, Kohgiluyeh
- and Boyer-Ahmad, a village in Iran

== See also ==
- Dərk
- Derk-Elsko
- Dirk (disambiguation)
- Durk
- DYRK
- Jaap-Derk
