= Duerk =

Duerk is a surname. Notable people with the surname include:

- Alene Duerk (1920–2018), American naval personnel
- Jeffrey Duerk, American engineer

== See also ==
- Durk
