= 2011–12 AFC Ajax season =

Dutch football club season

Ajax
2011–12 season
- Chairman: Steven ten Have (until 22 December 2011); Hennie Henrichs
- Manager: Frank de Boer
- Eredivisie: 1st
- KNVB Cup: Round of 16
- Champions League: Group stage
- Europa League: Round of 32
- Johan Cruyff Shield: Runners-up
- Top goalscorer: League: Siem de Jong (13 goals); All: Siem de Jong (17 goals)
Home colours	Away colours

During the 2011–12 season AFC Ajax participated in the Eredivisie, the KNVB Cup, the UEFA Champions League and the UEFA Europa League. The first training took place on 27 June 2011. The traditional AFC Ajax Open Day was held on 3 August 2011, followed by a testimonial match for the retired former Ajax goalkeeper Edwin van der Sar.

Ajax's U19 squad will play in the inaugural tournament of the NextGen series.

== Pre-season ==
The first training for the 2011–12 season was held on 27 June 2011. In preparation for the new season Ajax organized a trainingsstage in Fürth, Germany. The squad from manager Frank de Boer stayed there from 11 July 2011 to 16 July 2011. During this training stage, friendly matches were played against Jahn Regensburg and 1. FC Nürnberg. Further friendly matches were played against VV Buitenpost, AZSV Aalten, FC Emmen, Brøndby and Independiente.

== Player statistics ==
Appearances for competitive matches only

No.	Pos	Nat	Player	Total		Eredivisie		UEFA Champions League UEFA Europa League		KNVB Cup Johan Cruijff-schaal XVI	
No.	Pos	Nat	Player	Apps	Goals	Apps	Goals	Apps	Goals	Apps	Goals
1	GK	(Netherlands) NED	Kenneth Vermeer	42	0	33	0	8	0	1	0
2	DF	(Netherlands) NED	Gregory van der Wiel	28	3	19+1	2	6	1	1+1	0
3	DF	(Belgium) BEL	Toby Alderweireld	40	3	29	1	7	1	4	1
4	DF	(Belgium) BEL	Jan Vertonghen	42	10	31	8	8	0	3	2
5	MF	(Netherlands) NED	Vurnon Anita	44	2	30+3	2	7+1	0	2+1	0
6	MF	(Cameroon) CMR	Eyong Enoh	29	0	14+8	0	4+1	0	2	0
7	FW	(Serbia) SRB	Miralem Sulejmani	32	12	21+1	11	8	1	2	0
8	MF	(Denmark) DEN	Christian Eriksen	44	8	33	7	8	1	2+1	0
9	FW	(Iceland) ISL	Kolbeinn Sigþórsson	17	7	8+6	7	2	0	1	0
10	FW	(Netherlands) NED	Siem de Jong	40	17	30	13	6	1	4	3
11	FW	(Netherlands) NED	Lorenzo Ebecilio	27	6	9+12	6	2+3	0	1	0
13	DF	(Netherlands) NED	André Ooijer	12	2	4+5	2	0	0	2+1	0
15	DF	(Denmark) DEN	Nicolai Boilesen	7	0	3+1	0	1+1	0	1	0
16	MF	(Netherlands) NED	Theo Janssen	38	7	29	7	6	0	3	0
17	DF	(Netherlands) NED	Daley Blind	26	0	16+5	0	1+2	0	2	0
18	MF	(Uruguay) URU	Nicolás Lodeiro	19	3	5+8	2	3+2	1	1	0
19	FW	(Russia) RUS	Dmitry Bulykin	26	10	5+14	9	1+3	0	2+1	1
20	DF	(Uruguay) URU	Bruno Silva	0	0	0	0	0	0	0	0
21	MF	(Netherlands) NED	Derk Boerrigter	23	10	15+2	7	4	1	1+1	2
22	GK	(Netherlands) NED	Jasper Cillessen	7	0	1+3	0	0	0	3	0
23	FW	(Armenia) ARM	Aras Özbiliz	16	2	10+2	1	2	1	1+1	0
24	FW	(Morocco) MAR	Mounir El Hamdaoui	0	0	0	0	0	0	0	0
25	MF	(South Africa) RSA	Thulani Serero	10	0	0+7	0	0+2	0	1	0
28	MF	(Morocco) MAR	Ismaïl Aissati	18	2	10+6	2	1	0	1	0
29	MF	(Belgium) BEL	Mats Rits	0	0	0	0	0	0	0	0
30	GK	(Netherlands) NED	Jeroen Verhoeven	0	0	0	0	0	0	0	0
31	DF	(Netherlands) NED	Ruben Ligeon	4	0	1+2	0	0	0	1	0
33	MF	(Netherlands) NED	Joeri de Kamps	0	0	0	0	0	0	0	0
34	DF	(Netherlands) NED	Ricardo van Rhijn	16	0	10+3	0	1+1	0	0+1	0
37	FW	(Democratic Republic of the Congo) COD	Jody Lukoki	11	2	3+3	2	0+3	0	2	0
39	FW	(Netherlands) NED	Davy Klaassen	7	1	1+3	1	0+3	0	0	0
41	FW	(Netherlands) NED	Lesley de Sa	1	1	0	0	0	0	0+1	1
42	DF	(Netherlands) NED	Dico Koppers	10	0	7+1	0	2	0	0	0
57	DF	(Finland) FIN	Henri Toivomäki	0	0	0	0	0	0	0	0
Players sold or loaned out after the start of the season:
40	MF	(Netherlands) NED	Ouasim Bouy	0	0	0	0	0	0	0	0
45	FW	(Netherlands) NED	Tom Boere	0	0	0	0	0	0	0	0

Updated 22 January 2012

=== 2011–12 Selection by Nationality ===
Nationality	(Netherlands)	(Belgium)	(Denmark)	(Uruguay)	(Morocco)	(Armenia)	(Cameroon)	(Iceland)	(Russia)	(Serbia)	(South Africa)	(Democratic Republic of the Congo)	(Argentina)	Total Players
Current squad selection	11	3	2	2	1	1	1	1	1	1	1	-	-	24
Youth/reserves squad in AFC Ajax selection	8	-	1	-	1	-	-	-	-	-	-	1	-	11
Players out on loan	5	-	-	-	-	-	-	-	-	-	-	-	1	6

== Team statistics ==
=== Eredivisie standings 2011–12 ===
Current standing	Matches played	Wins	Draws	Losses	Points	Goals for	Goals against	Yellow cards (yellow card)	Red cards (red card)
1	34	23	7	4	76	93	36	39	4

==== Points by match day ====
Match day	1	2	3	4	5	6	7	8	9	10	11	12	13	14	15	16	17	18	19	20	21	22	23	24	25	26	27	28	29	30	31	32	33	34	Total
Points	3	3	1	3	3	1	1	0	1	1	3	0	1	3	3	3	3	1	0	0	3	3	3	3	3	3	3	3	3	3	3	3	3	3	76

==== Total points by match day ====
Match day	1	2	3	4	5	6	7	8	9	10	11	12	13	14	15	16	17	18	19	20	21	22	23	24	25	26	27	28	29	30	31	32	33	34	Total
Points	3	6	7	10	13	14	15	15	16	17	20	20	21	24	27	30	33	34	34	34	37	40	43	46	49	52	55	58	61	64	67	70	73	76	76

==== Standing by match day ====
Match day	1	2	3	4	5	6	7	8	9	10	11	12	13	14	15	16	17	18	19	20	21	22	23	24	25	26	27	28	29	30	31	32	33	34	Standing
Standing	1st	1st	2nd	2nd	1st	3rd	3rd	4th	6th	6th	5th	5th	4th	4th	4th	4th	4th	4th	4th	6th	6th	6th	5th	4th	2nd	2nd	2nd	1st	1st	1st	1st	1st	1st	1st	1st

==== Goals by match day ====
Match day	1	2	3	4	5	6	7	8	9	10	11	12	13	14	15	16	17	18	19	20	21	22	23	24	25	26	27	28	29	30	31	32	33	34	Total
Goals	4	5	2	4	3	2	1	0	2	1	4	4	2	3	4	1	4	1	2	0	2	4	4	4	3	2	2	6	5	3	2	2	2	3	93

=== Statistics for the 2011–12 season ===
- This is an overview of all the statistics for played matches in the 2011–12 season.

	Friendlies	Johan Cruijff Schaal	KNVB Cup	UEFA Champions League	UEFA Europa League	Eredivisie	Total
Matches	11 of 11	1 of 1	3 of 3	6 of 6	2 of 2	34 of 34	56 of 56
Win	8 of 11	0 of 1	2 of 3	2 of 6	1 of 2	23 of 34	35 of 56
Draw	1 of 11	0 of 1	0 of 3	2 of 6	0 of 2	7 of 34	10 of 56
Loss	2 of 11	1 of 1	1 of 3	2 of 6	1 of 2	4 of 34	11 of 56
Home	3 of 3	0 of 0	1 of 1	3 of 3	1 of 1	17 of 17	25 of 25
Away	8 of 8	1 of 1	2 of 3	3 of 3	1 of 1	17 of 17	32 of 32
Yellow cards (yellow card)	5	2	2	3	5	40	57
Red cards (red card)	0	0	0	0	0	4	4
2 x yellow in 1 match (yellow card) (yellow-red card)	0	0	0	0	0	2	2
Number of substitutes used (substituted on) (substituted off)	91	3	6	16	6	95	214
Goals for	29	1	9	6	2	93	142
Goals against	5	2	6	6	3	36	58
Balance	+24	-1	+3	0	-1	+57	+81
Clean sheets	7	0	0	4	0	12	23
Penalties for	2	0	0	0	0	6	8
Penalties against	0	1	0	0	0	3	4

=== 2011–12 team records ===
Description	Competition	Result
Biggest win	(Netherlands) Friendly match	AZSV – AFC Ajax ( 0–11 )
Biggest win	(Netherlands) Johan Cruijff Schaal	—
Biggest win	(Netherlands) KNVB Cup	Roda JC – AFC Ajax ( 2–4 )
Biggest win	(Europe) UEFA Champions League	AFC Ajax – Dinamo Zagreb ( 4–0 )
Biggest win	(Europe) UEFA Europa League	Manchester United – AFC Ajax ( 1–2 )
Biggest win	(Netherlands) Eredivisie	AFC Ajax – Heracles Almelo ( 6–0 )
Biggest loss	(Germany) Friendly match	1. FC Nürnberg – AFC Ajax ( 2–0 )
Biggest loss	(Netherlands) Johan Cruijff Schaal	FC Twente – AFC Ajax ( 2–1 )
Biggest loss	(Netherlands) KNVB Cup	AFC Ajax – AZ ( 2–3 )
Biggest loss	(Europe) UEFA Champions League	Real Madrid – AFC Ajax ( 3–0 )
Biggest loss	(Europe) UEFA Europa League	AFC Ajax – Manchester United ( 0–2 )
Biggest loss	(Netherlands) Eredivisie	FC Utrecht – AFC Ajax ( 6–4 )
Most goals in a match	(Netherlands) Friendly match	AZSV – AFC Ajax ( 0–11 )
Most goals in a match	(Netherlands) Johan Cruijff Schaal	FC Twente – AFC Ajax ( 2–1 )
Most goals in a match	(Netherlands) KNVB Cup	Roda JC – AFC Ajax ( 2–4 )
Most goals in a match	(Europe) UEFA Champions League	AFC Ajax – Dinamo Zagreb ( 4–0 )
Most goals in a match	(Europe) UEFA Europa League	Manchester United – AFC Ajax ( 1–2 )
Most goals in a match	(Netherlands) Eredivisie	FC Utrecht – AFC Ajax ( 6–4 )

==== Topscorers ====
Friendlies

Nr.	Name	Goal
1.	(Armenia) Aras Özbiliz	5
2.	(Netherlands) Lorenzo Ebecilio	4
3.	(Netherlands) Geoffrey Castillion	3
3.	(Belgium) Mats Rits	3
3.	(Netherlands) Rodney Sneijder	3
6.	(Netherlands) Theo Janssen	2
7.	(Netherlands) Jan-Arie van der Heijden	1
7.	(Netherlands) Derk Boerrigter	1
7.	(South Africa) Thulani Serero	1
7.	(Netherlands) Ricardo van Rhijn	1
7.	(Netherlands) André Ooijer	1
7.	(Iceland) Kolbeinn Sigþórsson	1
7.	(Denmark) Christian Eriksen	1
7.	(Netherlands) Vurnon Anita	1
7.	(Netherlands) Siem de Jong	1
7.	(Democratic Republic of the Congo) Jody Lukoki	1
7.	(Netherlands) Tom Boere	1
7.	(Russia) Dmitri Bulykin	1
Total		32

Johan Cruijff Schaal

Nr.	Name	Goal
1.	(Belgium) Toby Alderweireld	1
Total		1

Eredivisie

Nr.	Name	Goal
1.	(Netherlands) Siem de Jong	13
2.	(Serbia) Miralem Sulejmani	11
3.	(Russia) Dmitri Bulykin	9
4.	(Netherlands) Theo Janssen	8
4.	(Belgium) Jan Vertonghen	8
6.	(Netherlands) Derk Boerrigter	7
6.	(Iceland) Kolbeinn Sigþórsson	7
6.	(Denmark) Christian Eriksen	7
9.	(Netherlands) Lorenzo Ebecilio	6
10.	(Netherlands) Gregory van der Wiel	2
10.	(Democratic Republic of the Congo) Jody Lukoki	2
10.	(Netherlands) André Ooijer	2
10.	(Uruguay) Nicolás Lodeiro	2
10.	(Netherlands) Vurnon Anita	2
10.	(Morocco) Ismaïl Aissati	2
14.	(Belgium) Toby Alderweireld	1
14.	(Netherlands) Davy Klaassen	1
14.	(Armenia) Aras Özbiliz	1
Own goals	(Cape Verde) Guy Ramos (RKC Waalwijk)	1
Own goals	(Denmark) Simon Poulsen (AZ)	1
Total		93

KNVB Cup

Nr.	Name	Goal
1.	(Netherlands) Siem de Jong	3
2.	(Belgium) Jan Vertonghen	2
2.	(Netherlands) Derk Boerrigter	2
3.	(Russia) Dmitri Bulykin	1
3.	(Netherlands) Lesley de Sa	1
Total		9

UEFA Champions League

Nr.	Name	Goal
1.	(Netherlands) Derk Boerrigter	1
1.	(Denmark) Christian Eriksen	1
1.	(Netherlands) Gregory van der Wiel	1
1.	(Serbia) Miralem Sulejmani	1
1.	(Netherlands) Siem de Jong	1
1.	(Uruguay) Nicolás Lodeiro	1
Total		6

UEFA Europa League

Nr.	Name	Goal
1.	(Armenia) Aras Özbiliz	1
1.	(Belgium) Toby Alderweireld	1
Total		2

== Placements ==
	Friendlies	Johan Cruijff Schaal	KNVB Cup	UEFA Champions League	UEFA Europa League	Eredivisie
Status	11 played, 8 wins, 1 draw, 2 losses	Runner-up; Lost to: FC Twente	Round of 16; Lost to: AZ	3rd Place in Group D Placement for: UEFA Europa League	Eliminated in Round of 32; Last opponent: Manchester United	Champions; 76 points in 34 matches 31st title

- Jan Vertonghen is voted Player of the year by the supporters of AFC Ajax.
- Ricardo van Rhijn is voted Talent of the year by the supporters of AFC Ajax.
- Frank de Boer is nominated for the Rinus Michels Award 2012 in the category: Best Trainer/Coach in Professional Football.
- Christian Eriksen is voted Danish Football Player of the Year by the Danish Football Association and TV2.
- Nicolai Boilesen is voted Danish Football Talent of the Year by the Danish Football Association and TV2.
- Dmitri Bulykin is voted Best Russian Football Player Abroad by the Russian Football Union.
- Theo Janssen is voted Gelders Sportsman of the Year by the Gelders Sportgala 2011.
- Jan Vertonghen wins the Golden boots award.
- Christian Eriksen wins the Bronze boots award.

== Pre-season and friendlies ==
2 July 2011	vv Buitenpost (Netherlands)	0–4	(Netherlands) Ajax	Buitenpost, Netherlands
15:00		Report	Sneijder 44', 69' van der Heijden 46'; Rits 75'	Stadium: De Swadde; Attendance: 4,500; Referee: Bellinga

6 July 2011	AZSV Aalten (Netherlands)	0–11	(Netherlands) Ajax	Aalten, Netherlands
19:00		Report	Castillion 20', 22', 38'; Boerrigter 24'; Janssen 27' (pen.); Rits 64', 70'; Sneijder 66'; Özbiliz 76'; Ebecilio 80'; Van Rhijn 82'	Stadium: Villekamp; Attendance: 4,500; Referee: Smit

9 July 2011	FC Emmen (Netherlands)	0–1	(Netherlands) Ajax	Emmen, Netherlands
19:00		Report	Ooijer 60'	Stadium: Univé Stadion; Attendance: 8,600; Referee: Kamphuis

13 July 2011	Jahn Regensburg (Germany)	0–0	(Netherlands) Ajax	Regensburg, Germany
18:30		Report		Stadium: Jahnstadion (Regensburg); Attendance: 1,807

16 July 2011	1. FC Nürnberg (Germany)	2–0	(Netherlands) Ajax	Nuremberg, Germany
15:00	Mak 61'; Mendler 82'	Report		Stadium: easyCredit-Stadion; Attendance: 15,000; Referee: Hartmann

20 July 2011	Brøndby (Denmark)	0–3	(Netherlands) Ajax	Copenhagen, Denmark
18:30		Report	Sigþórsson 38'; Serero 55'; Ebecilio 63'	Stadium: Brøndby Stadium; Referee: Johansen

24 July 2011	Ajax (Netherlands)	5–1	(Argentina) Independiente	Amsterdam, Netherlands
14:30	Eriksen 6'; Özbiliz 47', 50', 54'; Ebecilio 74'	Report	Benítez 70'	Stadium: Amsterdam Arena; Attendance: 19,149; Referee: Richard Liesveld

9 August 2011	Almere City (Netherlands)	0–1	(Netherlands) Ajax	Almere, Netherlands
19:30		Report	Anita 35'	Stadium: Mitsubishi Forklift Stadion

10 November 2011	Ajax (Netherlands)	3–1	(Netherlands) Go Ahead Eagles	Amsterdam, Netherlands
17:30	Özbiliz 3'; Ebecilio 56'; Boere 75'	Report	Gerritsen 65'	Stadium: Sportpark De Toekomst

6 January 2012	Ajax (Netherlands)	1–0	(Netherlands) Almere City	Amsterdam, Netherlands
14:30	Bulykin 88'	Report		Stadium: Sportpark De Toekomst; Attendance: 3,000

14 January 2012	Palmeiras (Brazil)	1–0	(Netherlands) Ajax	São Paulo, Brazil
17:00 (UTC-2)	Carmona 90+4'	Report		Stadium: Estádio do Pacaembu; Attendance: 25,432; Referee: Marcelo Aparecido Ribeiro de Souza

== Competitions ==
All times are in CEST

=== Johan Cruyff Shield ===
30 July 2011	FC Twente	2–1	Ajax	Amsterdam
20:00 CET	Janko 21' (pen.); Ruiz 68'	Report	Alderweireld 54'	Stadium: Amsterdam ArenA; Attendance: 45,000; Referee: Pol van Boekel

=== Eredivisie ===
7 August 2011 1	De Graafschap	1–4	Ajax	Doetinchem
14:30	Van de Pavert 15'	Report	Sulejmani 21', 62'; Boerrigter 31'; Janssen 65'	Stadium: De Vijverberg; Attendance: 12,459; Referee: Bas Nijhuis

14 August 2011 2	Ajax	5–1	SC Heerenveen	Amsterdam
14:30	Sigþórsson 38'; Alderweireld 42'; Boerrigter 51'; Sulejmani 74'; Van der Wiel 90+3'	Report	Dost 39'	Stadium: Amsterdam Arena; Attendance: 48,820; Referee: Richard Liesveld

21 August 2011 3	VVV-Venlo	2–2	Ajax	Venlo
14:30	Musa 47', 60'	Report	Janssen 68'; Sigþórsson 69'	Stadium: De Koel; Attendance: 8,000; Referee: Ruud Bossen

26 August 2011 4	Ajax	4–1	Vitesse Arnhem	Amsterdam
20:00	Eriksen 53'; Boerrigter 62'; Sigþórsson 63', 71'	Report	Büttner 89'	Stadium: Amsterdam Arena; Attendance: 50,472; Referee: Jan Wegereef

10 September 2011 5	Heracles Almelo	2–3	Ajax	Almelo
20:45	Overtoom 31'; Plet 89'	Report	de Jong 45+2', 64'; Sulejmani 81'; Ebecilio (red card) 90+2'	Stadium: Polman Stadion; Attendance: 8,500; Referee: Pol van Boekel

18 September 2011 6	PSV	2–2	Ajax	Eindhoven
12:30	Matavž 2'; Wijnaldum 55' (pen.)	Report	Sigþórsson 45+4'; Bulykin 79'	Stadium: Philips Stadion; Attendance: 33,000; Referee: Björn Kuipers

24 September 2011 7	Ajax	1–1	FC Twente	Amsterdam
20:45	Sulejmani 10'	Report	De Jong 87'	Stadium: Amsterdam Arena; Attendance: 51,541; Referee: Pieter Vink

2 October 2011 8	FC Groningen	1–0	Ajax	Groningen
14:30	Bacuna 62' (pen.)	Report	Van der Wiel (yellow card) 28' (yellow-red card) 61'	Stadium: Euroborg; Attendance: 21,000; Referee: Richard Liesveld

15 October 2011 9	Ajax	2–2	AZ	Amsterdam
18:45	Sulejmani 47' (pen.); Janssen 82'	Report	Holman 14'; Beerens 22'	Stadium: Amsterdam Arena; Attendance: 51,585; Referee: Björn Kuipers

23 October 2011 10	Ajax	1–1	Feyenoord	Amsterdam
12:30	Vermeer (red card) 64'; Vertonghen 67'	Report	De Vrij 61'	Stadium: Amsterdam Arena; Attendance: 52,316; Referee: Bas Nijhuis

29 October 2011 11	Roda JC	0–4	Ajax	Kerkrade
18:45		Report	Eriksen 7'; Janssen 50'; Lukoki 57'; Ebecilio 85'	Stadium: Parkstad Limburg Stadion; Attendance: 18,400; Referee: Reinold Wiedemeijer

6 November 2011 12	FC Utrecht	6–4	Ajax	Utrecht
12:30	Asare 16', 55'; Duplan 19'; Bovenberg 49'; Mulenga 52'; Kali 90+6'	Report	Bulykin 8', 41'; Ooijer 32'; Eriksen 72'	Stadium: Galgenwaard; Attendance: 20,000; Referee: Ruud Bossen

19 November 2011 13	Ajax	2–2	NAC Breda	Amsterdam
20:45	Sulejmani 36'; Boerrigter 84'		Kolk 85'; Schilder 89'	Stadium: Amsterdam Arena; Attendance: 49,531; Referee: Pol van Boekel

27 November 2011 14	NEC	0–3	Ajax	Nijmegen
14:30		Report	Sulejmani 53', 78'; Klaassen 82'	Stadium: De Goffert; Attendance: 12,100; Referee: Serdar Gözübüyük

3 December 2011 15	Ajax	4–1	Excelsior	Amsterdam
20:45	Vertonghen 11', 39'; Sulejmani 63' (pen.); Lodeiro 67'	Report	Maatsen 45'; Scheimann (yellow card) 37' (red card)	Stadium: Amsterdam Arena; Attendance: 47,497; Referee: Richard Liesveld

11 December 2011 16	RKC Waalwijk	0–1	Ajax	Waalwijk
14:30	Bandjar (red card) 64'	Report	Ramos 42' (o.g.)	Stadium: Mandemakers Stadion; Attendance: 22,000; Referee: Jan Wegereef

18 December 2011 17	Ajax	4–0	ADO Den Haag	Amsterdam
12:30	Eriksen 19'; Janssen 58'; Bulykin 79'; Sulejmani 85'	Report	Leeuwin (red card) 10'	Stadium: Amsterdam Arena; Attendance: 46,854; Referee: Kevin Blom

22 January 2012 18	AZ	1–1	Ajax	Alkmaar
14:30	Elm 37'	Report	Poulsen 75' (o.g.)	Stadium: AFAS Stadion; Attendance: 16,000; Referee: Pieter Vink

29 January 2012 19	Feyenoord	4–2	Ajax	Rotterdam
12:30	Guidetti 30' (pen.), 41', 83'; Bakkal 50'	Report	Eriksen 18'; Bulykin 80'	Stadium: De Kuip; Attendance: 48,000; Referee: Björn Kuipers

5 February 2012 20	Ajax	0–2	FC Utrecht	Amsterdam
12:30		Report	Duplan 40', 78'	Stadium: Amsterdam Arena; Attendance: 45,880; Referee: Danny Makkelie

11 February 2012 21	NAC Breda	0–2	Ajax	Breda
20:45		Report	Bulykin 68'; Lodeiro 89'	Stadium: Rat Verlegh Stadion; Attendance: 17,000; Referee: Kevin Blom

19 February 2012 22	Ajax	4–1	NEC	Amsterdam
14:30	Bulykin 5', 27'; Vertonghen 8'; De Jong 57'	Report	Van Eijden 69'	Stadium: Amsterdam Arena; Attendance: 47,611; Referee: Ruud Bossen

26 February 2012 23	Excelsior	1–4	Ajax	Rotterdam
12:30	Matheij 68'	Report	Özbiliz 22'; De Jong 45', 87'; Vertonghen 90'	Stadium: Woudestein; Attendance: 3,500; Referee: Paul van Boekel

4 March 2012 24	Ajax	4–1	Roda JC	Amsterdam
14:30	Ebecilio 67', 89', 90+3'; Anita 78'	Report	Malki 40'	Stadium: Amsterdam Arena; Attendance: 50,939; Referee: Richard Liesveld

11 March 2012 25	Ajax	3–0	RKC Waalwijk	Amsterdam
14:30	Vertonghen 26'; De Jong 54'; Ebecilio 89'	Report		Stadium: Amsterdam Arena; Attendance: 51,353; Referee: Reinold Wiedemeijer

18 March 2012 26	ADO Den Haag	0–2	Ajax	The Hague
12:30	Boussaboun (red card) 25'	Report	Lukoki 48'; Vertonghen 60'	Stadium: Kyocera Stadion; Attendance: 15,000; Referee: Bas Nijhuis

25 March 2012 27	Ajax	2–0	PSV	Amsterdam
16:30	Aissati 56'; De Jong 62' (pen.)	Report		Stadium: Amsterdam Arena; Attendance: 51,207; Referee: Pieter Vink

1 April 2012 28	Ajax	6–0	Heracles Almelo	Amsterdam
14:30	Janssen 25'; Ebecilio 48'; Eriksen 53'; Anita 63'; De Jong 72'; Sigþórsson 88'	Report		Stadium: Amsterdam Arena; Attendance: 51,395; Referee: Jack van Hulten

11 April 2012 29	SC Heerenveen	0–5	Ajax	Heerenveen
21:00	Vandenbussche (red card) 3'	Report	Janssen 6' (pen.); Aissati 19'; De Jong 25', 45+1', 63'	Stadium: Abe Lenstra Stadion; Attendance: 26,100; Referee: Kevin Blom

15 April 2012 30	Ajax	3–1	De Graafschap	Amsterdam
14:30	Boerrigter 3', 44'; Eriksen 37'	Report	De Leeuw 45'	Stadium: Amsterdam Arena; Attendance: 52,107; Referee: Eric Braamhaar

22 April 2012 31	Ajax	2–0	FC Groningen	Amsterdam
16:30	Boerrigter 45+1'; Sigþórsson 80'	Report		Stadium: Amsterdam Arena; Attendance: 51,405; Referee: Serdar Gözübüyük

29 April 2012 32	FC Twente	1–2	Ajax	Enschede
14:30	Fer 72'	Report	Janssen 30' (pen.); Van der Wiel 78'	Stadium: De Grolsch Veste; Attendance: 30,000; Referee: Richard Liesveld

2 May 2012 33	Ajax	2–0	VVV-Venlo	Amsterdam
20:00 CET (UTC+01)	De Jong 8', 58'	Report		Stadium: Amsterdam Arena; Attendance: 52,960; Referee: Reinold Wiedemeijer

6 May 2012 34	Vitesse Arnhem	1–3	Ajax	Arnhem
14:30	Hofs 29'	Report	Bulykin 41'; Ooijer 74'; Vertonghen 80'	Stadium: Gelredome; Attendance: 23,549; Referee: Pieter Vink

=== KNVB Cup ===
21 September 2011 Second round	VV Noordwijk	1–3	Ajax	Noordwijk
18:45	Bartlema 65'	Report	De Jong 37'; Bulykin 57'; De Sa 62'	Stadium: Sportpark Duinwetering; Attendance: 5,360; Referee: Ruud Bosse

26 October 2011 Third round	Roda JC	2–4	Ajax	Kerkrade
20:45	Donald 4'; Junker 64'	Report	Vertonghen 5', 89'; Boerrigter 63', 73'	Stadium: Parkstad Limburg Stadion; Attendance: 14,630; Referee: Jan Wegereef

21 December 2011 Round of 16	Ajax	Abandoned	AZ	Amsterdam
20:45		Report		Stadium: Amsterdam Arena
Note: The match was abandoned in the 35th minute after AZ Alkmaar left the field of play in protest after AZ goalkeeper Esteban Alvarado was sent off (red card) for repeatedly kicking a pitch invader who had attacked him moments before.

19 January 2012 Round of 16	Ajax	2–3	AZ	Amsterdam
14:30	De Jong 10', 37'	Report	Martens 24'; Benschop 32'; Elm 55' (pen.)	Stadium: Amsterdam Arena; Attendance: 20,000; Referee: Pol van Boekel

=== UEFA Champions League ===
==== Group stage ====
Pos	Team	Pld	W	D	L	GF	GA	GD	Pts	Qualification
1	(Spain) Real Madrid	6	6	0	0	19	2	+17	18	Advance to knockout phase
2	(France) Lyon	6	2	2	2	9	7	+2	8 (Note: Tied on head-to-head results. Overall goal difference was used as the tiebreaker.)	Advance to knockout phase
3	(Netherlands) Ajax	6	2	2	2	6	6	0	8	Transfer to Europa League
4	(Croatia) Dinamo Zagreb	6	0	0	6	3	22	−19	0	

Source: Soccerway
Notes:

14 September 2011 1	Ajax (Netherlands)	0–0	(France) Lyon	Amsterdam, Netherlands
20:45		Report	Källström (yellow card) 55'; Lovren (yellow card) 66'; Gomis (yellow card) 75'	Stadium: Amsterdam Arena; Attendance: 49,504; Referee: Wolfgang Stark (Germany)

27 September 2011 2	Real Madrid (Spain)	3–0	(Netherlands) Ajax	Madrid, Spain
20:45	Carvalho (yellow card) 19'; Ronaldo 25'; Kaká 41'; Benzema 49'	Report		Stadium: Santiago Bernabéu Stadium; Attendance: 67,000; Referee: Mark Clattenburg (England)

18 October 2011 3	Dinamo Zagreb (Croatia)	0–2	(Netherlands) Ajax	Zagreb, Croatia
20:45	Vida (yellow card) 13'; Calello (yellow card) 26'; Ibáñez (yellow card) 45+2'; Sammir (yellow card) 60'; Šimunić (yellow card) 76'; Tomečak (yellow card) 86'	Report	Boerrigter (yellow card) 45+3', (goal) 49'; Eriksen 90'	Stadium: Stadion Maksimir; Attendance: 25,714; Referee: Manuel Gräfe (Germany)

2 November 2011 4	Ajax (Netherlands)	4–0	(Croatia) Dinamo Zagreb	Amsterdam, Netherlands
20:45	Anita (yellow card) 7'; Enoh (yellow card) 14'; Van der Wiel 20'; Sulejmani 25'; De Jong 65'; Lodeiro 92'	Report	Calello (yellow card) 25'; Vida (yellow card) 63'; Ibáñez (yellow card) 85'	Stadium: Amsterdam Arena; Attendance: 49,707; Referee: Martin Atkinson (England)

22 November 2011 5	Lyon (France)	0–0	(Netherlands) Ajax	Lyon, France
20:45	Réveillère (yellow card) 56'; Cris (yellow card) 69'	Report	Enoh (yellow card) 32'; Janssen (yellow card) 56'	Stadium: Stade de Gerland; Attendance: 35,070; Referee: Jonas Eriksson (Sweden)

7 December 2011 6	Ajax (Netherlands)	0–3	(Spain) Real Madrid	Amsterdam, Netherlands
20:45	Vertonghen (yellow card) 37'	Report	Callejón 14', 90+2'; Higuaín 41'; Arbeloa (yellow card) 58'	Stadium: Amsterdam Arena; Attendance: 51,557; Referee: Manuel De Sousa (Portugal)

=== UEFA Europa League ===
==== Knockout phase ====
===== Round of 32 =====
16 February 2012 First leg	Ajax (Netherlands)	0–2	(England) Manchester United	Amsterdam, Netherlands
19:00	De Jong (yellow card) 54'; Alderweireld (yellow card) 87'	Report	Fábio (yellow card) 52'; Young 59'; Hernández 85'	Stadium: Amsterdam Arena; Attendance: 51,000; Referee: Gianluca Rocchi (Italy)

23 February 2012 Second leg	Manchester United (England)	1–2 (3–2 agg.)	(Netherlands) Ajax	Manchester, England
21:05	Hernández 6'; Rafael (yellow card) 28'; Evans (yellow card) 89'	Report	Özbiliz 37'; De Jong (yellow card) 63'; Alderweireld 87'	Stadium: Old Trafford; Attendance: 67,328; Referee: Damir Skomina (Slovenia)

== Transfers for 2011–12 ==
=== Summer transfer window ===
For a list of all Dutch football transfers in the summer window (1 July 2011 to 31 August 2011) please see List of Dutch football transfers summer 2011.

==== Arrivals ====
- The following players moved to AFC Ajax.

	Name	Position	Transfer type	Previous club	Fee
	Return from loan spell				
Substituted on	(Morocco) Ismaïl Aissati	Midfielder	30 June 2011	(Netherlands) Vitesse	-
Substituted on	(Netherlands) Jan-Arie van der Heijden	Midfielder	30 June 2011	(Netherlands) Willem II	-
	Transfer				
Substituted on	(South Africa) Thulani Serero	Midfielder	22 May 2011	(South Africa) Ajax Cape Town	€2,500,000
Substituted on	(Netherlands) Theo Janssen	Midfielder	23 May 2011	(Netherlands) Twente	€3,300,000
Substituted on	(Netherlands) Derk Boerrigter	Forward	20 June 2011	(Netherlands) RKC Waalwijk	€500,000
Substituted on	(Iceland) Kolbeinn Sigþórsson	Forward	4 July 2011	(Netherlands) AZ	€4,000,000
Substituted on	(Netherlands) Jasper Cillessen	Goalkeeper	27 August 2011	(Netherlands) NEC	€3,300,000
	Free Transfer				
Substituted on	(Belgium) Mats Rits	Midfielder	28 June 2011	(Belgium) Germinal Beerschot	-
Substituted on	(Russia) Dmitri Bulykin	Forward	31 August 2011	(Belgium) Anderlecht	-

==== Departures ====
- The following players moved from AFC Ajax.

	Name	Position	Transfer type	New club	Fee
	Out on loan				
Substituted off	(Netherlands) Roly Bonevacia	Midfielder	26 May 2011	(Netherlands) NAC Breda	-
Substituted off	(Netherlands) Marco Bizot	Goalkeeper	3 June 2011	(Netherlands) SC Cambuur	-
Substituted off	(Netherlands) Florian Jozefzoon	Forward	10 June 2011	(Netherlands) NAC Breda	-
Substituted off	(Argentina) Darío Cvitanich	Forward	6 July 2011	(Argentina) Boca Juniors	-
Substituted off	(Netherlands) Geoffrey Castillion	Forward	5 August 2011	(Netherlands) RKC Waalwijk	-
Substituted off	(Netherlands) Rodney Sneijder	Midfielder	20 August 2011	(Netherlands) FC Utrecht	-
	Transfer				
Substituted off	(Netherlands) Sergio Padt	Goalkeeper	2 July 2011	(Belgium) Gent	€300,000
Substituted off	(Netherlands) Demy de Zeeuw	Midfielder	6 July 2011	(Russia) Spartak Moscow	€6,000,000
Substituted off	(Netherlands) Maarten Stekelenburg	Goalkeeper	1 August 2011	(Italy) Roma	€6,300,000
	Free Transfer				
Substituted off	(Netherlands) Mitchell Donald	Midfielder	9 February 2011	(Netherlands) Roda JC	-
Substituted off	(Netherlands) Rob Wielaert	Defender	16 May 2011	(Netherlands) Roda JC	-
Substituted off	(Cameroon) Timothée Atouba	Defender	25 May 2011	(Spain) Las Palmas	-
Substituted off	(Netherlands) Marvin Zeegelaar	Forward	15 June 2011	(Spain) Espanyol	-
Substituted off	(Sweden) Rasmus Lindgren	Midfielder	20 June 2011	(Austria) Red Bull Salzburg	-
Substituted off	(Netherlands) Tom Overtoom	Midfielder	21 June 2011	(Netherlands) Sparta Rotterdam	-
Substituted off	(South Korea) Suk Hyun-jun	Forward	27 June 2011	(Netherlands) Groningen	-
Substituted off	(Spain) Oleguer	Defender	1 August 2011	—	-
Substituted off	(Netherlands) Evander Sno	Midfielder	17 August 2011	(Netherlands) RKC Waalwijk	-
Substituted off	(Netherlands) Jan-Arie van der Heijden	Midfielder	18 August 2011	(Netherlands) Vitesse	-
Substituted off	(Netherlands) Ronald Graafland	Goalkeeper	22 August 2011	(Netherlands) Feyenoord	-

=== Winter transfer window ===
For a list of all Dutch football transfers in the winter window (1 January 2012 to 1 February 2012) please see List of Dutch football transfers winter 2011–12.

==== Arrivals ====
- The following players moved to AFC Ajax.

	Name	Position	Transfer type	Previous club	Fee
	Free Transfer				
Substituted on	(Switzerland) Stefan Marinković	Defender	3 February 2011	(Switzerland) Luzern	-

==== Departures ====
- The following players moved from AFC Ajax.

	Name	Position	Transfer type	New club	Fee
	Transfer				
Substituted off	(Netherlands) Ouasim Bouy	Midfielder	31 January 2012	(Italy) Juventus	€200,000
	Free Transfer				
Substituted off	(Netherlands) Tom Boere	Forward	29 December 2011	(Belgium) Gent	-
