= Jonathan S. Lewin =

American neuroradiologist

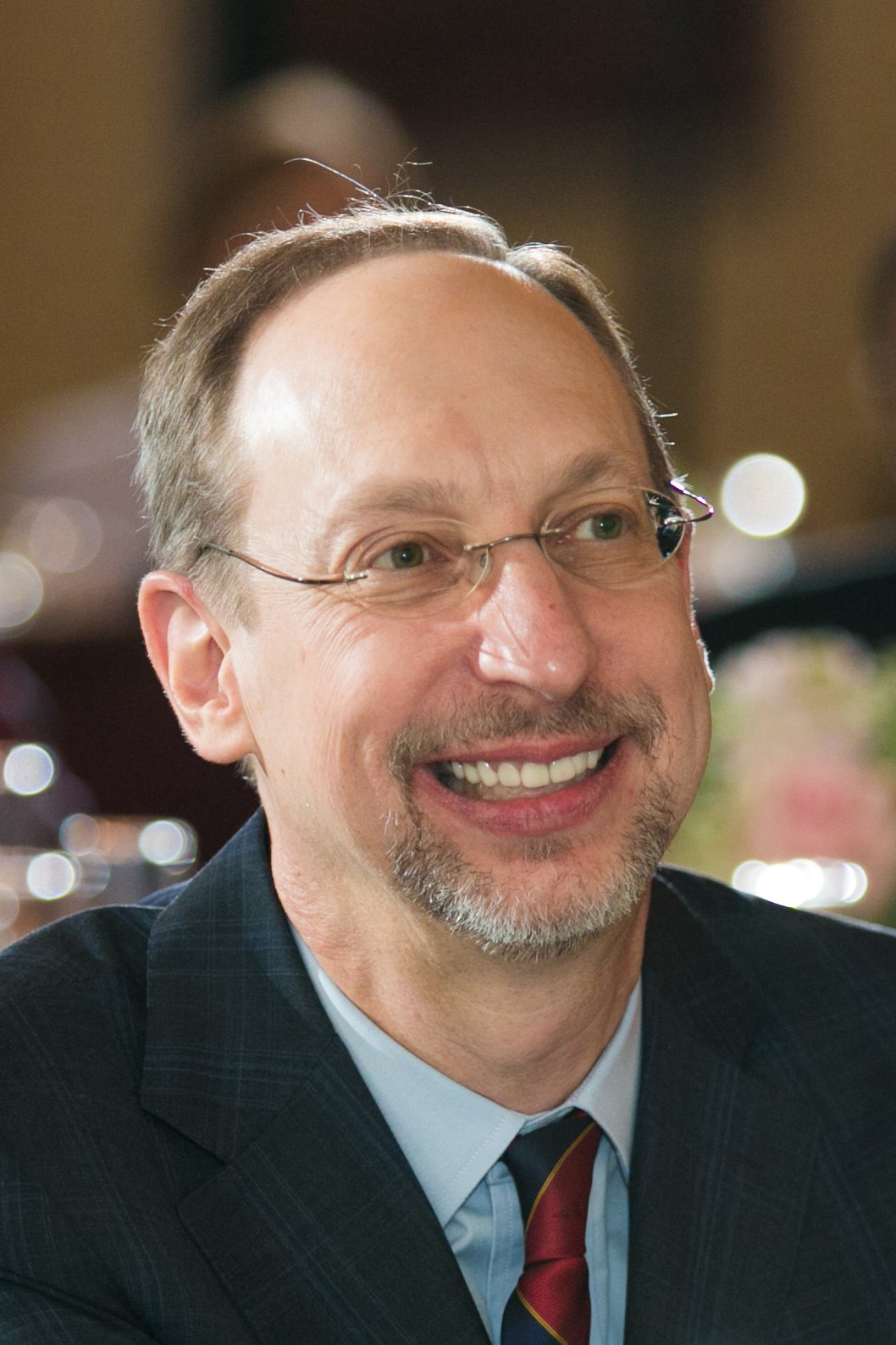
- Born: 1959 (age 66–67); Cleveland, Ohio
- Education: Brown University, Yale University
- Known for: Development of novel imaging and minimally invasive therapeutic techniques for cancer, vascular malformations, stroke, head and neck lesions, and other diseases
- Scientific career
- Fields: Neuroradiology, Magnetic resonance imaging, Health Policy, Biomedical Engineering
- Workplaces: Emory University

Jonathan S. Lewin (born 1959) is an American neuroradiologist specializing in medical imaging research with an emphasis on the investigation, development, and translation of new magnetic resonance imaging (MRI) techniques. He is the former executive vice president for health affairs (EVPHA) and executive director of the Woodruff Health Sciences Center for Emory University, and former President, CEO, and chairman of the board of Emory Healthcare. He currently serves as professor of radiology, biomedical engineering, and neurosurgery in the Emory School of Medicine and as professor of health policy and management in the Rollins School of Public Health.

Lewin currently serves as a director or trustee on a number of governing and advisory boards, including the Yale Corporation Committee on the School of Medicine, the Yale-New Haven Health System Board of Trustees, the Kaiser Health Plan and Hospitals Board of Directors, the VPMA/Dean’s External Advisory Board for the University of Iowa, the Networking Board for the Center for Women in Academic Medicine and Science, The Emory Empathetic AI Health Institute, and several other organizations.

== Education ==
Lewin was born in Cleveland and grew up in neighboring Beachwood, Ohio. He received his undergraduate A.B. degree in chemistry Magna Cum Laude from Brown University in 1981, where he was elected to the Phi Beta Kappa honor society. He received a Doctor of Medicine degree Cum Laude from Yale University School of Medicine in 1985, and was elected to the Alpha Omega Alpha honor society. He discovered his interest in imaging at Yale, and completed a thesis entitled "The Combined Use of Tc-99m-Phosphate and Ga-67-Citrate Imaging in the Diagnosis of Acute Osteomyelitis in Children" prior to graduation.

Following an internship at Yale-New Haven Hospital and residency in diagnostic radiology at University Hospitals of Cleveland, he completed a magnetic resonance research fellowship in Germany, a neuroradiology fellowship at the Cleveland Clinic, and additional training in head and neck radiology at the Pittsburgh Eye and Ear Hospital.

== Career ==
Lewin returned to Case Western Reserve and the University Hospitals of Cleveland as the Director of Magnetic Resonance Imaging and on the faculty of the department of radiology in 1993 and became vice chair for research and academic affairs in 1997. He held secondary appointments in the departments of oncology, neurological surgery, and biomedical engineering.

His research during that time focused on the development of novel MR imaging and interventional techniques, including MR-guided radiofrequency ablation of solid tumors, MR-guided sclerotherapy for vascular malformations, and intraoperative MR imaging technology and applications. His lab, run in partnership with Jeffrey Duerk, trained numerous biomedical engineering graduate students, post-doctoral fellows, radiology residents and fellows, and undergraduate medical students.

In 2004, Lewin was named the Martin W. Donner Professor and Chairman of the Russell H. Morgan department of radiology and radiological sciences and radiologist-in-chief at the Johns Hopkins University School of Medicine and The Johns Hopkins Hospital, respectively. Lewin also held appointments in the departments of oncology, neurosurgery and biomedical engineering. In 2012, Lewin was appointed co-chair of strategic planning and in 2013 as senior vice president for integrated health care delivery for Johns Hopkins Medicine. He held these positions until 2016 when he accepted the positions of executive vice president for health affairs (EVPHA) and executive director of the Woodruff Health Sciences Center for Emory University, and President, CEO, and chairman of the board of Emory Healthcare. In 2022 he stepped down from his executive roles, returning to his roots in innovation, technology development, research, and education through his academic appointments as professor of radiology, biomedical engineering, and neurosurgery in the Emory School of Medicine and as professor of health policy and management in the Rollins School of Public Health.

Lewin is an established leader in academic medicine strategy and integrated health care delivery. In these roles at Johns Hopkins, he spearheaded efforts to provide optimal quality and safety to patients while operating with top efficiency across the network of hospitals, physicians' offices, clinics, and outpatient care and surgery centers. He was also instrumental in the development of the five-year Johns Hopkins Medicine Strategic Plan.

He undertook similar leadership activities while at Emory, driving a comprehensive strategic planning process for the Woodruff Health Sciences Center (beginning implementation in 2018) and a Clinical Network Strategy which significantly increased convenience and accessibility for patients and providers throughout Georgia. During his tenure at Emory, employment in the Woodruff Health Sciences Center grew to 34,000, a 35% increase, and health sciences research saw 57% growth in funding to total $847 million in 2021.He also led unparalleled growth in Emory Healthcare, which saw its annual total operating revenue reach $5.5 billion—an increase of more than 80%.

Under his leadership, Emory also took a leading position in combating the COVID-19 pandemic by conducting clinical trials of the Moderna COVID-19 vaccine; working with Pfizer on developing the pediatric vaccine; holding trials of the Johnson & Johnson COVID-19 vaccine and Remdesivir, a medication used to treat hospitalized COVID patients; and creating molnupiravir, the first antiviral pill approved for use against SARS-CoV-2. Lewin also helped coordinate communication among major hospital systems in dealing with the unprecedented challenges associated with the pandemic.

== Notable achievements ==
Lewin is an internationally recognized pioneer in interventional and intraoperative MRI. His research interests include the science and clinical aspects of interventional MR imaging, functional MR imaging, head and neck imaging, MR angiography, small animal imaging, and the imaging of acute stroke. More recent presentations focus on leadership in academic medicine.

Lewin has published more than 270 articles, commentaries, and chapters and has served on editorial boards or as an editor for the Journal of Magnetic Resonance Imaging, the American Journal of Neuroradiology, the Journal of the American College of Radiology, Magnetic Resonance Imaging Clinics of North America, Topics in Magnetic Resonance Imaging, and Current Protocols in Magnetic Resonance Imaging. In addition, he holds twenty-eight U.S. and seven international patents for inventions related to MRI technology and has been principal or co-principal investigator on more than $54 million in grants from the National Institutes of Health and other federal and state funding agencies. He is a Fellow of the National Academy of Inventors.

Lewin has been heavily involved in radiology professional societies and served as president of the Society of Chairs of Academic Radiology Departments, the American Roentgen Ray Society, the Association of University Radiologists, the Academy for Radiology Research, and the International Society for Strategic Studies in Radiology. In addition, he served on the executive boards of the American College of Radiology and the American Society of Neuroradiology. He has been honored as a Fellow of the International Society of Magnetic Resonance in Medicine and Fellow of the American College of Radiology, and has been included in Modern Healthcare's 50 most influential physicians, Georgia Trend's most influential Georgians, the Atlanta Business Chronicle's 100 most influential Atlantans, and Atlanta Magazine's Atlanta 500. He was named a Most Admired CEO (Healthcare) by the Atlanta Business Chronicle and was awarded the Radiology Research Alliance Innovation and Leadership Award as well as the Leadership Luminary Award from the Radiology Leadership Institute of the American College of Radiology, the American Roentgen Ray Society's Gold Medal, the National Medical Fellowships Pioneer Award, the Association of University Radiologists Gold Medal Award, and the Radiological Society of North America Gold Medal, among other honors.
