= Derks =

Derks is a surname. Notable people with the surname include:

- Frans Derks (1930–2020), Dutch football referee and sports executive
- Mike Derks (Canadian football) (born 1962), Canadian football player

== See also ==
- Derk (given name)
- DIRKS
- Perks (surname)
