= Jan Vertonghen =

Belgian footballer (born 1987)

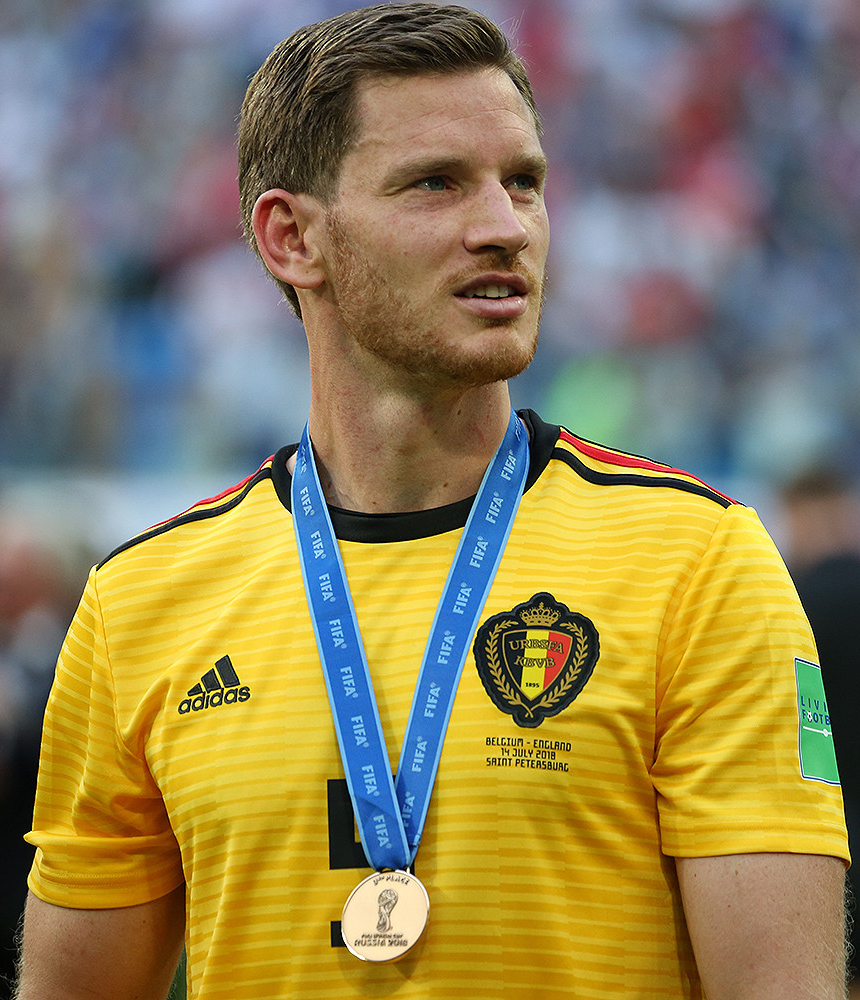
- Vertonghen with Belgium at the 2018 FIFA World Cup

Personal information
- Full name: Jan Bert Lieve Vertonghen
- Date of birth: 24 April 1987 (age 39)
- Place of birth: Sint-Niklaas, Belgium
- Height: 1.89 m (6 ft 2 in)
- Positions: Centre-back; left-back

Youth career
- 1997–2000: VK Tielrode
- 2000–2003: Germinal Beerschot
- 2003–2006: Ajax

Senior career*
Years	Team	Apps	(Gls)
2006–2012	Ajax	155	(23)
2006–2007	→ RKC Waalwijk (loan)	12	(3)
2012–2020	Tottenham Hotspur	232	(6)
2020–2022	Benfica	57	(0)
2022–2025	Anderlecht	64	(4)
Total		520	(36)

International career
2002	Belgium U16	6	(1)
2007	Belgium U21	3	(0)
2007–2024	Belgium	157	(10)
Medal record
Men's football
Representing Belgium
FIFA World Cup
Third place	2018 Russia
- * Club domestic league appearances and goals

Jan Bert Lieve Vertonghen (Dutch pronunciation: [jɑm ˈbɛrt ˈlivə vərˈtɔŋə(n)]; born 24 April 1987) is a Belgian former professional footballer who played as a defender. Mainly a centre-back, he also played as a left-back.

Vertonghen began his senior career at Dutch club Ajax in 2006, and totalled 220 games and 28 goals for them across all competitions, serving as their captain from 2011 to 2012. He won two Eredivisie and two KNVB Cup titles during his time at the club, and in 2012 was named Dutch Footballer of the Year. Vertonghen transferred to Tottenham Hotspur in July 2012, and made the PFA Team of the Year in his first Premier League season. He made 315 appearances for Spurs over eight years, as well as reaching the 2019 UEFA Champions League final, and was named the club's Player of the Year in 2018. After spending two seasons with Portuguese club Benfica, he returned to Belgium with Anderlecht in 2022. At 37, he became the club's oldest player, surpassing club icon Olivier Deschacht, before retiring from the sport in 2025.

Vertonghen made his international debut for Belgium in 2007 and his 157 caps (including three unofficial games, according to FIFA rules) are the most in the history of the national team. He was part of Belgian squads that came fourth at the 2008 Olympics, third at the 2018 FIFA World Cup, and reached the quarter-finals at two UEFA European Championships (2016 and 2024). In July 2024, following that year's Euro edition, Vertonghen announced his retirement from international football.

== Early life ==
Vertonghen was born in Sint-Niklaas, East Flanders, Belgium, to Ria Mattheeuws and Paul Vertonghen. He has two brothers, Ward and Lode; both have played football.

== Club career ==
=== Ajax ===
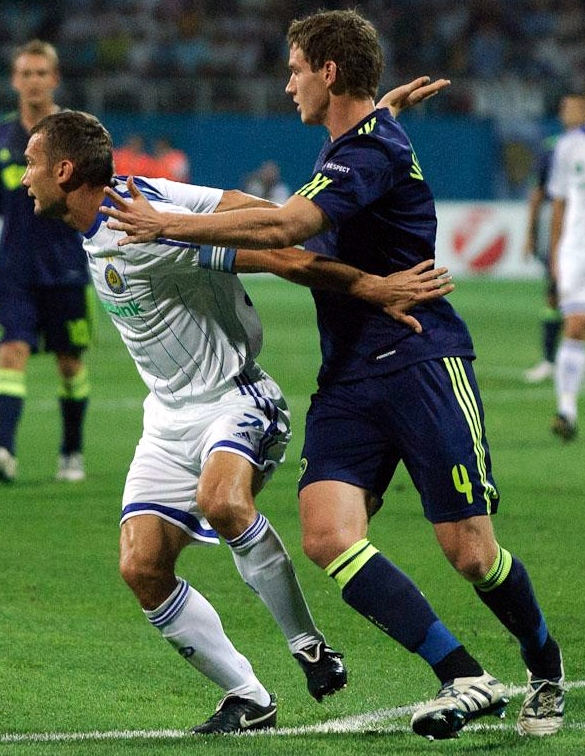
Vertonghen (right) playing for Ajax in 2010

After spending time at VK Tielrode and Germinal Beerschot, Vertonghen moved to the Netherlands and signed a contract with the youth academy of Eredivisie side AFC Ajax. He began as a midfielder but then became a regular at centre-back for Ajax. During his time in the reserves, he became known for an incident in a 2006 KNVB Cup game against Cambuur Leeuwarden, his first home game at the Amsterdam Arena, where he scored a goal to put Ajax 3–0 up. He had attempted a back pass to the Cambuur goalkeeper while a teammate was receiving treatment but instead the ball went into the goal. Since it was unintentional, Ajax allowed Cambuur to score a goal in return. On 23 August 2006, Vertonghen made his first team debut in the Champions League third qualifying round against Copenhagen. He made his first start and Eredivisie debut in a 6–0 win over Willem II at the Amsterdam Arena and would play another two matches for the first half of the season.

==== Loan to RKC ====
After the winter break of the 2006–07 season, he was sent on loan to struggling RKC Waalwijk for the remainder of the season. At RKC, he would play 12 matches in which he scored three times, but he was unable to help the team avoid relegation to the Eerste Divisie. One of his goals with RKC Waalwijk was against his parent club, Ajax, in a 2–2 draw, which eventually let Ajax finish second in the league on goal difference with PSV.

==== Breakthrough at Ajax ====
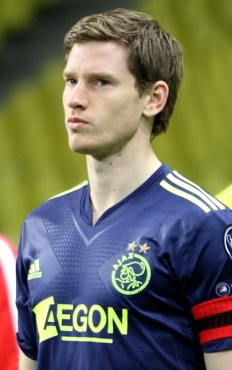
Vertonghen with Ajax in 2011

Vertonghen returned to Ajax for the 2007–08 season, where he was tipped for stardom, but was unable to break through due to a severe injury and the presence of central defenders John Heitinga and Thomas Vermaelen. Johan Cruyff had made no secret of his admiration for the left-footed youngster who can handle any left-sided position in defence and midfield, opting, on 26 September 2008, to extend his contract to 30 June 2013.

The 2008–09 season was a breakthrough season for the young defender. After John Heitinga left for Atlético Madrid, Vertonghen became Thomas Vermaelen's first-choice partner in central defence; the former started 23 of the 26 games he played in and scored four goals. On 28 September, he scored a rare double against Vitesse in a 3–0 win. Although sustaining an injury from training during the week, he played in the match against Groningen on 24 January, billed as a "must-win" match by coach Marco van Basten; Vertonghen was unfortunate enough to be sent off for two yellow cards as Ajax lost 1–0. He was out for a month after sustaining a hamstring injury in an away win on 1 March against Utrecht, but his return lasted only several games after his season was prematurely ended after aggravating another injury.

==== Rising importance under Jol ====
Under new coach Martin Jol, Vertonghen retained his place in the starting line-up for the 2009–10 season. Despite injuring his toe while on international duty against Spain the previous week, he scored his first goal of the season, a free kick, in a 6–0 thrashing of NAC Breda on 13 September. With the departure of Thomas Vermaelen to Arsenal, he and fellow Belgian Toby Alderweireld become the first choice centre-back pairing and soon became a firm fans' favourite. Despite Ajax's erratic form in the latter weeks leading up to the winter break, he turned in some strong performances and attracted the interest of a number of clubs, including Barcelona, but he played down the rumours, stating his intent to at least see out his contract with Ajax.

After the winter break, Ajax went on a nine-game unbeaten streak in the league, with Vertonghen playing a key role. Their run of six consecutive clean sheets was ended in a 4–1 home win over PSV when the visiting side were awarded a penalty. Vertonghen was linked with a move to Newcastle United, and later he was also linked with Milan, stating, "I've heard Milan Director Adriano Galliani talk about me after the Champions League match in San Siro and his words were very flattering."

Vertonghen stated on numerous occasions late in the 2010–11 season that he was considering leaving Ajax at the end of that season. In May 2011, Frank de Boer confirmed Manchester City boss Roberto Mancini was present at the 2011 KNVB Cup Final held on 7 May 2011, where Vertonghen's side lost 3–2 to Twente. Mancini was reportedly scouting Vertonghen to strengthen his side after they had qualified for the UEFA Champions League 2011–12 campaign.

==== Breakthrough under De Boer ====
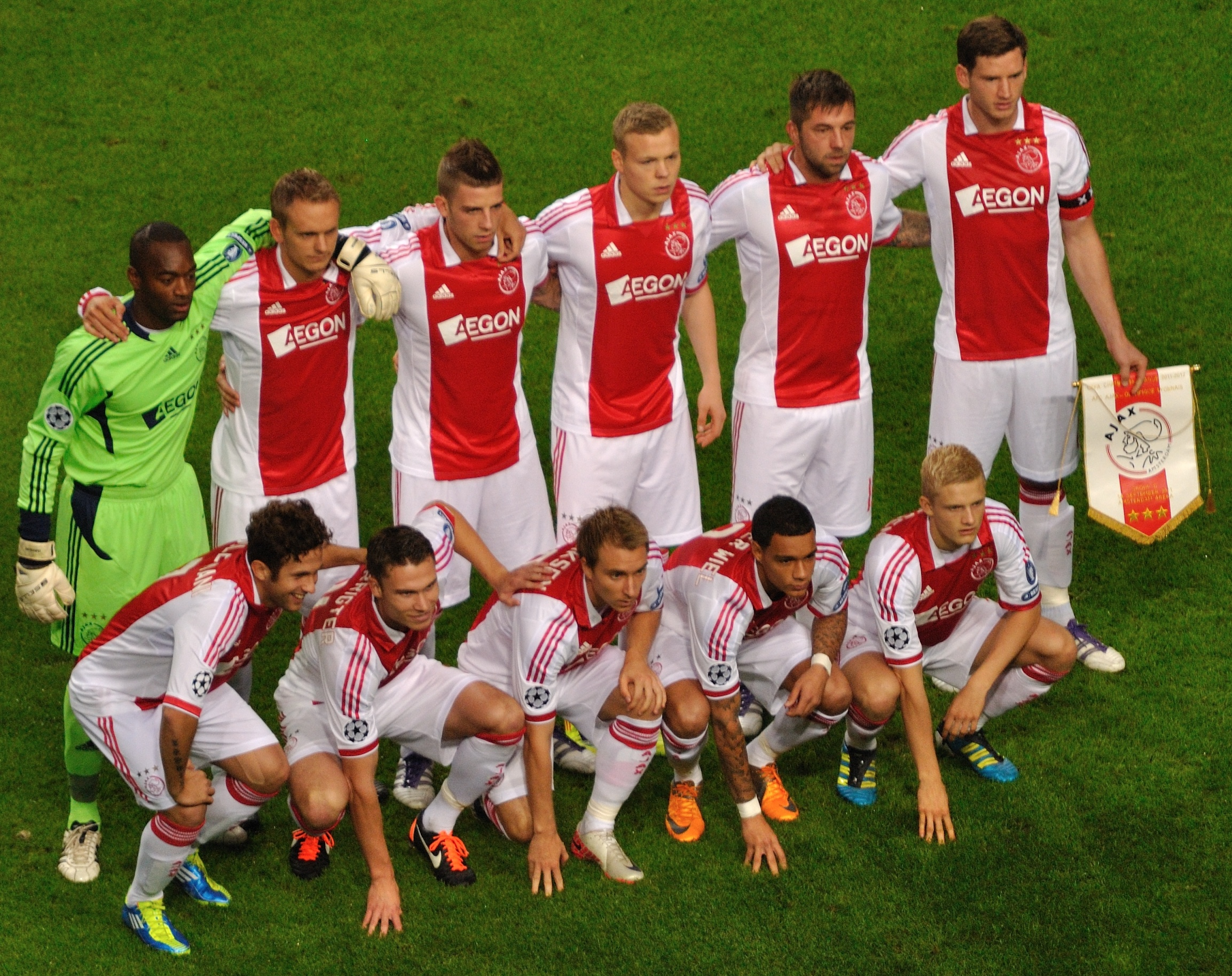
Vertonghen (top right) lining up for Ajax as captain in 2011

During the 2011–12 Eredivisie season, Vertonghen emerged as one of Ajax's best players, demonstrating his versatility to cover multiple positions after Ajax had let several regular players out on long-term loans. After an impressive season, including a performance for which he was singled out for praise against Manchester United in the UEFA Europa League Round of 16, he was named the 2011–12 Eredivisie Player of the Year. Named team captain by Frank de Boer, he led his Ajax to their second title in a row, scoring eight goals in 31 league games, highlighting his attacking strengths. Also, for the second time, he dropped the Championship plate. "Now it falls on my toe – this plate just does not like me," Vertonghen said.

=== Tottenham Hotspur ===
==== 2012–13 season ====
Throughout the 2011–12 season, Vertonghen was linked with English club Tottenham Hotspur and publicly expressed his desire to make the move to White Hart Lane ahead of numerous other teams. A key factor in this was his desire to play as a centre-back, with Arsenal wanting to use him as a defensive midfielder. On 8 July 2012, Tottenham agreed a fee and terms for Vertonghen subject to a medical. On 12 July, Tottenham announced that they had officially completed the signing of Vertonghen, for an amount around 12 million Euros, after he successfully completed his medical. Vertonghen took part in his first game as a Tottenham player in a 3–2 friendly win against Brentford on 14 July, then later scored his first goal for the club on 26 September in a 3–0 win against Carlisle United in the third round of the Football League Cup.

Vertonghen scored his first Premier League goal against Manchester United in a historic 2–3 win at Old Trafford, although this was later ruled to be an own goal by Jonny Evans. He scored in the league for Tottenham on 16 December, the only goal of the game, in a win at White Hart Lane against Swansea City. Vertonghen then scored a brace in a losing effort against Liverpool on 10 March. He was named Premier League Player of the Month for March 2013, making himself the second Belgian and the 12th Spurs player to win the award. On 11 April 2013, Vertonghen was sent-off against Basel during Tottenham's Europa League quarter-final second leg. Tottenham went on to lose the tie 4–1 on penalties after a 4–4 draw on aggregate. Vertonghen was named in the 2012–13 PFA Team of the Year, alongside Rio Ferdinand, Leighton Baines and Pablo Zabaleta in defence.

==== 2013–14 season ====
During a League Cup match with Aston Villa in September, Villa striker Nicklas Helenius gained notoriety when Vertonghen pulled down his shorts while he shot on goal, which revealed his briefs. After an incident the following game with Chelsea which got Fernando Torres sent off, Chelsea coach José Mourinho thought that Vertonghen should not have been playing because of the Helenius incident which he said that Vertonghen left the striker "naked".

==== 2014–15 season ====
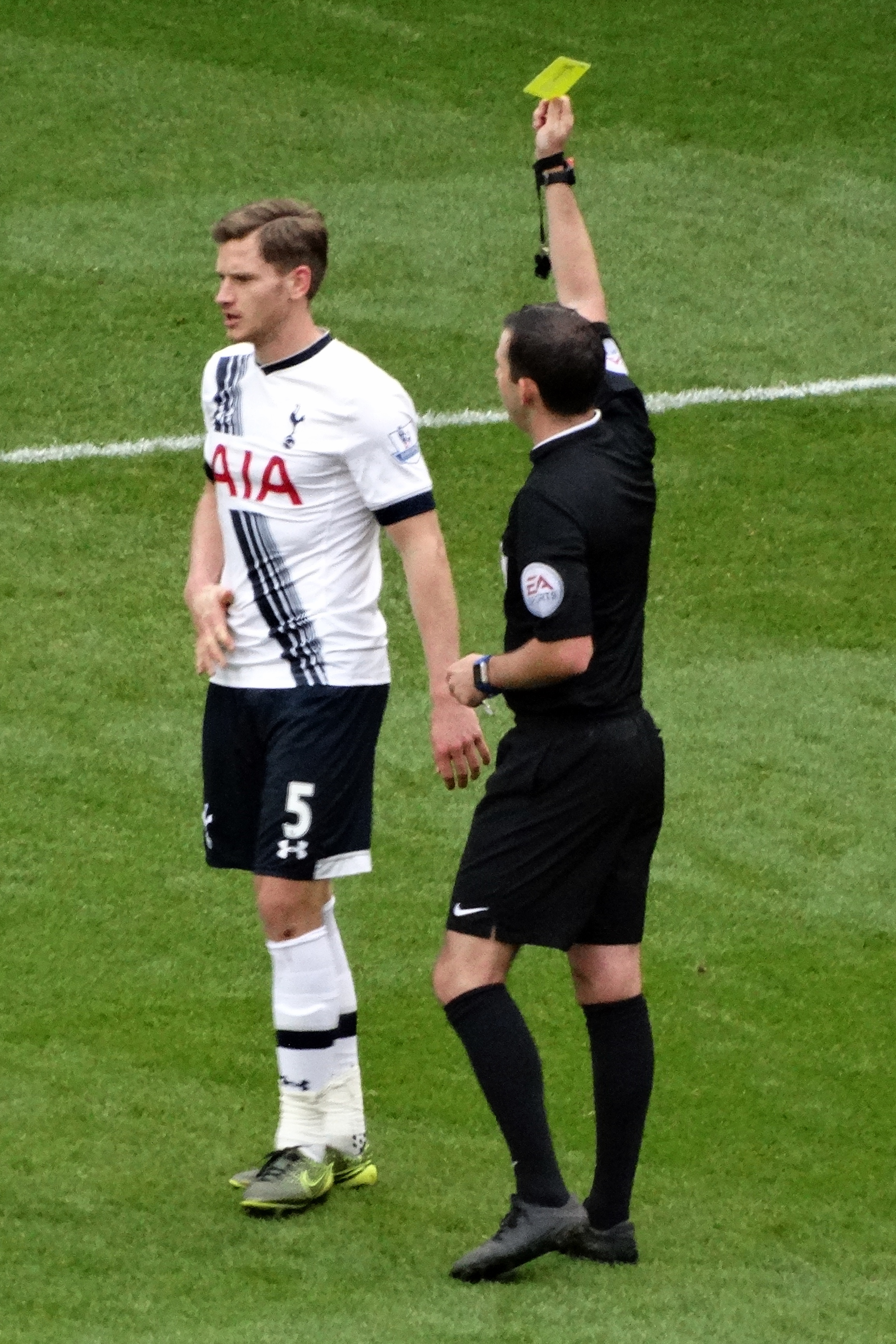
Vertonghen playing for Tottenham Hotspur in 2015

At the start of the 2014–15 season, Vertonghen appeared to be out of favour with new manager Mauricio Pochettino. The Argentine gave Vertonghen limited games, preferring Younès Kaboul and Federico Fazio. However, Kaboul lost his place to Vertonghen, who formed an effective partnership with Fazio. Together, the pair, over the span of 15 games, celebrated 11 wins and only suffered one loss. Vertonghen helped Spurs to reach the 2015 League Cup Final and started the game on 1 March 2015, but Tottenham lost to rival club Chelsea at Wembley Stadium 2–0.

==== 2015–16 season ====
Vertonghen was joined in defence by former Ajax teammate and compatriot Alderweireld at the start of the 2015–16 season. Over the first ten games of the season, Vertonghen and Alderweireld played ten out of the opening ten games together, with Spurs suffering only one loss during the span. In late January 2016, he damaged his medial knee-ligament and did not play for 11 weeks. He returned in the home match against Manchester United on 10 April 2016, which finished in a 3–0 win, the first home league win for Tottenham against Manchester United since 2001. His partnership with Alderweireld in the defence was recognised as being crucial for the club which had the joint-lowest number of goals conceded in the Premier League that season.

==== 2016–17 season ====
On 2 December 2016, Vertonghen signed a new contract with Tottenham until 2019. However, in mid January 2017, Vertonghen suffered an ankle ligament injury that would see him out of action for five weeks. He returned to the team on 19 February in the fifth round FA Cup match against Fulham at Craven Cottage. This season, Vertonghen was part of the Tottenham defence that achieved the best defensive record for the club, with only 26 goals conceded in the Premier League (and only 9 conceded in home league games), 6 better than the previous record of 32 conceded that was set in the 1908–09 season in the Second Division. He was considered then one of the best defenders in the Premier League.

==== 2017–18 season ====
On 7 January 2018, Vertonghen scored his first goal for the club since October 2013, a 30-yard strike in the 3–0 win over Wimbledon in the third round of the 2017–18 FA Cup. This season, he made 36 appearances out of the 38 Premier League games, as well six in the UEFA Champions League, and five in the cups.

==== 2018–19 season ====
In the opening game of the 2018–19 season against Newcastle United, Vertonghen scored Tottenham's first goal of the season 8 minutes into the game, helping the team to a 2–1 win. However, he suffered a hamstring injury in the game against Huddersfield on 29 September, and was out for two months, returning to the starting lineup in the Champions League game against Inter Milan in late November. His contract with Tottenham was extended to 2020 in December 2018. In the last 16 round home game against Borussia Dortmund in the Champions League, Vertonghen played in the less familiar position of left wing back, scoring one goal and providing one assist in a game that finished 3–0. He received wide praise for his performance in this game, and he was named the Champions League Player of the Week by UEFA.

In the match against Ajax in the semifinal of the Champions League, he suffered a head injury after clashing his head with Toby Alderweireld. He returned to play in the leg in Amsterdam wearing a protective mask, and helped the team to a dramatic win against Ajax that sent Tottenham to their first Champions League final. Vertonghen later revealed that the collision left him with symptoms of concussion such as dizziness and headaches for nine months afterwards, which affected his performance in the following and final season with Tottenham.

==== 2019–20 season ====
In the 2019–20 season, Vertonghen scored a late goal also as the winning goal, his first of the season, in the away game against Wolverhampton Wanderers to snatch a 2–1 win. On 26 December 2019, he made his 300th Tottenham appearance in a 2–1 home comeback win over Brighton & Hove Albion. Vertonghen's contract was originally set to expire on 30 June 2020, but was extended to the end of the 2019–20 campaign due to the stoppage related to COVID-19. He became a free agent after the club's last game of the season against Crystal Palace. Vertonghen did not appear in the match.

=== Benfica ===
On 14 August 2020, Benfica announced the signing of the 33-year old on a three-year deal. He made his debut on 15 September away to Greece's PAOK in the third qualifying round of the Champions League, a 2–1 loss in a one-leg match where he scored an own goal. Three days later he played for the first time in the Primeira Liga, a 5–1 win at Famalicão in the season opener. On 3 December 2020, Vertonghen scored his first goal for Benfica in a home match against Lech Poznan in the group stage of the Europa League.

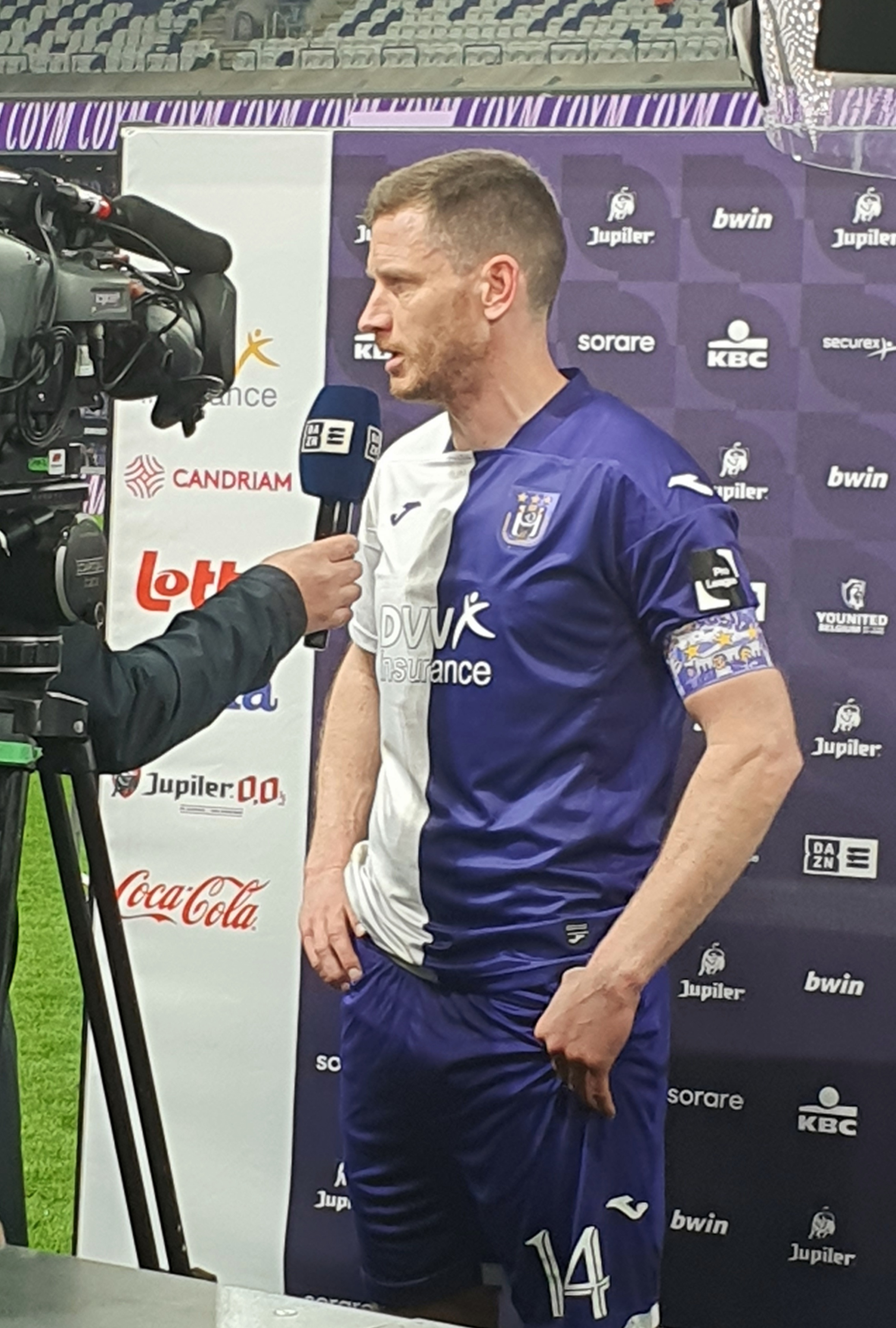
Vertonghen with Anderlecht in 2024

=== Anderlecht ===
On 2 September 2022, Vertonghen signed with Belgian club Anderlecht on a free transfer, after he and Benfica agreed to the termination of his contract.

Vertonghen made his debut for Anderlecht on 7 August 2022, in a 2–2 home draw against Leuven in the Belgian Pro League. He scored his first goal for Anderlecht on 18 September 2022, in a Belgian Pro League match against Kortrijk He scored with a powerful header, contributing to a 4–1 home win. Vertonghen first wore the captain's armband for Anderlecht on 23 October 2022, during a Belgian Pro League match against fierce rivals Standard de Liège in the Belgian Clasico, at the Stade Maurice Dufrasne. The match was abandoned due to flares being thrown by the away supporters after the hosts went 3–1 up. Vertonghen stepped in as captain due to the absence of the regular captain, Hendrik Van Crombrugge. Vertonghen was named captain ahead of the 2023–24 season, his second with the club.

On 11 December 2023, Vertonghen made his 50th appearance for Anderlecht in a 1–1 away draw against Gent, at the Planet Group Arena.

On 5 May 2024, in a 0–0 Belgian Pro League Champions’ Playoffs match in the Brussels Derby against Union Saint-Gilloise, Vertonghen picked up a groin injury, sidelining him for the rest of the season. His absence was an integral part of Anderlecht losing the title to rivals Club Brugge. On 18 July 2024, Vertonghen signed a one-year extension with Anderlecht. In March 2025, he announced his retirement from professional football by the end of the 2024–25 season. On 18 May 2025, Vertonghen played his last professional match against Brugge.

== International career ==
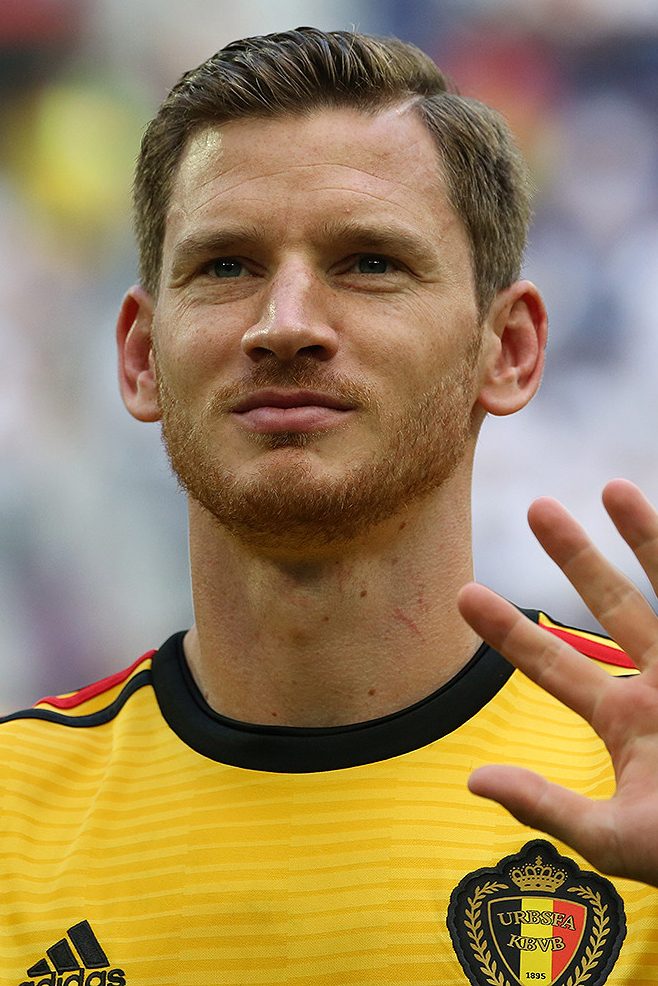
Vertonghen with Belgium at the 2018 FIFA World Cup

Vertonghen represented Belgium at under-21 level in beginning in 2006 and played in the 2007 UEFA Under-21 Championship.

On 2 June 2007, he made his senior debut for the national team in a 2–1 home loss against Portugal in UEFA Euro 2008 qualification. At the end of the game he was fouled by substitute striker Hugo Almeida, who was sent off. Vertonghen was also selected for the 2008 Olympics and played in every match as the Belgians unexpectedly took fourth place.

In the 2010 FIFA World Cup qualifying, he began to establish himself as a regular for Belgium, initially at centre-back as former Ajax teammate Thomas Vermaelen's partner. He scored the opening goal, also his first ever international goal, in an August 2009 friendly against the Czech Republic that ended in a 3–1 loss. On 7 September 2009, in a World Cup qualifying away match against Spain, he injured his toe and had to be stretchered off and substituted in the 29th minute of a 5–0 loss. He often played at left-back as Vermaelen and Vincent Kompany were the preferred pairing in central defence. He was back in the starting eleven for the friendly against Hungary, a 3–0 win, and the 1–0 loss to Croatia the following March.

On 13 May 2014, Vertonghen was named in Belgium's squad for the 2014 FIFA World Cup. In the team's opening match against Algeria, the African side was awarded a penalty after Vertonghen pulled down Sofiane Feghouli and received a yellow card. Feghouli scored for Algeria from the penalty spot, but Belgium came back to win 2–1. He was then replaced by Thomas Vermaelen in the starting line-up for the second match against Russia on 22 June. After 31 minutes, however, Vermaelen was taken off with an injury and replaced by Vertonghen. In the final group match, Vertonghen captained the team and scored the winning goal as Belgium beat South Korea 1–0.

Early in the 2014–15 season, Vertonghen knocked a child unconscious with a misplaced shot during a training session with the Belgian squad. In 2016, he injured two ligaments in his ankle in an accident while training before the quarter-final against Wales during UEFA Euro 2016, and as a result missed the match that Belgium lost.

Eleven years to the day on from his international debut, against the same opposition (Portugal), Vertonghen won his 100th cap (the first in Belgian history), which was presented to him by his mother.

At the 2018 FIFA World Cup in Russia, Vertonghen initiated the scoring in Belgium's second-half comeback from a 2–0 deficit against Japan, heading into the far post from 20 yards out as his side went on to win 3–2.

Vertonghen was called up to Belgium's squads for UEFA Euro 2020 in May 2021, in which they reached the quarter-finals, as well as the 2022 FIFA World Cup in November 2022, in which they were eliminated in the group stage.

On 28 May 2024, Vertonghen was called up to Belgium's squad for UEFA Euro 2024. He scored an own goal in their 1–0 defeat to France in the round of 16.

Vertonghen announced his retirement from international football on 5 July 2024, ending his Belgium career with a record 157 appearances across seventeen years.

== Career statistics ==
=== Club ===
Appearances and goals by club, season and competition
Club	Season	League			National cup (Note: Includes KNVB Cup, FA Cup, Taça de Portugal, Belgian Cup)		League cup (Note: Includes Football League/EFL Cup, Taça da Liga)		Europe		Other		Total	
Club	Season	Division	Apps	Goals	Apps	Goals	Apps	Goals	Apps	Goals	Apps	Goals	Apps	Goals
Ajax	2006–07	Eredivisie	3	0	0	0	—		3 (Note: One appearance in UEFA Champions League, two appearances in UEFA Cup)	0	0	0	6	0
Ajax	2007–08	Eredivisie	31	2	3	0	—		1 (Note: Appearance(s) in UEFA Champions League)	0	2 (Note: Appearances in Eredivisie European play-offs)	0	37	2
Ajax	2008–09	Eredivisie	26	4	2	0	—		7 (Note: Appearances in UEFA Cup)	1	—		35	5
Ajax	2009–10	Eredivisie	32	3	7	0	—		10 (Note: Appearance(s) in UEFA Europa League)	0	—		49	3
Ajax	2010–11	Eredivisie	32	6	6	1	—		13 (Note: Four appearances and one goal in UEFA Champions League, nine appearances in UEFA Europa League)	1	0	0	51	8
Ajax	2011–12	Eredivisie	31	8	3	2	—		8 (Note: Six appearances in UEFA Champions League, two appearances in UEFA Europa League)	0	0	0	42	10
Ajax	Total		155	23	21	3	—		42	2	2	0	220	28
RKC Waalwijk (loan)	2006–07	Eredivisie	12	3	1	0	—		—		—		13	3
Tottenham Hotspur	2012–13	Premier League	34	4	1	0	2	1	12	1	—		49	6
Tottenham Hotspur	2013–14	Premier League	23	0	0	0	2	0	8	1	—		33	1
Tottenham Hotspur	2014–15	Premier League	32	0	2	0	6	0	7	0	—		47	0
Tottenham Hotspur	2015–16	Premier League	29	0	0	0	0	0	4	0	—		33	0
Tottenham Hotspur	2016–17	Premier League	33	0	3	0	0	0	6 (Note: Five appearances in UEFA Champions League, one appearance in UEFA Europa League)	0	—		42	0
Tottenham Hotspur	2017–18	Premier League	36	0	4	1	1	0	6	0	—		47	1
Tottenham Hotspur	2018–19	Premier League	22	1	1	0	1	0	10	1	—		34	2
Tottenham Hotspur	2019–20	Premier League	23	1	4	1	0	0	3	0	—		30	2
Tottenham Hotspur	Total		232	6	15	2	12	1	56	3	—		315	12
Benfica	2020–21	Primeira Liga	28	0	3	0	1	0	9 (Note: One appearance in UEFA Champions League, eight appearances and one goal in UEFA Europa League)	1	1 (Note: Appearance in Supertaça Cândido de Oliveira)	0	42	1
Benfica	2021–22	Primeira Liga	28	0	3	0	2	0	13	0	—		46	0
Benfica	2022–23	Primeira Liga	1	0	—		—		0	0	—		1	0
Benfica	Total		57	0	6	0	3	0	22	1	1	0	89	1
Anderlecht	2022–23	Belgian Pro League	24	1	1	0	—		11 (Note: Appearances in UEFA Europa Conference League)	1	—		36	2
Anderlecht	2023–24	Belgian Pro League	34	3	2	0	—		—		—		36	3
Anderlecht	2024–25	Belgian Pro League	6	0	1	0	—		1	0	—		8	0
Anderlecht	Total		64	4	4	0	—		12	1	—		80	5
Career total			520	36	47	5	15	1	132	7	3	0	717	49

=== International ===
Appearances and goals by national team and year
National team	Year	Apps	Goals
Belgium	2007	6	0
Belgium	2008	7	0
Belgium	2009	7	1
Belgium	2010	7	0
Belgium	2011	8	1
Belgium	2012	9	2
Belgium	2013	10	0
Belgium	2014	13	1
Belgium	2015	9	1
Belgium	2016	13	0
Belgium	2017	9	2
Belgium	2018	12	1
Belgium	2019	8	0
Belgium	2020	5	0
Belgium	2021	13	0
Belgium	2022	9	0
Belgium	2023	8	1
Belgium	2024	4	0
Total		157	10

The friendlies against Romania on 14 November 2012 and Luxembourg on 26 May 2014 are not officially recognised FIFA matches due to an excessive number of substitutions when only six were allowed.
Belgium score listed first, score column indicates score after each Vertonghen goal.

List of international goals scored by Jan Vertonghen
No.	Date	Venue	Cap	Opponent	Score	Result	Competition
1	12 August 2009	Na Stínadlech, Teplice, Czech Republic	15	Czech Republic	1–3	1–3	Friendly
2	29 March 2011	King Baudouin Stadium, Brussels, Belgium	30	Azerbaijan	4–1	4–1	UEFA Euro 2012 qualification
3	15 August 2012	King Baudouin Stadium, Brussels, Belgium	39	Netherlands	4–2	4–2	Friendly
4	7 September 2012	Millennium Stadium, Cardiff, Wales	40	Wales	2–0	2–0	2014 FIFA World Cup qualification
5	26 June 2014	Arena Corinthians, Paulo, Brazil	58	South Korea	1–0	1–0	2014 FIFA World Cup
6	13 November 2015	King Baudouin Stadium, Brussels, Belgium	74	Italy	1–1	3–1	Friendly
7	3 September 2017	Karaiskakis Stadium, Athens, Greece	92	Greece	1–0	2–1	2018 FIFA World Cup qualification
8	7 October 2017	Stadion Grbavica, Sarajevo, Bosnia and Herzegovina	93	Bosnia and Herzegovina	3–2	4–3	2018 FIFA World Cup qualification
9	2 July 2018	Rostov Arena, Rostov-on-Don, Russia	105	Japan	1–2	3–2	2018 FIFA World Cup
10	12 September 2023	Koning Boudewijnstadion, Brussels, Belgium	150	Estonia	1–0	5–0	UEFA Euro 2024 qualification

== Honours ==
Ajax

- Eredivisie: 2010–11, 2011–12
- KNVB Cup: 2006–07, 2009–10

Tottenham Hotspur

- Football League Cup runner-up: 2014–15
- UEFA Champions League runner-up: 2018–19

Benfica

- Primeira Liga: 2022–23
- Taça de Portugal runner-up: 2020–21
- Taça da Liga runner-up: 2021–22

Anderlecht

- Belgian Cup runner-up: 2024–25

Belgium

- FIFA World Cup third place: 2018

Individual

- Ajax Talent of the Year (Marco van Basten Award): 2007–08
- Ajax Player of the Year (Rinus Michels Award): 2011–12
- Dutch Footballer of the Year: 2012
- AFC Ajax Club of 100: 2012
- PFA Team of the Year: 2012–13 Premier League, 2017–18 Premier League
- Premier League Player of the Month: March 2013
- Honorary Citizen of Temse, Belgium: 2018
- UEFA Champions League Squad of the Season: 2018–19
- RBFA 125 Years All Star Team: 2020
- IFFHS All Time Belgium Dream Team: 2021
- Vlaamse Reus: 2024
- Golden Cap: 2024

== See also ==
- List of men's footballers with 100 or more international caps
