= Derk (given name) =

Derk is a Dutch masculine given name. Notable people with the name include:

- Derk Bodde (1909–2003), American sinologist
- Derk Boerrigter (born 1986), Dutch footballer
- Derk Cheetwood (born 1973), American actor
- Derk Droze (born 1972), American soccer player
- Derk Jan Eppink (born 1958), Dutch journalist and politician
- Derk Rijkens (born 1975), Dutch cricketer
- Derk Sauer (1952–2025), Dutch journalist and media proprietor
- Derk Gerard Willem Spitzen (1896–1957), Dutch politician
- Jacob Derk Carel van Heeckeren (1730–1795), Baron of Ruurlo
