= Guy Ramos =

Footballer (born 1985)

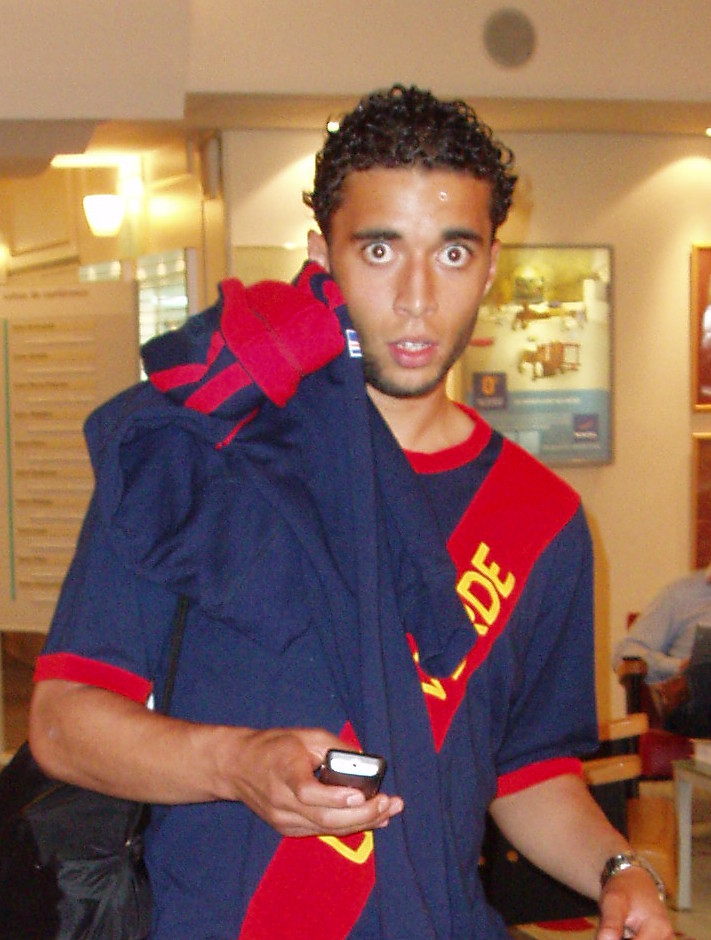
- Ramos in 2010

Personal information
- Full name: Odysseu Guy Ramos
- Date of birth: 16 August 1985 (age 41)
- Place of birth: Rotterdam, Netherlands
- Height: 1.84 m (6 ft 0 in)
- Position: Centre-back

Senior career*
Years	Team	Apps	(Gls)
2005–2011	FC Dordrecht	137	(8)
2011–2013	RKC Waalwijk	57	(2)
2013–2015	Roda JC Kerkrade	34	(2)
2015–2016	FC Wil	32	(1)
2018	Chabab Rif Al Hoceima	0	(0)
2018–2019	Almere City	3	(0)
2019–2020	FC Maense		

International career
2008–2013	Cape Verde	11	(0)
- * Club domestic league appearances and goals

Odysseu Guy Ramos (born 16 August 1985) is a former professional footballer who played as a centre-back. Born in the Netherlands, he represented the Cape Verde national team at international level.

== Career ==
Born in Rotterdam, Ramos has played club football for FC Dordrecht and RKC Waalwijk, before he signed with Roda JC Kerkrade from July 2013.

Despite being born in the Netherlands, Ramos qualifies for Cape Verde through parentage and received his first national team call-up in May 2008. He made his international debut in a friendly match against Luxembourg on 27 May 2008. He was named in the Cape Verde squad for the 2013 Africa Cup of Nations, and spoke about his confidence in the team before the tournament began. In 2014 Ramos sexually assaulted Aron Jóhannsson of AZ Alkmaar during a game.

After a knee injury curtailed his career, Ramos spent two years as a free agent and spent time at the Team VVCS training camp. He signed for Chabab Rif Al Hoceima of the Botola in Morocco in July 2018.

== Honours ==
RKC Waalwijk:

- Eerste Divisie: 2010–11
