= Derk, Kohgiluyeh and Boyer-Ahmad =

Derk درك
- Village
- Location within Iran
- Coordinates: 30°33′53″N 50°57′27″E
- Country: Iran
- Province: Kohgiluyeh and Boyer-Ahmad
- County: Basht
- Bakhsh: Central
- Rural District: Kuh Mareh Khami

Population (2006)
  - Total: 74
- Time zone: UTC+3:30 (IRST)
  - Summer (DST): UTC+4:30 (IRDT)

Derk (Persian: درك) is a village in Kuh Mareh Khami Rural District, in the Central District of Basht County, Kohgiluyeh and Boyer-Ahmad Province, Iran. At the 2006 census its population was 74, in 15 families.
