= Derk Boerrigter =

Dutch footballer (born 1986)

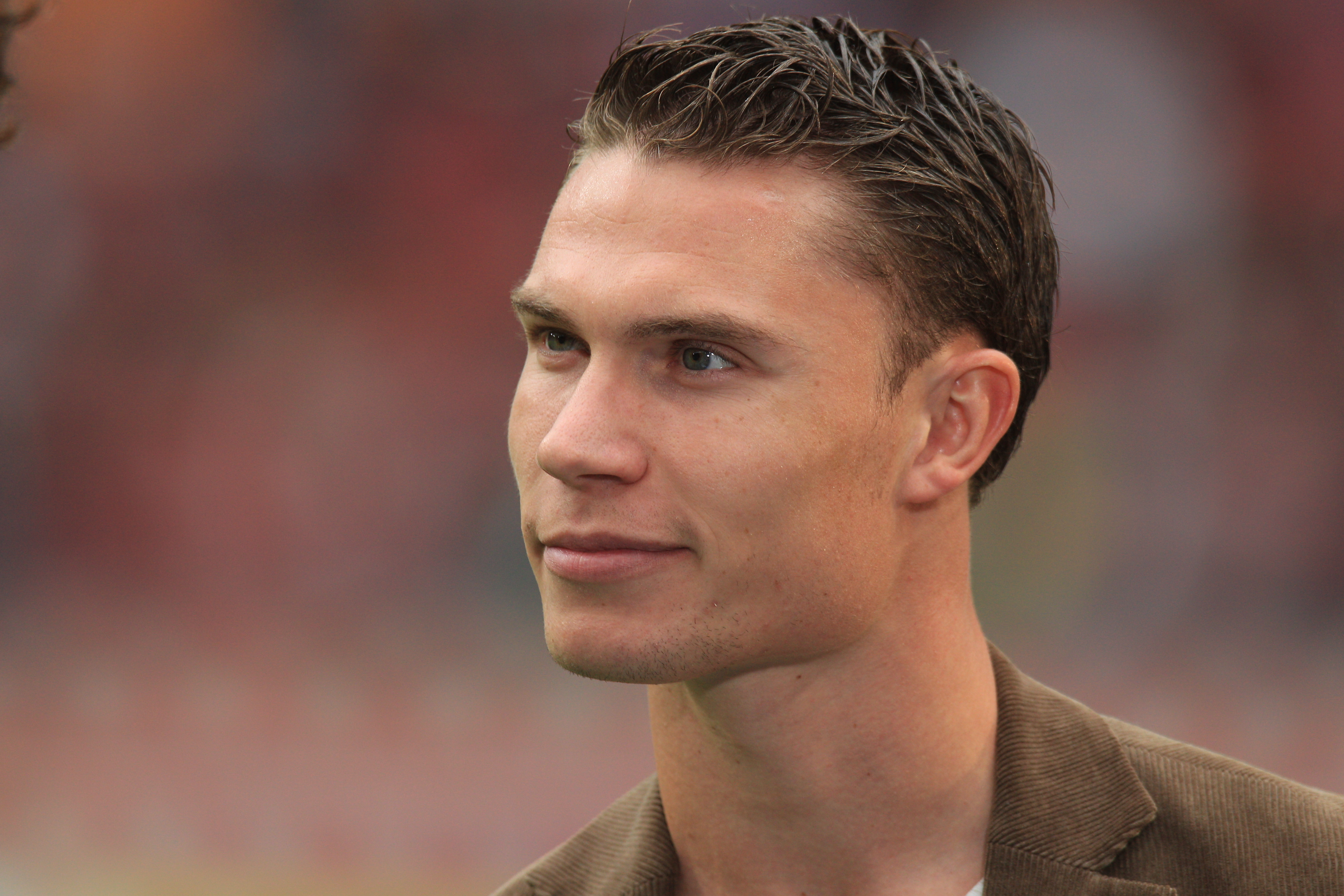
- Boerrigter in 2011

Personal information
- Full name: Derk Boerrigter
- Date of birth: 16 October 1986 (age 40)
- Place of birth: Oldenzaal, Netherlands
- Height: 1.88 m (6 ft 2 in)
- Position: Winger

Youth career
- Quick '20
- 2003–2005: Twente
- 2005–2006: Ajax

Senior career*
Years	Team	Apps	(Gls)
2006–2007	Ajax	0	(0)
2007	→ Haarlem (loan)	8	(1)
2007–2009	FC Zwolle	63	(11)
2009–2011	RKC Waalwijk	64	(25)
2011–2013	Ajax	47	(12)
2013–2016	Celtic	16	(1)
Total		198	(48)
- * Club domestic league appearances and goals

Derk Boerrigter (born 16 October 1986) is a Dutch former footballer who played as a winger. He began his professional career with Ajax, but did not make any first team appearances and was eventually loaned to Haarlem. He then played for FC Zwolle and RKC Waalwijk before rejoining Ajax. In 2013, he moved abroad to sign for Celtic, playing there until retiring following the 2015–16 season.

== Club career ==
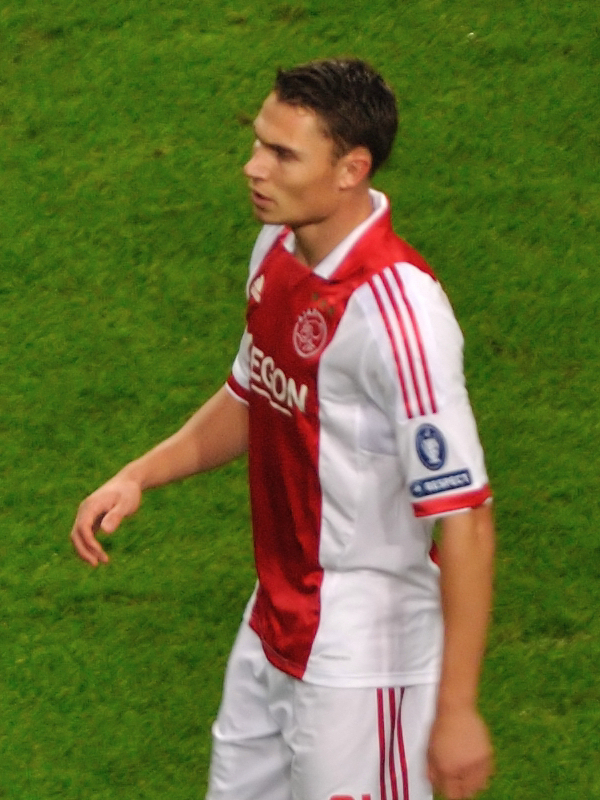
Boerrigter with Ajax

=== Ajax (first period) ===
Born in Oldenzaal, Boerrigter started his career in the youth department of Quick '20. At age twelve he was scouted and recruited by FC Twente, where he played in various youth squads before joining the Academy. While playing for Twente's A1 squad, he impressed scouts from AFC Ajax and in the summer of 2005 he signed a two-year contract with the Amsterdam-based club and joined the selection of Jong Ajax. Although he was on the substitutes bench for several games, he was never able to make his full first team debut.

==== Loan to Haarlem ====
He was loaned to HFC Haarlem in 2007. He made his professional debut on 2 February 2007, in the home-match against AGOVV Apeldoorn which ended in a 1–1 draw. In this match, he was used as a 70th-minute substitute. He played eight competitive matches during his period in Haarlem, scoring one goal.

=== FC Zwolle ===
After his contract with Ajax expired in 2007, Boerrigter signed a one-year contract with FC Zwolle, with the option for another year. He was a regular starter in Zwolle, and scored 11 goals in 63 league matches.

=== RKC Waalwijk ===
He attracted attention from several big clubs in his home country, but he chose to sign with RKC Waalwijk, who had just won promotion to the Eredivisie. On 1 August 2009, Boerrigter made his Eredivisie debut in a match against FC Utrecht. Boerrigter soon developed into an important player at RKC, being an integral part of the team that won the 2010–11 Eerste Divisie.

=== Ajax (second period) ===
In the January transfer window of 2011 Ajax renewed their interest in Boerrigter, making an unsuccessful attempt to purchase him. However, in the summer of 2011 he finally returned to Ajax, signing a three-year contract. He received squad number 21 for the 2011–12 season. He made his debut on 30 July 2011 in the 2–1 loss against Twente for the Johan Cruijff Shield, replacing Kolbeinn Sigþórsson in the 66th minute. In his first Eredivisie match for Ajax he scored his first goal for the club, in a 4–1 victory over De Graafschap. He continued his good start for the club with goals against Heerenveen, Vitesse, Dinamo Zagreb & Roda JC. After being out a few months with a back injury, Boerrigter made an impact in his second game as he scored two in a 3–1 victory over De Graafschap. Having made 17 appearances for Ajax in the 2011–12 season, Boerrigter scored seven league goals to help his side secure their 31st Eredivisie title.

On 14 April 2013, coming on as a substitute for Christian Poulsen in the 75th minute, Boerrigter scored the match winning goal against rivals PSV Eindhoven in the 77th minute off a long assist from his teammate Christian Eriksen, in which he challenged PSV's defender Erik Pieters and then shot the ball past goalkeeper Boy Waterman, only two minutes after having been brought on. The match ended in a 3–2 victory for Ajax, and proved to be a crucial win for the Amsterdammers, with only four matches left to play in the season. Ajax topped the table at that stage with 66 points, leaving PSV in third-place position with only 60 points in the title pursuit. On 13 July 2013, Boerrigter scored a hat-trick in the first half of a 5–1 away win over his former club RKC Waalwijk, in a pre-season friendly encounter scoring in the 17th, 21st and 28th minutes, helping his side to a 3–1 lead.

=== Celtic ===
On 30 July 2013, Boerrigter signed a four-year deal with Celtic. A transfer fee between the two parties of Ajax and Celtic was agreed upon, since Boerrigter still had two more seasons left on his contract with Ajax. The fee was reported to be around €3.5 million (roughly £3 million) by his agent Søren Lerby. Upon his arrival in Glasgow he was given the number 11 shirt. Boerrigter made his Celtic debut against Ross County on 3 August 2013, but was taken off injured. Celtic went on to win the match 2–1. He scored his first goal for Celtic on 23 November 2013, netting Celtic's second goal in injury time in a 3–1 win over Aberdeen. However, injuries curtailed Boerrigter's first team involvement during his first few months at Celtic.

On 15 August 2014, he was cited by the SFA for diving to unlawfully gain a penalty kick during a match against St. Johnstone. He subsequently accepted a two-match ban for "simulation" in the incident which had also resulted in a red card been issued to St Johnstone defender Dave MacKay. Having made no further first team appearances since, Boerrigter was released from his Celtic contract in April 2016.

== International career ==
Boerrigter received his first international call up when he was named in the 23-man squad for the friendlies against Switzerland and Germany in November 2011 but did not play due to a back injury.

== Career statistics ==
As of 27 December 2015

Club performance			League		Cup		Continental		Other		Total	
Season	Club	League	Apps	Goals	Apps	Goals	Apps	Goals	Apps	Goals	Apps	Goals
Netherlands			League		KNVB Cup		Europe^{1}		Other^{2}		Total	
2006–07	Ajax	Eredivisie	0	0	0	0	0	0	0	0	0	0
2006–07	Haarlem	Eerste Divisie	8	1	0	0	-		-		8	1
2007–08	FC Zwolle	Eerste Divisie	32	3	4	2	-		0	0	36	5
2008–09	FC Zwolle	Eerste Divisie	31	8	1	0	-		0	0	32	8
2009–10	RKC Waalwijk	Eredivisie	31	7	1	0	-		-		32	7
2010–11	RKC Waalwijk	Eerste Divisie	33	18	5	4	-		-		38	22
2011–12	Ajax	Eredivisie	17	7	1	2	4	1	1	0	23	10
2012–13	Ajax	Eredivisie	30	5	5	0	8	1	0	0	43	6
2013–14	Celtic	Scottish Premiership	15	1	3	0	5	0	0	0	23	1
2014–15	Celtic	Scottish Premiership	1	0	0	0	2	0	0	0	3	0
2015–16	Celtic	Scottish Premiership	0	0	0	0	0	0	0	0	0	0
Total	Netherlands		182	49	17	8	13	2	1	0	213	59
Total	Scotland		16	1	3	0	7	0	0	0	26	1
Total	Career total		198	50	20	8	20	2	1	0	239	60

^{1} Includes UEFA Champions League and UEFA Europa League matches.

^{2} Includes Johan Cruijff Shield matches.

== Honours ==
=== Club ===
RKC Waalwijk

- Eerste Divisie: 2010–11

Ajax

- Eredivisie: 2011–12, 2012–13
- Johan Cruijff Shield: 2013

Celtic

- Scottish Premiership: 2013–14
