= Derk Rijkens =

Dutch cricketer

Personal information
- Full name: Derk Adriaan Rijkens
- Born: 16 December 1975 (age 50); The Hague, Netherlands
- Batting: Right-handed
- Bowling: Right-arm leg-spin

International information
- National side: Netherlands (1998)
- Source: CricketArchive, 21 February 2016

Derk Adriaan Rijkens (born 16 December 1975) is a former Dutch international cricketer who represented the Dutch national side in several matches in 1998. He played as a right-handed middle-order batsman.

Rijkens was born in The Hague, and played his club cricket for HCC. He made his senior debut for the Netherlands on a tour of England in June 1998, which included a friendly against Devon (a minor county) and a NatWest Trophy match against Somerset. In the game against Somerset, which held List A status, he came in seventh in the batting order, scoring 12 runs before being dismissed by Graham Rose. Later in the year, Rijkens also represented the Netherlands in a one-day match against South Africa (on its way to a tour of England), as well in a single match at the European Championship.
