= Durk =

Durk is a masculine given name. Notable people with the name include:

- Durk Jager (born 1943), American businessman
- Durk Pearson (born 1943), American writer
- Durk Willems (died 1569), Dutch Anabaptist martyr
- Lil Durk (real name Durk Banks; born 1992), American rapper
