= Jeffrey Duerk =

Former provost of the University of Miami, Florida

Jeffrey Duerk was the provost of the University of Miami in Coral Gables, Florida from 2017-2023.

== Education ==
Duerk received his BS degree in electrical engineering from Purdue University, his MS degree in electrical engineering from Ohio State University, and his PhD in biomedical engineering from Case Western Reserve University in 1987.

== Career ==
Duerk has served on the faculty of Case Western Reserve University, where he was dean of the Case School of Engineering, and was named an IEEE fellow in 2015 for contributions to rapid magnetic resonance imaging technologies.

=== University of Miami ===
In 2017, Duerk was named provost and executive vice president for academic affairs at the University of Miami. Duerk stepped down in July 2023.
